= Carl Grosse =

German writer and philosopher (1768–1847)

Carl Friedrich August Grosse (5 June 1768 – 15 March 1847) also known as Edouard Romeo Vargas-Bedemar was a German author, translator, aesthetic philosopher, and mineralogist. He is best known for his gothic novel Der Genius, which was translated into English by Peter Will as Horrid Mysteries, subtitled "A Story From the German Of The Marquis Of Grosse" and subsequently referenced by Jane Austen as one of the seven 'horrid novels' in Northanger Abbey. His philosophy focused on the aesthetics of sublimity, following the work of Friedrich Schiller, and provided one of the first philosophical treatments of imagination.

== Biography ==
Grosse was born in Magdeburg, Germany on 5 June 1768, the son of Erenst Grosse, a successful doctor, and Dorothea Elizabeth Amalia Schröder. In 1786, he enrolled at the University of Göttingen to study medicine, and began his literary career there with essays on the sublime and transmigration of the soul, as well as engaging in translation of works by Scottish moral philosopher and poet James Beattie. He transferred to the University of Halle in late 1788, where he joined secret societies. Afterwards, he travelled to Italy and Switzerland, and returned to Göttingen sporting the cross of the Knights of Malta, claiming to have inherited a title "Marquis Grosse of Vargas" from a deceased Italian aristocratic wife, a claim quickly exposed as a fraud which forced him to leave Göttingen for Spain in 1791.

Grosse spent two years in Spain, attacking in writing Göttingen's academic society for rejecting him. In 1793 he moved to Italy, claiming to be Edouard Romeo, count of Vargas, a falsified title to which he added Baron Bedemar in 1795. He lived in Italy until 1808, when he was accused of political conspiracy. He was again forced to move, and settled in Denmark, where he became friends with the future King of Denmark Christian VIII and was entrusted by the Danish government with several high offices. Grosse also served some time in the Austrian military as an officer. While in Denmark, he made a reputation as a mineralogist and mining expert. Respected as a geologist, he joined several Danish scientific societies and went on study trips to the Faroe Islands, Scotland, Scandinavia, Russia, the Azores, and the Canary Islands.

For most of his life, Grosse lived using the name Edouard Romeo Vargas, and published the majority of his works using it. He invented a fake family for himself: father Carl Emmanuel von Vargas, mother Elizabeth Murray (who he claimed was of old Scottish ancestry), and sister Rosalia von Spreti. Grosse's fiancée Luise Michaelis (daughter of scholar Johann David Michaelis) described him as "mysterious, impressive, and frightening" and ultimately did not end up marrying him. Grosse mocked Luise Michaelis's sister Caroline Schegel, saying she "was not attractive [...] she possessed neither intelligence nor common-sense[...] and as to character, she had none," while Schegel called Grosse "[...] an obtuse windbag, a shameless, unfeeling poltroon."

Grosse died on 15 March 1847 in Copenhagen.

== Philosophy ==
Grosse was a philosopher of sublimity, contemporaneous with and strongly influenced by Friedrich Schiller. Grosse was a proponent of hearing as the sense best suited to the sublime, rather than the typically privileged sight. He wrote that the ear is "most suited to an indefinite Schwärmerei of imagination." He also theorized that distance of sound (which he called "entfernung" had a key role in producing sublime experiences, writing "A soft music heard from afar is far more stirring than if heard in the concert hall; and the wavering tones of the distant [entfernung] set off the power of imagination into the realm of scattered images." Grosse applied gothic landscape traditions to the mind, where psychological responses are framed in terms of physical spaces of light and dark. According to Grosse, the imagination turns passive emotional sublimity into an active emotional without any moral evaluation, a philosophical stance that anticipated amoralism and was one of the earliest attempts at a theory of imagination.

== Influence ==
Grosse's literature was an influence on German romantic writers, including Ludwig Tieck and E. T. A. Hoffmann. Though Tieck was strongly influenced by Grosse and incorporated his themes and ideas in his work, he also criticized Grosse, calling him "a gracious, imaginative, and sensitive sort of person, only he lacks and will always lack power and depth." In entitling a philosophical treatise, Grosse took Schiller's title Über das Erhabene, which was subsequently reused by Tieck in 1792 and again by Grosse and Schiller in 1801.

Through Über das Erhabene, Grosse took ideas of Edmund Burke, James Beattie, and Johann Georg Schlosser, and was alongside Schiller's Von Erhabenen, introduced a British aesthetic sublimity to the German philosophical scene, which to that moment had been dominated by French-originated moral sublimity.

Der Genius was loosely translated into English by Peter Will and entitled Horrid Mysteries. Printed by Minerva Press, the book became well known to an English audience and was included by Jane Austen among seven 'horrid' novels in Northanger Abbey, alongside The Necromancer by Karl Friedrich Kahlert, The Castle of Wolfenbach by Eliza Parsons, Clermont by Regina Maria Roche, The Mysterious Warning, a German Tale, by Eliza Parsons, The Midnight Bell by Francis Lathom, and The Orphan of the Rhine by Eleanor Sleath. The book was favoured by early English romantics. However, it was forgotten in the ensuing decades and all seven books were assumed to be fictitious inventions of Austen. Horrid Mysteries was the first to be re-found, by English author and collector Michael Sadleir, who encountered it alongside Roche's Children of the Abbey in 1922 at a bookstore on Oxford Street, London.

== Works ==
- Über das Erhabene (Göttingen and Leipzig, 1788)
- Helim, oder Über die Seelenwanderung (Zittau and Leipzig, 1789)
- Der Genius. Aus den Papieren des Marquis C. von G. (Halle, 1791–1795)
- Memoiren des Marquis von G. (Berlin, 1792–1795)
- Der Dolch (Berlin, 1794–1795)
- Chlorinde. Aus den Papieren des Don Juans von B. (Berlin 1796)
- Horrid Mysteries (London, 1796)
- Über des grieschische Epigramm (Berlin and Stettin, 1798)
- Reise nach dem Hohen Norden durch Schweden, Norwegen, und Lappland. In den Jahren 1810, 1811, 1812, und 1814 (Frankfurt, 1819)

== See also ==
- Cajetan Tschink, contemporary Gothic novelist and Schiller imitator translated by Peter Will
