= Valancourt Books =

American publishing house

- Founded: 2005; 21 years ago
- Founder: James Jenkins; Ryan Cagle
- Country of origin: United States
- Headquarters location: Richmond, Virginia
- Publication types: Novels
- Fiction genres: Gothic fiction Horror fiction Gay literature
- Official website: valancourtbooks.com

Valancourt Books is an independent American publishing house founded by James Jenkins and Ryan Cagle in 2005. The company specializes in "the rediscovery of rare, neglected, and out-of-print fiction", in particular gay titles, Gothic novels and horror novels from the 18th century to the 1980s.

== Overview ==
Discovering that many works of Gothic fiction from the late 18th and early 19th centuries were unavailable in print, James Jenkins and Ryan Cagle founded independent American publishing house Valancourt Books in 2005, and began reprinting some of them. Specializing in "the rediscovery of rare, neglected, and out-of-print fiction", their list includes the "Northanger 'horrid' novels", seven gothic novels lampooned by Jane Austen in Northanger Abbey (1818) and once thought to be fictional titles of Austen's creation. Eventually the company "expanded into neglected Victorian-era popular fiction, including old penny dreadfuls and sensation novels, as well as a lot of the decadent and fin de siècle literature of the 1890s."

In 2012, Jenkins and Cagle realized that there was 20th century literature as recent as the 1970s or 1980s that was equally difficult to find, and began republishing such modern works, in particular those of gay interest or in the horror/supernatural genre. Valancourt has reprinted many works last published in the 1980s by the now-defunct Gay Men's Press in their Gay Modern Classics series.

Valancourt's reprint editions all have new introductions either by the original authors or by "leading writers or critics."

== Legal deposit ==
Valancourt refused to deposit its books with the Library of Congress as required by legal deposit rules and sued the Copyright Office. It lost in first instance, but won on appeal in August 2023.

== Notable titles ==
Author	Work(s)	Genre	Description
Eliza Parsons	Castle of Wolfenbach (1793); The Mysterious Warning, a German Tale (1796)	Gothic	Wolfenbach and Mysterious Warning are two of the "Northanger 'horrid' novels", seven Gothic novels lampooned by Jane Austen in Northanger Abbey and once thought to be fictional titles of Austen's creation.
Lawrence Flammenberg	The Necromancer; or, The Tale of the Black Forest (1794)	Gothic	Another of Austen's Northanger 'horrid' novels.
Francis Lathom	The Castle of Ollada (1795); The Midnight Bell (1798)	Gothic	Latham's first novel, The Castle of Ollada, is the story of a young man trying to solve the mystery of the ancient castle. Midnight Bell is another of Austen's Northanger 'horrid' novels.
Matthew Lewis	The Monk (1796)	Gothic; Horror	The Monk, the sinister and violent tale of an increasingly destructive Spanish monk, was praised for its genius and simultaneously condemned for its lewdness, vulgarity and blasphemy by the most important critics of its day. The novel was widely popular because the reading public had been told that the book was horrible, blasphemous, and lewd, and they rushed to put their morality to the test.
Regina Maria Roche	Clermont (1798)	Gothic	Another of Austen's Northanger 'horrid' novels.
Eleanor Sleath	The Orphan of the Rhine (1798)	Gothic	Another of Austen's Northanger 'horrid' novels.
Joseph Sheridan Le Fanu	Carmilla (1871)	Horror; LGBTQ	A lesbian vampire tale that influenced Bram Stoker's Dracula (1897).
Anonymous	The Sins of the Cities of the Plain (1881); Letters from Laura and Eveline (1883)	LGBTQ	A Victorian erotic novel about a male prostitute, set in London around the time of the Cleveland Street Scandal and the Oscar Wilde trials. Letters from Laura and Eveline is its "appendix" or sequel.
Anonymous	Teleny, or The Reverse of the Medal (1893)	LGBTQ	One of the earliest pieces of English-language pornography to explicitly and near-exclusively concern homosexuality, of unknown authorship but often attributed to a collaborative effort by Oscar Wilde and some of his contemporaries.
Charles R. Jackson	The Fall of Valor (1946)	LGBTQ	A man vacationing with his wife in Nantucket finds himself falling in love with a Marine. The novel is "arguably the first major American novel to deal openly with the theme of homosexuality."
Francis King	Never Again (1947); An Air That Kills (1948); The Dividing Stream (1951); The Dark Glasses (1954)		Never Again is a "heartbreaking" novel based on the author's childhood; An Air That Kills is the story of a malaria-stricken writer who returns from a stint as a colonial administrator in India and forges a relationship with his orphaned nephew. The Dividing Stream won the 1952 Somerset Maugham Award, and in The Dark Glasses a married couple who have lost the spark in their marriage move to Corfu.
Walter Baxter	Look Down in Mercy (1951)	LGBTQ	Celebrated novel about the World War II romance between an officer and an enlisted man.
Rodney Garland	The Heart in Exile (1953)	LGBTQ	The first gay detective novel, about a psychiatrist investigating his former lover's suicide.
Kenneth Martin	Aubade (1957)		The story of a teenager's first love, written when the author was 16.
Gerald Kersh	Fowler's End (1958); Nightshade and Damnations (1968)		Fowler's End is a Depression-era Dickensian comedy. Nightshade and Damnations is a collection of Kersh's short stories edited by Harlan Ellison.
Michael Nelson	A Room in Chelsea Square (1958)	LGBTQ	A "camp" novel about a wealthy gentleman who lures an attractive younger man to London with the promise of an upper crust lifestyle.
Gillian Freeman	The Leather Boys (1961)	LGBTQ	The first novel to focus on love between young working-class men rather than aristocrats. It was adapted into the 1964 film The Leather Boys.
Robin Maugham	The Wrong People (1967)	LGBTQ	Arnold Turner, a repressed English schoolmaster on holiday in Tangier, gives in to his long-suppressed homosexual desires and subsequently becomes embroiled in a dangerous sex trafficking scheme devised by a wealthy and manipulative American expatriate, Ewing Baird.
Michael Campbell	Lord Dismiss Us (1967)	LGBTQ	Story of two gay people at a boarding school: "a teenager unashamedly coming to terms with his identity and a tortured teacher who is unable to accept his own," published in the same year that homosexuality between consenting adults was legalized in the United Kingdom.
Michael McDowell	The Amulet (1979); Cold Moon Over Babylon (1980); Gilded Needles (1980); The Elementals (1981); Katie (1982); Blood Rubies (1982) as Axel Young; Wicked Stepmother (1983) as Axel Young; Toplin (1985)	Horror	The Elementals is a horror novel that Poppy Z. Brite has called "surely one of the most terrifying novels ever written," and which led Stephen King to proclaim McDowell "the finest writer of paperback originals in America today."
Michael Talbot	The Delicate Dependency (1982)	Horror	A celebrated vampire novel.
Tim Lucas	Throat Sprockets (1994)	Horror	Featured in Stephen Jones and Kim Newman's Horror: 100 Best Books series and chosen by Rue Morgue as one of the Best Alt Horror Novels. Published by Valancourt in a 30th anniversary edition featuring an additional chapter not included in previous editions.
