= The Mysterious Warning: A German Tale =

1796 novel by Eliza Parsons

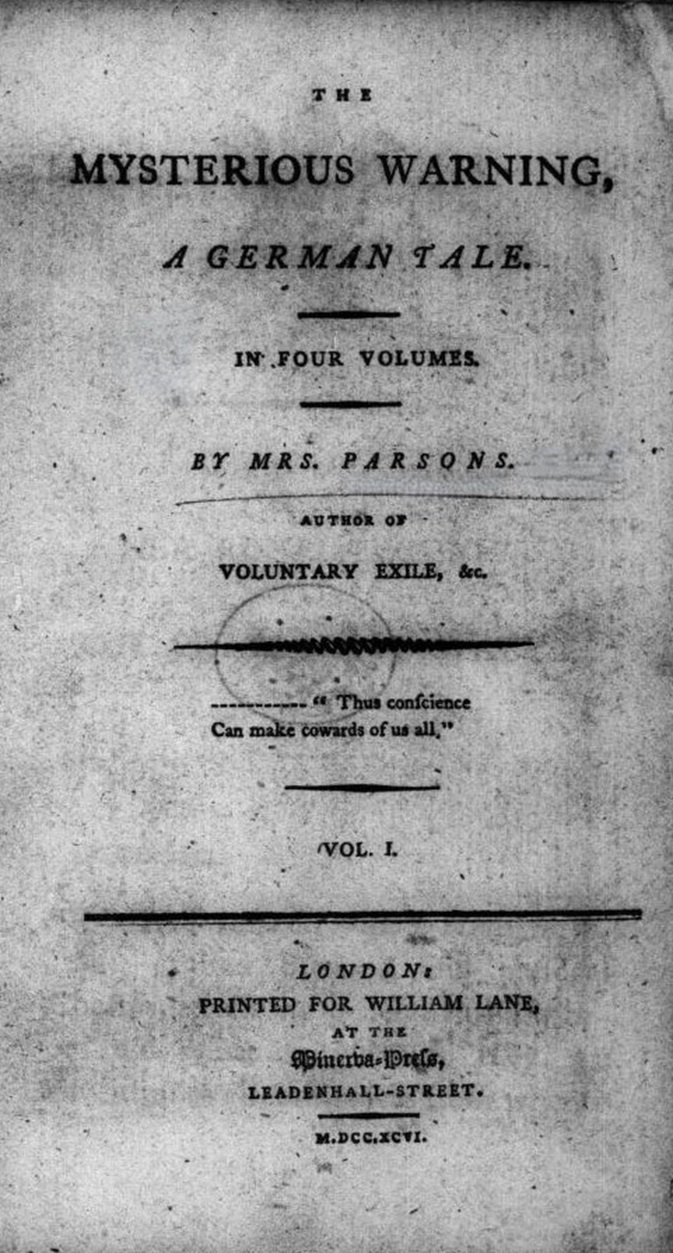
- First edition title page
- Author: Eliza Parsons
- Language: English
- Genre: Gothic fiction
- Publisher: Minerva Press
- Publication date: 14 December 1795
- Publication place: United Kingdom
- Media type: Print (Hardback & Paperback)
- Pages: c.200 pp

The Mysterious Warning: A German Tale is a novel by the English gothic novelist Eliza Parsons. It was first published in 1795 and is one of the seven "horrid novels" lampooned in Jane Austen's Northanger Abbey.

Dear creature! How much I am obliged to you; and when you have finished Udolpho, we will read the Italian together; and I have made out a list of ten or twelve more of the same kind for you.

Have you, indeed! How glad I am! What are they all?

I will read you their names directly; here they are, in my pocketbook. Castle of Wolfenbach, Clermont, Mysterious Warnings, Necromancer of the Black Forest, Midnight Bell, Orphan of the Rhine, and Horrid Mysteries. Those will last us some time.

Yes, pretty well; but are they all horrid, are you sure they are all horrid?

—Northanger Abbey, ch. 6

Subtitled "a German Tale" it was first published in London by the sensationalist Minerva Press and contains many familiar gothic tropes, including dark family secrets, incest, seduction, and ghostly apparitions.

== Editions ==
- 1824, London: S. Fisher
- 1835, London: Joseph Smith
- 1968, London: Folio Press
- 2007, Valancourt Books ISBN 978-1-934555-34-7
