= The Castle of Wolfenbach =

1793 Gothic novel by Eliza Parsons

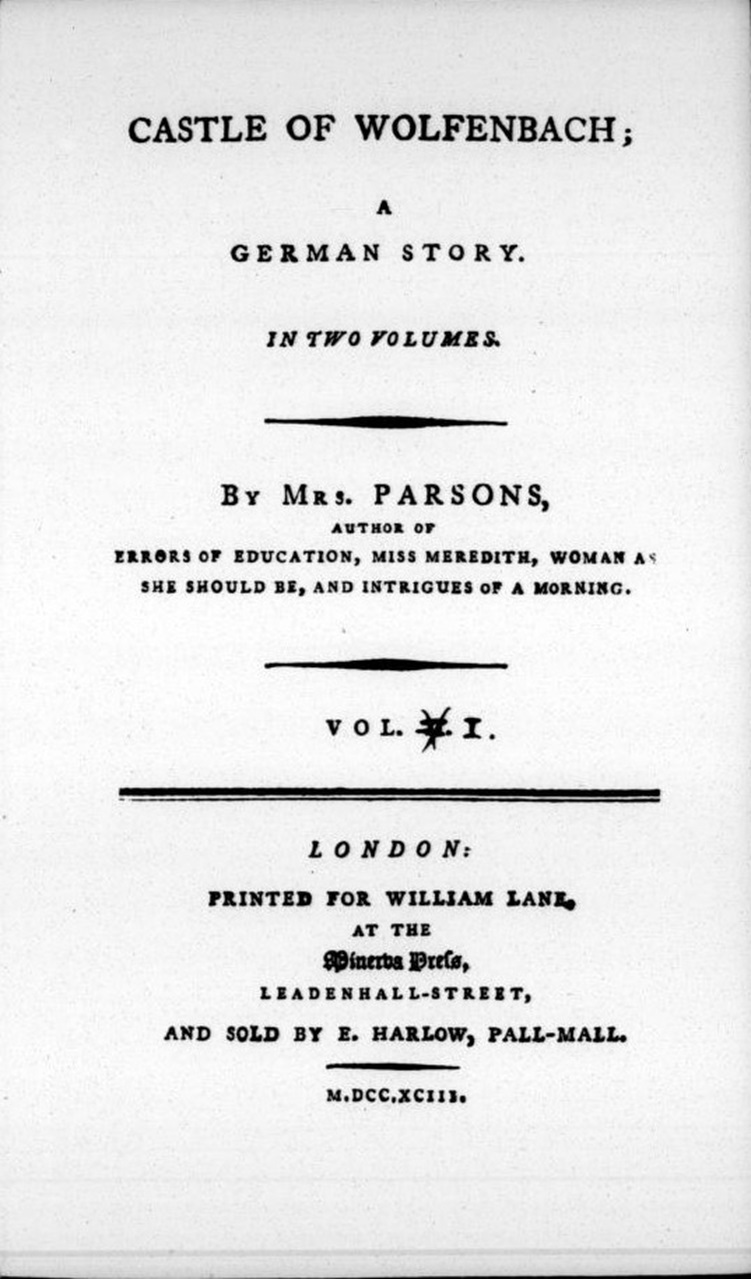
- First edition title page
- Author: Eliza Parsons
- Language: English
- Genre: Gothic fiction
- Publisher: Minerva Press
- Publication date: 1793
- Publication place: Great Britain
- Media type: Print (hardback & paperback)
- Pages: c. 200 pp

The Castle of Wolfenbach (1793) is a Gothic novel by the English author Eliza Parsons. First published in two volumes in 1793, it is among the seven "horrid novels" recommended by the character Isabella Thorpe in Jane Austen's novel Northanger Abbey and an important early work in the genre, predating Ann Radcliffe's The Mysteries of Udolpho and Matthew Lewis's The Monk.

Dear creature! How much I am obliged to you; and when you have finished Udolpho, we will read The Italian together; and I have made out a list of ten or twelve more of the same kind for you.

Have you, indeed! How glad I am! What are they all?

I will read you their names directly; here they are, in my pocketbook. Castle of Wolfenbach, Clermont, Mysterious Warnings, Necromancer of the Black Forest, Midnight Bell, Orphan of the Rhine, and Horrid Mysteries. Those will last us some time.

Yes, pretty well; but are they all horrid, are you sure they are all horrid?

Northanger Abbey, Chapter 6

Jane Austen names The Castle of Wolfenbach in her novel Northanger Abbey to portray the Gothic novel as forming around a society of its own, giving evidence of readership and cross-class and cross-gender interest in the Gothic novel. It contains the standard gothic tropes of the blameless damsel in distress, the centrality of a huge, gloomy, ancient building to the plot, the discovery of scandalous family secrets, and a final confrontation between forces of good and evil. Its resolutely anti-Catholic, pro–English Protestant sentiment is also a feature of the genre.

== Major characters ==
Matilda Weimar: a supposed orphan, raised by her incestuous, murderous uncle in Germany. She's a damsel in distress, but also the novel's heroine; "bearing the conventional attributes of a Gothic hero: honesty, beauty, and courageousness." She falls in love with the Count De Bouville, befriends the Countess of Wolfenbach and the Marchioness de Melfort, and strives to find her ancestral background throughout the novel.
Mr. Weimar: Matilda's uncle, who has plans to rape and marry her. It is revealed that he loved Matilda's mother and killed Matilda's father (his own brother) in his drastic attempts to win the love of his sister-in-law. He is the villain of Matilda's story line, but is eventually pardoned by her.
Victoria, Countess of Wolfenbach: The lady of the "haunted" castle, wife of the Count. She has been held hostage in the castle for 19 years by her vengeful husband the Count, as punishment for accepting letters from her true love, the Chevalier. She eventually escapes and finds comfort in the friendship of Matilda. (Her pseudonym while in London is Madame LeRoche.)
Count Wolfenbach: the evil owner of the castle and villain of Victoria's story line, whose villainy abounds, from imprisoning his wife, absconding of their son, murdering countless characters, and showing a penchant for arson.
Count de Bouville: Matilda's true love, French by birth, he promises to marry her, though they are of different social classes. His heroism is shown as he crosses Europe in search of her.
Charlotte, Marchioness de Melfort: Victoria's sister, aid and friend to Matilda in France
Marquis de Melfort: Charlotte's husband
Mademoiselle de Fontelle: A French coquette who lusts after the Count de Bouville and is the avowed enemy of Matilda
Mrs. Maria Courtney: protector of Victoria in London, she is also amorous towards the Count de Bouville and grows to hate Matilda.
Lord Delby: Mrs. Courtney's uncle: he later weds Victoria.
Mother Hermine Magdalene: Matilda's favourite nun at the Annunciate Convent in England

== Minor characters ==
Albert: Matilda's loyal servant, who escapes to the Castle of Wolfenbach with her
Margarite: Victoria's elderly servant while imprisoned in the Castle, she is murdered by the Count of Wolfenbach.
Adelaide de Bouville (later de Clermont): the young Count's sister
Monsieur de Clermont: Adelaide's fiancée, and later her husband
Chevalier de Montreville: Victoria's first true love, slain by the Count of Wolfenbach before Victoria's imprisonment
Count Berniti: Matilda's murdered father, a Neapolitan
Countess Berniti (nee Morlini): Matilda's mother
Joseph: the gardener and caretaker of the Castle of Wolfenbach. He knows that the Countess of Wolfenbach resides in the other tower of the castle and took an oath never to reveal the secret to anyone.
Bertha: Joseph's wife and the other caretaker of the castle. Though married to Joseph and living in the castle, she does not know the Countess of Wolfenbach resides there.
Captain: master of the Turkish ship that overtakes Matilda and Weimar's vessel, a virtuous pirate

== Plot ==
=== Volume 1 ===
Matilda Weimar and her servant Albert arrive at a cottage inhabited by two peasants, Pierre and his wife Jaqueline. Matilda is ill for unknown reasons and there is no bed for her to rest in, so they go to the neighbouring haunted Castle of Wolfenbach, whose caretakers take them in. That night, Matilda hears chains and groans and asks Joseph about the noises next morning. He says he and his wife never hear them. Bertha then explains that Count Wolfenbach is the owner and he is a cruel man who locked up his wife and children, and they died. They are the ghosts that one hears. Matilda ventures up into the tower where the noises come from and encounters a lady and her servant. Matilda tells them the story of her life: her parents died while she was an infant and she was brought up by her uncle. She had a good upbringing with her servants Agatha and Albert, but her uncle started to "caress" her and she overheard his plan to rape her, so Matilda and Albert fled. The lady then says that she has a sister, the Marquise de Melfort in France and that Joseph knows she resides up there. The lady offers Matilda to live with her sister in France.

The next day, Matilda goes to converse with the lady of the castle again, but she is gone and the room is in disorder. Joseph and she find the lady's servant murdered on the bed. Matilda leaves to go to France and tell the lady's sister about her kidnapping. Count Wolfenbach arrives after Matilda leaves and tells Joseph that he has sold the property and Bertha and he are moving to another property of his. That night, Joseph wakes up to a fire in his room and escapes, but Bertha does not. The castle is burnt to the ground and Bertha is dead.

In France, Matilda is staying with the Marquise de Melfort and we learn that the Lady of the Castle is the Countess of Wolfenbach. Matilda tells Charlotte, The Marquise, of her sister's kidnapping. Matilda receives a letter from Joseph telling her about the castle and Bertha's ill fate. She shows the Marquise, and the Marquise decides to tell her about the Countess of Wolfenbach's past. Victoria was in love with a man, Chevalier, but their father made her marry Count Wolfenbach because he was rich and powerful. The Count later sent the Marquise a letter saying that Victoria had died in childbirth along with their newly born child. A few weeks after that, the Marquise received a letter from Victoria saying she was alive. Matilda sees the Count de Bouville and falls in love with him right away and the love is reciprocated.

Matilda's uncle shows up at the Hotel de Melfort to get Matilda to marry him, but the Marquise sends him away and Matilda falls desperately ill after hearing this news. Matilda agrees to see him under the circumstance that the Marquise is in the other room listening to their conversation. Matilda and her uncle, Mr. Weimar, meet and he explains that she misunderstood his intentions of raping her. He then says that he is not her uncle, but rather Agatha found her at the gate and they decided to keep her and he now wants to marry her. The Marquise receives a letter from Victoria saying she is safe with a lady named Mrs. Courtney in England. Mr. Weimar tells Matilda she has to marry him, but she refuses, saying she is joining a convent.

The Marquise and Matilda go to London, where they meet up with the Countess of Wolfenbach and she tells them the story of her kidnapping. The Count and a servant burst into her apartment at the Castle of Wolfenbach accusing her of breaking her oath by talking to Matilda and Joseph when she is supposed not to communicate with anyone. They kill Margarite, her servant, so she will not tell any more secrets and take Victoria to the woods to kill her. The Count's horse bucks him and the servant goes to aid him while Victoria escapes. Mrs. Courtney finds her and accompanies her to London.

Next, the Countess tells the reader of her fatal marriage to the Count; she was exchanging letters with her true love, Chevalier, but the Count intercepted one of them and killed Chevalier right in front of the Countess and locked her in a closet with his bloody corpse. The Countess went into labour and delivered a son whom the Count took away from her and faked both of their deaths. Her punishment for communicating with the Chevalier was having her son taken away and she was to be locked up in the Castle and he made Joseph take an oath to never tell anyone, even Bertha, of her occupancy there.

=== Volume 2 ===
The second volume of The Castle of Wolfenbach begins immediately after The Countess of Wolfenbach reveals the story of her past. Then the reader finds out that Mr. Weimar is in England and has spoken to the French Ambassador in an attempt to regain control of her. The reader also finds out that the Count de Bouville has travelled to England to join his friends after the wedding of his sister and the death of his mother. The Marquis consults first the French Ambassador and then the German Ambassador concerning Matilda's situation. It is agreed that Matilda will remain under the protection for one year, during which time her parentage will be investigated. If no information about her ancestry is discovered, Mr. Weimar will regain custody of Matilda. The Count de Bouville, realising he loves Matilda, proposes to her.

"Your story, which the Marquis related, convinced me you had every virtue which should adorn your sex, joined with a courage and perseverance, through difficulties which might do honor even to our's. Since I have been admitted a visitor in this house, I have been confirmed in the exalted opinion I entertained of your superiority to most women, and under this conviction I may justly fear you will condemn my presumption, in offering myself and fortune to your disposal."

Matilda rejects the Count de Bouville's proposal, not because she doesn't love him, but because she comes from an obscure background.

"Ah! Sir, (said she, involuntarily) hate you! Heaven is my witness, that did my birth and rank equal yours, it would be my glory to accept your hand; but as there exists not a possibility of that, I beseech you to spare me and yourself unnecessary pain; from this instant determine to avoid me, and I will esteem you as the most exalted of men".

Attending the ball at night in the Lord Chamberlain's box, Matilda meets Mademoiselle De Fontelle again. Unbeknownst to Matilda, Mademoiselle has spent her time in England spreading vicious rumours about Matilda's past and causing harm to her in the eyes of society. Once Matilda learns of these rumours, she decides to retire into an Ursuline convent in Boulogne, France, where she strikes up an intimate friendship with Mother Magdalene, a nun who has lived there for ten years.

Meanwhile, Mrs. Courtney has misconstrued the niceties and pleasantries of the Count de Bouville as overtures towards a more intimate relationship: she becomes convinced that the Count wishes to marry her. So she writes a letter to Matilda informing her of the imagined romance and intimates that they will soon be married. Matilda, now under the false impression that the Count's affections for her were only cursory, congratulates Mrs. Courtney on the match. She incorrectly assumes that the marriage has taken place and resigns herself to an austere convent life.

One day the Marquis receives a letter from London from the German Ambassador, stating that the Count of Wolfenbach is dying and wishes to make amends to his wife. The Countess travels to see her dying husband and hears his confession before his death.

After Matilda's friends leave the area on matters of business or pleasure, Mr. Weimar travels to her convent and demands that she accompany him. The Mother Superior tells Matilda that she cannot legally protect Matilda. Mother Magdalene advises Matilda to write a few lines explaining her situation to both the Marquis and the Countess of Wolfenbach before leaving with Mr. Weimar, who, after a long journey, embarks with Matilda on a boat to Germany.

A few days into their voyage, the boat is attacked by Barbary Corsairs. Mr. Weimar, thinking he is undone, stabs Matilda before turning the knife on himself: "I am undone, unfortunate girl; you have been my ruin and your own, but I will prevent both" (p. 162). The pirates spare Matilda's life and at her request nurse Mr. Weimar back to health. While on his sickbed, Mr. Weimar reveals that Matilda is actually the daughter of his older brother, the Count Berniti (whom Mr. Weimar murdered) and Countess Berniti, who is still living with her family in Italy. The pirate captain, unhappy with his, promises to deliver Matilda to her newly discovered mother.

Meanwhile, the Count de Bouville has learnt of Matilda's abduction and follows through Europe, finally finding her in the company of her mother, the Marquis and Marchioness, Lord Delby, and the Countess of Wolfenbach.

The novel ends with Lord Delby's marriage to the Countess of Wolfenbach and Matilda's marriage to the Count de Bouville. Mr. Weimar enters a Carthusian monastery and plans to spend the rest of his life in penitence for his criminal and immoral actions.

== Historical context ==
The French Revolution was a major event as Parsons was writing The Castle of Wolfenbach. There are references to it throughout the book. The event that "began" it was the burning of the prison Bastille, a castle-like structure. This feeds the burning of the Castle of Wolfenbach in Parson's novel and displays the influence of the French Revolution on her writings, as she adopts scenes, ideas and politics from it in shaping the novel. It marked the first effective challenge to monarchical absolutism on behalf of popular sovereignty, creating a republican government in France and spreading such ideals in other European countries. The French Revolution urged natural rights and gave novelists enthusiasm for liberty and sovereignty of the people. Likewise, Matilda and other Gothic-novel heroines have been robbed of their birthrights and must war to reclaim them. Matilda has to flee and confront her uncle to recover her right to know who her true parents are. The French Revolution not only impacted France, but Europe as a whole, including Britain. "As a response to fears of a lost British identity, Gothic novels (like The Castle of Wolfenbach) reaffirm authentic cultural values culled from the past. They do this first by copying the ways of the past, rather than breaking sharply with it. Further, some Gothic novels do more than rehearse the past or figure it as a presence that haunts the present in an unwelcome manner; they may alternatively (or simultaneously) figure the past as a lost Golden Age that can be recovered." The Castle of Wolfenbach is likewise set in the past and in a distant land, yet deals with contemporary issues such as identity loss, marriage and choices. The rise of supernatural fiction coincides with that of contemporary consumerism. The reading public expanded through new ways to distribute and market books. The Gothic novel correlates with the French Revolution, as the outbreak of Terror and explosion of demand for terror fiction make clear.

=== Hiding and secrecy ===
The theme of hiding (and remaining hidden) and secrecy recurs throughout The Castle of Wolfenbach. an 18th-century British Critic reviewer already identifies the theme of secrecy and hiding by showing how the plot is so written as to "vanish into thin air". Apart from the way the plot is constructed, the theme of hiding and secrecy appears in characters physically hiding and evading detection or keeping their past secret. This applies to several Castle of Wolfenbach characters.

The novel begins with Matilda and her servant Albert coming to the home of Jacqueline and Pierre as she seeks refuge from her Uncle, Mr. Weimar, arriving as someone wholly dependent on Jacqueline and Pierre, without friends, family or history.). This makes her hiding easier, as there is nothing by which she can be readily identified. A sick Matilda asks to stay with Jacqueline and Pierre, but they have no place for her – she and Albert go to the Castle of Wolfenbach, which is rumoured to be haunted. As Matilda seeks refuge there, we meet the first example of the hiding/secrecy theme. Matilda arrives having no idea that the castle has secrets of its own. It is rumoured to be haunted, but this haunting is actually produced by the caretaker, Joseph. He has been instructed by the Count to keep the Count's wife, Victoria, locked up there and her status as an occupant a secret. Joseph must even disguise this from his wife Bertha, the second caretaker of the castle. The Count of Wolfenbach has previously faked the death of Victoria and their son. The Count has hidden Victoria so as not to arouse suspicion. Not only is Joseph given the task of keeping Victoria hidden, but he is also to make the castle seem haunted, by rattling chains and making other haunting, frightening noises that will keep others away and further reduce the chance of Victoria being found. Joseph must keep the Countess's presence secret, for he would be murdered if he ever "betrayed her place of residence, or life, to any one.

The employment of seemingly supernatural events or an "invisible hand" to disguise the truth is not a new strategy employed by Parsons, but is consistent with other Gothic novels of the time such as The Castle of Otranto and The Mysteries of Udolpho. The concept of the invisible hand is evident when Matilda finds lines written in the window that detail the grief and torment of Victoria, who is unknown to Matilda at the time she reads it. The anonymity of the lines etched into the window provides another example of how identities are kept secret. As the reader of the lines, Matilda can learn only what the writer wants her to know, while other aspects of the author's life are kept secret and hidden.

A prominent story line in the novel is what the Count did with Victoria and their child after faking both their deaths and keeping her locked in his castle. This is revealed later as the Count explains how Victoria's son is both alive and an "officer now in the Emperor's service. After revealing this to Victoria, the Count relates what has transpired since he faked the deaths and left them. He admits he was unable to live peacefully with his deeds weighing heavily on his mind, and how fearful he was that they would one day be discovered, so that "life became a burthen (burden) to me." Furthermore, the Count details how he searched the Countess' apartment, found evidence of Matilda being there and soon after drugged Joseph with opium, locked all the windows and doors, and then set fire to the castle. The Count goes on to discuss how he left the castle and waited for the news of it being burned down. He then feigned distress and sadness about the loss of Joseph and his wife and was consoled by others for his loss with no one suspecting that he was the one who actually started the fire. In addition, the Count discusses his plans to murder both Victoria and her servant, Margarite, so that there would be no remaining people who could reveal his secret. He was able to kill Margarite and as he took Victoria to the woods to kill her, he was thrown from his horse and Victoria was able to escape as the Count and his servant were distracted.

Another example of secrecy is the true identity of Mr. Weimar. He raised Matilda as her uncle, but Matilda flees his care after he began making advances, attempting to seduce and even rape her. On finding her, he reveals to Matilda that he was never really her uncle, but took charge of her when he found her abandoned on his property.). Mr. Weimar does his best to convince Matilda of this lie, which would license his attempt to convince her to marry him, but Matilda avoids this by entering a convent. Later, as Mr. Weimar is close to death, he again changes his story, telling Matilda what he says is the truth about her past and his involvement in it, notably his role in the death of her father and how he came to be her main guardian. In doing so, he reveals who Matilda's real parents are: her father was Count Berniti, Mr. Weimar's brother, whom Mr. Weimar hated for marrying the woman that Weimar had lusted after. She also learns that Mr. Weimar killed her father by ambushing him in the woods and stabbing him repeatedly until he died. He then made it look as if Count Berniti had been a victim of robbers by taking Count Berniti's valuables from his pockets and leaving the body. He then describes the search for Count Berniti's murderer and how he could convince her of his sorrow, so that he would not be a suspect in the murder. He then tells how he went to Agatha's room, found her child had died, and asked her to substitute the dead child for the Countess's living one. After those events, Mr. Weimar states, he was unable to stay there and moved away, buying property under the name Weimar and creating a new identity for himself.

== Literary themes ==
=== Fainting and weeping ===
As the novel as a legitimate form emerged through the 18th century, sensationalist and theatrical elements of fiction were being explored as grossly popular characteristics of the Gothic. A common trope of the Gothic novel was excess sentimentality – The Castle of Wolfenbach is no exception. This presents itself as inability in its heroines to take control of their worldly bodies in the face of supernatural terror, villainous deeds or romantic gestures. Heroines swoon, weep and act "as if enraptured, delirious, or frenzied" whenever confronted with something extraordinary.

In The Castle of Wolfenbach, the heroine Matilda Weimar and the secondary heroine, Victoria Wolfenbach, are subject to regular fits of fainting. Sometimes they are saved from losing consciousness by material objects in their path as they fall. It could be a chair ("She sunk fainting into a chair.") smelling salts ("She turned sick and faint, was obliged to have recourse to her salts.") or best of all, the arms of a lover ("down she dropped, and had not the Count been attentive to her motions, and caught her in his arms, she must have fallen to the ground.") More often than not, however, the heroines have no dashing men, furniture or chemicals to protect their fall and must finish their frenzy of sentimentality on the cold, merciless ground: "[I] fell senseless," or "in a few minutes afterwards I fell senseless from my seat".

While fainting in The Castle of Wolfenbach is excessive, weeping is still more so. Victoria and Matilda weep four times as often as they faint; their tears are as varied in cause as copious in amount. They deplore their fates: "'What can I – what ought I to do?' cried she, shedding a torrent of tears"; they exit a room heroically: "She quitted the apartment with a flood of tears"; they express relief: "A friendly burst of tears relieved her beating heart"; they show gratitude: "Matilda's grateful heart overflowed; speech indeed was not lent her, but her tears, her expressive looks forcibly conveyed the language she could not utter"; it acts as an emotional outlet: "I must have vent for my feelings, or I shall be opprest to death. She burst into tears"; Tears also accompany mourning of dead children, reunion of lost family members, and hearing and telling of personal tragedies. Wherever she can, Parsons has characters weep. In fact Matilda and Victoria spend most of their time alternately weeping and fainting, as though they were favourite pastimes.

As William Beckford satirises the nonsense of Gothic romance in Azemia and Jane Austen the dangers of subscribing to a Gothic lifestyle in Northanger Abbey, the fits of fainting and weeping, so common in the works of Parsons and her contemporaries, are parodied in countless responses, from 1807's anonymous Men and Women, to Eaton Stannard Barrett's The Heroine. Barrett's heroine is named Cherry, and for her the model of a heroine in the Gothic sense is one who "blushes to the tips of her fingers, and when mere misses would laugh, she faints. Besides, she has tears, sighs, and half-sighs, always ready." The concept of the Gothic heroine as a woman who alternately faints and weeps was rooted in literary and popular culture.

This parodying of the heroine is not baseless. As scholar Angela Wright has commented, "The character of a Gothic heroine is seemingly a tabula rasa which exists to be over-written by emotions and overwhelming memories." It is as if the Gothic heroine were a blank slate, and all that was needed to fill it was emotion and tragic circumstances. This recipe that Parsons utilises unabashed for Victoria and Matilda. It is this poor characterisation, based solely on emotionalism, that causes many to criticise the Gothic novelist as inferior, and gives way to easy parody.

The Castle of Wolfenbach walks a fine line between realistic and theatrical. As scholar Robert Kiely has pointed out, Gothic abounds in theatricality and "the works [of romantic novelists] often seem about to turn into plays or poems." It is almost impossible not to parody such unrealistic, sentimental plots. With fainting and weeping, the most theatrically ridiculous occurrence is when Matilda Weimar saves herself from fainting by a "copious flood of tears". Furthermore, the plot seems as if it could be easily given a Shakespearean format. It contains heroines on a quest, star-crossed lovers, property-scheming villains, bumbling servants, and "ghosts" on top of them all – Hamlet, Romeo and Juliet, King Lear and All's Well That Ends Well rolled into one; that is, if it were in the least bit realistically theatrical, rather than irredeemably ridiculous in its theatricality.

=== Finding an identity ===
Another theme in The Castle of Wolfenbach and often in Gothic novels as a genre, is secret parentage, unknown identity and questing to find oneself. As the Introduction to the Valancourt Edition points out, "[Matilda's] challenge in the novel is to discover the secret of her birth, find her parents, and inherit her rightful property." Robert Miles, in his genealogy of Gothic writing, claims that in these novels "the usurped and disposed find their rights restored; the lost are found, and a true genealogy reasserts itself." In fact, these things happen to Matilda; she discovers her parentage, finds her mother and inherits her noble class title. The Gothic and Romantic genres are obsessed with perfect, unsullied aristocratic lineages. It is Matilda's unwritten and unknown history that keeps her so long apart from her true love, the Count de Bouville; she cannot admit that she loves him until she discovers her ancestry: "She was of noble birth; no unlawful offspring, no child of poverty: then she thought of the Count.".

As often the case with heroines, most of her friends are convinced of her goodness and beauty even before her noble lineage comes to light. Matilda's true identity is hinted sporadically:

Marquis de Melfort: If there is a mystery in her birth, time may yet bring it to light (p. 71).

Marquis de Melfort: I have no doubt but one time or other a discovery will take place to her advantage (p. 78).
Matilda: Yes, I have a pre-sentiment that I am no base-born unworthy offspring (p. 83).
Marquis de Melfort: For my own part I have little doubt but her birth is noble; her person, her figure, the extraordinary natural selection she possesses confirms my opinion that so many graces seldom belong to a mean birth or dishonest connexions (p. 72).
Marchioness de Melfort: You sprung not from humble or dishonest parents, – the virtues you possess are hereditary ones, doubt it not, my dear Matilda; if nobleness of birth can add any lustre to qualities like your's, you will one day possess that advantage (p. 124).

Mother Magdalene: 'tis possible you have parents still living, who may one day fold you to their bosoms.... you have no right to dispose of your future destiny, whilst there is the least probable chance you may be reclaimed (p. 148).

== Publication history ==
The novel was advertised as forthcoming in late October 1793, and was published in London by William Lane’s Minerva Press. A second edition followed the next year. There were several nineteenth-century reprints, in 1824, 1835, 1839, and 1894.

Alongside the other Northanger novels, The Castle of Wolfenbach was reissued in 1968 by the Folio Press, edited by Devendra P. Varma, and in 2006 by Valancourt Books, edited by Diane Long Hoeveler. Hoeveler complains that Varma’s edition "radically alters the novel’s punctuation, apparently in an attempt to modernize it"; the Valancourt edition preserves "archaic spellings and punctuation" but silently corrects other errors.

- 1793, London: William Lane (The Minerva Press)
- 1968, London: Folio Press
- 2003, Wildside Press ISBN 1-59224-344-4
- 2004, Kessinger Publishing ISBN 978-1-4191-5616-8
- 2006, Valancourt Books ISBN 978-0-9777841-6-5
- 2023, Read & Co ISBN 978-1-528722-74-2

== Popular culture ==
This novel is the book read by Mary Shelley (Elle Fanning) at the beginning of the film Mary Shelley (2017) by Haifaa al-Mansour.
