= Northanger Abbey =

1818 novel by Jane Austen

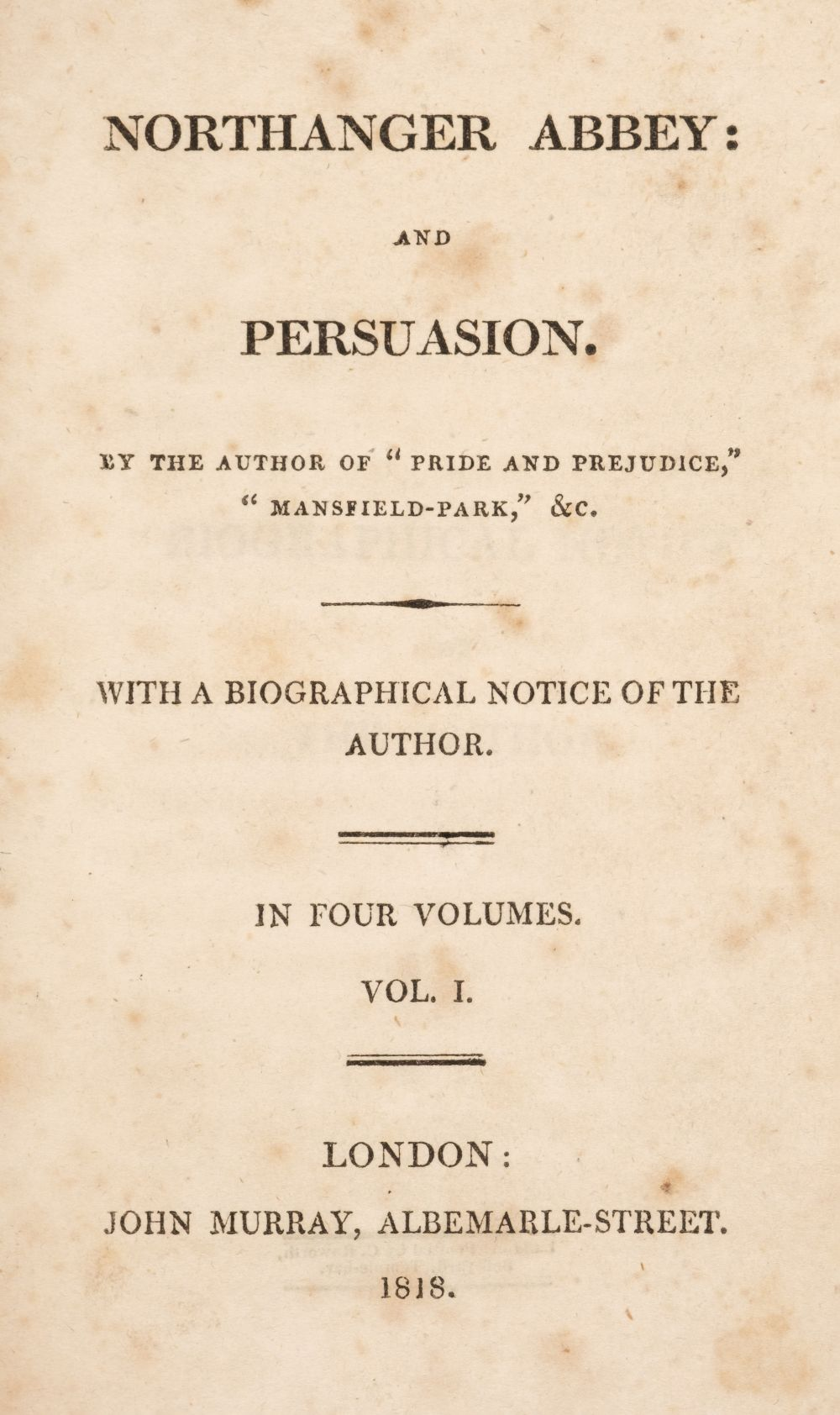
- Title page of the original 1818 edition
- Author: Jane Austen
- Language: English
- Genre: Gothic, satire, coming-of-age
- Publisher: John Murray
- Publication date: 1818 (published on 20 December 1817, although the title page is dated 1818)
- Publication place: United Kingdom
- Text: Northanger Abbey at Wikisource

Northanger Abbey (/ˈnɔːrθæŋər/ NOR-thang-ər), written by the English author Jane Austen, is a coming-of-age novel and a satire of Gothic novels. Although the title page is dated 1818 and the novel was published posthumously in 1817 with Persuasion, Northanger Abbey was actually completed some years earlier in 1799. From a fondness of Gothic novels and an active imagination distorting her worldview, the story follows Catherine Morland, the naïve young protagonist, as she develops a better understanding of herself and the world around her.

Based on the different styles and different references to Gothic novels, it is apparent that Austen wrote Northanger Abbey over the span of many years. Not until after her death was her brother finally able to obtain publication for the book. Once published, it received a mix of reviews. The novel covers a wide array of topics such as high society, Gothic fiction, bildungsroman, the value of reading, and the importance of time. This novel is considered to be more juvenile than her others.

Throughout Northanger Abbey, Austen makes references to many different Gothic novels, most notably Ann Radcliffe's The Mysteries of Udolpho. Northanger Abbey is credited for reviving interest in seven Gothic titles that had largely fallen into obscurity; the "horrid novels". There are also many references to Northanger Abbey in contemporary novels. It has been adapted for a number of films, television programmes, and stage plays.

== Plot ==
Seventeen-year-old Catherine Morland is one of ten children of a country clergyman. Although a tomboy in her childhood, she is "in training for a heroine" and is fond of reading Gothic novels "provided they [are] all story and no reflection."

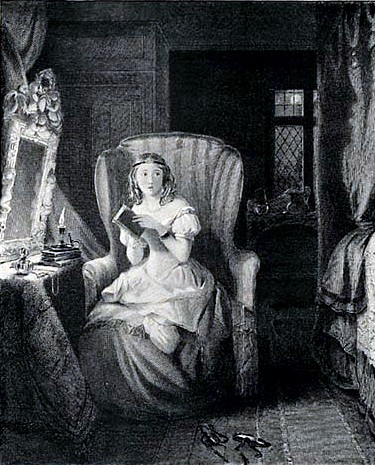
Catherine Morland in an illustration from an 1833 edition of the novel

The Allens (her wealthier neighbours in Fullerton) invite Catherine to accompany them in their visit to the city of Bath and partake in the winter season of balls, theatre and other social activities. Shortly after their arrival, she is introduced to a young gentleman, Henry Tilney, with whom she dances. Mrs Allen meets an old school friend, Mrs Thorpe, whose daughter, Isabella, quickly becomes friends with Catherine. Isabella introduces Catherine to Ann Radcliffe's 1794 Gothic novel Mysteries of Udolpho. Mrs Thorpe's son, John, is a friend of Catherine's older brother, James, at Oxford University where they are both students. The two young men come to Bath, where John is then introduced to Catherine.

The Thorpes are not happy about Catherine's friendship with the Tilneys. They correctly perceive Henry as a rival for Catherine's affections even though Catherine is not at all interested in John Thorpe. Despite Thorpe continually attempting to sabotage her relationship with the Tilneys, Catherine tries to maintain her friendships with both the Thorpes and the Tilneys. This leads to several misunderstandings, which put Catherine in the awkward position of having to explain herself to the Tilneys.

Isabella and James become engaged. James' father approves of the match and offers his son a country parson's living of a modest sum, £400 annually, but they must wait until he can obtain the benefice in two and a half years. Isabella is dissatisfied, but to Catherine, she misrepresents her distress as being caused solely by the delay, and not by the value of the sum. Isabella immediately begins to flirt with Captain Frederick Tilney, Henry's older brother. Innocent Catherine cannot understand her friend's behaviour, but Henry understands all too well as he knows his brother's character and habits.

The Tilneys invite Catherine to stay with them for a few weeks at their home, Northanger Abbey. Once at Northanger Abbey, Catherine and Eleanor Tilney, Henry and Frederick's younger sister, get to know each other better on a personal level. Catherine, in accordance with her novel reading, expects the house to be exotic and frightening. Henry teases her about this as it turns out that Northanger Abbey is pleasant and decidedly not Gothic. However, the house includes a mysterious suite of rooms that no one ever enters; Catherine learns that they were the apartments of Mrs Tilney, who died nine years earlier due to a serious illness, leaving Mr Tilney with three children to raise by himself. As General Tilney no longer appears to be affected by her death, Catherine decides that he may have imprisoned her in her chamber, or even murdered her.

Catherine discovers that her over-active imagination has led her astray as nothing is strange or distressing in the apartments. Henry finds and questions her; he surmises and informs her that his father loved his wife in his own way and was truly upset by her death. She leaves the apartments, crying, fearing that she has lost Henry's regard entirely. Realising how foolish she has been, Catherine comes to believe that, though novels may be delightful, their content does not relate to everyday life. Henry does not mention this incident to her again.

James writes to inform her that he has broken off his engagement to Isabella and implies that she has become engaged instead to Captain Tilney. Henry and Eleanor Tilney are sceptical that their brother has actually become engaged to Isabella Thorpe. Catherine is terribly disappointed, realising what a dishonest person Isabella is. A subsequent letter from Isabella herself confirms the Tilney siblings' doubts and shows that Frederick Tilney was merely flirting with Isabella. The General goes off to London, and the atmosphere at Northanger Abbey immediately becomes lighter and more pleasant from his absence. Catherine passes several enjoyable days with Henry and Eleanor until the General returns abruptly in a temper in Henry's absence. He forces Catherine to go home early the next morning in a shocking and unsafe mode that forces Catherine to undertake the 70 miles (110 km) journey alone.

At home, Catherine is listless and unhappy. Henry pays a sudden unexpected visit and explains what happened. General Tilney (on the misinformation of John Thorpe) had believed her to be exceedingly rich as the Allens' prospective heiress, and therefore a proper match for Henry. In London, General Tilney ran into Thorpe again, who, angry at Catherine's refusal of his earlier half-made proposal of marriage, said instead that she was nearly destitute. Enraged, General Tilney, (again on the misinformation of John Thorpe), returned home to evict Catherine. When Henry returned to Northanger, his father informed him of what had occurred and forbade him to think of Catherine again. When Henry learns how she had been treated, he breaks with his father and tells Catherine he still wants to marry her despite his father's disapproval. Catherine is delighted, though when Henry seeks her parents' approval, they tell the young couple that final approval will only happen when General Tilney consents.

Eventually, General Tilney acquiesces because Eleanor has become engaged to a wealthy and titled man; he discovers that the Morlands, while not extremely rich, are far from destitute.

== Composition ==
According to notes written by Austen's sister Cassandra after Jane's death in 1817, the novel was finished by 1798 or 1799. The close resemblance in style to Austen's "juvenilia" of the early 1790s together with several in-jokes that only the Austen family could have appreciated strongly suggests that the book was begun during that period, probably about 1794. However, the references to several Gothic novels published after 1794 would indicate Austen did not finish the book until about 1798 or 1799 as Cassandra Austen remembered. The scholar Cecil Emden argued that differences between the Catherine portrayed in the Bath section of the novel vs. the Catherine at Northanger Abbey were due to Austen finishing the book at a different stage of her life than when she started.

== Publication ==
Austen initially sold the novel, then titled Susan, for £10 to a London bookseller, Crosby & Co. in 1803. This publisher did not print the work but held on to the manuscript. Austen reportedly threatened to take her work back from them, but Crosby & Co responded that she would face legal consequences for reclaiming her text. In the spring of 1816, the bookseller sold it back to the novelist's brother, Henry Austen, for the same sum as they had paid for it. There is evidence that Austen further revised the novel in 1816–1817 with the intention of having it published. She rewrote sections, renaming the main character Catherine and using that as her working title.

After her death, Austen's brother Henry gave the novel its final name and arranged for publication of Northanger Abbey in late December 1817 (1818 given on the title page), as the first two volumes of a four-volume set, with a preface for the first time publicly identifying Jane Austen as the author of all her novels. Neither Northanger Abbey nor Persuasion was published under the working title Jane Austen used. Aside from first being published together, the two novels are not connected; later editions were published separately.

== Reputation ==
Northanger Abbey and Persuasion, published together posthumously in December 1817, were reviewed in the British Critic in March 1818 and in the Edinburgh Review and Literary Miscellany in May 1818. The reviewer for the British Critic felt that Austen's exclusive dependence on realism was evidence of a deficient imagination. The reviewer for the Edinburgh Review disagreed, praising Austen for her "exhaustless invention" and the combination of the familiar and the surprising in her plots.

Austen scholars have pointed out that these early reviewers did not know what to make of her novels – for example, they misunderstood her use of irony. Reviewers, for example, reduced Sense and Sensibility and Pride and Prejudice to didactic tales of virtue prevailing over vice.

== Major themes ==
As in all of Austen's novels, the subjects of society, status, behavior, and morality are addressed. Northanger Abbey, however, being chronologically the first novel completed by Austen (though revised later in her life), is notably considered a "point of departure" from her other work as a result of the "boldness with which it flaunts its ... deceptive air of simplicity with broad, bold humour".

=== Love, marriage and high society ===
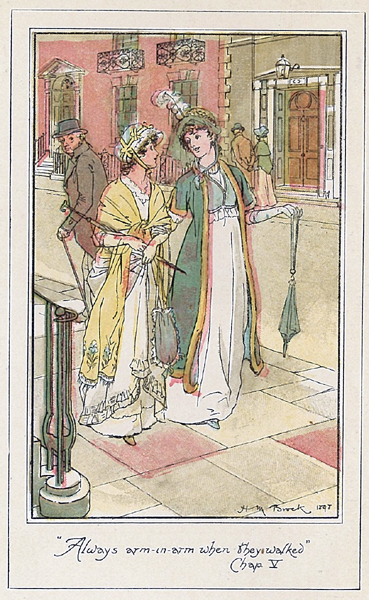
Isabella and Catherine walking arm and arm in an illustration by H. M. Brock from a 1904 edition of the novel

Throughout Northanger Abbey, Austen demonstrates the ways in which women are socially and economically disadvantaged. Beth Lau demonstrates how Austen depicts Isabella wanting to be of higher status by choosing Captain Tilney over James Morland. Isabella tries to shop around in marriage market even though she does not have any choices to make. In doing so, she is turning herself into a commodity with nothing to offer. The washing bill that Catherine finds in the abbey works to highlight the disadvantaged position women hold to men economically. It is because of women that men's economic position advances. To contrast the lack of choice women have in the economy, Austen uses the novel to give women a choice. Catherine is able to consume/buy novels rather than be a participant/commodity. Eleanor, however, is trapped within patriarchy through her selection to read masculine history instead of novels.

Both General Tilney and Captain Tilney work as examples of superficiality within the high society. With General Tilney, it is evident throughout the novel, but a specific clue is his obsession with fine china. This obsession showcases his greed and superficiality. Frederick, known as "the Captain," represents society's dual standards of behavior for men and women. Captain Tilney refuses to dance with any of the women because of his disregard for them. Due to his higher status, he believes he is better than the women present. He also adds to the mystique of the Tilney family: like father, like son. Frederick's actions make Henry and Eleanor more sympathetic characters, and his ruining of Isabella does the same for her character. Henry makes it clear that Captain Tilney is just using Isabella since he would not marry someone of lower status. Regina Jeffers notes that many readers perceive Frederick as nothing but selfish, greedy, and conniving.

When Henry tries to dissuade Catherine from her Gothic-inspired notion that General Tilney is a murderer, he cites male authors who were influential in establishing rules of proper conduct. This is an attempt to dismiss one genre that was popular with women with another genre that was popular with men. Austen uses this discourse of the essays as an example of imposing power over women by using a type of language that limits what one may think. Henry's speech is that expected in polite society in Britain at the time. The ingenue Catherine is unfamiliar with the ways of polite society. Henry establishes himself as worthy of being Catherine's husband in his role as a "lover mentor" who teaches Catherine the ways of polite society to allow her to eventually fit in.

=== Life lived as in a Gothic novel ===
By creating a heroine who is an ordinary girl, Austen is upending the traditional role of Gothic heroines. The way for Catherine to find happiness is by having an ordinary life, not one full of Gothic fantasy. When Catherine fears that General Tilney murdered his wife, it stems from her knowledge of Gothic novels. Her fears of fantastical evil prove to be false, but the book ends with her discovery of a realistic evil based on economic propositions. Once Catherine faces reality, she is able to find happiness. When General Tilney kicks her out of the abbey, she leaves easily, acting inwardly rather than outwardly. Waldo S. Glock argues that this is a display of her genuineness instead of sentimentality. Catherine's internal sadness showcases how she is not a typical Gothic heroine. To contrast, Isabella Thorpe acts more accurately as a Gothic heroine. Because of her insincerity, Isabella is more at danger of Gothic disillusionment and sentimental notions.

Austen uses elements of Gothic fiction as a tool to help showcase portions of the marriage plot. This is evident in the use of the cabinet at the abbey. When Henry comes up with a Gothic story to tease Catherine, he makes a joke about the narrator overlooking a cabinet that is crucial to the made-up story as a way to create tension. Overlooking a key detail is similar to the manner in which marriage plots conceal information to build suspense. Gothic fiction also helps reveal negative aspects of marriage that are not as obvious in a traditional courtship plot.

Northanger Abbey is a parody of Gothic fiction. One way that Austen achieves this is through the washing bill that Catherine finds in the abbey. Catherine thinks that there is an elaborate story behind the washing bills, but it leads to no big discovery. Austen reverses the expectation in Gothic fiction for there to be some sort of depth to a story with the washing bills. It also showcases Catherine as a victim of the economy for believing that the washing bill contained a larger story than it actually did. Susan Zlotnick highlights that it is common for Gothic novels to portray women as victims to the economy. Another way that Austen satirizes Gothic fiction is through the cabinet that Catherine finds the washing bills in. The cabinet is from Japan which plays on the Gothic idea of exoticism. It removes the exaggerated exotic feature to the scope of the room instead. In contrast, Robert Irvine, a British critic, argues that the interpretation of the novel as a complete satire of the Gothic genre is problematic even though parts of the book do satirize the Gothic novels popular in the 18th century. Northanger Abbey makes fun of the silliness of Gothic fiction but also praises it and depends on it to tell the story. Claudia L. Johnson notes in Jane Austen: Women, Politics, and the Novel that "Northanger Abbey does not refute, but rather clarifies and reclaims, gothic conventions in distinctly political ways," and that Austen's ridicule is directed more towards readers of Gothic fiction, rather than the novels themselves.

=== Bildungsroman ===
The story begins with the narrator remarking that the heroine is not really a heroine. The narrator describes Catherine as not especially clever, nor a great beauty, and good without being virtuous. When the narrator has anything positive to say about Catherine, it is attached with the adjective "extraordinary." Austen uses this term ironically since Catherine's traits are actually rather ordinary. Another aspect of Catherine that makes her seem not really like a heroine is that she does not have any ambitions outside of being with Henry. Because she actually has ambitions, Isabella appears more like a heroine, but it is those ambitions that turn her into a comedic villain. By creating a protagonist who does not fit the traditional role of a heroine, Austen is satirizing how women were portrayed in contemporary literature.

At the beginning of the novel, Catherine has a hard time interpreting the actions of the people around her, especially Isabella. She does not understand Isabella's contradictory actions because she can not understand that there is a double meaning to what Isabella says. This creates confusion for Catherine which forces her to realize that she should not rely solely on others who are negative influences, such as Isabella. Her inability to understand Isabella's contradictory actions has to do with Catherine's inability to grasp both the fictional and the real world. However, Catherine develops to realize that she should be an independent thinker.

Though Austen encourages her audience to read novels, Catherine must learn to separate life from fiction and to rein in her very active imagination. By focusing only on Gothic novels, Catherine is not able to interact with others properly. On the other hand, it is her novel reading that transforms her into a heroine and causes her to be an active character. Henry also plays a role in Catherine's development from his teachings. By the end of the novel, Catherine understands that people are not completely good nor completely bad. For example, she does not see Henry as without any faults. She recognizes that he has a superior attitude towards those he thinks are inferior to him.

=== The value of reading ===
Northanger Abbey is a story about reading novels. Laura Jeanne Baudot highlights this point through the discussion of the washing bill Catherine finds in a cabinet at the abbey. Through the washing bill, Austen draws the audience's attention to the clothes that the fantasy man who marries Eleanor wears. Austen is forcing the audience to conjure up a cliché image of what the man looks like. In doing so, Austen is reminding the audience of their current act of reading. The body of the man reminds the audience of the physical act of reading a book. It is clear that Austen is defending novel reading. Specifically, Henry Tilney, the hero of Northanger Abbey, is an ideal reader. Jodi L. Wyett classifies Henry as an ideal reader because of his knowledge about different texts from different genres. This flips the gender hierarchy by showing men as novel readers instead of women. An early sign that Henry Tilney is the hero instead of John Thorpe is that the former likes to read books while the latter does not. John Thorpe's lack of interest in reading novels, specifically in reading Radcliffe's novels, makes him boorish. It is hard for Catherine to connect with him because Catherine uses novels as a conversation starter.

=== The importance of time ===
Various scholars such as the French historian Michel Foucault and the British historian E.P. Thompson have argued that the 18th century became the "era of the clock" as availability of mass-produced clocks and watches allowed time to be measured more accurately. From these devices creating a new increased emphasis on time management, Thompson called this era the beginning of "time discipline." As a result of living in the new era of "time discipline", Austen frequently uses clocks as symbols of General Tilney's authority over Northanger Abbey. General Tilney is always checking his watch and is most insistent that the servants as well as his own family observe the clocks to make sure they are on time. Because of the importance of staying on schedule, even when General Tilney is not around, clocks serve as a symbol of his power as Catherine finds herself always checking the time. After arriving at Northanger Abbey, Catherine discovers that everything at the abbey happens on a strict schedule because of General Tilney. This is a marked difference from Catherine's lax attitude that she displays in Bath. Catherine compares General Tilney to a clock, as something inhuman and mechanical that operates with no regard to the human body. When Catherine visits the kitchen at Northanger Abbey, she notes that it is equipped with all manner of "modern" cooking equipment and that the cooks work in an efficient manner like soldiers performing a drill. This is a direct reflection of the General's wish to have everything ordered.

== Family entertainment ==
According to Austen biographer Claire Tomalin, "there is very little trace of personal allusion in the book, although it is written more in the style of a family entertainment than any of the others". Joan Aiken writes: "We can guess that Susan [the original title of Northanger Abbey], in its first outline, was written very much for family entertainment, addressed to a family audience, like all Jane Austen's juvenile works, with their asides to the reader, and absurd dedications; some of the juvenilia, we know, were specifically addressed to her brothers Charles and Frank; all were designed to be circulated and read by a large network of relations."

== Allusions to other works ==
Isabella: Dear creature! how much I am obliged to you; and when you have finished The Mysteries of Udolpho, we will read The Italian together; and I have made out a list of ten or twelve more of the same kind for you.

[...]

Catherine: ...but are they all horrid, are you sure they are all horrid?

Isabella: Yes, quite sure, for a particular friend of mine, a Miss Andrews, a sweet girl, one of the sweetest creatures in the world, has read every one of them.

— Jane Austen, Northanger Abbey, chapter VI

Several Gothic novels and authors are mentioned in the book, including Fanny Burney and The Monk. Isabella Thorpe gives Catherine a list of seven books that are commonly referred to as the "Northanger 'horrid' novels". These works were thought to be of Austen's own invention until the 1920s, when British writers Montague Summers and Michael Sadleir found that the novels did exist. The list is as follows:

1. Castle of Wolfenbach (1793) by Eliza Parsons. London: Minerva Press.
2. Clermont (1798) by Regina Maria Roche. London: Minerva Press.
3. The Mysterious Warning, a German Tale (1796) by Eliza Parsons. London: Minerva Press.
4. The Necromancer; or, The Tale of the Black Forest (1794) by "Lawrence Flammenberg" (pseudonym for Karl Friedrich Kahlert; translated by "Peter Teuthold," pseudonym for Peter Will). London: Minerva Press.
5. The Midnight Bell (1798) by Francis Lathom. London: H. D. Symonds.
6. The Orphan of the Rhine (1798) by Eleanor Sleath. London: Minerva Press. Tenille Nowak has noted that critics and editors of Northanger Abbey often suggest that the names Laurentina and St Aubin appearing in the text are misrememberings of character names from Udolpho; Nowak observes that due to there being very few copies of The Orphan of the Rhine available these critics did not realise that the names actually appear in their exact form in Sleath's novel. Nowak observes other instances where Sleath's novel is echoed by Austen, particularly in her descriptions of place.
7. Horrid Mysteries (1796), which is an abridged translation by Peter Will of Carl Grosse's The Genius. London: Minerva Press. (Marquis de Grosse's The Genius or the Mysterious Adventures of Don Carlos de Grandez was later translated by Joseph Trapp in 2 volumes. London: Allen and West, No. 15 Paternoster Row.)

All seven of these were republished by the Folio Society in London in 1968 with introductions for each novel written by Devendra Varma. Varma, in his book, The Gothic Flame suggests that Austen carefully selected the seven titles, which reflect different types of Gothic fiction, as well as reflecting the development of the genre. Since 2005, Valancourt Books has released new editions of the "horrids", the seventh and final being released in 2015.

=== The Mysteries of Udolpho ===
The most significant allusion, however, is to Ann Radcliffe's The Mysteries of Udolpho, as it is the Gothic novel most frequently mentioned within this text. Notably, Jane Austen sold the manuscript of Northanger Abbey to the same firm that published Radcliffe's novel in 1794.

This outside text is first mentioned in Chapter Six, when Isabella and Catherine discuss the mystery "behind the black veil", and further establish their friendship based on their similar interests in novel genre and their plans to continue reading other Gothic novels together. Austen further satirizes the novel through Catherine's stay at Northanger Abbey, believing that General Tilney has taken the role of Gothic novel villain.

Austen's discussion of Udolpho is also used to clearly separate Catherine and the Tilney siblings from John Thorpe, as when Catherine talks about the novel with him, he crudely responds that he "never reads novels" but qualifies his statement by arguing he would only read a novel by Ann Radcliffe, who is the author of Udolpho. Here, Austen humorously categorizes Northanger Abbey's characters into two spheres: those who read novels, and those who do not. When Catherine and Henry Tilney later discuss reading novels, and Henry earnestly responds that he enjoys reading novels, and was especially titillated by Udolpho, the match between Catherine and Henry is implied as both smart and fitting.

== Allusions to Northanger Abbey ==
A passage from the novel appears as the preface of Ian McEwan's Atonement, thus likening the naive mistakes of Austen's Catherine Morland to those of his own character Briony Tallis, who is in a similar position: both characters have very over-active imaginations, which lead to misconceptions that cause distress in the lives of people around them. Both treat their own lives like those of heroines in fantastical works of fiction, with Miss Morland likening herself to a character in a Gothic novel and young Briony Tallis writing her own melodramatic stories and plays with central characters such as "spontaneous Arabella" based on herself.

Richard Adams quotes a portion of the novel's last sentence for the epigraph to Chapter 50 in his Watership Down; the reference to the General is felicitous as the villain in Watership Down is also a general.

Jasper Fforde, in his alternative history comic fantasy novel First Among Sequels, refers to Northanger Abbey as being under maintenance and "should be ready on time as long as Catherine stops attempting to have the book 'Gothicized'." It appears again as the prize in a reality program, based on the lives of the Bennets from Pride and Prejudice.

== Adaptations ==
=== Film, TV or theatrical adaptations ===
- Spanish television TVE loosely adapted the story as La abadía de Northanger in 1968. It starred Lola Herrera as Catalina (Catherine) Morland, Alicia Hermida as Isabela Thorpe, and Pepe Martín as Henry Tilney.
- The A&E Network and the BBC released the television adaptation Northanger Abbey in 1987.
- An adaptation of Northanger Abbey with screenplay by Andrew Davies, was shown on ITV on 25 March 2007 as part of their "Jane Austen Season". This adaptation aired on PBS in the United States as part of the "Complete Jane Austen" on Masterpiece Classic in January 2008. It stars Felicity Jones as Catherine Morland and JJ Feild as Henry Tilney.
- A stage adaptation of Northanger Abbey by Tim Luscombe (published by Nick Hern Books ISBN 9781854598370), was produced by Salisbury Playhouse in 2009. It was revived in Chicago in 2013 at the Remy Bumppo Theatre.
- A theatrical adaptation by Michael Napier Brown was performed at the Royal Theatre in Northampton in 1998.
- The 1993 independent film Ruby in Paradise starring Ashley Judd was loosely inspired by Northanger Abbey. The protagonist, Ruby, reads the novel during the film.
- "Pup Fiction" (aired in 1997) – an episode of Wishbone featuring the plot and characters of Austen's Northanger Abbey. It stars Amy Acker as Catherine Morland and Soccer the Dog (voiced by Larry Brantley) as Henry Tilney.

=== Radio ===
- In 2005, BBC Radio 4 broadcast an adaptation with Emily Wachter as Catherine, Amanda Root as the narrator (described in the cast list as Austen herself), David Harewood as Henry Tilney, Julia McKenzie as Mrs Allen, Saskia Reeves as Eleanor Tilney, and Jenny Agutter as Mrs Thorpe.
- In 2016, BBC Radio 4 broadcast an adaptation by Hattie Naylor with Georgia Groome as Catherine. An adaptation of The Mysteries of Udolpho was broadcast at the same time, also adapted by Naylor, with the same cast.

=== Audio drama ===
- In July 2017, Audible released an original dramatisation of Northanger Abbey featuring Emma Thompson, Douglas Booth, Eleanor Tomlinson, Ella Purnell, Jeremy Irvine and Lily Cole.

=== Web series ===
- In 2015, a web series adaptation, Northbound, by Anya Steiner, was released on YouTube.
- In 2016, a web series adaptation, The Cate Morland Chronicles, was released on YouTube.

=== Literature ===
HarperCollins hired Scottish crime writer Val McDermid in 2012 to adapt Northanger Abbey for a modern audience, as a suspenseful teen thriller, the second rewrite in The Austen Project. McDermid said of the project, "At its heart it's a teen novel, and a satire – that's something which fits really well with contemporary fiction. And you can really feel a shiver of fear moving through it. I will be keeping the suspense – I know how to keep the reader on the edge of their seat. I think Jane Austen builds suspense well in a couple of places, but she squanders it, and she gets to the endgame too quickly. So I will be working on those things." The novel was published in 2014.

In 2011, Marvel published a graphic novel version of Northanger Abbey, adapted by Nancy Butler (writer), Janet K. Lee (artist) and Nick Filardi (colour artist).

The same year, author Jenni James published a teen version, Northanger Alibi, published by Inkberry Press, in which the main character's obsession for Stephenie Meyer's Twilight saga replaces Catherine's love for Regency gothic novels.

The Heiress of Northanger Abbey by Nancy Bilyeau, due to be published September 2026, follows up the main characters 22 years after the events of the original novel continuing themes like Gothic imagination, marriage and economic disparity while introducing new ones like Regency politics and motherhood.

== See also ==
- Reception history of Jane Austen
- Jane Austen
- Rachel Hunter
- Regency era
