= Clermont (novel) =

1798 gothic novel by Regina Maria Roche

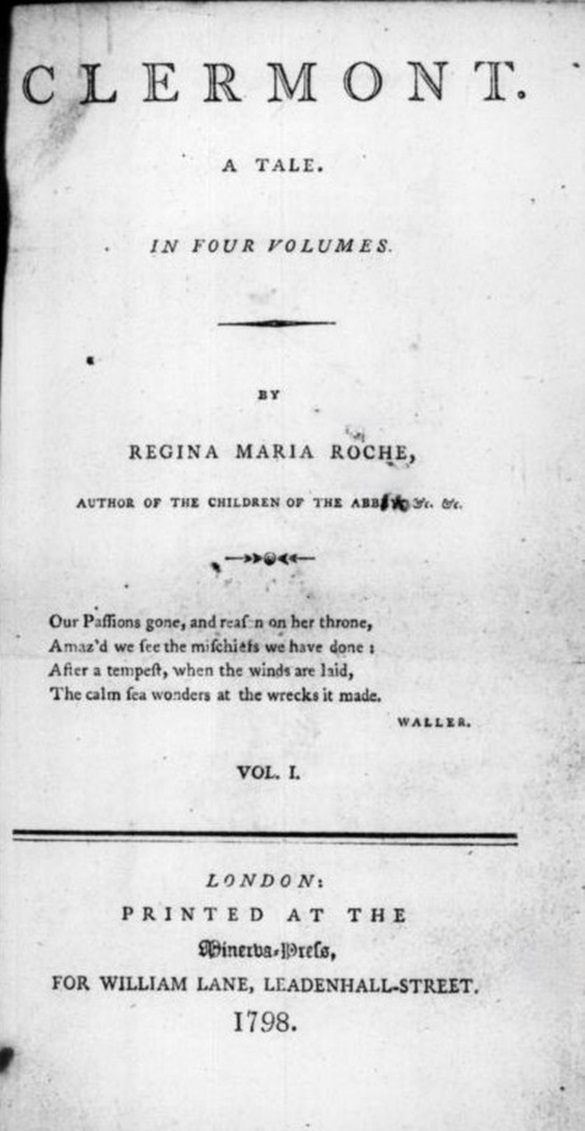
- First edition title page
- Author: Regina Maria Roche
- Language: English
- Genre: Gothic novel
- Publisher: Minerva Press
- Publication date: 4 July 1798
- Publication place: England
- Media type: Print (Hardcover)
- Pages: 394

Clermont is a gothic novel by Regina Maria Roche, first published in 1798 by Minerva Press. Considered as a narrative in the Gothic genre, the story follows the journey of its protagonist, Madeline Clermont, whose peace is disturbed by the mysteries surrounding the past. The novel encompasses many of the extremes of Gothic tropes, including foreboding spaces, secrets, horror, and supposed supernatural sightings. There are also elements of romance in the novel that literary critics suggest Roche utilised to ensure that the narrative results in an overall happy ending. Clermont also covers the concepts of female agency and virtue, with contemporary critics connoting its links to the Female Gothic genre more specifically.

Whilst the narrative has been received by critics as confusing and lacking as an art form – cited as an imitation of Roche’s counterpart Ann Radcliffe – Jane Austen’s mention of the novel in Northanger Abbey as one of the seven "horrid novels" roused further attention towards Clermont and Roche’s work, inviting readers and critics alike to reconsider its value as an eighteenth century Gothic text. Indeed, the novel is considered as one of "... the definitive text[s] of the Gothic novel craze during the eighteenth and nineteenth centuries", and interest in the narrative continues to broaden and extend to present-day contexts.

== Central Characters ==
- Madeline Clermont (the novel’s protagonist)
- Clermont (Madeline’s father)
- Henri de Sevignie (mysterious love interest)
- Countess de Merville (friend of Clermont and Madeline’s eventual patroness)
- Madame d’Alambert (Countess de Merville’s daughter and wife to D’Alembert’s son)
- D’Alamberts (father and son)

== Plot ==
Clermont tells the story of the beautiful Madeline, who lives in seclusion with her eponymous father until they are visited by a mysterious Countess from Clermont's past.

Madeline travels to complete her education, accompanied by the Countess. A series of assaults by shadowy foes cannot dissuade Madeline from unraveling the mystery of her father's past and pursuing her paramour, De Sevignie. Madeline uncovers the secret of her own noble origins and her virtue proves its strength through a series of trials and tribulations, resulting in reconciliation, harmony and the novel's essentially 'happy ending' .

== Setting ==
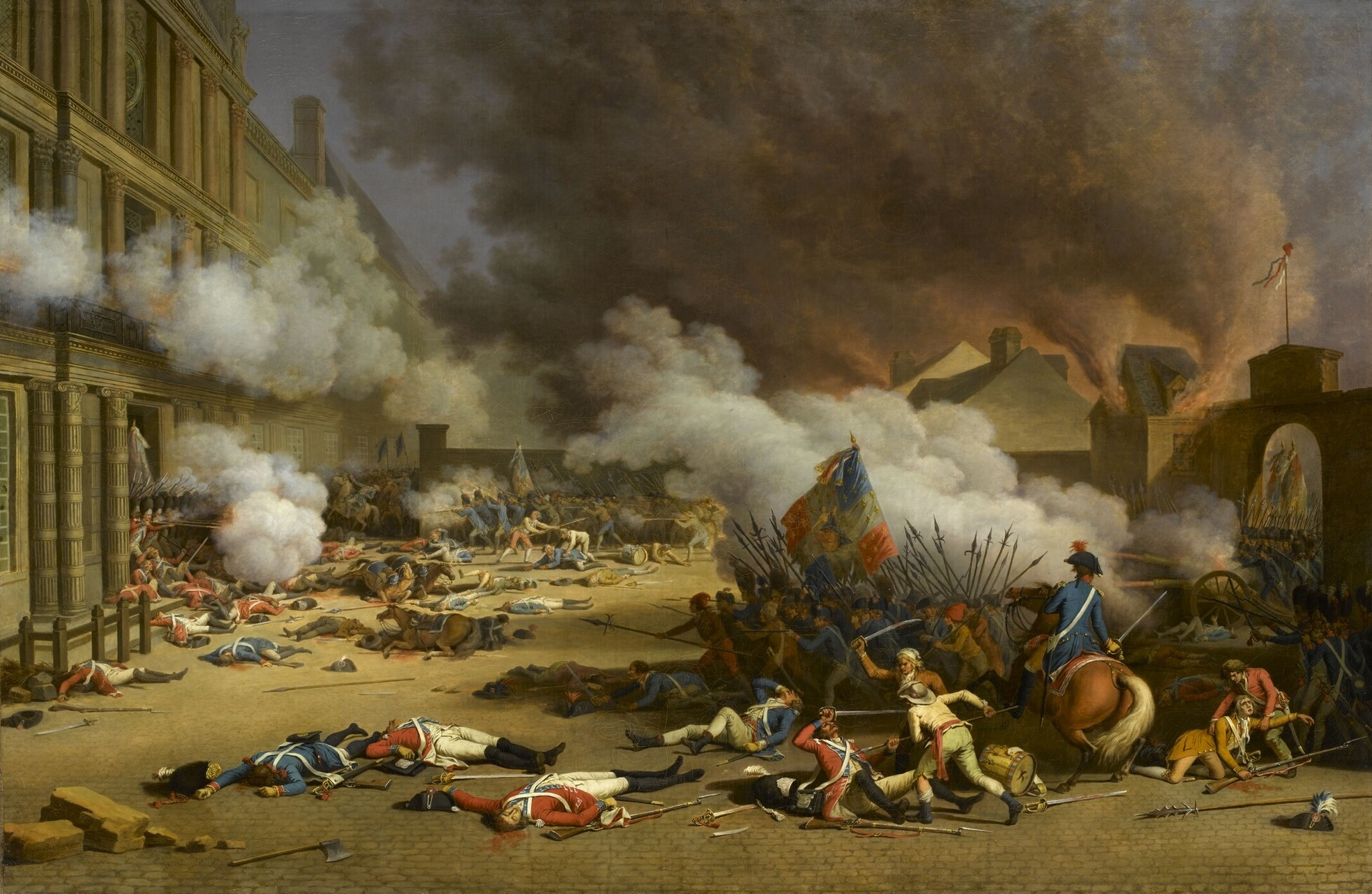
French Revolution (1789-1799), context of Clermont's publication

The narrative is set in rural France in what was defined at the time as “the declining years of the pre-Revolution ancien régime.” Bearing in mind these declining years and the political tension associated with the impending French Revolution (1789-1799), the context of the novel’s publication was surrounded by discord and social anxieties. Similarly, Madeline’s life within the narrative is constructed as “one of political exile.” Roche crucially demonstrated the differences between the idyllic and the chaotic in Madeline’s journey as the plot progresses. For example, Madeline’s home with her father is portrayed as “an idyllic pastoral home” and a “peaceful and lovely retreat from the dangerous outside world” which is a stark contrast to the bleak and stormy-weathered setting of the narrative, further compounded by the figurative gloom of the physical spaces of the chateaus and ruins within the story. Simultaneously, Madeline as a character is also a contrast to the characters that surround her; depicted by Roche as a true Gothic heroine, gracious and virtuous, akin to a “desert rose”. All the while, she is surrounded by characters who are often shown in the narrative as possessing sinister intentions or seemingly having something to hide. The setting appears unassuming at first, which further enhances the “uniform sombreness” with “sempiternal nocturnal bleakness” in other spaces within the text, a sort of foreshadowing of the looming storms and horrors expected up ahead as the story progresses.

== Major Themes ==
=== Horror and the Macabre ===
Clermont focuses primarily on the ‘shock factor’ to excite its readers, honing in on the horrific and horrible more than its literary counterparts. Roche portrayed the macabre and the morbid in Clermont with disturbing and horrific events. The Countess de Merville’s death, for example, is described in explicit terms in the narrative for the reader, and Madeline happens upon her “bludgeoned and bleeding body.” Both the reader and the protagonist are subject to the blatant shock and trauma through direct exposure to horrific incidents as they occur within the text. However, the novel stays true to much of the literary Gothic tradition, with inferences made regarding supernatural sightings within the novel, including the “cries and groans coming from the room of Clermont’s supposedly dead brother, which seem to accuse Madeline’s father of the murder of his brother.” The novel conceals these ‘evils’ up until the latter parts of the novel, intending to “intensify the blinding joys” amid darkness. Much of Roche’s horror plotlines are considered by reviewers as “leaning [more] toward[s] melodrama and physical suffering.”

=== Female Autonomy and Morality ===
As the story’s heroine, Madeline undergoes moral and ethical challenges that threaten to shake her inherent sensibilities and faithfulness to both her family and to her moral values. For example, instances of terror trigger immediate fear when she hears the “sobs and groans coming from Philippe’s room” where she “sees an accusing hand pointing to her father from behind the tapestry.” In this, she is forced to consider what to think and how to align her feelings with her response when pondering the possibility that her father may be a murderer, should these supernatural foreshadowings be correct. Despite all this, Madeline composes her emotions sensibly, responding in a way that is logical and rational based on the circumstances afforded to her, coming away from the horrors while remaining true to Roche’s representation of a gracious and virtuous heroine. Madeline also remains true to her convictions when faced with the decision to marry love or for fortune. In this, instead of accepting that marriage is a predominantly financial consideration, scholars note that she chooses to consult her heart. Indeed, terror and horror challenge her responses, as well as her ability to maintain her moral virtues in the face of the unthinkable. Throughout all of this, Madeline was intended to be a 'faultless character', one whom readers would consider the epitome of perfection”, making her a quintessential Gothic heroine.

=== Romance ===
Romance is a core trope in Clermont and acts as one of the reconciling elements in the novel. Scholars further deem this as a conclusive technique, stating that the story “must end with a marriage (in this case, multiple marriages) for the ending to be deemed 'happy’.” During the eighteenth and nineteenth centuries, much of women’s autonomy and power were directly linked to favourable marriages. Therefore, such an ending would be retributive and relatable to its readership at the time. In the case of Clermont, Madeline and Henri de Sevignie are the central love story within the novel, and both must contend with their love and their desire for one another as it will “cause them to risk parental disapproval to be together.” The complications rest in the fact that de Sevignie’s familial background and history are mysterious and unknown, and therefore considered to be “ominous” and ultimately unfavourable by Madeline’s father, Clermont. Despite this disapproval, Madeline behaves “as if riveted to the spot by a magic spell" and although another suitor, D’Alembert, who eventually reveals himself to be villainous, threatens this union and creates discord and separation in the novel by imprisoning both Madeline and her father. However, as Roche intended with her ‘happy ending’, this is ultimately righted in the end through Madeline and de Sevignie’s union. It comes to light that de Sevignie was her cousin, which then renders this marriage favourable as it meant consolidating familial wealth and uniting fortunes. The narrative is neatly concluded with a “close kinship marriage” and approved by their respective families since, at the time, a marriage between cousins was considered “as a mature and sensible choice”.

The resulting marriages in the narrative eventually lead to the overall reconciliation and healing of relationships, restoring much of the familial order. Familial ties and much of the novel’s secret circumstances, once shrouded in mystery and conflict, are mostly clarified and restored, all to enable a ‘happy ending’. It has been suggested by critics that Roche intended to “[attempt] to illustrate [in Clermont’s life] how uncontrolled passions can lead to misery” further cementing the themes of morality and upholding what is right and true, even where romance and marriage are concerned.

=== Gender ===
Clermont’s characters are stereotypically in line with eighteenth-century gender stereotypes, leaning towards a patriarchal view of male and female roles. Madeline is described in the novel as being like that of a “desert rose, seemed born to waste her sweetness in obscurity”, a sort of damsel in distress but also starkly feminine, with “exquisite taste for drawing and music…with a voice which, though not strong, was inexpressibly sweet.” Her father is depicted in stronger, more masculine undertones; one who guards and protects her “against all refinements which could render her dissatisfied”. Male characters in the narrative possess strong, and even horrifically violent and murderous tendencies, contrasting against the soft and tender nature of their female counterparts. Scholars suggest that this gendered approach reveals much of eighteenth-century gendered attitudes, adding that “true horror does not come from supernatural ghosts and demons but from individual men and the social structures they dominate.” In the same vein, in the latter part of the novel, Madeline and Clermont are ultimately rescued by Henri de Sevignie, the one whom Madeline will marry in the end. In line with much of what could be considered as ‘fairy tale endings’, it is the male character who rescues and saves, adding further to the notions of the gendered nature of the narrative.

== Genres ==
=== Gothic ===
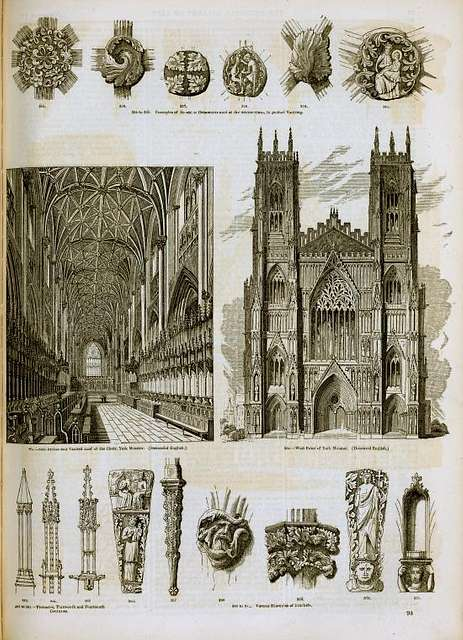
Example of English Gothic architecture and architectural ornamentation

Clermont performs the general gothic tropes, such as mysterious characters, eerie architecture and landscapes, and is considered by literary scholars as a novel “firmly rooted in the gothic tradition”. Roche paid particular focus to “manipulating the engines of terror and fear and [...] creating picturesque landscapes both to reinforce religious views and to further arouse expectation and suspense.” Clermont Mansion was one of the key spaces in which Roche demonstrated these horrors, with hallways and areas within the mansion appearing to be shrouded in mystery and suspicious incidents. Fratricide and threats to the family line are also key gothic tropes, which are demonstrated in the plot with de Sevignie’s mysterious personal history and background, and characters who seem to possess dark and ominous secrets. Clermont is overall highlighted for its shock value, horror and terror are incorporated throughout the plot, consistent with the Gothic genre.

=== Female Gothic ===
In addition to the traditional Gothic tropes that Clermont utilises, contemporary scholars link the novel particularly to the Female Gothic genre, citing its connections to an arduous journey into maturity as a woman in the eighteenth to nineteenth century. Whilst traditional gothic texts “locate horror [...] in supernatural monsters and spectacularized violence” we instead see the female gothic performing in a way that “women must learn about their subjugation in worlds dominated by men.” There is a level of trauma involved in the maturation process much akin to the societal realities of the time. Indeed, for the sake of depicting and portraying female maturation, “Madeline Clermont must abruptly leave their childhood homes and experience a series of seemingly supernatural terrors as well as real threats of sexual violence from lecherous aristocrats.” What is distinct about this genre and how it applies to Clermont and Madeline specifically is that it focuses on how women are terrorised in a manner distinct only to the female experience of that time and context.

Furthermore, what makes Clermont distinctly a Female Gothic novel is Roche’s focus on “the sentiments of her characters rather than the mystery.” Madeline is depicted as a resilient female protagonist, despite exposure to several traumatic incidents, such as witnessing the murder of Countess de Merville and being subjected to a great deal of male-dominated violence. The son-in-law of the Countess was indeed “overcome by that beauty” and “must escape his repeated threats to make her his mistress.” The inherent fear lies not only in the potential horrors of the supernatural and the spiritual but, instead, in the very real threats women face at the hands of men.

== Intertextuality: Clermont and Northanger Abbey ==
Clermont is known to be one of Roche’s lesser-known narratives, compared to her earlier successes with the critically acclaimed The Children of the Abbey, and was broadly considered by reviewers and critics alike as an overlooked literary work within the Gothic genre. One of its major criticisms is that it was considered artless and a mere imitation of the narratives of Anne Radcliffe, who, amongst female novelists of her time, was considered “the most prestigious living novelist”. As such, Jane Austen’s reference to Clermont in Northanger Abbey (published 20 December 1817) restored attention to Clermont in the literary community.

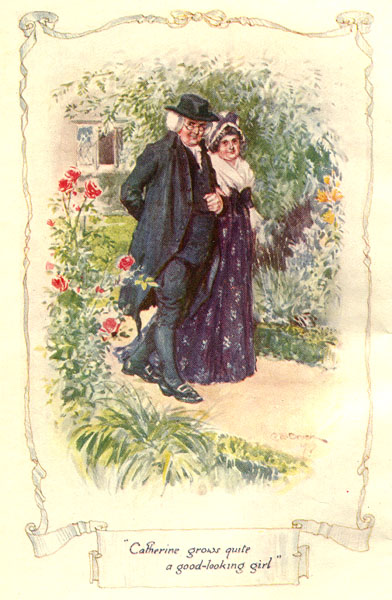
1907 edition of Northanger Abbey (Jane Austen's novel)

Clermont was one of the seven "horrid novels" recommended by the character Isabella Thorpe in Jane Austen's novel Northanger Abbey:

"Dear creature! How much I am obliged to you; and when you have finished Udolpho, we will read the Italian together; and I have made out a list of ten or twelve more of the same kind for you.

Have you, indeed! How glad I am! What are they all?

I will read you their names directly; here they are, in my pocketbook. Castle of Wolfenbach, Clermont, Mysterious Warnings, Necromancer of the Black Forest, Midnight Bell, Orphan of the Rhine, and Horrid Mysteries. Those will last us some time.

Yes, pretty well; but are they all horrid, are you sure they are all horrid?"

—Northanger Abbey, ch. 6

Though Clermont, as well as the other "horrid novels", were once thought to be the creations of Jane Austen's imagination, research in the first half of the 20th century by Michael Sadleir and Montague Summers confirmed that they did actually exist and stimulated renewed interest in the Gothic.Scholars surmise that the reference in Austen’s work was both intentional and purposeful, a means of value-placing and bringing attention to the intrinsic worth of a novel that has been otherwise bypassed and disregarded.

Austen’s reference to Clermont in Northanger Abbey signified, firstly, that Austen was familiar with and likely enjoyed Clermont, as well as with Roche’s literary works broadly. Secondly, Austen perhaps “discerned some inherent value in the novel” and considered it worth highlighting to her readers and the broader literary community by way of subtle acknowledgment in her novel. Scholars even suggest that Austen, who was understood to be a voracious reader, was potentially positively influenced by Roche’s work, which resulted in some subtle references to Clermont being incorporated into Northanger Abbey. For instance, it is noted that Northanger Abbey’s protagonist is intentionally “diametrically opposed” in personality, right down to the physical attributes of the characters to their interest in literature. Austen is believed to have intentionally inverted and contrasted several features of her novel, such as the initials of the names of her protagonist, i.e., Catherine Morland, CM, as Austen’s heroine and Madeline Clermont, MC, as Roche’s heroine.

== Reception and Literary Comparisons ==
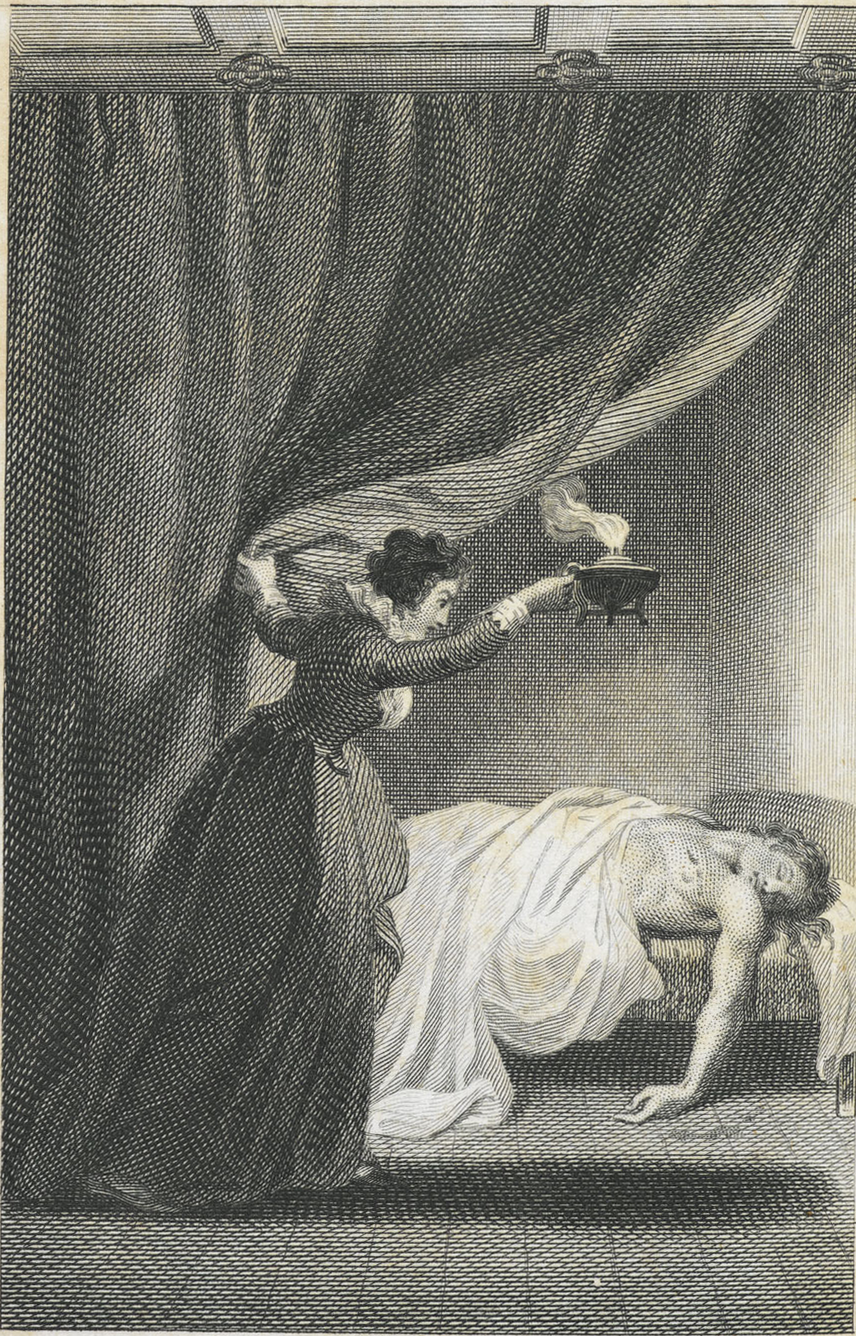
The Mysteries of Udolpho (1794), a literary work often compared to Clermont

Mysteries of Udolpho by Anne Radcliffe was often compared and contrasted with Clermont. Upon its publication in 1798, Clermont received mixed reviews, with the majority of these being negative. Whilst notably successful in employing the extreme of known gothic tropes such as mystery, terror, and gothic spaces, at the time of its publication, Clermont was “conspicuously ignored by reviewers” and, at a contemporary level, Roche’s authorship broadly placed her under minor gothic authors. The Critical Review referred to the narrative as having “little art, and great improbability”, whilst other reviewers in the late-eighteenth century considered the work as “hack fiction”. Additionally, Clermont was considered a “paltry imitation” compared to the works of Radcliffe’s Gothic romantic literature. Clermont is compared to The Mysteries of Udolpho, and Roche is critiqued as a “Radcliffe-imitator” and referred to as “Ireland’s Anne Radcliffe.”

Clermont has also received some positive attention, having been referred to as a “rhapsodical sensibility romance in its finest forms” and as “the definitive text of the Gothic novel craze during the eighteenth and nineteenth centuries.” Returning once more to Austen’s reference to Clermont in her work has significantly helped draw attention to this otherwise overlooked work of Roche, providing avenues for further interest and research into Clermont and Roche’s impact broadly in the literary community. Moreover, Clermont has been acknowledged to have cemented Roche as “one of the foremost novelists of the 1790s”, giving contemporary scholars further reason to believe that the novel is deserving of further research and attention.

== Sources ==
- Roche, Regina Maria. Clermont (Natalie Schroeder, ed.) Valancourt Books, 2005. ISBN 0976604841

== Editions ==
- 1968, London: Folio Press
- 2005, Valancourt Press ISBN 978-0-9766048-4-6
