= Eleanor Sleath =

English novelist (1770–1847)

- Born: Eleanor Carter
- Baptised: 15 October 1770
- Died: 1847
- Notable work: The Orphan of the Rhine, 1798; Who's the murderer?, 1802; The Bristol Heiress; or the Errors of Education, 1809; The Nocturnal Minstrel; or the Spirit of the woods, 1810; Pyrenean Banditti, 1811

Eleanor Sleath (15 October 1770, in Loughborough – 5 May 1847, in Sileby) was an English novelist, best known for her 1798 gothic novel, The Orphan of the Rhine, which was listed as one of the seven "horrid novels" by Jane Austen in her novel Northanger Abbey. In 1972 Arno Press reprinted The Nocturnal Minstrel (1810) with an introduction by Devendra Varma, and in 2017 Valancourt Books republished Who's the Murderer? (1802).

== Publications ==
- The Orphan of the Rhine, 1798
- Who's the Murderer?, 1802
- The Bristol Heiress; or the Errors of Education, 1809
- The Nocturnal Minstrel; or the Spirit of the Woods, 1810
- Pyrenean Banditti, 1811
- Glenowen; or The Fairy Palace; 1812

== Biography ==
For a long time, little was known of Sleath's life. She is mentioned in the Biographical Dictionary of Living Authors, published in 1816, accompanied by a list of her works. Michael Sadleir had speculated about her religion, and Devendra Varma posited that she might be the widow of a surgeon.

In 2012, Rebecca Czlapinski and Eric C. Wheeler published 'The Real Eleanor Sleath' in Studies in Gothic Fiction. They established that Eleanor Carter was born to Thomas and Elizabeth Carter. She was the youngest of their five children. She married Joseph Barnabus Sleath, a surgeon and apothecary, in September 1792 and moved to Nuneaton. Eleanor gave birth to a son also named Joseph Barnabus soon after her marriage, but in 1794 this son died. Four weeks later, Eleanor's husband died, leaving her in significant debt. In November 1794, she returned to her family home in Leicester to care for her elderly mother.

During the time between Sleath's return to Leicester and the publication of her first novel, little is known about her life. She appears to have associated with Susanna Watts and other literary-minded neighbours. Sleath moved to a more rural home with her family in 1801. In 1807, Ann Dudley became suspicious that Sleath was too close with her husband, the Reverend John Dudley, after Sleath's sister-in-law Elizabeth made a sarcastic comment. After controversy, gossip, and legal threats, the Dudleys moved away from the area (and later separated in 1811), and Sleath had a period of productivity during which she wrote several books.

In 1813, Sleath's brother and mother died, and she moved to Loughborough. Ann Dudley died in 1823, and John Dudley and Sleath married on 1 April 1823 and settled in Sileby. Eleanor died of liver disease on 5 May 1847.
