= Francis Lathom =

British novelist and playwright

Francis Lathom (14 July 1774 – 19 May 1832) was a British gothic novelist and playwright. Most of his novels were out of print throughout the 20th century, but some have since been rediscovered and republished by Valancourt Books. His best known novel, The Midnight Bell (1798), is notable for being one of the seven "horrid novels" mentioned by Jane Austen in her novel Northanger Abbey.

== Biography ==
Francis Lathom was born on 14 July 1774, in Rotterdam, Netherlands, where his father, Henry, conducted business for the East India Company and returning to England around 1777, settling near Norwich. He joined the Norwich Stock Company, a stock theatre company, in 1791 and began his literary career.

Lathom was a precocious writer, beginning to write plays before he had turned eighteen. His first play, All in a Bustle, was produced on the Norwich stage at the Theatre Royal Norwich in 1795; he would go on to write six other plays, including The Dash of the Day (1800), which went into three Norwich editions as well as a reprint published in Dublin.

Lathom's first novel, The Castle of Ollada (1795) was published in two volumes, anonymously, by William Lane's Minerva Press. This work, like most of Lathom's later Gothic novels, owed much to the earlier works of such writers as Horace Walpole and Ann Radcliffe. Although Lathom would occasionally employ bloody and horrific scenes reminiscent of M. G. Lewis, he typically followed Radcliffe's method of the "explained supernatural."

His next novel, The Midnight Bell (1798), is his most famous, not only because it is his best Gothic novel, but more significantly because Jane Austen lists it as one of "the horrid novels" in her Northanger Abbey. Lathom would go on to publish many more Gothic novels, all with sensational titles such as Astonishment!!!, The Fatal Vow, The Unknown, and The Impenetrable Secret, Find it Out!

But Lathom was not only a Gothic novelist: about half his works are works of contemporary satire or attempts at fiction in the mode of Walter Scott. Montague Summers called Lathom's Men and Manners (1799) his masterpiece and worthy of Dickens. Very Strange, But Very True! (1803), despite its enticing title, is not a Gothic novel, but a rollicking farce which still retains much of its humour after two centuries.

Lathom can be cited for two important achievements as a novelist. First, he was one of the first writers of historical fiction, with historical romances such as The Mysterious Freebooter; or, The Days of Queen Bess (1806), a novel which blends fact and fiction regarding Queen Elizabeth, predating the better known historical novels of Scott. Secondly, Lathom may be considered among the first gay writers. His Gothic novels often deal, albeit in a muted fashion, with subversive sexuality; his later works, including the novella The One-Pound Note (1820) and the novel Live and Learn, deal in a more surprisingly obvious way with the subject of mutual love between two men. Many of his novels attack infidelity however and champion a moral attitude to family affairs.

Little is known of Lathom's personal life. In 1797 he married Diana Ganning, daughter of a wealthy Norfolk lawyer, and the pair had four children, three of which survived, a baby boy dying in infancy. However, despite Lathom's burgeoning literary career and his growing family, some unknown cause led him to leave Norwich in 1810 and end his literary career. Summers has speculated this is related to Lathom's homosexuality, but there is no evidence one way or the other. He did separate from his wife shortly after this however and was given two thousand pounds a year in his father's will on condition that he break all ties with his children. His wife was awarded sole guardianship over the children in 1815 and the children were later renamed with their mother's maiden name. Lathom appears to have travelled extensively, visiting New York and Philadelphia and attempting to publish two novels in 1820. He also travelled in France and Italy, eventually settling in rural Scotland with the Rennie family, where he died in Aberdeenshire in 1832. He was buried under the name of 'Mr James Francis' in a plot in Fyvie churchyard belonging to the Rennie family.

== Bibliography ==
- The Castle of Ollada (1795)
- All in a Bustle: a Comedy in Five Acts (1795)
- The Midnight Bell (1798)
- Men and Manners: a Novel (1799)
- Mystery: a Novel (1800)
- Holiday time; or, The School Boy's Frolic (1800)
- Curiosity: a Comedy in Three Acts (1800)
- The Dash of the Day: a Comedy in Five Acts (1800)
- Astonishment!!! A Romance of a Century Ago (1802)
- Very Strange, But Very True! (1803)
- The Impenetrable Secret, Find it Out! (1805)
- The Mysterious Freebooter; or, The Days of Queen Bess (1806)
- The Fatal Vow; or, St. Michael's Monastery (1807)
- Human Beings: a Novel (1807)
- The Unknown; or, The Northern Gallery (1808)
- The Romance of the Hebrides; or, Wonders Never Cease! (1809)
- London; or, Truth Without Treason (1809)
- Italian Mysteries; or, More Secrets Than One (1820)
- The One-Pound Note and Other Tales (1820)
- Puzzled and Pleased; or, The Two Old Soldiers; and other tales (1822)
- Live and Learn; or, The First John Brown, his Friends, Enemies and Acquaintances, in Town and Country: a novel. (1823)
- The Polish Bandit; or, Who is my Bride? (1824)
- Young John Bull; or, Born Abroad and Bred at Home (1828)
- Fashionable Mysteries; or, The Rival Duchesses; and other tales (1829)
- Mystic Events; or, The Vision of the Tapestry: A Romantic Legend of the Days of Anne Boleyn (1830)

== See also ==
- List of Minerva Press authors
- Minerva Press
