= Regina Maria Roche =

Irish novelist (1764–1845)

Regina Maria Roche (1764 – 17 March 1845) was an Irish Gothic novelist, best known for The Children of the Abbey (1796) and Clermont (1798). Encouraged by the success of the pioneering Ann Radcliffe, she became a bestselling author in her own time. The popularity of her third novel, The Children of the Abbey, rivalled that of Ann Radcliffe's The Mysteries of Udolpho, and was mentioned in Jane Austen's novel Emma.

== Life ==
She was born Regina Maria Dalton in Waterford, Ireland in 1764. Her father, Blundel Dalton, was a captain in the British 40th Regiment. Her family moved to Dublin. After marrying Ambrose Roche in 1794, she moved to England.

Her first two novels were published under her maiden name, before the success of The Children of the Abbey and Clermont. Both were translated into French and Spanish and went through several editions. However, after her fifth novel, The Nocturnal Visit, appeared in 1800, Roche suffered financial difficulties, having fallen afoul of a duplicitous solicitor. She did not write again until 1807, when she received aid from the Royal Literary Fund. She then wrote 11 more novels, most of them set in rural Ireland. None of these matched her earlier successes. After her husband's death in 1829, she returned to Waterford.

After bouts of depression, Roche died in relative obscurity in her native town at the age of 81. The Gentleman's Magazine obituary calls her a "distinguished writer [who] had retired from the world and the world had forgotten her. But many young hearts, now old must remember the effect upon them of her graceful and touching compositions."

== Popularity ==
The Children of the Abbey, a sentimental Gothic romance, was one of the most popular novels of the 1790s. Her Clermont was Roche's only full attempt at writing a truly Gothic novel. It is decidedly darker in tone than anything else she wrote.

Both novels went through several editions and were translated into French and Spanish. Clermont was one of the Northanger Horrid Novels satirised by Jane Austen in her novel Northanger Abbey.

== Bibliography ==
- The Vicar of Lansdowne: or, Country Quarters, 1789
- The Maid of the Hamlet. A Tale, 1793
- The Children of the Abbey: a Tale, 1796
- Clermont: a Tale, 1798
- Nocturnal Visit: a Tale, 1800
- Alvondown Vicarage, 1807
- The Discarded Son: or, Haunt of the Banditti; a Tale, 1807
- The Houses of Osma and Almeria: or, Convent of St. Ildefonso; a Tale, 1810
- The Monastery of St. Columb: or, The Atonement; a Novel, 1814
- Trecothick Bower: or, The Lady of the West Country; a Tale, 1814
- The Munster Cottage Boy: a Tale, 1820
- Bridal of Dunamore and Lost and Won. Two Tales, 1823
- The Tradition of the Castle: or, Scenes in the Emerald Isle, 1824
- The Castle Chapel: a Romantic Tale, 1825
- Contrast, 1828
- The Nun's Picture, 1834
