= Eliza Parsons =

English novelist (1739–1811)

Eliza Parsons (née Phelp) (1739 – 5 February 1811) was an English Gothic novelist, best known for The Castle of Wolfenbach (1793) and The Mysterious Warning (1796). These are two of the seven Gothic titles recommended as reading by a character in Jane Austen's novel Northanger Abbey.

== Life ==
The life of Eliza Parsons has been subject to much speculation, but most researchers agree she was born in 1739. Parsons's baptismal certificate is dated 4 April 1739. Eliza was born in Plymouth, Devon, as the only daughter of John Phelp, a wine merchant, and his wife Roberta Phelp. She spent her childhood in a prosperous household and became well educated for a young woman in the 18th century. At about 21 years old, Eliza married a turpentine distiller, James Parsons, from the nearby town of Stonehouse, on 24 March 1760. Together they had three sons and five daughters.

About 1778–1779, the family moved to a suburb in London, when Parsons's turpentine business saw a decline as an indirect result of the American War of Independence. Mr Parsons invested his remaining money in his dwindling turpentine trade, and for about three years, the family's standard of living returned to the pre-American Revolution level. In 1782, however, a devastating fire broke out in one of the warehouses, spread quickly, and destroyed everything Mr Parsons owned. He then took a position in the Lord Chamberlain's office.

Several months before the warehouse fire, the Parsons's eldest son had died in Jamaica, immediately after his promotion to captain of the Royal Marines. Domestic bereavement coupled with the reverses in his business fortunes compounded with deteriorating health, and he suffered a paralysing stroke. He lived for three more years until he suffered a second, fatal stroke in 1797. Eliza's second oldest son also died in the military. In 1803, one of her daughters died, and in 1804 so did her youngest son.

Left alone with a family to provide for, Eliza began to write novels to support them. Over a career spanning 1790 and 1807, she wrote 19 novels and one play, contained in a total of 60 volumes. Nonetheless, she was perpetually short of money. Between 1793 and 1803 she received 45 guineas from the Royal Literary Fund and also worked at the Royal Wardrobe. She died on 5 February 1811 at the age of 72 in Leytonstone in Essex, survived by four married daughters.

== Female Gothic writing ==
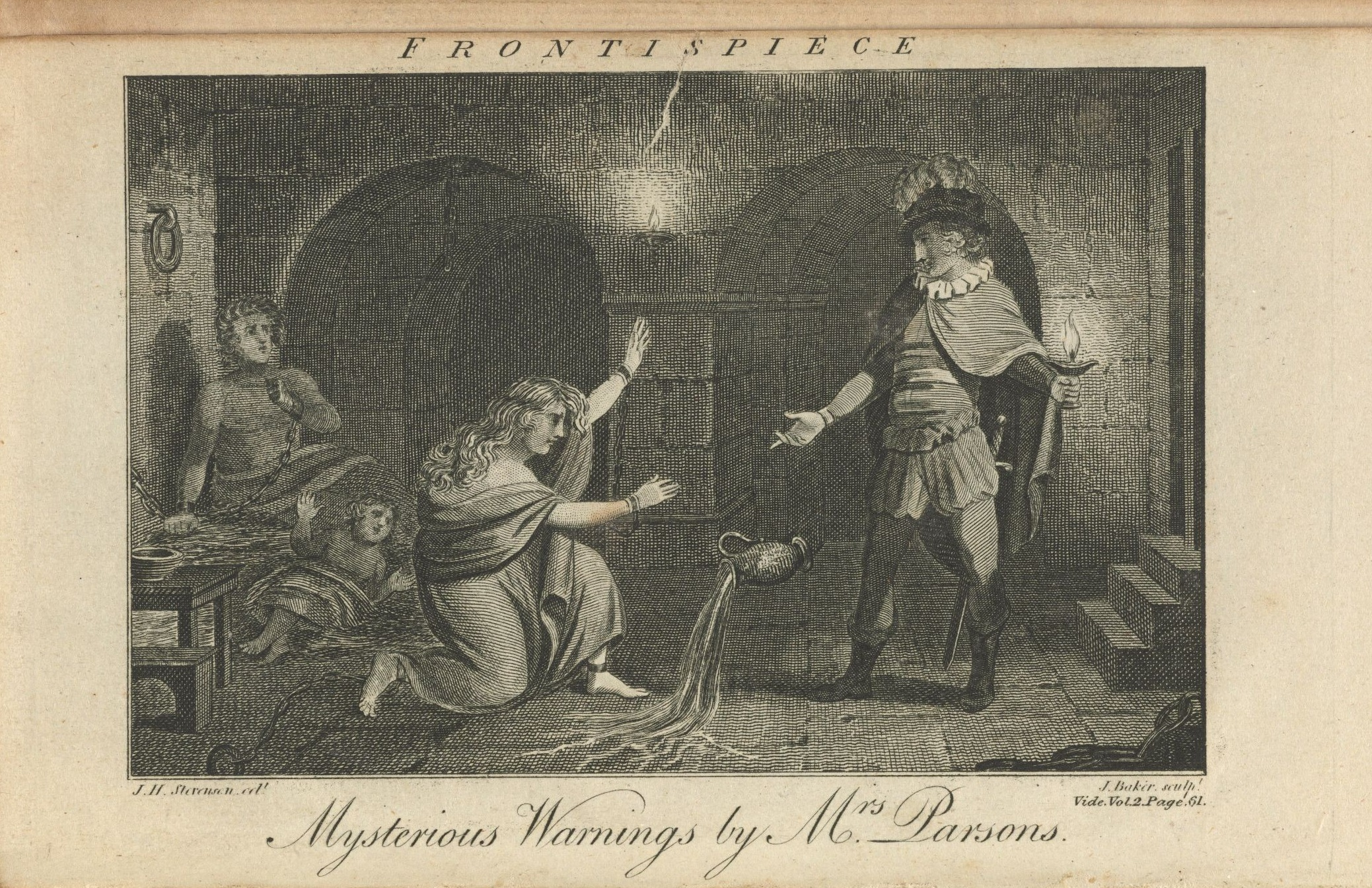
Frontispiece to The Mysterious Warning, 1796

Parsons turned to Gothic writing as a genre that was highly popular at the time. Critics often claimed her works were ill-written and disorganised. Parsons was a deeply religious Protestant, who believed in the good being rewarded and the wicked punished, which shows through in her works. Her first novel, The History of Miss Meredith, appeared in 1790, the year of her husband's death. The better-known The Castle of Wolfenbach followed in 1793, in a period when opinion in England and France was starting to turn away from arranged marriages. The Castle of Wolfenbach portrays this idea, along with belief in a strong patriarchal family and respect for the middle class rather than aristocracy. Other novels of hers include Women as They Are (1797) and The Valley of Saint Gotthard (1799). Parsons shows female Gothic-writing characteristics by having a heroine trick her way into an inheritance while pretending to be vulnerable and innocent.

Two of Parsons's novels, The Castle of Wolfenbach and The Mysterious Warning (1796), feature among the seven horrid romances that Catherine Morland recommends to Isabella Thorpe in Chapter 6 of Jane Austen's Northanger Abbey. These titles were thought to be fictitious until December 1912. Critics have said it is no accident that Ann Radcliffe's works were not named and two of Parsons's were. Many of Parsons's novels had prefaces that would seem to invite sympathy from the readers towards her unfortunate situation and to excuse her lack of talent. The Castle of Wolfenbach and The Mysterious Warning had happy endings that were too clumsy and convenient for critics.

== Works ==
- The History of Miss Meredith (1790, novel)
- Errors of Education (1791, novel)
- The Intrigues of a Morning; or an Hour in Paris (1792, play)
- Ellen and Julia (1793, novel)
- Woman as She Should Be (1793, novel)
- Anecdotes of Two Well-Known Families (1793, novel)
- The Castle of Wolfenbach (1793, novel).
- Lucy (1794, novel)
- The Voluntary Exile (1795, novel)
- Women as they Are (1796, novel)*
- The Mysterious Warning (1796, novel)
- The Girl of the Mountains (1797)*
- An Old Friend with a New Face (1797)*
- The Valley of Saint Gotthard (1799)*
- The Miser and His Family (1800)*
- Murray House (1801)*
- The Peasant of Ardenne Forest (1801, novel)*
- The Mysterious Visit (1802)*
- Love and Gratitude; or Traits of the Human Heart (1804, novel)*
- The Convict, or, Navy Lieutenant (1807)*

Two undated novels

- The Wise Ones Bubbled; or Lovers Triumphant
- Rosetta (as "A Lady")
