= The Children of the Abbey =

1796 novel by Regina Maria Roche

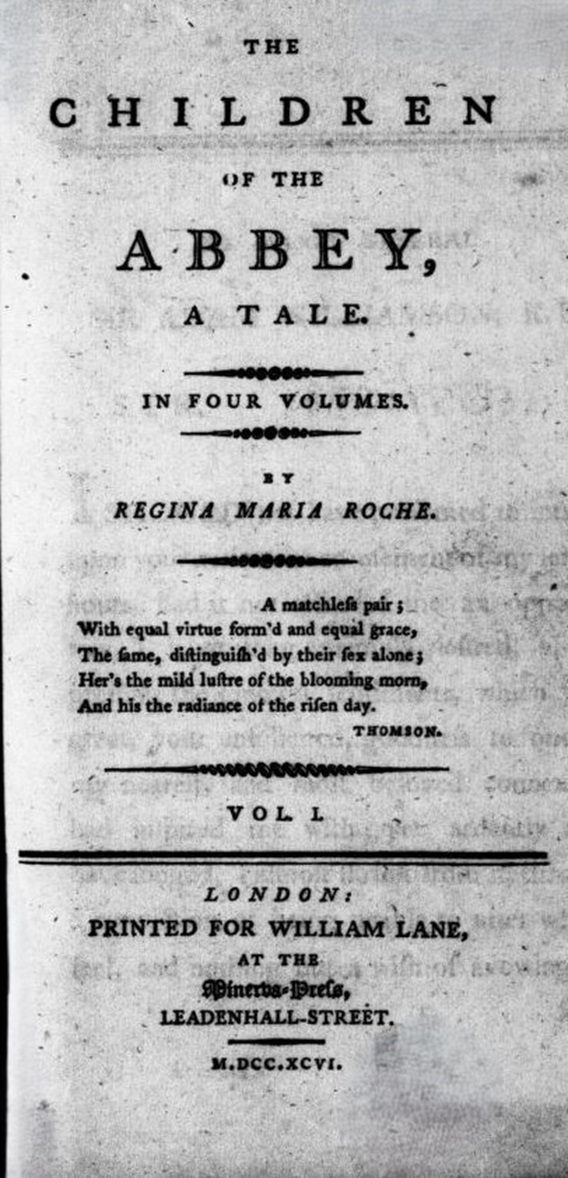
- First edition title page
- Author: Regina Maria Roche
- Language: English
- Genre: Gothic novel
- Publisher: Minerva Press
- Publication date: 6 July 1796
- Publication place: England
- Media type: Print (Hardcover)

The Children of the Abbey is a novel by the Irish romantic novelist Regina Maria Roche. It first appeared in 1796, in London in 4 volumes, and related the tale of Amanda and Oscar Fitzalan, two siblings robbed of their rightful inheritance by a forged will. The book contains many standard Gothic elements (old mansions, a haunted abbey) in the context of a sentimental novel. It was Roche's third and best-known novel, and was a major commercial success, remaining in print for most of the 19th century. The book is referenced in a number of other works, including Jane Austen's novel Emma, Emily Climbs by L. M. Montgomery, and Arabella by Georgette Heyer.

== History ==
The Children of the Abbey is a novel by the Irish romantic novelist Regina Maria Roche. It first appeared in 1796, in London in 4 volumes, and related the tale of Amanda and Oscar Fitzalan, two siblings robbed of their rightful inheritance by a forged will. The book contains many standard Gothic elements (old mansions, a haunted abbey) in the context of a sentimental novel.

The Children of the Abbey was Roche's third novel, it was a major commercial success, remaining in print for most of the 19th century. Such was the popularity of the novel, it reached a tenth edition by 1825. Scholars have since disagreed over whether the novel can be considered as pro-Catholic or not.

== In popular culture ==
The Children of the Abbey was mentioned in Jane Austen's popular novel Emma, in Emily Climbs by L. M. Montgomery, and in 'Arabella' by Georgette Heyer. It is also referenced in the artículo costumbrista "El casarse pronto y mal" by the Spanish Romantic Mariano José de Larra, 1832. American essayist and Unitarian divine Samuel McChord Crothers portrayed The Children of the Abbey as having given rise to "a regiment of Amandas named after the best seller of the day" around the year 1800.
