= The Orphan of the Rhine =

1798 novel by Eleanor Sleath

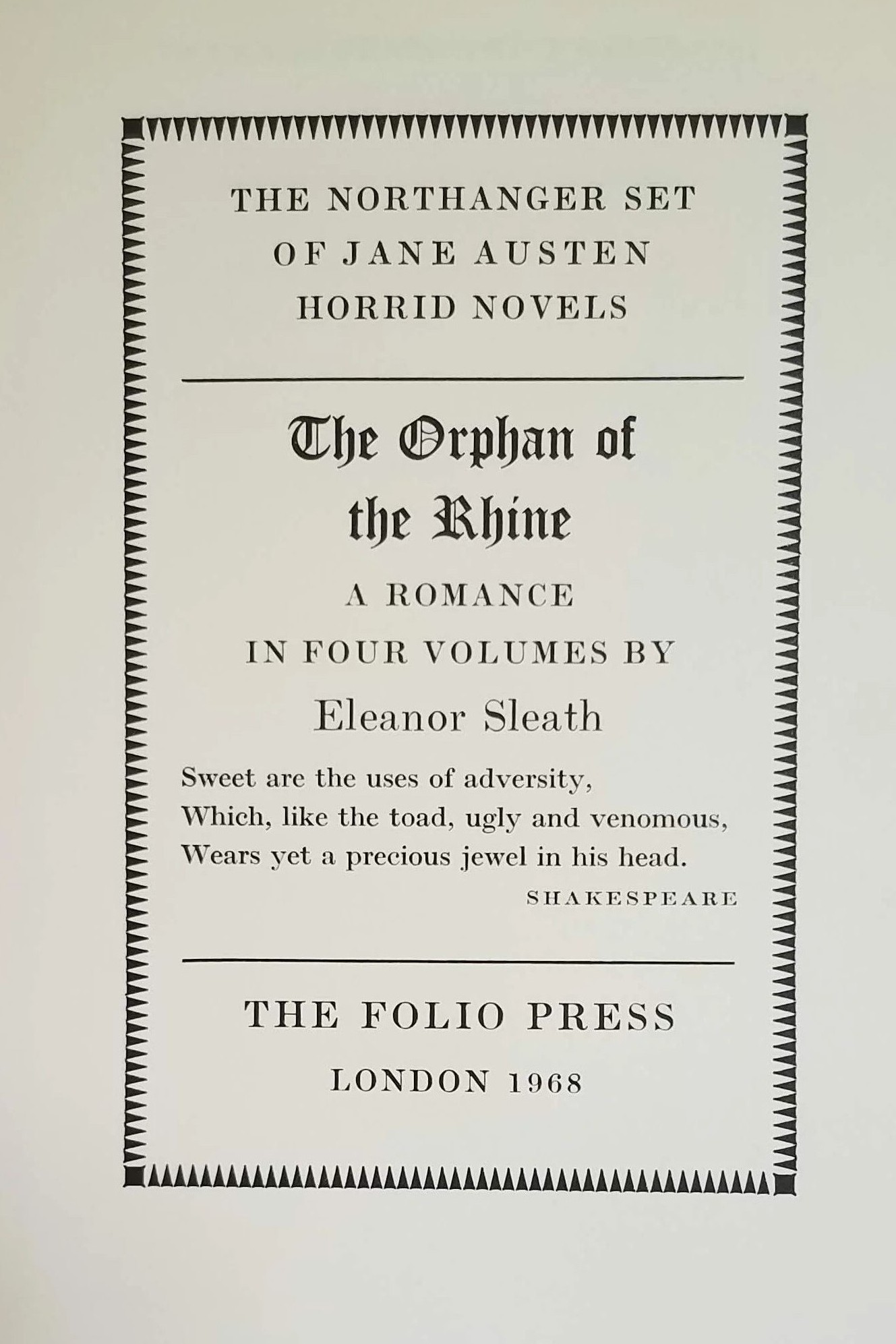
- Title page for 1968 Folio Press reprint
- Author: Eleanor Sleath
- Language: English
- Genre: Gothic fiction
- Publisher: Minerva Press
- Publication date: November 1798
- Publication place: United Kingdom
- Media type: Print (Hardback & Paperback)
- Pages: c. 200 pp

The Orphan of the Rhine is a gothic novel by Eleanor Sleath, listed as one of the seven "horrid novels" by Jane Austen in her novel Northanger Abbey.

Subtitled "A Romance" it was published in four volumes by the sensationalist Minerva Press in 1798. It was part of a brief but popular vogue of German tales, a fashion criticized in the Critical Review of June 1807: "So great is the rage for German tales, and German novels, that a cargo is no sooner imported than the booksellers' shops are filled with a multitude of translators, who seize with avidity and without discrimination, whatever they can lay their hands upon...[these novels are] trash...[and] worthless objects." Although most gothic novels took a resolutely anti-Roman Catholic stance, the author of this novel was herself a Catholic.

== Summary ==
The novel tells the tale of Julie de Rubine, a noble orphan, who after the death of her parents moved from France to Turin, to live with her wealthy aunt Madame Laronne. Before her death Julie's mother made her swear that she would marry, if ever, only a Catholic. Julie faithfully promised to do so. Her aunt led a fashionable life, so there were fetes, outings and balls to attend. Julie was admired for her beauty, and soon had a marriage proposal from Signor Vescolini, the only son of the Conte della Croisse. He is well off, but a Protestant, and his solicitations are distasteful to Julie. She rejects him twice, but her aunt insists, and forces her into this marriage. Julie's situation becomes even worse when the Marchese de Montferrat, rich and handsome, starts courting her. Madame Laronne hoped to marry the Marchese, because he paid her attention at the beginning of their acquaintance. When the aunt realises that he is after her niece, she presses the marriage with Vescolini even harder and keeps a close watch on Julie. The Marchese de Montferrat finds means to enter Julie's room and to arrange an elopement. He proposes to her a clandestine marriage, to be made public after a while. She agrees. Marchese marries her and keeps her in a hunting villa in the woods. He is tender and loving at first; but after Julie becomes pregnant, he cools down, and after a while tells her that the marriage was a sham, and she is, in fact, just his mistress. Julie gives birth to a son, Enrico, and leaves the Marchese for a little cottage on the borders of the Lake of Geneva. Her faithful servant Dorothée departs with her. After several years of residency in the cottage Julie receives a letter from the Marchese. He asks her to look after a little girl, four months old, and promises her a large house to live in, a quarterly allowance, servants and career help for their son, Enrico. If she refuses, he writes, he will "revenge on her." After some deliberation, Julie agrees. She, Enrico, Dorothée and the little nameless girl (the Marchesse left it to Julie to baptize her and to give her a name) depart to Germany, to a castle which the Marchese desired them to occupy, in the company of the Marchesse's sinister servant, Paoli. On their way to Germany they met a man called La Roque, who is left ill and dying in the inn, with only his daughter to attend him. Julie, moved by compassion, tries to cheer them up, sends for a physician, hires them a servant and leaves them a present of money. La Roque tells her to seek for them in a convent, him under the name of Father Francisco, and his daughter as sister Maria. Though Julie tried to locate them, she could not find them again, and met them only many years afterwards.

Upon arrival to the castle of Elfinbach, Julie finds it somewhat dilapidated. She assumes a new name, and starts calling herself Madame Chamont. She concludes that the girl left in her care must be a daughter of the Marchese and a woman called Di Capigna, a daughter of a merchant and her successor. The Marchese seduced her, but left her to marry a woman of large fortune and high rank. Di Capigna's father died from grief, and she herself disappeared, no one knows to where. Julie christens the child Laurette.

To increase his wealth even more the Marchese de Montferrat is rumoured to hire assassins who killed Conte della Caro, his relative, whose heir he was. The wife of the Conte died after giving birth to a daughter, and the daughter died with her mother, so the Marchese inherited the vast property of della Caro. He is immensely rich now. Julie raises up the children, teaching them classics, languages, music, and appreciation of nature and involves them in charitable works. A grown-up Enrico departs to join the army - the Marchese fulfilled his promise. Julie lives quietly, visiting the neighbouring convent, where she discovers, by chance, Di Capigna, who confesses her identity when dying, and assures Julie that she never had a daughter. Rambling in the woods, Julie stumbles upon a tower, enters to see what is inside and hears Paoli, threatening someone with death. She hides, to see him coming out from a tower and dropping a key. Julie sets the prisoner of the tower free - and it's no other than La Roque!

He tells her his story: he is, in fact, the Conte della Croisse, father of Signor Vescolini. He tells her that his son was killed by instigation of the Marchese de Montferrat, and he himself and his daughter were running away from his vengeance, when they met Julie on the road. Since then his daughter has married a rich and high-born German nobleman; and he was living near his family when one day he was abducted by Paoli and two ruffians.

Julie helps him to escape. Unfortunately, she dropped her bracelet in the tower, and Paoli found it among the files she used to break della Croisse's chains. Paoli lures Julie to look over the ramparts in the evening, and has her kidnapped by banditti. No one has seen her since, and Laurette proceeds to live on her own in the castle.

Enrico arrives and proposes Laurette marriage, he is in love with her. Though she is in love with him, too, she can't agree, since he has no means to keep a family. She decides to continue under the protection of the Marchese de Montferrat until Enrico will earn an establishment, and to brave the dark rumours about the Marchese's sinister past.

A white monk approaches Laurette, gives her the portrait of her mother, and is trying to reveal her identity to her, when they are interrupted by Paoli. Paoli immediately sends her off to another German castle of de Montferrat, in the principality of Salzburg. The Marchese, tired and weary of Italy, moves there himself. He falls in love with Laurette and presses marriage on her. When she refuses, he decides to dispose of her: she overhears him and Paoli conspiring to kill her. She is whisked away secretly, and no one sees her again. Enrico, who received a small legacy from a friend, travels to Salzburg, only to find out his Laurette has disappeared. Enrico finds her by chance in a hunting villa, guarded by Masehero, Paoli's brother, and left to die from hunger in one of the rooms below. He liberates her, and is surprised by arrival of the Conte della Croisse. The Conte informs him that he killed Paoli, and that the latter confessed all his crimes and announced that Enrico's mother was a lawful wife of the Marchese de Montferrat. The Marchese, wanting to have a fling, asked Paoli to procure a fake priest to perform a fake marriage ceremony. Paoli, thinking that he might benefit from it in the future, produced a real priest, so the ceremony was valid, and Enrico is a lawful heir of the Marchese. Paoli kept it secret, to blackmail the Marchese, if the later ever decided to dispose of him. The Conte della Croisse found Enrico's mother, too, shut in one of the local convents, where they tried to force her to become a nun. The monk who approached Laurette is revealed to be her maternal grandfather, and she is the legitimate daughter and the rightful heiress of the Conte della Caro. The Marchese de Montferrat is forced to confess his crimes and dies. Enrico marries Laurette, and they all, his mother included, reside in the castle of Elfinbach, doing a lot for charity.

== Reception ==
According to the literary critic and bibliophile Michael Sadleir, in his survey of the Northanger Horrid Novels "The Orphan of the Rhine is a genuine product of the influence of Mrs Radcliffe. It contains sensibility with sensation, being more terrific than Clermont but more melodious and picturesque than the terror-novel pure and simple" (Sadleir 1944: 180).

== Editions ==
- 1968, London: Folio Press
- 2008, Dodo Press ISBN 978-1-4099-4809-4
- 2014, Valancourt Books. ISBN 978-1-941147-37-5
- 2023, Read & Co. ISBN 978-1-528722-82-7

== Reprint of the rare first edition ==
- As part of their reprints of the Jane Austen Northanger Horrid Novels series, in 2014 Valancourt Books brought back The Orphan of the Rhine in the only complete reprinting of the original, unabridged and unedited text. The edition contains a new introduction by Jane Austen scholar Ellen Moody.

== Bibliography ==
- Michael Sadleir (1944), Things Past
- Montague Summers (1938), The Gothic Quest: a History of the Gothic Novel
