= The Midnight Bell =

Gothic novel by Francis Lathom

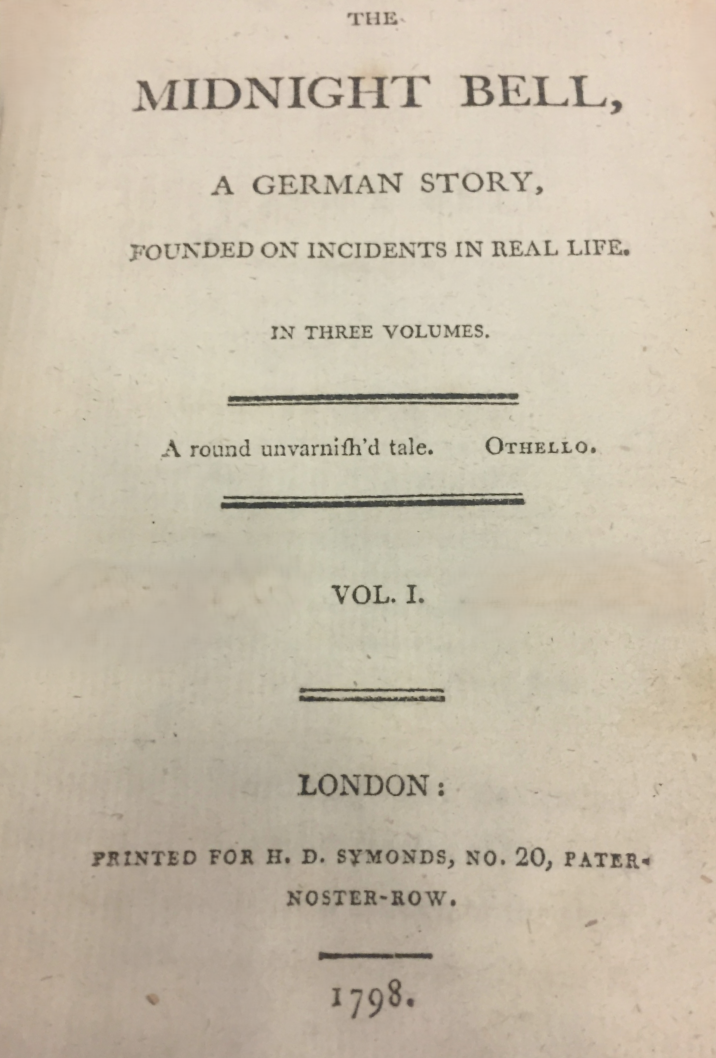
- First edition title page
- Author: Francis Lathom
- Language: English
- Genre: Gothic fiction
- Publication date: 21 July 1798
- Publication place: United Kingdom
- Media type: Print (Hardback & Paperback)
- Pages: c.200 pp

The Midnight Bell is a gothic novel by Francis Lathom. It was first published anonymously in 1798 and has, on occasion, been wrongly attributed to George Walker. It is notable for being one of the seven "horrid novels" mentioned by Jane Austen in her novel Northanger Abbey.

== Plot summary ==
Volume I

The story begins in Saxony, at Cohenburg Castle, with two adult brothers, Alphonsus and Frederic. Alphonsus is the elder and inherited the title of Count Cohenburg after the death of their father.

Frederic falls in love with a woman from Luxembourg, named Sophia, and marries her. Alphonsus observes his brother's happiness in marriage and seeks to replicate it. He selects a bride from the German court, Anna, and the two settle into a happy marriage. Anna and Alphonsus have a child, a boy also named Alphonsus. Meanwhile, Frederic and Sophia have three children, all of whom die in infancy, and Sophia dies giving birth to the third. In his grief Frederic departs Cohenburg Castle, returning only three times in the next eleven years. Frederic finally settles back at the castle when the young Alphonsus is 17 years old.

Some months later, Alphonsus, Count Cohenburg, is called away to the city on business. He dreads leaving his wife with Frederic, as he is concerned that they are having an affair. Alphonsus fails to return to Cohenburg Castle and Sophia is told that he is dead. Anna immediately blames Frederic for Alphonsus’s death and makes her son swear to avenge his father’s death. Days later, just after midnight, the young Alphonsus hears a scream from his mother’s room, which he assumes is an expression of her grief. Early the next morning Anna appears with bloody hands and tells Alphonsus that Frederic is innocent and compels Alphonsus to leave the castle, Frederic, and her behind and never return.

After his departure from Cohenburg castle, Alphonsus resolves to join the army. As he travels he begins to suspect his mother may have had an affair with Frederic and that together they planned the murder of the elder Alphonsus. While in the army, Alphonsus grows close to his commander, Arieno. Arieno recounts his life’s story to Alphonsus, describing his love for Camilla, a young woman who died from despair. owing to the machinations of Arieno’s eldest brother, Simon. A connection is made between Alphonsus and Arieno, as Simon’s daughter is revealed to have been in love with Frederic. Arieno dies in battle and Alphonsus is injured, causing him to leave the army.

Alphonsus travels to Bohemia, where he finds employment in a silver mine. There a young man tells the story of his family, who rented land from Count Cohenburg, Alphonsus’s father. He reveals that after the death of Count Cohenburg, his wife, Anna, supposedly committed suicide and her ghost now walks the halls of the castle and rings the castle bell at midnight. The young man also reveals that Frederic has left Cohenburg Castle, which is now deserted. Alphonsus determines to leave the mine and offers himself as a servant to Baron Kardsfelt, who was visiting the mine.

Baron Kardsfelt dies, and Alphonsus is taken in by a Catholic priest, Father Mathias. The two return to the convent of Saint Helena, where Alphonsus becomes responsible for ringing the bell for prayers. Alphonsus falls in love with Lauretta, a novice at the convent, and Father Mathias recounts her history. It is revealed that 17 years before, a young woman, also named Lauretta, came to the convent. Upon her arrival she revealed the details of her love for Frederic Cohenburg and her arranged marriage to Count Byroff. She described how Frederic and her continued to meet after her marriage, until count Byroff discovered their affection and stabbed Frederic out of jealousy. Believing Frederic to be dead, she fled to the convent, where she died from her grief, after giving birth to a child, the novice Lauretta.

Alphonsus informs Lauretta of the connection between their families and asks her to leave the convent with him. Lauretta agrees and the two are married by Father Mathias before they depart. The couple settle in a new home, which they rent from Baron Smaldart. The Baron’s nephew, Theodore, begins to lust after Lauretta, even though she is heavily pregnant. After the birth of the child, who only lives a few hours, Lauretta is increasingly upset by Theodore’s attentions. One night, the house is set on fire and Lauretta is abducted. Lauretta initially believes that Theodore is her abductor, but soon learns that her captors are a ruffian named Kroonzer and his companion Ralberg, under orders from Theodore. Lauretta is then taken to a ruined castle, where she is confined to a turret room for seven days until lightning strikes the turret and it collapses

Volume II

Only mildly injured, Lauretta seizes the chance to escape and walks all night until she meets a benign hermit. The hermit tends to Lauretta and informs her of the mysterious reputation of the castle in which she was imprisoned, and how it used to belong to the Byroff family, but has since been abandoned. The hermit proposes to deliver a letter to Alphonsus, via Baron Smaldart, to inform him of Lauretta’s location. To pass the time until Alphonsus arrives, the hermit tells her his life story. The hermit recounts how in his youth he was accused of murder. A man named Dulac had given him shelter after his horse was injured. Dulac’s house was full, so he offered to share his bed with the hermit. One morning Dulac failed to return from his morning walk and the hermit was accused of his murder, as blood was found in Dulac’s bed, resulting from the hermit’s nosebleed the night before. The hermit is arrested and made a slave for many years. 22 years after his initial arrest, the hermit encounters Dulac, who is now also a slave. Dulac informs the hermit that on the day of his supposed murder he had been abducted by thieves and sold into slavery. The two men are eventually freed and determine to travel back to France together. However, their ship is caught in a storm and Dulac drowns, ensuring that the hermit cannot clear his name.

The hermit eventually returned home, where he discovered his family had died in his absence, at which point he withdrew from society. A few days after hearing the hermit’s story Lauretta wakes one morning to find that the hermit has died.

Meanwhile, Alphonsus, having realised that Lauretta is missing goes to Baron Smaldart and reveals Theodore’s misconduct, accusing him of involvement in the abduction. The Baron, believing Alphonsus’s claims, resolves to confront Theodore, and provides Alphonsus with a horse to pursue Lauretta’s captors. During the confrontation Theodore denies his involvement in Lauretta’s abduction, but the baron is not convinced and confines Theodore to the house until Lauretta and Alphonsus are reunited. While Alphonsus is pursuing Lauretta, Theodore manages to escape his confinement. The next day, Alphonsus receives Lauretta’s letter and is overcome with joy at hearing of her safety. The baron travels to meet Lauretta, but by the time he arrives she has disappeared.

Lauretta, having been recaptured by Theodore and his men, is transported through a forest, where she hears some call her name “Lauretta Byroff”. As Theodore pursues the owner of the voice, Lauretta is escorted to a cavern by Ralberg, who reveals that he is Count Byroff, Lauretta’s father. Count Byroff tells Lauretta about his relationship with her mother, revealing that he had no knowledge of her affections for Frederic before the marriage and that, in attempting to kill Frederic, Count Byroff had accidentally killed the son of a Venetian Senator, causing him to flee the city and sign his property and wealth over to Count Arieno to prevent it from being confiscated. Count Byroff fled to Paris, where he was eventually arrested and sent to the Bastille, where he was imprisoned for many years and tortured. The arrival of Theodore and Kroonzer interrupts Count Byroff’s story, as they begin attacking him, causing Lauretta to flee and faint.

Volume III

When Lauretta awakes she is greeted by Alphonsus and informed that her father has killed Theodore and that Kroonzer has fled. Alphonsus, Lauretta, and Count Byroff decide to travel together, without returning to Baron Smaldart. Alphonsus resolves to return to Cohenburg and addresses the mysteries of the castle. As they travel, Count Byroff relates his escape from the Bastille with the help of a young servant. The two then travelled to Germany and joined a group of bandits, leading to Count Byroff’s involvement in Lauretta’s abduction.

On the journey to Cohenburg castle the group stops at an inn and encounters Jacques, the servant who had helped free Count Byroff from the Bastille. Jacques reveals that he left the bandits not long after Count Byroff did and has since been travelling to find the Count. The party continue to travel towards Cohenburg Castle, and Alphonsus parts from the group at an inn near the castle and continues the journey by himself. However, on finding the castle boarded up he returns to the inn and reunites with his companions. Alphonsus resolves to listen for the tolling of the bell at midnight to determine if the castle is inhabited. Accompanied by Jacques, Alphonsus hears the bell ring. Jacques alone returns to Lauretta and Count Byroff, and claims that Alphonsus is trapped in the castle by ghostly black figures. However, Alphonsus soon arrives back at the inn, distraught and frantic, and falls ill.

A friar from a nearby monastery treats Alphonsus. As Alphonsus begins to improve, Jacques escorts the friar back to the monastery. On his return, Jacques tells Count Byroff about a conversation he overheard at the monastery, causing the two to realise that the monks are responsible for ringing the bell, and that they were the black figures witnessed in the castle. With this new information, Jacques and Count Byroff resolve to question Alphonsus about the reasons for his distress. Alphonsus reveals that he saw his mother in the castle and fears that her ghost is haunting him for breaking his vow never to return to Cohenburg Castle. Alphonsus begs one of the friars, Father Nicholas, for forgiveness and reveals his identity as the heir to Cohenburg Castle. Father Nicholas reveals that Alphonsus’s mother, Anna, still lives, and recounts the events that took place at Cohenburg Castle before Alphonsus’s departure.

It is revealed that Alphonsus’s father, consumed with jealousy, faked his own death in an attempt to catch Frederic and Anna conducting an affair. The elder Alphonsus entered Anna’s bedchamber, pretending to be Frederic, and Anna, believing that the disguised Alphonsus intended to force himself on her, stabbed him in the heart. When dawn came, she saw that she had not killed Frederic, but her own husband, making herself the target of the young Alphonsus’s vow for revenge, causing her to send him away from her and the castle. At Anna’s request, Father Nicholas hid the details of the elder Alphonsus’s death, and spread word that Anna herself had died. Frederic secluded himself in a monastery, where he soon died. Father Nicholas explains that the tolling of the bell at midnight was intended keep visitors away from the castle by making it seem haunted, and to call holy men to Anna to assist with her prayers. The story ends with Anna departing the castle for a convent and Alphonsus, Lauretta, and Count Byroff taking up residence at Cohenburg Castle. Father Nicholas ensures that the church releases Alphonsus from his vow. Lauretta and Alphonsus live in domestic happiness with their children, whom Alphonsus instructs to avoid being suspicious of others.

== Characters ==
=== Main characters ===
- Alphonsus (1), Count Cohenburg – mild tempered and well educated, but prone to suspicion. He is the father of Alphonsus (2) and the husband of Anna. He fakes his death to confirm his suspicions of his wife’s affair, but ends up stabbed when she mistakes him for his brother, Frederic.
- Alphonsus (2) – handsome and clever. He is the son of Alphonsus (1) and Anna. He flees his home after the death of his father, only to return years later with his wife, Lauretta.
- Anna – affable and polite. Anna is the wife of Alphonsus (1) and mother of Alphonsus (2). She accidentally kills her husband.
- Frederic – passionate, handsome and elegant. Frederic is the younger brother of Alphonsus (1) and Anna’s rumoured lover.
- Lauretta – the beautiful wife of Alphonsus (2), and the daughter of Count Byroff. She is also the object of Theodore’s lust.
- Father Mathias – a priest at the convent of Saint Helena, who takes Alphonsus in and cares for Lauretta throughout her childhood.
- Theodore – a knight who lusts after Lauretta and orchestrates her abduction, he is the nephew of Baron Smaldart.
- Count Byroff – father of Lauretta, whom he abducts under Theodore’s command, while he is disguised as a bandit named Ralberg.
- The Hermit – falsely accused of murder and made a slave. Decades later he protects Lauretta and gives her shelter after her abduction.
- Jacques – helps free Count Byroff from the Bastille and accompanies Count Byroff, Lauretta, and Alphonsus to Cohenburg Castle.
- Father Nicholas – a priest entrusted with the history of the inhabitants of Cohenburg Castle, which he recounts to Alphonsus.

=== Minor characters ===
- Sophia – Frederic’s wife, who dies in childbirth.
- Arieno – Alphonsus’s army commander and Lauretta’s great-uncle.
- Baron Kardsfelt – takes Alphonsus into his service briefly, before dying.
- Kroonzer – one of the bandits who abducts Lauretta.
- Baron Smaldart – Alphonsus and Lauretta’s landlord and uncle of Theodore.
- Dulac – the hermit’s suspected murder victim, who was sold into slavery and died before he could return home.

== Themes ==
Suspicion is a significant theme in The Midnight Bell, as Count Cohenburg’s suspicion of his wife’s infidelity and Anna’s suspicion of Frederic’s desire for her are the direct causes of the murder that starts the book's plot. Additionally, the novel ends with Alphonsus warning his children of the dangers of suspicion.

Lathom explores ideas of inheritance, beyond any references to material wealth, as The Midnight Bell is concerned with children's inheritance of the sins of their parents.

David Putner wrote that the narrative is “driven by melancholy”, Alphonsus being the most prone to it, frequently falling ill, owing to the overwhelming nature of his emotions. Anna is also affected by melancholy.

Allen W. Grove stated that “the novel is constructing a sexual politics by no means restricted to the conventional, predictable marital ending”. The relationship between the hermit and his implied male lover is more domestic and affectionate in nature than other heterosexual relationships in the novel.

== Reception ==
The Midnight Bell has been subject to mixed reviews through its publication. The Critical Review in 1798 included a negative review of the novel. The reviewer stated that the author, or authors, of The Midnight Bell, did not “care how absurd and contradictory the story may be…provided they can make all plain and evident at the conclusion”. However, the reviewer concluded, they were unsuccessful in their attempt to draw the events of the novel to a satisfactory conclusion.

Michael Sadleir's review of The Midnight Bell stated that the novel failed to live up to its title, which was “almost of gothic masterpiece”. Sadleir concluded that The Midnight Bell was lacking in quality compared with Lathom’s other novels, particularly Men and Manners (1799). However, Sadleir did draw positive attention to the chapters focusing on the Bastille in The Midnight Bell, owing to their “realism”.

The Midnight Bell has also received some more favourable reviews; Susan Allen Ford, for example, writing for the Jane Austen Society of North America, described the “highly episodic and fast-paced” nature of the novel as a good choice for an evening’s read.

== Publication history ==
Cover for the 2007 Valancourt Books edition

The Midnight Bell was first published by H.D Symonds in 1798. It was published anonymously in three volumes, a format that was repeated when the novel was republished by J. Haly, M. Harris, and J. Connor in Cork in 1798. The Midnight Bell was published in America for the first time in 1799, by James Carey in Philadelphia, and a second UK edition was published by Minerva Press in 1825. A German translation of The Midnight Bell was published in 1800 by Erfurt, as Die Mitternachtsglocke. A French translation of the novel, as La cloche de minuit, was published in 1813. The Midnight Bell was republished by the Folio Press in 1968 as part of a collector’s set of the gothic novels mentioned in Northanger Abbey. Skoob Books published another edition of The Midnight Bell in 1989. Valancourt Books published the most recent edition of the novel in 2007, and a Kindle edition was released in 2011.

== Editions ==
- 1968, London: Folio Press
- 1989, Skoob Books ISBN 978-1-871438-30-7
- 2007, Valancourt Books ISBN 978-1-934555-12-5
