= Eighteenth-century Gothic novel =

Genre of fiction published 1764 – c.1820

The eighteenth-century Gothic novel is a genre of Gothic fiction published between 1764 and roughly 1820, which had the greatest period of popularity in the 1790s. These works originated the term "Gothic" to refer to stories which evoked the sentimental and supernatural qualities of medieval romance with the new genre of the novel. After 1820, the eighteenth-century Gothic novel receded in popularity, largely overtaken by the related genre of historical fiction as pioneered by Walter Scott. The eighteenth-century Gothic was also followed by new genres of Gothic fiction like the Victorian penny dreadful.

== Historical development ==
=== The rise of the Gothic ===
The first work to call itself "Gothic" was Horace Walpole's The Castle of Otranto (1764). Walpole's declared aim was to combine elements of the medieval romance, which he deemed too fanciful, and the modern novel, which he considered to be too confined to strict realism. Walpole's novel was popular but did not initially prompt many imitators. Beginning with Clara Reeve's The Old English Baron (1778), the 1780s saw more writers attempting the Gothic combination of supernatural plots with emotionally realistic characters.

=== 1790s Gothic boom ===
At the height of the Gothic's popularity in the 1790s, in England the genre was almost synonymous with Ann Radcliffe, whose works were highly anticipated and widely imitated. She has been called both "the Great Enchantress" and "Mother Radcliffe" due to her influence. She combined aspects of Walpole's Gothic romance with the traditions of the earlier sentimental novel. Radcliffe's defining narrative technique was the "explained supernatural," or, seemingly-magical events which turn out to have mundane explanations. Radcliffe's success attracted many imitators, and the 1790s were characterized by a boom in Gothic publications, especially through the Minerva Press publishing house. Radcliffe's works were often seen as the feminine and rational opposite of a more violently horrifying male Gothic associated with Matthew Lewis. Lewis's The Monk (1796) contrasted strongly with Radcliffe's bestselling The Mysteries of Udolpho (1794), and Radcliffe responded to Lewis in her final novel The Italian (1797). Lewis's The Monk was also seen as bringing the continental horror mode to England, drawing on the German Schauerroman.

==== German Schauerroman ====
The term Schauerroman is sometimes equated with the term "Gothic novel", but this is only partially true. Both genres are based on the terrifying side of the Middle Ages, and both frequently feature the same elements (castles, ghost, monster, etc.). However, Schauerroman's key elements are necromancy and secret societies and it is remarkably more pessimistic than the British Gothic novel. All those elements are the basis for Friedrich Schiller's unfinished novel The Ghost-Seer (1786–1789). The motive of secret societies is also present in Carl Grosse's Horrid Mysteries (1791–1794) and Christian August Vulpius' The History of Rinaldo Rinaldini (1798). Genres of Gespensterroman/Geisterroman ("ghost novel"), Räuberroman ("robber novel"), and Ritterroman (chivalric romance) also frequently share plot and motifs with the British "gothic novel". As its name suggests, the Räuberroman focuses on the life and deeds of outlaws, influenced by Friedrich Schiller's drama The Robbers (1781). Heinrich Zschokke's Abällino, der grosse Bandit (1793) was translated into English by M. G. Lewis as The Bravo of Venice in 1804. The Ritterroman focuses on the life and deeds of the knights and soldiers, but features many elements found in the gothic novel, such as magic, secret tribunals, and medieval setting. Benedikte Naubert's novel Hermann of Unna (1788) is seen as being very close to the Schauerroman genre.

Other early authors and works included Christian Heinrich Spiess, with his works Das Petermännchen (1793), Der alte Überall und Nirgends (1792), Die Löwenritter (1794), and Hans Heiling, vierter und letzter Regent der Erd- Luft- Feuer- und Wasser-Geister (1798); Heinrich von Kleist's short story "Das Bettelweib von Locarno" (1797); and Ludwig Tieck's Der blonde Eckbert (1797) and Der Runenberg (1804). Early examples of female-authored Gothic include Sophie Albrecht's Das höfliche Gespenst (The Polite Ghost) (1797) and Graumännchen oder die Burg Rabenbühl: eine Geistergeschichte altteutschen Ursprungs (Graumännchen, or Castle Rabenbühl: A Ghost Story) (1799).

==== French roman noir ====
The roman noir ("black novel") appeared in France, by such writers as François Guillaume Ducray-Duminil, Baculard d'Arnaud and Madame de Genlis. The Marquis de Sade used a subgothic framework for some of his fiction, notably The Misfortunes of Virtue (1791) and Eugenie de Franval, though the Marquis himself never thought of his work like this. Sade critiqued the genre in the preface of his Reflections on the novel (1800) stating that the Gothic is "the inevitable product of the revolutionary shock with which the whole of Europe resounded". Contemporary critics of the genre also noted the correlation between the French Revolutionary Terror and the "terrorist school" of writing represented by Radcliffe and Lewis.

=== Gothic and Romanticism ===
In 1799 the philosopher William Godwin wrote St. Leon: A Tale of the Sixteenth Century, which influenced St. Irvyne; or, The Rosicrucian (1811) by Godwin's future son-in-law Percy Bysshe Shelley and Frankenstein (1818), which was dedicated to Godwin, and written by his daughter Mary Shelley. Female Anglo-Irish authors also wrote Gothic fiction in the 19th century, including Regina Maria Roche, whose novel Clermont (1798) went through several editions, and Sydney Owenson, most famous for The Wild Irish Girl (1806). Gothic tales started to appear also in women's magazines like The Lady's Monthly Museum (1798-1832). Further contributions to the Gothic genre were seen in the work of the first generation of Romantic poets: Samuel Taylor Coleridge's The Rime of the Ancient Mariner (1798) and Christabel (1816).
