= Little Wrecks =

2017 debut novel by Meredith Miller

First edition (pbl. HarperCollins)

Little Wrecks is the first novel by Meredith Miller.

== Style ==
The novel is first and foremost a character-study of three sixteen-to-seventeen-year-old girls (Isabel, Magdalene (Magda), and Ruth), and has been characterised as 'crafted in a New American Gothic style'. It is divided into three books: 'Resistance', 'Reality', and 'Resurrection'. It is written in the present tense and third person, using free indirect discourse to narrate events from the points of view of the three main characters (and, in book 2 chapter 14, from the perspective of a minor character, Lefty. Here the prose style converges with Lefty's poetic mode of speech). By switching between each of the main characters' perspectives, the novel conveys how each is self-absorbed and struggling to establish an independent identity, presenting this as a key aspect of teenage experience. A large proportion of the novel comprises direct speech, characterised by sassy dialogue and language that evokes the 1970s setting.

The novel alludes extensively to music of the period, and to other literature.

== Summary ==
The novel is set in the fictitious coastal town of Highbone, on Long Island, over about four weeks in May–June 1979. Insofar as there is a unifying thread to the plot, it is that the best friends Isabel, Magda, and Ruth attempt to finance their escape from their stifling home town by stealing cannabis. Isabel hears her boyfriend Charlie's plan to rob a local cannabis-dealer, Matt. In the first book, Isabel decides to steal the cannabis herself. Isabel and Ruth successfully steal Matt's stash, while Magda hides it in her carriage house. In the second book, Magda is beaten and date-raped by an older man she is trying to convince to be their fence, and in the third, Magda insists that Isabel and Ruth restore order to their world by secretly returning the stolen stash, which they do.

Amidst this plot, the novel compares and contrasts its main characters by describing their parallel experiences, and exposing the structural similarities in their lives. They continually contemplate one another's mothers as role models: Isabel's is mentally ill and withdrawn; Magda's has fled her abusive husband, leaving Magda to look after her six-year-old brother Henry; and Ruth's is a hippy. Parallel experiences often invite the reader to compare characters in pairs: Isabel and Magda have heterosexual relationships which illustrate patriarchal violence (Isabel with Charlie, who fantasises that he is raping her, and Magda with Jeff, who does rape her); Isabel and Ruth respond to patriarchy with violence (Isabel by murdering a man who sexually assaults her and Ruth by tampering with the brakes on her mother's boyfriend's car); Isabel and Ruth have homosexual sex (with each other); and Ruth and Magda manage to navigate their patriarchal environment successfully enough to avoid imprisonment.

The novel closes with Isabel detained for murder, Magda contemplating suicide, and Ruth parting from both Magda and Mackie as she establishes a newly independent personality.

== Reviews ==
- Liz Sunderman, VOYA, 40.2 (June 2017)
- Kirkus Reviews (1 April 2017)
- Ryan P. Donovan, School Library Journal (1 June 2017)
- Ilana Lucas, '3 New Books About Taking on the World', Brit + Co (2 July 2017)
- Emily G., 'Little Wrecks', Teenreads (17 August 2017)
