= Love's Pilgrimage =

Love's Pilgrimage may refer to:

- Love's Pilgrimage (play), a play by Francis Beaumont and John Fletcher, written c. 1615–16 and first published in 1647.
- Love's Pilgrimage (novel), a 1911 novel by Upton Sinclair
