= The New Inn =

Play written by Ben Jonson

The New Inn, or The Light Heart is a Caroline era stage play, a comedy by English playwright and poet Ben Jonson.

The New Inn was licensed for performance by Sir Henry Herbert, the Master of the Revels, on 19 January 1629, and acted later that year by the King's Men at the Blackfriars Theatre. The original production was a "catastrophic failure ... hissed from the Blackfriars stage ... ." An intended Court performance never took place, according to Jonson's epilogue to the play in the 1631 edition. Jonson was profoundly affected by the failure, and wrote about the affair in his poetic "Ode to Himself" ("Come leave the loathed stage, / And the more loathsome age ...").

The play was first published in octavo in 1631, printed by Thomas Harper; only two copies are known to exist. It was not included in the second folio collection of Jonson's works in 1640–41, and was next printed in the third Jonson folio in 1692.

While The New Inn is not one of the poet's major works, it has, like any Jonson play, attracted its share of critical attention. One curious fact noted by scholars is that Jonson's play contains material that is also found in Love's Pilgrimage, a play in the John Fletcher canon that was written around 1616 and published in the first Beaumont and Fletcher folio in 1647. The common passages are Love's Pilgrimage, I,1,25–63 and 330–411, and The New Inn, II,5,48–73 and III,1,57–93 and 130–68. Scholars and critics have attempted to account for the common material in various ways; the most likely possibility seems to be that an anonymous reviser borrowed Jonsonian work to enrich Fletcher's play during a revision done around 1635.

== Synopsis ==
The New Inn is set in an inn-house in Barnett called the "Light Heart", whose host is Goodstock. Lady Frances Frampul invites some lords and gentlemen to wait on her at the inn. A melancholy gentlemen, Lord Lovel, has been lodged there some days before. In the third act, he is demanded by Lady Frampul what love is and describes so vividly the effects of love that she becomes enamoured of him.

Lady Frampul's chambermaid, Prudence, dresses up as queen for the day and presides over a mock "court of love". As part of their theatrical project, Prudence and Lady Frampul decide to dress up the Host's adopted son Franck in a cross-gender attire as Laetitia, a waiting-woman. Lord Beaufort, guest to Lady Frampul, falls in love with Laetitia and marries her in secret, only to be denounced for marrying a boy.

But in the end, in a series of far-fetched revelations, Frank turns out to be a woman, Lady Frampul's long-lost sister. The Host proves to be their father, Lord Frampul, in disguise, and Laetitia's Irish nurse turns out to be their mother.

== Legacy ==
The main character in Ludwig Tieck's novel William Lovell, published in 1795–1896, was inspired by Lovel in The New Inn.
