= The Devil's Elixirs =

1815 novel by E. T. A. Hoffmann

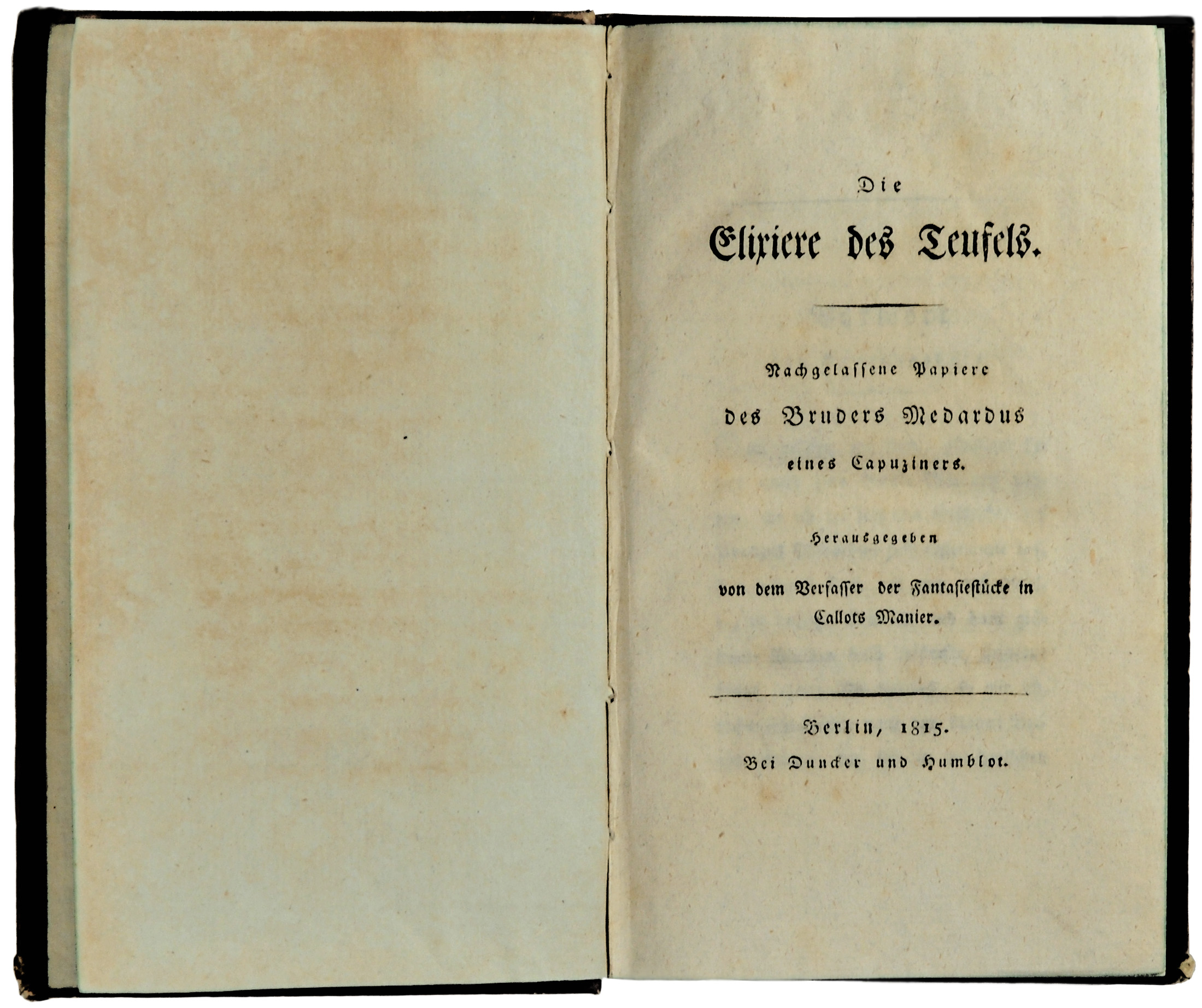
- The title page of Volume 1 of the first edition
- Author: E. T. A. Hoffmann
- Original title: Die Elixiere Des Teufels
- Language: German
- Publication date: 1815/16

The Devil's Elixirs (German: Die Elixiere des Teufels) is an 1815 novel by E. T. A. Hoffmann. The basic idea for the story was adopted from Matthew Gregory Lewis's novel The Monk, which is itself mentioned in the text. However, his treatment of the story of a fallen Monk was more deeply probing of the human psyche, and was considered far superior by the German poet and critic, Heinrich Heine. Story lines in plays by Pedro Calderon and Heinrich von Kleist, which Hoffman directed in 1811, were also influential.

Hoffman wrote the novel while living in Bamberg and visited the Catholic Capuchin monastery there. Although he was nominally a Lutheran, he made an entry in his diary that he was favorably impressed by the religious atmosphere, and he determined to write the novel in that setting. The visit provided authentic details for his monk. Characteristically for Hoffmann, he wrote the novel quickly. He completed the actual writing of part 1 in five weeks in 1814 and part 2 during several months in 1815.

The Devil's Elixirs is described by some literary critics as fitting into the German genre, Schauerroman, which may more properly be considered as part of a interrelated complex, "the literature of the uncanny", that includes English Gothic, German Schauerroman, and French littérature fantastique, prominent during the late 18th and early 19th centuries, as well as subsequent gothic works by writers in the later 19th century and beyond, initiated most notably by Edgar Allan Poe.

From this perspective, Medardus, the protagonist, is a debauched monk who is born into a world manipulated by fate reminiscent of Nemesis. However, the story is deeply ambiguous and can also be read as a Christian redemption narrative that may have been over emphasized in the available English translations. In this alternate narrative the world is ultimately controlled by Providence which leads to Medardus's redemption.

The Devil's Elixirs was said by scholars of his era, and the present, to follow from the graphic tradition of the grotesques of Jacques Callot.

== Synopsis ==
The Devil's Elixirs (referred to hereafter as Elixirs) is predominantly a first-person narrative related by the Capuchin monk Medardus. The following summary of his unreliable narrative is based primarily on a German lecture.

Medardus (birth name, Franz) is ignorant of his family history and what he knows about his childhood is based upon fragments of memory and a few events his mother has explained to him. His father, a sinful man, repents and is told that he will receive redemption through the birth of a son. He dies at the moment of Franz's birth. Franz's first conscious memories are of the Monastery of the Holy Linden, which has been adorned by religious paintings by an Old Painter who has disappeared.

He and his mother meet the Abbess who hugs him; however, he is wounded by a diamond crucifix which she wears around her neck. The Abbess takes them under her care, and he is able to study at a Capuchin monastery where he becomes a monk and takes his religious name.

However, his sincerity wanes and he becomes a famed (but self-aggrandizing) preacher. He loses his eloquence after being confronted by the Old Painter, (unknown to Medardus at the time but distinguished by his dark eyes and purple cloak). He regains his eloquence after drinking the devil's elixir, a relic of Saint Anthony, a flask of wine offered to the saint by Satan, which he had refused to drink. While in the chapel, he has a dream (which seems like reality) of being approached by a beautiful young woman resembling Saint Rosalia depicted in the altarpiece painting. She asks him to hear her confession, and she confesses her love for him. He becomes infatuated and decides to escape the monastery to seek her. But before he makes his escape, the prior sends him on a mission to Rome.

In his subsequent travels, Medardus finds a man in a military uniform on a point of rock that projects over an abyss. When Medardus attempts to wake him, the man is startled, falls, and is apparently killed. (The actual circumstances are ambiguous.) Unbeknownst to all involved, the man is Count Viktorin, Medardus's look-alike half-brother. Viktorin had been on the way to meet his lover, Euphemie. He had planned to meet her at the local Baron's castle disguised as a monk. Much later, it is revealed that Euphemie is Medardus's half-sister.

Euphemie attempts to renew her relations with the fake Viktorin, but Medardus rejects her after he becomes infatuated with Aurelie, the Baron's daughter. Medardus attempts to seduce Aurelie; but she is protected by her brother, Hermogen. They later fight and Medardus kills Hermogen in self-defense. Euphemie also dies from a poison which she had intended for Medardus. An alarm is sounded and he flees. Meanwhile, It turns out that Viktorin is not dead; and he becomes Medardus's lunatic doppelgänger.

After his escape he takes the alias "Leonard" and assumes a new personality. Adventures continue at the home of a forester and in a principality headed by an eccentric Prince who becomes his friend. Although Pietro Belcampo (alias Peter Schönfeld), a foolish barber, had helped him change his appearance, when Aurelie arrives at the principality, she recognizes him as Medardus, her brother's killer, which is confirmed by the cruciform scar on his neck. He is arrested but released by the Prince after the doppelgänger, who has a similar scar, confesses.

After Leonard is freed, Aurelie accepts his new identity, befriends him, and they become engaged. He finds a letter from Aurelie to her aunt, the Abbess, that discloses that she had earlier had a dream about confessing her love for him in a agonized counterpart of his own dream. Just before the wedding, he has a fit of madness after hearing the voice of the doppelgänger as he passes by on the way to his execution. He stabs Aurelie; attacks the doppelgänger and unintentionally frees him. They continue fighting as he runs, into the wilderness. He loses consciousness as a result of wounds and awakens in an Italian monastery, saved by Belcampo.

He proceeds to Rome where he pursues his mission as emissary to the pope. Returned to his original identity, Medardus undergoes an intense process of repentance, he learns that Aurelie didn't die and discovers his family history by reading a parchment book written by the Old Painter, the families sinful, but repentant, ancient progenitor.

After a nearly fatal encounter with the inquisition, Medardus returns to the Capuchin monastery where a feast is being held – Aurelie is soon to take her final vows to become a nun. Her monastic name is to be Rosalia. Once again, he must struggle with his lust. Just as he seems to have mastered it, the doppelgänger rushes in and stabs Aurelie, fatally this time, and once more escapes. Aurelie confesses her love for Medardus as she is dying.

At the end, Medardus writes the story of his life as an act of penance. A final note from the monastery librarian reveals the circumstances of his death. He had the cell next to Medardus, where he heard strange laughing and a horrible voice which invited Medardus to join his betrothed. A man with dark eyes and purple cloak (obviously the Old Painter) is seen leaving the cell. Medardus dies soon after, precisely one year after Aurelie on the feast day of Saint Rosalia. A vagabond named Peter Schônfeld, is found placing flowers at the portrait of the saint. He is taken in and becomes a lay monk.

== Francesko family tree and relationships ==
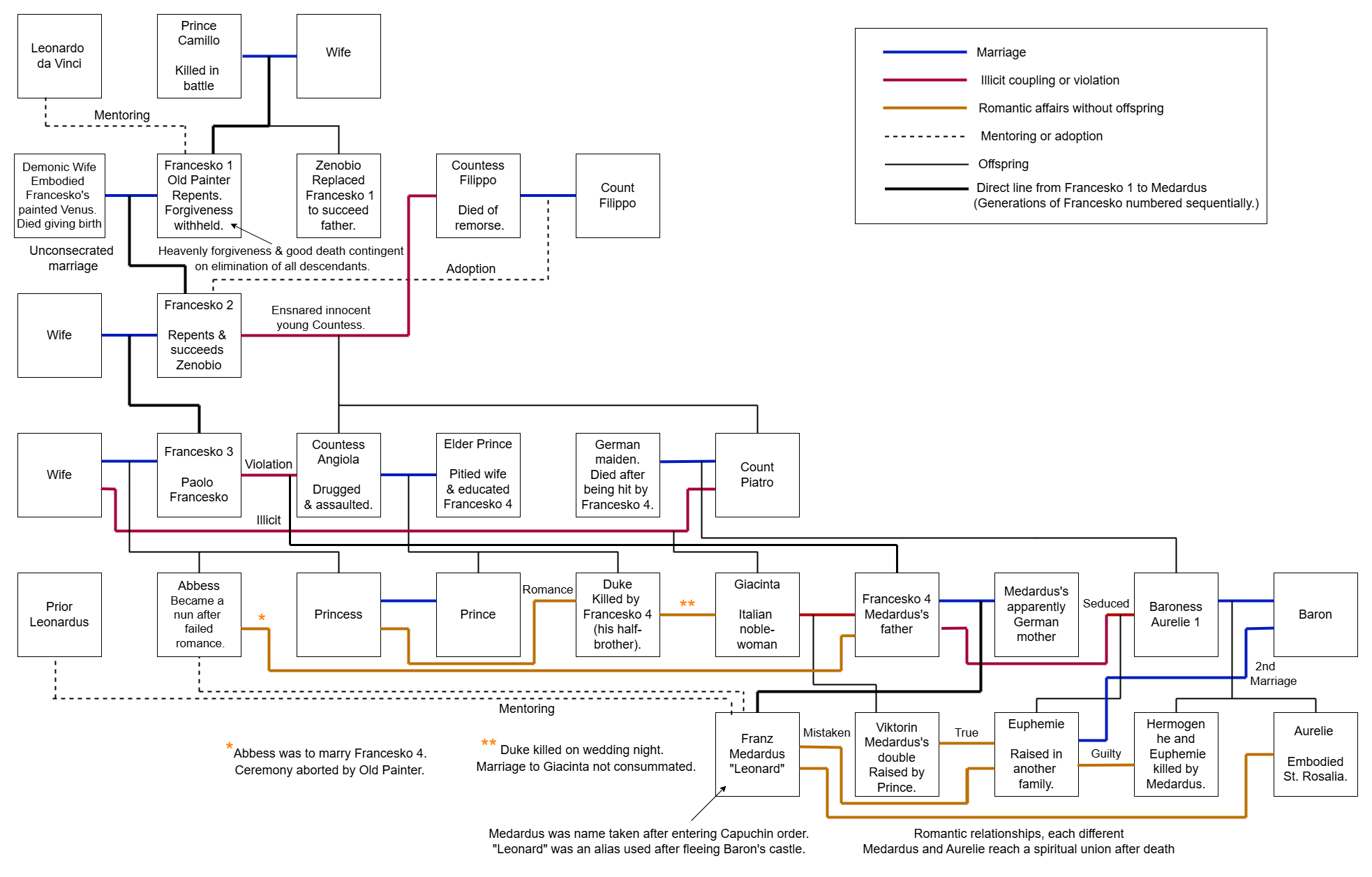
The Francesko family tree and romantic relationships depicted in The Devil's Elixirs by E. T. A. Hoffmann, 1815/16.

The life story of Medardus is imbedded in a larger story of five generations of the Francesko family. This larger context is revealed in the parchment book written by the progenitor of the family, the first Francesko (referred to hereafter simply as Francesko, although there are others with the same name). Medardus did not include the contents of the parchment book in his narrative. It was deciphered and inserted near the end of the second volume by the anonymous editor [Hoffmann] and seemingly resolves many of the puzzling aspects of the story up to that point. According to a journal article by Kenneth G. Negus, the parchment book account is the "focal point of the whole novel" and Francesko is the "prototype for Medardus". There are many parallels between Francesko and Medardus including:

- Character names – Francesko is the approximate Italian equivalent of Franz, Medardus's German birth name;
- Mentors – Francesko had Leonardo da Vinci; Medardus, Leonardus, prior of the Capuchin monastery;
- Artistic advocation – Francesko as an artist; Medardus as an orator;
- Loss of innocence – Both were initially pious but became lascivious and scorned religion;
- Love interest – Francesko married a demon woman, Medardus had an affair with Euphemie, who was similarly devious and amoral;
- Drinking of the devil's elixir – Both drink the wine which once tempted Saint Anthony, which promotes their immoral activities;
- Hideousness of lovers – When Frencesko's lover dies her body returns to a demonic form; when Medardus dreams of the dead Euphemie, she also appears demonic;
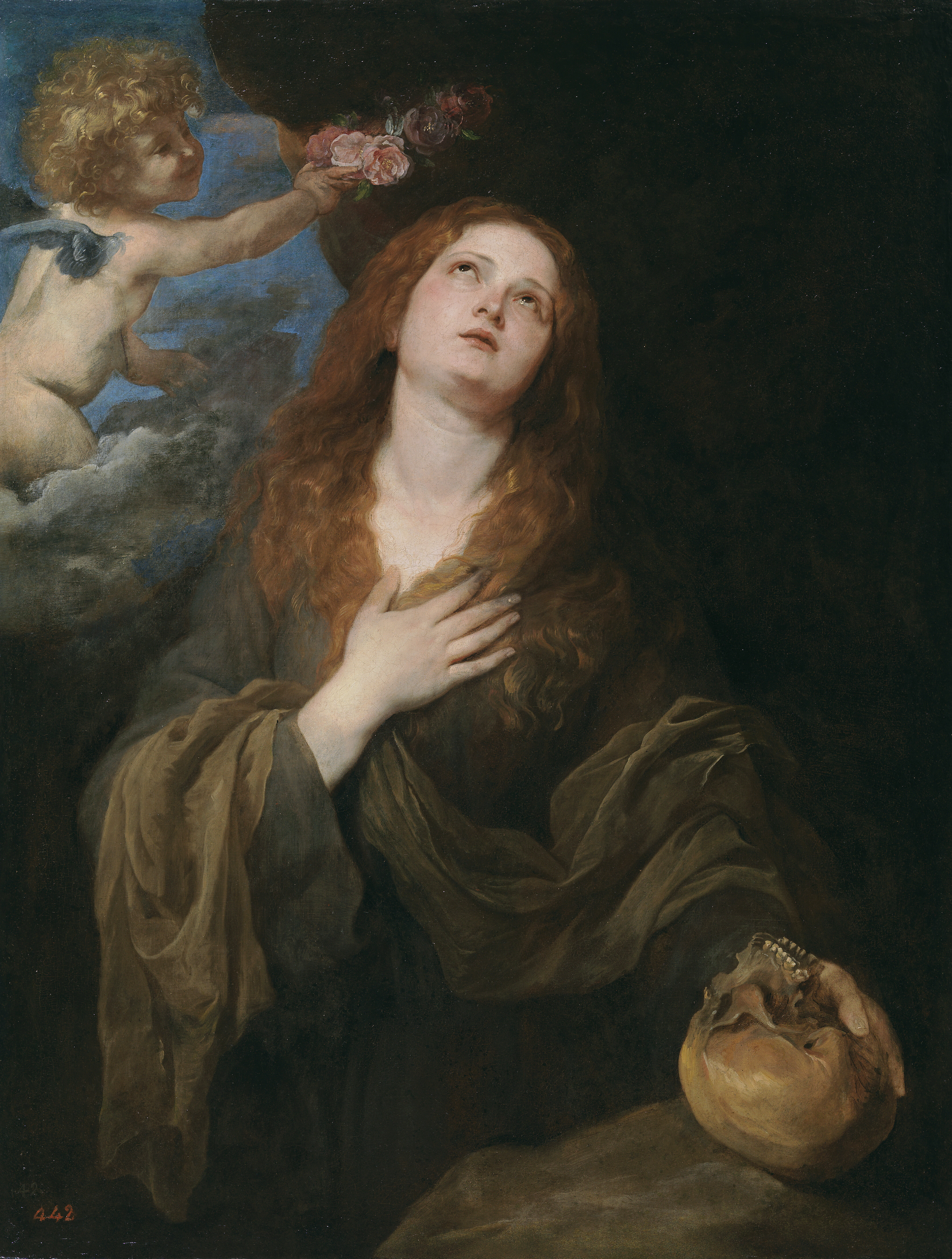
  Saint Rosalie by Anthony van Dyck, circa 1625.
- Idolizing painted images – Francesko falls in love with his erotic painting of Venus, which becomes animated; Medardus falls in love with the chaste image of Saint Rosalia (painted by a repentant Francesko), which becomes embodied by Aurelie;
- Repentance – Both repent and undertake harsh penance.

Francesko's great sin was to paint Saint Rosalia in a naked erotic pose. However, he later repents and undergoes harsh penance. After he repents, he prays to her and the Virgin Mary, and they intercede with heaven on his behalf. However, his sins and those of his descendants are so great that he can not be forgiven until the whole family line is eliminated. As described by Francesko:

The sins of my youth were indeed terrible, but I have been saved from perdition by the intercession of the Blessed Virgin and Saint Rosalia, and been permitted to suffer the torments of damnation here on earth until my sinful line shall have perished for ever.

— E. T. A. Hoffmann (1815/16) translated by Ronald Taylor (1963)

Francesko uses Medardus to accomplish his mission. He is harsh and ominous, even at Medardus' death. His final words said in a deep dark voice were, "The hour of fulfilment is not far hence". However, he also sought to protect him "with all the strength of his command".

On the other hand, James M. McGlathery concluded in another journal article that the perspectives of Francesko and Medardus likely differed:

To be sure, the Painter believes at the end of his chronicle that with the birth of Medardus the chain of sinful lust finally has been broken. Yet Medardus must unadmittedly find repugnant the implication that his lustful adventures were not a drama of personal salvation, but merely the fulfillment of a curse incurred by a sinful ancestor, and hence not so very different after all from the sexual temptations of all men as descendants of Adam.

— James M. McGlathery (1979)

Although the Francesko family tree is bewilderingly complex and the relationships between family members are often violent and misogynistic, Hoffman, as the editor, asks for the reader's forbearance while reading Francesko's account:

It may even be that, as you look more closely, what seemed formless will become clear and precise; you will come to recognize the hidden seed which, born of a secret union, grows into a luxuriant plant and spreads forth in a thousand tendrils, until a single blossom, swelling to maturity, absorbs all the life-sap and kills the seed itself.

— E. T. A. Hoffman (1815/16) translated by Ronald Taylor (1963)

There may be an unsettling aspect of the family tree. Francesko and his evil descendants are Italian, which "to Hoffmann as to his fellow Germans, Italy was that ambiguous realm of beauty and of horror, the land of Raphael and of the Borgias". The grandmother of Aurelie was a German maiden and the mother of Medardus was also apparently German. According to Charles E. Passage, "the impetus that enables the good strain in these dual natures to prevail over the evil strain, comes, it would seem, from an infusion of German blood".

== Motivation and antecedents ==
As noted above, a primary focus of Elixirs was on how family history affected the ability of Medardus to establish his own self-identity. In her paper, On Genealogy: Biology, Religion, and Aesthetics in E. T. A. Hoffmann's Elixiere des Teufels (1815–16) and Erasmus Darwin's Zoonomia (1794–96), Christine Lehleiter noted that incidences of incest and murder in the family history of Medardus were correlated with "the number of blood connections to the original progenitor" and "particularly strong in those descendants who are the offspring of one or several incestuous relationships". She then went on to question the extent to which Hoffmann (without the benefit of information learned from the science of genetics) considered the importance of heredity in this regard.

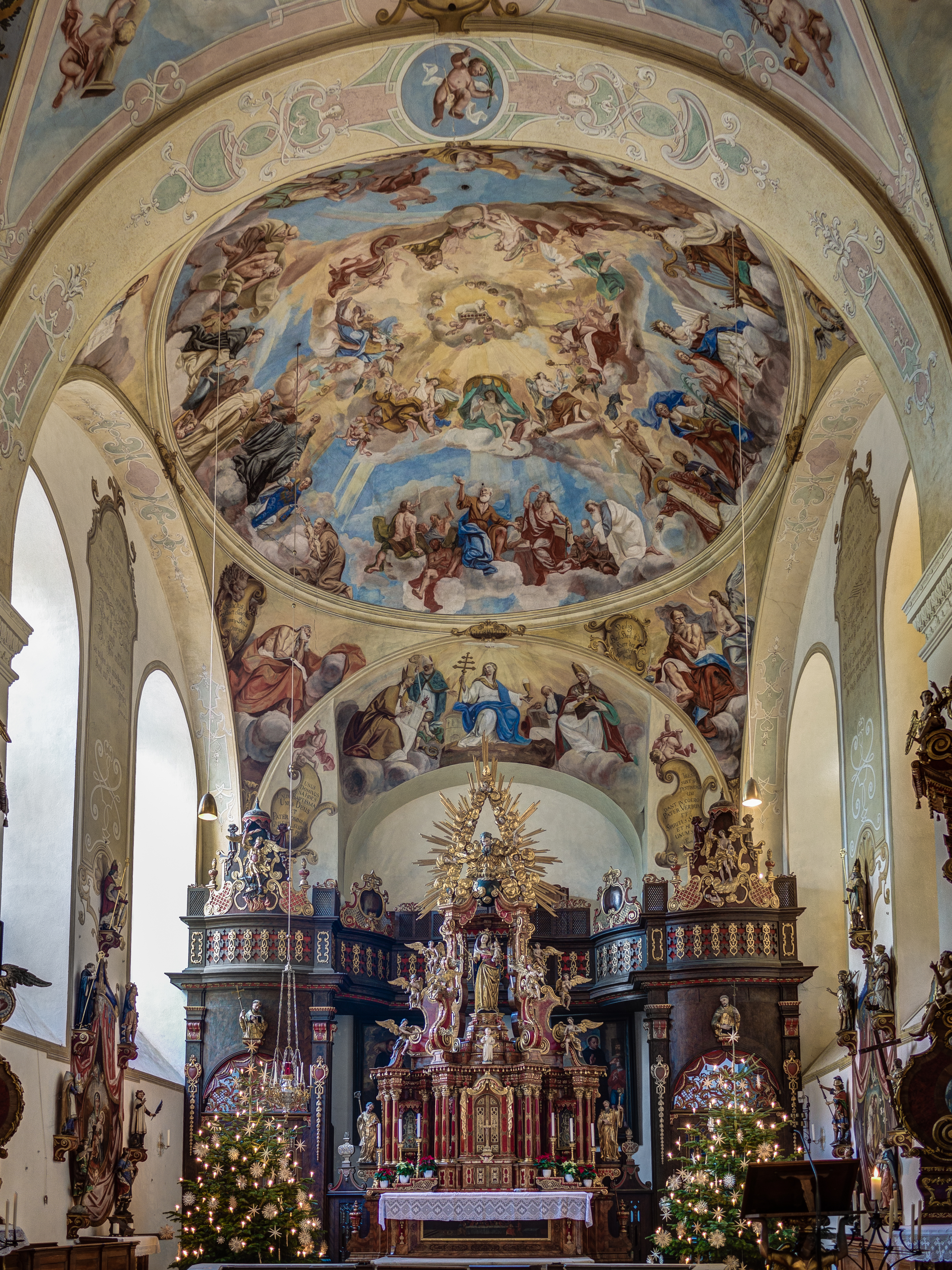
Church of the mental asylum in Bamberg St. Getreu. E. T. A. Hoffman was a close friend of the director of the asylum, Dr. Adalbert Marcus, and referred to it in The Devil's Elixirs.

In 1796, Erasmus Darwin (grandfather of Charles Darwin) published the second volume of his work, Zoonomia. It included statements such as, "The disposition to insanity, as well as to convulsion, is believed to be hereditary; and in consequence to be induced in those families from slighter causes than in others". His book was translated into German about two years later; and, while clinical in nature and focused on treatment, it apparently helped spawn a philosophical debate there concerning the nature of selfhood. Hoffman often visited the library of his friend Carl Friedrich Kunz which contained a copy. According to Lehleiter, it is safe to assume that Hoffmann studied Kunz's copy of Darwin's Zoonomia, since he was "preoccupied" with mental disease.

He was a close friend of Dr. Adalbert Marcus, director of the mental asylum at St. Getreu, and conferred with him about mental disease. St. Getreu is specifically mentioned in Elixirs and its director praised by the prior in the Prince's court:

I decided to hand him [assumed to be Viktorin] over to the mental asylum at St. Getreu for I hoped that, if it were possible at all to restore him to health, the director of this asylum, a highly gifted doctor with an extensive knowledge of all mental abnormalities, would be able to do so.

— E. T. A. Hoffman (1815/16) translated by Ronald Taylor (1963)

He was motivated to explore this topic because of concern for his own mental health, there being a tendency for insanity in his family. An entry in his diary stated in effect that he thought about madness "much of the time, whether awake or asleep".

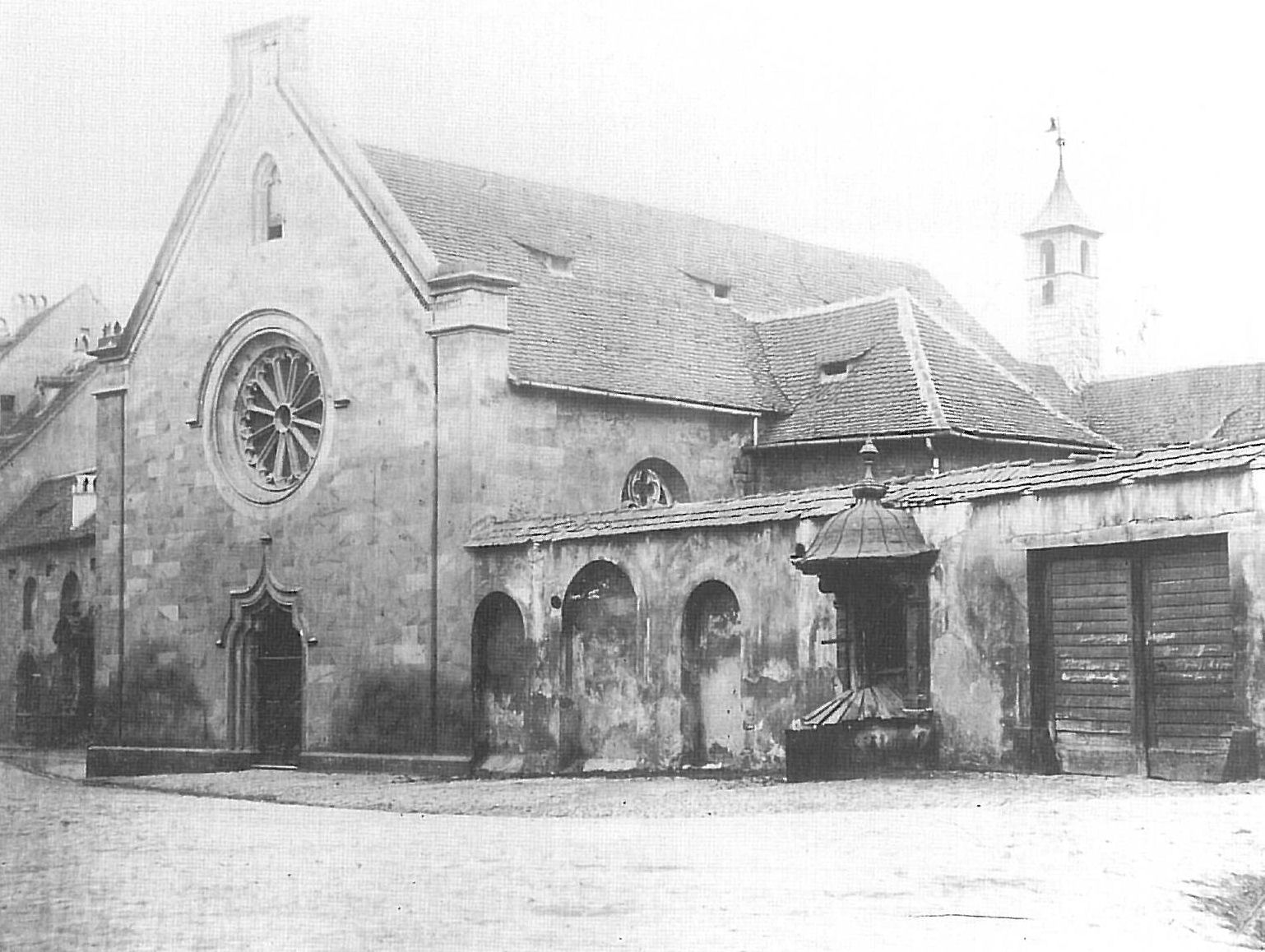
The Capuchin monastery in Bamberg visited by E. T. A. Hoffmann.

The setting for the story in a Capuchin monastery was influenced by his visit to the monastery in Bamberg (Kapuzinerkloster Bamberg) and with the Catholic ambiance of that part of Germany with which he had a favorable impression, although he was nominally a Lutheran. In addition, his experience as a jurist gave him insights into human nature. This experience may have been particularly influential in his descriptions of interactions of Medardus with his judge.

His platonic relationship with Julia Marc, who attracted him with her "ethereal soprano voice" also appears influential. She appears to have been the model for Aurelie. One specific experience involving Julia Marc found its way into Elixirs, Hoffmann had been attempting to paint her but was unable to get an acceptable image of her face so that he finally gave up. This circumstance is reminiscent of Francesko's attempt to paint St. Rosalia which he gave up after many attempts because he could not do her face properly.

In another incident, the Painter (the first Francesko several generations later) was painting Giacinta, the Duke's love interest. When he was interrupted by the Duke, he ruined the painting by disfiguring the face which made the Duke recoil in horror.

Passage describes three primary literary influences on Elixirs. The first was The Monk. a Romance by the British author Matthew Gregory Lewis, who himself was influence by German literature. In 1792, at the age of 17, he moved to Germany, met Goethe, and translated works by Schiller. Back in Britain, he first published The Monk in 1797, which was translated to German as Der Mönch, the same year by Fr. von Oertel.

Ambrosio, the chief protagonist in The Monk, was a foundling raised by Capuchin monks. He grew to become a devout abbot; but, like Medardus, he then becomes a prideful orator who falls into debauchery. Prior to the fall, he had thought of himself on a par with Saint Anthony, particularly in his ability to resist temptation. Analogous to Francesko, he couples with a woman (Matilda) who was an emissary of the devil. As first told, she used a portrait of herself as the Madonna to help ensnare him. The moment he first sees Matilda's full face is described as follows:

She started at the sound, and turned towards him hastily. The suddenness of her movement made her cowl fall back from her head; her features became visible to the monk’s inquiring eye. What was his amazement at beholding the exact resemblance of his admired Madonna ! The same exquisite proportion of features, the same profusion of golden hair, the same rosy lips, heavenly eyes, and majesty of countenance, adorned Matilda ! Uttering an exclamation of surprise, Ambrosio sank back upon his pillow, and doubted whether the object before him was mortal or divine.

— The Monk by Matthew Gregory Lewis (1796/1907)

It is later revealed that Matilda was given the appearance of Madonna in the painting by Satan.

There is also a parallel between Aurelie and the innocent Antonia, another target of Ambrosio's lust. She prays daily in front of a statue of Saint Rosalia, her patroness and also very dear to Aurelie.

Unlike Medardus and Francesko, Ambrosio is not able to repent. Faced with torture and burning at the stake by the inquisition for his horrible crimes, he buys rescue from Satan. However, Satan throws him down on a mountain peak where he is impaled. Before his death Satan revealed to him that Antonia, who he raped and killed, was his sister and that her mother, who he also killed to prevent her from disclosing his crime, was his mother.

Calderon's Spanish drama, Devotion to the Cross (La Devoción de la cruz) was the second major influence. The play was translated into German by August Wilhelm Schlegel in 1811, Hofmann directed performances shortly thereafter.

As in Elixirs, the story includes a failed romantic affair between siblings, in this instance between a brother and his twin sister. Like Euphemie and Viktorin, they were raised separately and do not know they are related. They were born next to the Cross where there mother died and each bore the imprint of a cross on their chest, analogous to the imprint of a cross that Medardus and Victorin each had on their neck.

Both committed many crimes including numerous murders. In the end, somewhat like Viktorin, Eusebio dies after falling from a cliff. He had been chased to the edge by a mob of peasants and Julia's father, revealed to also be his father. However, Julia is saved. When she is about to be killed by her father for her crimes, Julia is carried to heaven while clinging to the cross from Eusebio's grave.

The third major influence was Das Käthchen von Heilbronn (1807/08) by Heinrich von Kleist. It premiered in 1810 in Vienna. Hoffmann directed a production in Bamberg in 1811. The lead characters, Count von Strahl and Käthchen, his future wife, have the same dream although they haven't met yet. However, their dreams were pure, while the mutual dreams of Medardus and Aurelie were not.

The legend of Saint Anthony and the Devils elixirs told to Medardus was apparently based on a saying in The Anonymous Sayings of the Desert Fathers which includes an exchange between Satan and Abba Macarius, not Saint Anthony, who is included elsewhere. The exchange went as follows:

Consequently, while Macarius, that magnificent soldier of Christ, was travelling into the remotest desert, he beheld a very old man coming towards him, heavily laden with a quantity of flasks all about his body and carrying a feather in each flask; he was wearing these instead of clothing ... [After a greeting,] Macarius replied, “but, tell me, who are you, old man, for your clothing is incompatible with man's wellbeing?

— The Anonymous Sayings of the Desert Fathers (about 500 AD) translated by John Worthey (2013)

The man is then forced to confess that he is Satan and that he uses the wine flasks to tempt individuals, each tailored to their particular moral weakness. A very similar scene involving Saint Anthony is depicted in Elixirs; however, the following embellishment was added:

By chance, so we are also told, St Anthony once opened one of these bottles, out of which there arose directly a strange and stupefying vapour, whereupon all sorts of hideous apparitions and spectral phantoms from hell had environed the Saint, in order to terrify and delude him. Above all, too, there were forms of women, who sought to entice him into shameless indecencies.

— E. T. A. Hoffman (1815/16), anonymous English translation, The Devil's Elixir (1829)

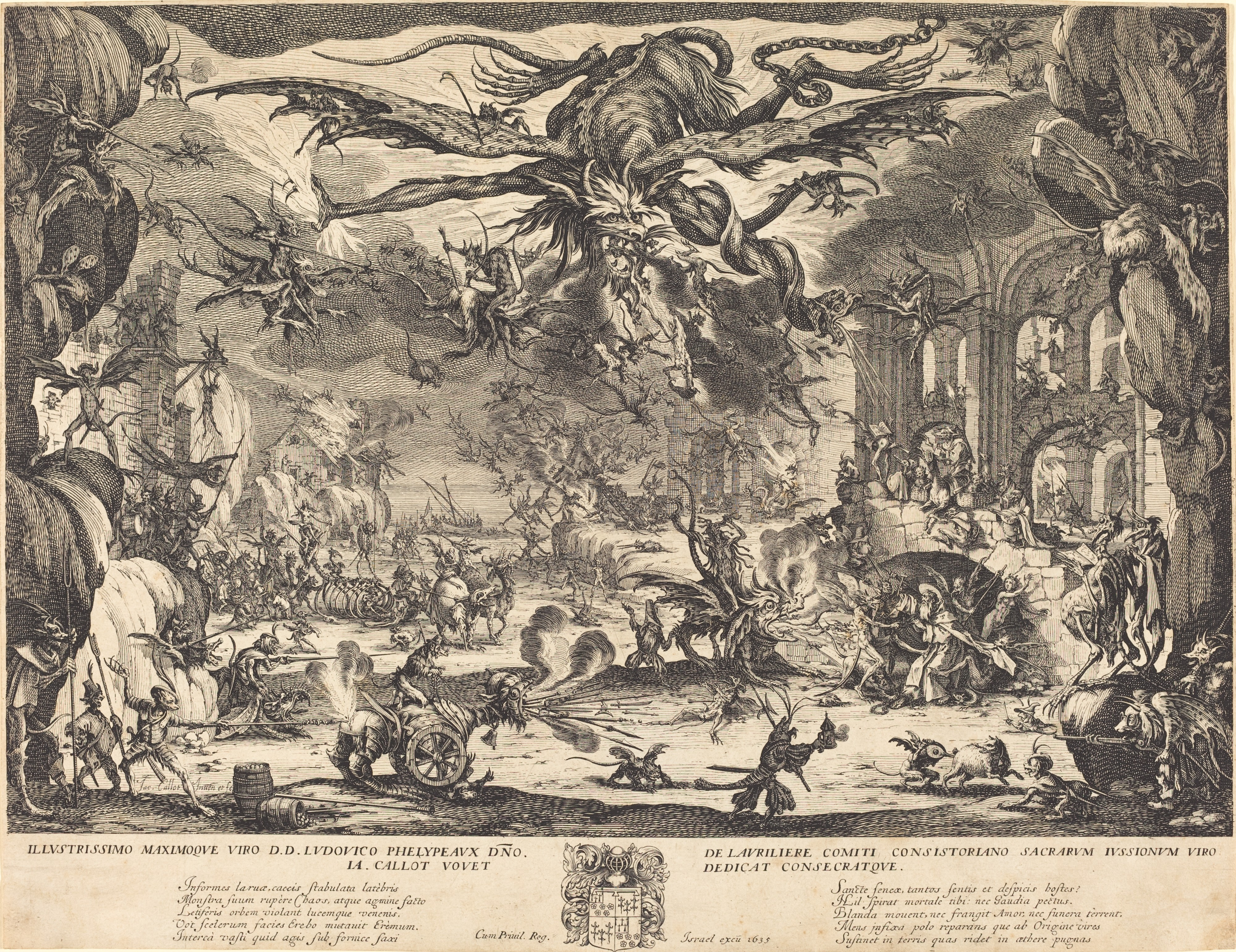
The Temptation of Saint Anthony, etching by Jacques Callot, 1635.

In a story with frequent references to the Old Painter and his works, the influence of art would naturally be important. The title page included the descriptor (loose translation) "Published by the author of the Fantasy Pieces in Callot's Manner". The Translators Preface of the 1824 English translation stated,

It is fair to observe, that the Author's design in the present instance was by no means to make a regular novel or romance, but to present his readers with a grotesque and half-ironical, half-serious sketch, in the manner of the celebrated Callot, an artist well-known (since the year 1620) in France and Germany ... Devil's Elixir will be best understood by any one who happens to possess in his portfolio a good selection from the 1380 engravings said to have been left by Jacques Callot, who died, aged only 43, in 1636.

— anonymous Translator's Preface, Devil's Elixir (1824)

In modern times, Callot's influence was also referenced in a book-chapter essay by Hannah-Freya Blake, which included a print of his etching The Temptation of Saint Anthony. Callot also did an etching of the Holy Family, a painting of which features in the book.

Another example occurs after Medardus was carried to a monastery in Italy following his attempted murder of Aurelie. There he had an hallucination reminiscent of a Bosch painting, which he narrated as follows:

People who I had known in the past suddenly appeared before me once again, their faces now grotesquely disfigured like the grimaces of madmen ... I recognized the choirmaster from B. and his sister. She was spinning round in a frantic waltz, while her brother was playing the music, vigorously stroking his own chest which had been transformed into a violin...

— E. T. A. Hoffmann (1815/16) translated by Ian Sumter (2007)

In another example noted by Sumter, Medardus comments that a painting of the Abbess by a foreign painter [Francesko] displayed in the market place was like that of a Van Dyck.

== Parallels with grotesque art ==
Blake's book-chapter essay, noted above, describes the parallels between Grotesque art and gothic literature. Grotesques are noted for the chimera like combinations of animals and humans. In her view, this blending symbolizes: "the falsity, and even the absurdity, of boundaries, binaries, and hierarchies." Similarly, gothic fiction blurs the distinction between "life and death, reality and fantasy, sanity and insanity".

In Elixirs, this blending is manifested in the doublings which remain ambiguous. Medardus himself does not know if Viktorin is real or imaginary. When Viktorin first appears to Medardus, he is horrified and confused:

But, oh horrible sight! at that moment arose, and stood bodily before me, the hideous blood-stained and distorted figure of Victorin! I thought it was not I, but he, that had spoken the words in which I thought to triumph! At the first glance of this apparition, (whether real or imaginary,) my hair stood on end with horror.

— E. T. A. Hoffman (1815/16) translated by Robert Pearse Gillies (1824/29)

Belcampo is also an avatar of Medardus. For example, when they first meet, he mimics Medardus's demeanor as a monk and even his triumphant hubris when preaching, which he is somehow able to intuit.

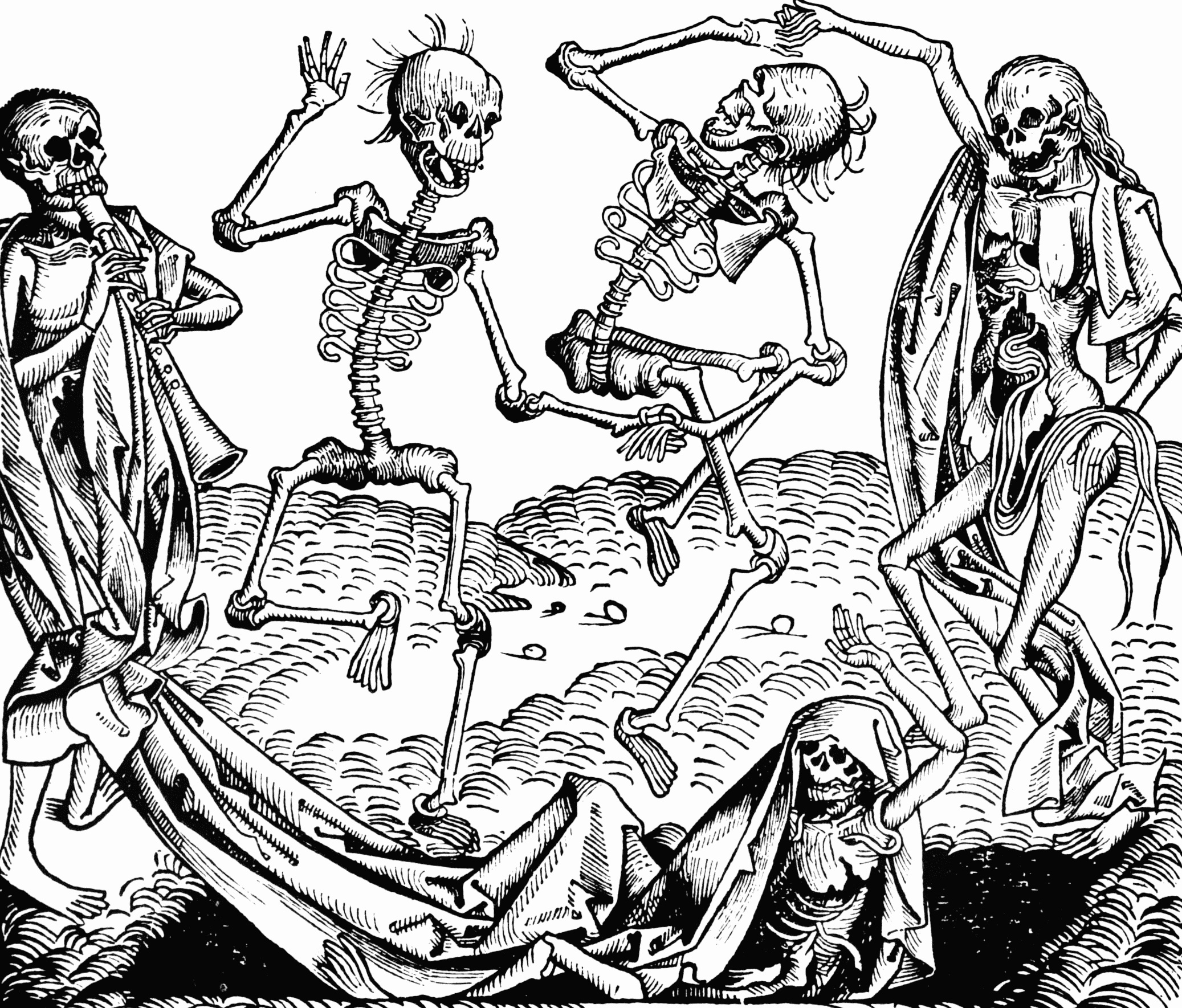
The Dance of Death (1493) by Michael Wolgemut reprinted in Hannah-Freya Blake's essay

On another occasion he is able to comprehend that the Old Painter is real and supernatural in origin: "he is 'Ahasuerus, the Wandering Jew, or Bertram de Bornis [i.e. Bertran de Born], Mephistopheles, or Benvenuto Cellini, or Judas Iscariot; in short, a wicked revenant'. The possibilities of what the painter might be, the repetitive 'or', reflects Medardus’s own numerous identities". Included among these are Franz, Medardus, Leonard, and even Saint Anthony, which he declared in a fit of madness while preaching.

Belcampo himself is a double. He explains to Medardus that “there is an infamous wicked fellow that lurks concealed within me, and says, ‘Peter Fairfield, be no longer an ass, and believe that thou existest; for I am properly thou’”.

While Belcampo's antics provide comic relief, the whole structure of Elixirs elicits grim humor, much like the dancing skeletons in Michael Wolgemut's, The Dance of Death. She concludes that "Hoffmann’s novel ... has such absurd scenes of madness that the comic, which is tied to the affect of the grotesque, is irrefutable".

== Shifting philosophies ==
In a review of the arc of Hoffmann's artistic works, Robert Mollenauer recognized three phases. Hoffmann initially was a musical composer and critic and was a great admirer of the music of Beethoven. During the first phase of his artistic career, he had a positive view of romanticism based primarily on an emotional response to the music. However, as his musical aspirations began to falter, he felt compelled to take up writing as his main artistic outlet and the change was accompanied by bitterness about having to give up his first love.

Thus, in the second phase of his artistic development, his views of romanticism turned negative and his writing became ironic. Mollenauer highlighted Elixers as an example. He claimed that irony is its underlying theme. As evidence, he cited a number of instances in which Hoffmann specifically mentioned irony. For example, at the conclusion, Prior Leonardus described the final state of Peter Schönfeld who had become a lay monk as follows "Peter’s inner light faded away amongst the vapours of madness which manifested themselves in his heart as the irony of life". In Mollenauer's view "The final words of the Elixiere thereby see the basis of life to be irony". Madness was also a recurrent theme and linked with irony in Hoffmann's mind.

In the last phase of his artistic development, Hoffmann seemed to come to terms with life's irony; he returned to a positive view of Romanticism; and the theme of his works became humor. Princess Brambilla, set in a Roman carnival, initiated this phase. In it "The ironic nature of life is reaffirmed, but the disparity is emphasized as humorous".

== Literary affinities ==
In his introduction to a collection of essays, Gothic Imagination: Essays in Dark Romanticism, G. R. Thompson proposed a genre of romantic and gothic works termed Dark Romanticism, or "Romantic Gothic literature", notable for the inclusion of "anthropomorphized evil" and an "ambiguous world structure". The Monk, predecessor of Elixirs was highlighted as an example. In addition, one of the essay authors commented that E. T. A. Hoffmann (along with Charles Brockden Brown and Edgar Allan Poe) had written masterpieces in "Romantic Gothicism" (presumably dark romanticism). Another essay noted that Faustian themes are "remarkably recurrent" in Dark Romantism, i.e. "the protagonist is driven to evil, cannot or will not repent, and is destroyed". However, Elixirs ends with Medardus returning to his monastery seemingly finding peace there.

In any event, Maximillian E. Novak, a reviewer in the journal Nineteen Century Literature was critical of Gothic Imagination. His main objections were "first of all, to its expansion of the concept of the Gothic to a point at which the term loses all real denotation ... and secondly, to its collective effort at proving that Gothic literature possesses "high seriousness". With respect to the second objection, he highlighted "the involuntary grin on Frankenstein's monster and on the skeletons that are dangled before us, with haunted houses, paintings that move, and with all the Grand-Guignol effects that are to be found in even the best Gothic fiction". In whatever way one might classify Elixirs, it has comic elements, particularly those associated by the fool, Pietro Belcampo. Unlike most of the characters in the story he is not related to the Francesko family, which provides him with an independent perspective and "enables him to remold much of the painfully serious material of the novel into a comic form".

Alexandra M. Reuber features Elixirs in her description of a complex of literary works which she called the "literature of the uncanny". In her PhD thesis, she uses the term, uncanny, as defined by Freud in his essay, The Uncanny (Das Unheimliche) (1919). He characterized uncanny as that which arouses dread and horror, which in her clarification includes phenomenon from the outside (e.g. the supernatural) and from the inside (especially the confrontation of the inner fantasy and the outer reality). Within this literature, she includes the English Gothic, German Schauerroman, and French littérature fantastique, prominent during the late 18th and early 19th centuries. After a gap of several decades, the tradition was renewed by writers in the later 19th century and beyond most notably Edgar Allan Poe. She uses the analogy of an obscure mansion to describe this genera:

Metaphorically speaking we can compare the "Literature of the uncanny" as an obscure mansion with its gothic cellar. Fantastic rooms and an uncanny attic / roof. The analogy is justified, since the stories' setting is not only one of the most important characteristics of the genre, but also shifts, over time, from a merely architectural to a rather psychological understanding. We will see that starting out from the gothic castles in Walpole's and Radcliffe's fiction, the notion of the uncanny leaves its gothic foundation, ascends through Shelley to the fantastic rooms, fully establishes itself there under Hoffmann, Nodier, and Gautier, until it reaches the uncanny "attic" in writings of, e.g., Poe, Maupassant, and James.

— Alexandra Reuber (2004)

In her chapter "Gothic Transformation into the Uncanny Fantastic" she includes two sections: "Scientific Shelley – Frankenstein, Or the Modern Prometheus" and "Fantastic Hoffmann", the latter devoted primarily to Elixirs. It begins with an account of Medardus's first sexual awakening which occurs with the daughter of the Monastery choirmaster. He represses his passionate feelings for her by becoming a monk. However, his repressed sexuality resurfaces when he becomes infatuated with the portrait of Saint Rosalia. He is so torn between his vows as a monk and his desire that it completely overwhelms his mind.

Hoffmann's psychological insights go well beyond those of his predecessor: "It is the combination of Medardus' suffering from the family curse with his longing for sexual wish fulfillment and the resulting guilty conscience that provokes this monk's temporary madness – a psychological outcome that is completely missing in Lewis' The Monk.

Reuber goes on to discuss other psychological innovations, particularly in regard to his double. For example, she writes that after Medardus assumes the role of Viktorin, "Medardus has reached a point in his life where he now not only meets his double, but consciously assumes the Other's identity as a result of his self-alienation and split self ... Hoffmann’s artistic display of Medardus' split personality and the resulting confrontation with his doubles inspires the monk's sincere sensation of terror, helplessness, and madness which distinguishes Medardus from Ambrosio [protagonist in The Monk]. Freud himself commented on Hoffmann's use of the double in Elixirs.

Christiane Zehl Romero devoted a paper to comparisons of Elixirs and The Monk. After listing the many similarities, she focused on the differences. One of the most important of these is the setting. Lewis set his story in Madrid, Spain, during the inquisition of the 16th century, far removed from his readers. Hoffmann set his story near Bamberg, Germany, in approximately the same era as his readers. Thus, Hoffmann removed the "delightful horror" effect, i.e. the reader's pleasure of experiencing horror at a safe distance. Also, by focusing on internal psychological horrors rather than the supernatural, the reader could feel a more direct threat. This approach was later taken up by Romantic Realists such as Gogol, Dostoevsky, Dickens, and Balzac.

As pointed out by Ian Sumter, Elixirs is also a detective story in which Medardus is "both the criminal and detective ... He must put together the pieces of his past to prove his innocence". Hoffmann cleverly withholds key information. For example, the woman who confesses her love for Medardus in the confessional wears a veil so that he can not identify her by sight later. In 1819, Hoffmann published Mademoiselle de Scuderi, which was a more explicit detective story. These were followed later in the 19th century by detective stories by Edgar Allan Poe and Wilkie Collins.

== English translations ==
As of 2024, three English translations have been published. In 1824, an abridged translation/adaptation by Robert Pearse Gillies (who was not credited), was published in two volumes as The Devil's Elixir. From the German of E. T. A. Hoffmann. Both volumes were reprinted in 1829. A modern unabridged translation by Ronald Taylor was published in 1963 as The Devil's Elixirs. Then in 2007, a translation by Ian Sumter was published as The Devil's Elixirs: The Posthumously Published Writings of Brother Medardus, a Capuchin Monk.

In his introduction, Ronald Taylor described the Gillies translation as "quaint and much shortened". Many of the omissions were explicitly indicated with statements in brackets such as "[A few sentences are here left out by the Editor]" or "[One page is here left out by the Editor]". These notes by the "Editor" are somewhat confusing because they do not distinguish between Hoffman, the original anonymous editor, and Gillies, the translator who assumes the role of an editor.

A contemporaneous review of Gillies translation described the translator's motivation for the omissions as follows:

His [the translator's] version is not only a faithful, but a highly elegant one; and in addition to this, the writer has shown great judgment in omitting certain details which would not have been over acceptable to the English public in its present mood. In a word, he has contrived to prune off all the indelicacy of his German original, without doing the smallest injury, to the author's genius; but, on the contrary, to the great and manifest benefit and advantage of the work, in every possible point of view.

— Blackwood's Edinburgh Magazine(1824)

In other words, the omission of sexually charged material was appropriate in the reviewers opinion. One such omission described Medardus's attempted seduction of Aurelie by asking her to pray with him. The following includes part of the omission as translated by Taylor:

And so, kneeling at my side and repeating my prayers with eyes directed heavenwards, she flushed deeper and deeper and her breast rose and fell in agitation. As if in the ardour of reverence I seized her hands and pressed them to my heart. I was so near to her that I felt the warmth of her body, and her flowing tresses fell over my shoulder. I was beside myself with frenzy and embraced her savagely, my kisses burning on her lips, her breast. With a piercing scream she tore herself from my arms and fled.

— E. T. A. Hoffman (1815/16) translated by Ronald Taylor (1963)

Such omissions seemingly diminished Hoffmann's depiction of the extent of Medardus's degradation even if they were not that long.

In his 2023 review which focused on English versions, Ritchi Roberston commented that the 1824 version is more of an adaptation than a translation. In addition to omitting sexual content, other important parts of the text were also omitted. For example, Aurelie's letter to the Abbess is largely replaced by a summary on the grounds that it is "very long" and repeats events already known to the reader "in a loose rambling style". Roberston also noted that Gillies added specific personal and place names not in the original story seemingly based on his own investigation or speculation. Furthermore, Gillies inserted a paragraph describing a town which Medardus visited after leaving the Castle of Baron von F_ apparently based on Gillies observations from his own residence in Germany; and there were numerous other such additions.

Robertson praised Taylor's translation, calling it almost "flawless in its accuracy and fluency". However, he did find discrepancies. For example, a sentence describing the seeming power of Medardus over Euphemie was translated as: "That power over life of which she boasted merited nothing but the most bitter scorn, for the moment she set out to play her reckless, immoral game with the most dangerous relationships in life, she would fall into the clutches of the evil destiny that I wielded over her" [emphasis added]. Robertson noted that the last phrase would more accurately be translated as "into the clutches of the evil destiny that guided my hand". He stated that "This is not a trivial slip, for its effect is to weaken the Nemesis aspect of the novel".

In a review of Taylor's translation, Professor James Trainer, a German scholar, stated that "Mr. Taylor's version entirely supersedes that of 1824 goes without saying, for what he offers us here is not only an un-abridged text but a fluent English style which sustains the eventful narrative without conceding anything to the many intricacies of plot and relationship so scrupulously developed by the author". However, while highly praiseworthy from a "literary-historical" perspective, he doubted that it would be well received by the general reading public, accustomed to "a less stodgy diet".

Robertson questioned the accuracy of Ian Sumter's translation saying that it "can not be trusted". It appeared to him that his translations of some difficult passages were based partially on guesswork. However, he also commented that Sumter's introduction was "enthusiastic and well-informed ... spirited and readable".

The style of writing in the translation itself is likewise "spirited and readable" and intended to be in harmony with the Gothic elements in the story. He illustrates his intent in an example passage (where Medardus denounces Euphemie), which he quoted in his introduction:

Know, villain, that even though you believe in your impotent madness that you can dominate me, I hold you chained firmly in my power, as sure as your own damnation. Your wicked game is no more than the frantic writhing of the shackled beast in his cage! Know, villain, that your lover lies crushed and broken in that chasm of which you speak, and that in his place, you now embrace his destroyer. Begone and despair.

— E. T. A. Hoffmann (1815/16) translated by Ian Sumter (2007)

Taylor's, presumably more literal, translation is:

O wretched woman, that I, whom you thought to be in the grip of your impotent delusion, hold you as well as fate itself chained in my power. Your wanton sport is nothing but the convulsive writhing of a captive beast in its cage. Learn, O wretched woman, that your lover lies shattered in that gorge, and that in his stead you have been embracing the spirit of vengeance itself. Go, and grovel in the dust!

— E. T. A. Hoffmann (1815/16) translated by Ronald Taylor (1963)

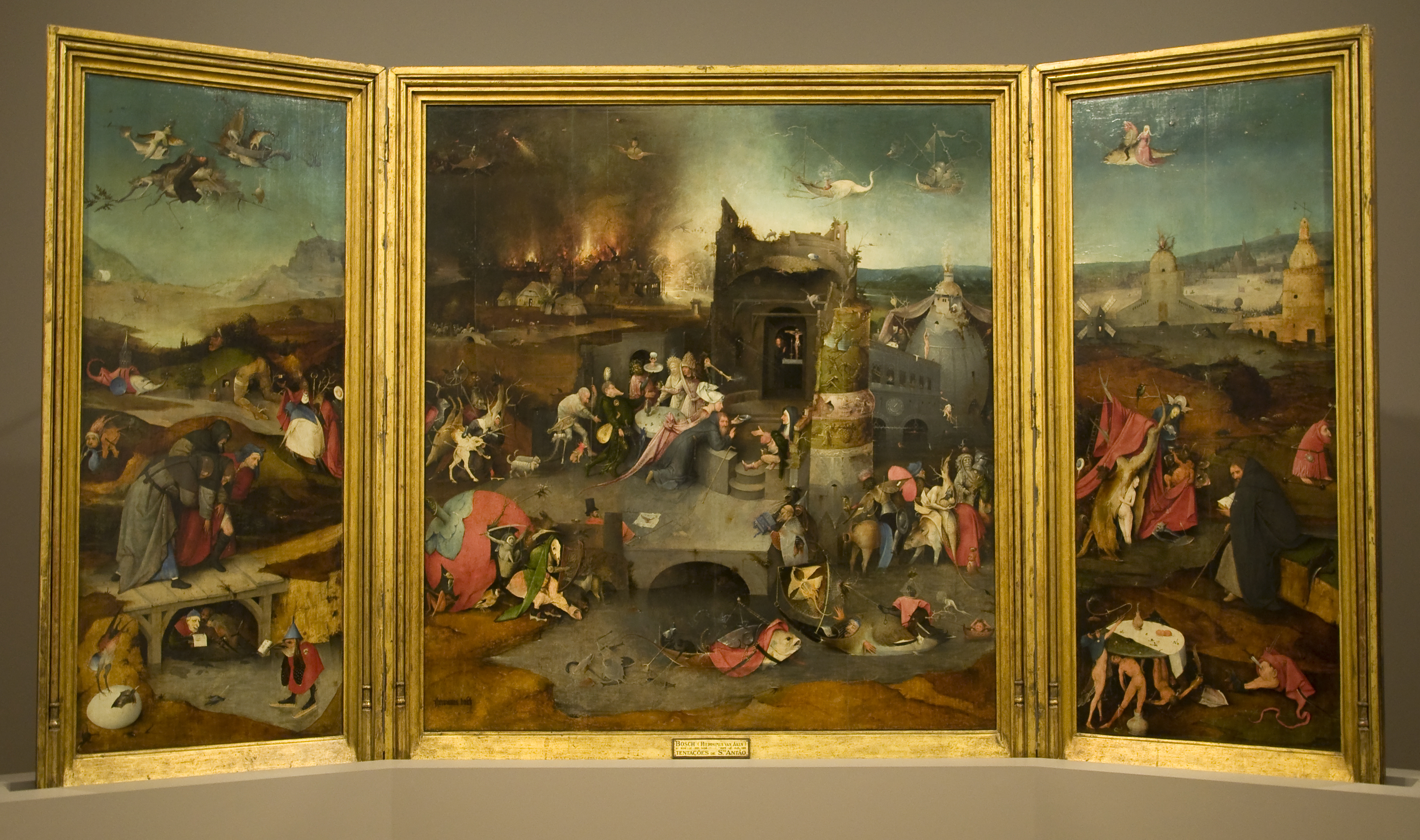
Triptych of the Temptation of Saint Anthony by Hieronymus Bosch, circa 1500. Details from this Triptych were used as cover art for Ian Sumter's translation of The Devil's Elixirs.

Sumter's style seems more modern than Taylors as in "Your wicked game" versus "Your wanton sport" and "in his place" versus "in his stead".

The book cover includes details from the Triptych of the Temptation of St. Anthony by (or after) Hieronymus Bosch consistent with its gothic themes and with a specific incidence in the story, i.e. a hallucination of Medardus reminiscent of a Bosch painting.

Robertson flagged an apparent failing in all of the available translations; i.e. an overemphasis on Providence by which a Supreme Being guides human affairs for the good – an essentially Christian premise. He considered that they misunderstood the implications of the German word, "verhängnis", which is the ultimate cause of much of the drama in the story. "Verhängnis" is one of several words that denote "fate" but it differs in having a strong implication of "doom". Even Taylor, an otherwise accurate and conscientious translator, makes the mistake of repeatedly translating it as "providence", for example:

I felt as if he knew my inmost thoughts and was offering me the freedom to submit to the providence which ruled over me and which might plunge me, after a moment of ecstasy, into everlasting destruction

— E. T. A. Hoffman (1815/16) translated by Ronald Taylor (1963)

His use of "providence" in this instance is the reverse of its Christian association with benevolence. Furthermore, providence (or fate) is not subject to human will. Robertson ends his paper with this summary:

All three [translators] have tried, whether consciously or not, to soften its sinister, Nemesis-like implications by using the familiar words "fate" and "destiny", or the wholly inappropriate term "providence". They thus tend to foreground the redemption narrative at the expense of the Nemesis narrative.

— Ritchie Robertson (2024)

He considered the latter to be fundamental to Hoffman's terrifying story; i.e. "the supposed conflict between good and evil is in reality orchestrated by a remote power as indifferent to human life as the fate evoked in ancient tragedy".
