= The Chances =

Stage play by John Fletcher

The Chances is a Jacobean era stage play, a comedy written by John Fletcher. It was one of Fletcher's great popular successes, "frequently performed and reprinted in the eighteenth and nineteenth centuries."

The play's Prologue assigns the play to Fletcher alone; since his distinctive pattern of stylistic and textual features is continuous through the play, scholars and critics regard Fletcher's sole authorship as clear and unambiguous.

== Source and date ==
For the plot of his play, Fletcher depended upon Miguel de Cervantes, one of his regular sources; The Chances borrows from La Señora Cornelia, one of the Novelas ejemplares, first published in Spain in 1613 and translated into French in 1615. (Fletcher exploited another of the Novelas for his Love's Pilgrimage.) The play must have originated between this period (scholars dispute Fletcher's knowledge of Spanish) and the dramatist's death in 1625. Current scholarship assigns the play to 1617 (it refers to Jonson's The Devil is an Ass, performed the previous year), as a work staged by the King's Men at the Blackfriars Theatre.

== After 1642 ==
During the years of the English Civil War and the Interregnum when the London theatres were officially closed to full-length plays (1642–60), material from The Chances was extracted to form a droll titled The Landlady, which was later printed by Francis Kirkman in his collection The Wits (1672).

The play was revived early in the Restoration era; Samuel Pepys saw it in 1660, 1661, and 1667. Like many Fletcherian works, the play was adapted during the Restoration; one popular adaptation by George Villiers, 2nd Duke of Buckingham, was first staged in 1682, and was a hit for its star, Charles Hart. David Garrick staged another popular adaptation in 1773. In 1821, Frederick Reynolds staged a musical version of The Chances under the title Don Juan, or The Two Violettas.

== Publication ==
The play was originally published in the first Beaumont and Fletcher folio of 1647, and was included in the second folio of 1679. Adapted versions were printed to accompany Restoration productions: Buckingham's text in 1682, 1692, 1705, 1780, 1791, and after; Garrick's in 1773, 1774, and 1777.

== Synopsis ==
The playwright chose an unusual and rather modern-seeming approach for the opening of this play: in place of the type of exposition common in English Renaissance plays (see The Tempest, Act I scene ii for a famously verbose example), Fletcher forces the audience to piece together the plot through a series of short action scenes. (There are fully eleven scenes in Act I.)

The play is set in Bologna. The opening scene introduces Don John and Don Frederick, two Spanish gentlemen visiting the city; they have come to view a famous beauty, but so far without success. The two friends agree to meet on the city's high street at evening – but when the time comes they manage to miss each other. As the city's other houses are being shut up for the night, John sees one that remains open and well-lit; curious, he looks in, and is confronted by a woman who thrusts a mysterious bundle into his arms. He leaves with the bundle, naively hoping that it contains a treasure of gold and jewels; instead he finds that it encloses...a baby. He takes the infant back to his lodgings; his landlady is outraged, assuming that he has brought home his own bastard. With a gift of a bottle of wine and the application of its contents, the landlady is mollified, and she agrees to find care and a wet-nurse for the child. Don John leaves, once again in search of his friend.

Don Frederick, meanwhile, is still out in the city's streets, looking for Don John. A strange woman accosts him, mistaking him for the man she hopes to meet; when she discovers her error, she appeals to his sense of honour to protect her and guide her to safety. Being an honourable fellow, Frederick agrees, and takes her back to his lodging. (The woman turns out to be Costantia, the famous beauty they came to see.) The streets clearly are not safe; two bands of armed men are prowling the city. One is led by the Duke of Ferrara, the man Costantia was expecting to meet; the other is led by Petrucchio, the governor of Bologna and Costantia's brother. The parties meet, and fight; Don John stumbles upon the Duke as he is beset by Petrucchio and his men. Offended by the unfair odds, John draws his sword, fights on the Duke's side, and drives off the attackers, wounding Petrucchio's kinsman Antonio.

It is gradually revealed that Petrucchio is looking for revenge against the Duke for seducing and impregnating his sister Costantia; the mystery baby is their son. John and Frederick are caught up in the affair – but they manage to ascertain that the Duke and Costantia are pre-contracted to marry, which palliates Petrucchio's offended honour. Further complications ensue, however. Costantia confesses her situation to the landlady, and the two women realise that the mystery baby is her son; the landlady takes Costantia to see the baby – which means that both are missing when John and Frederick return. The two friends overhear a young musician named Francisco talking about a woman named Costantia, and they assume he means the Costantia they know – which leads them to doubt the woman's truthfulness and chastity. The situation causes the two friends to begin to suspect each other, and Petrucchio and the Duke to suspect them in turn. The muddle is eventually straightened out, when the four men track down this Costantia and learn that she is another woman of the same name – she is Antonio's courtezan, who has robbed him of gold and jewels, expecting him to die of his wounds.

The four men are still seeking the aristocratic Costantia; they consult a scholar who has a reputation for conjuring devils and using them to find hidden things and people. The four witness a display of ersatz magic that evokes Costantia and the baby; in the end they learn that the conjuring was staged, and all the parties are re-united for a happy ending.

== Modern performances ==
The Chances received a rare twentieth-century production in 1962, when it was staged by Laurence Olivier at the Chichester Festival Theatre.
