= Wilhelm Heinrich Wackenroder =

German writer and jurist (1773–1798)

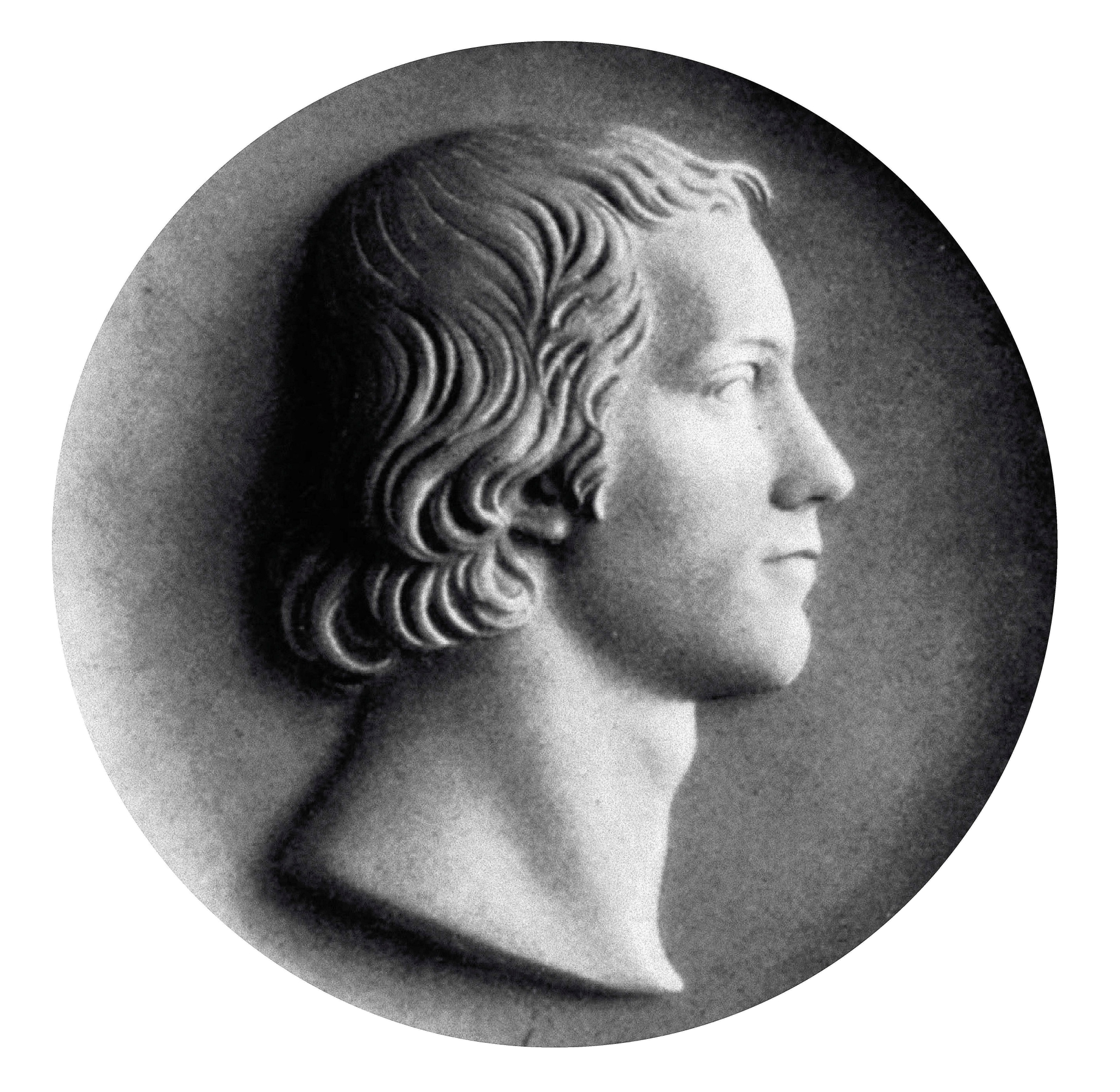
Wilhelm Heinrich Wackenroder

Wilhelm Heinrich Wackenroder (13 July 1773 – 13 February 1798) was a German jurist and writer. With Ludwig Tieck and the Schlegel brothers, he co-founded German Romanticism.

== Life ==
Wackenroder was born in Berlin. He was a close friend of Tieck from youth until his early death. They collaborated on virtually everything they wrote in this period. Wackenroder probably made substantial contributions to Tieck's novel Franz Sternbalds Wanderungen (Franz Sternbald’s Wanderings, 1798), and Tieck to Wackenroder's influential collection of essays, Herzensergießungen eines kunstliebenden Klosterbruders (Outpourings of an Art-Loving Friar, 1797). Outpourings is a tribute to Renaissance and medieval literature and art, attributing to them a sense of emotion Wackenroder and Tieck felt was missing in German Enlightenment thought. It was also the first work to claim for Northern Renaissance art a status equivalent to that of the Italian Renaissance, at least in the case of Albrecht Dürer. The Outpourings have been accorded a status in Germany akin to that of Lyrical Ballads in England, i.e. as the first work of the Romantic movement.

Wackenroder died in Berlin in 1798 at the age of 24 of a case of typhoid fever.

== Bibliography ==
- Robson-Scott, William Douglas (1955). "Wackenroder and the Middle Ages". Modern Language Review. 50 (2): 156–167. doi:10.2307/3718329. JSTOR 3718329.
- Scher, Steven Paul (1976). "Temporality and Mediation: WH Wackenroder and ETA Hoffmann as Literary Historicists of Music". Journal of English and Germanic Philology. 75 (4): 492–502. JSTOR 27708080.
- Spencer, Tom (2015). "Revelation andKunstreligion in W.H. Wackenroder and Ludwig Tieck". Monatshefte / Monthly issues. 107 (1). University of Wisconsin Press: 26–45. doi:10.3368/m.107.1.26. ISSN 0026-9271.
- Kertz-Welzel, Alexandra (2001). Die Transzendenz der Gefühle: Beziehungen zwischen Musik und Gefühl bei Wackenroder/Tieck und die Musikästhetik der Romantik (Ph.D. Dissertation). Saarbrücker Beiträge zur Literaturwissenschaft (in German). Vol. 71. St. Ingbert, Germany: Röhrig Universitätsverlag. ISBN 3-86110-278-1.
