= William Lovell =

1795–1796 novel by Ludwig Tieck

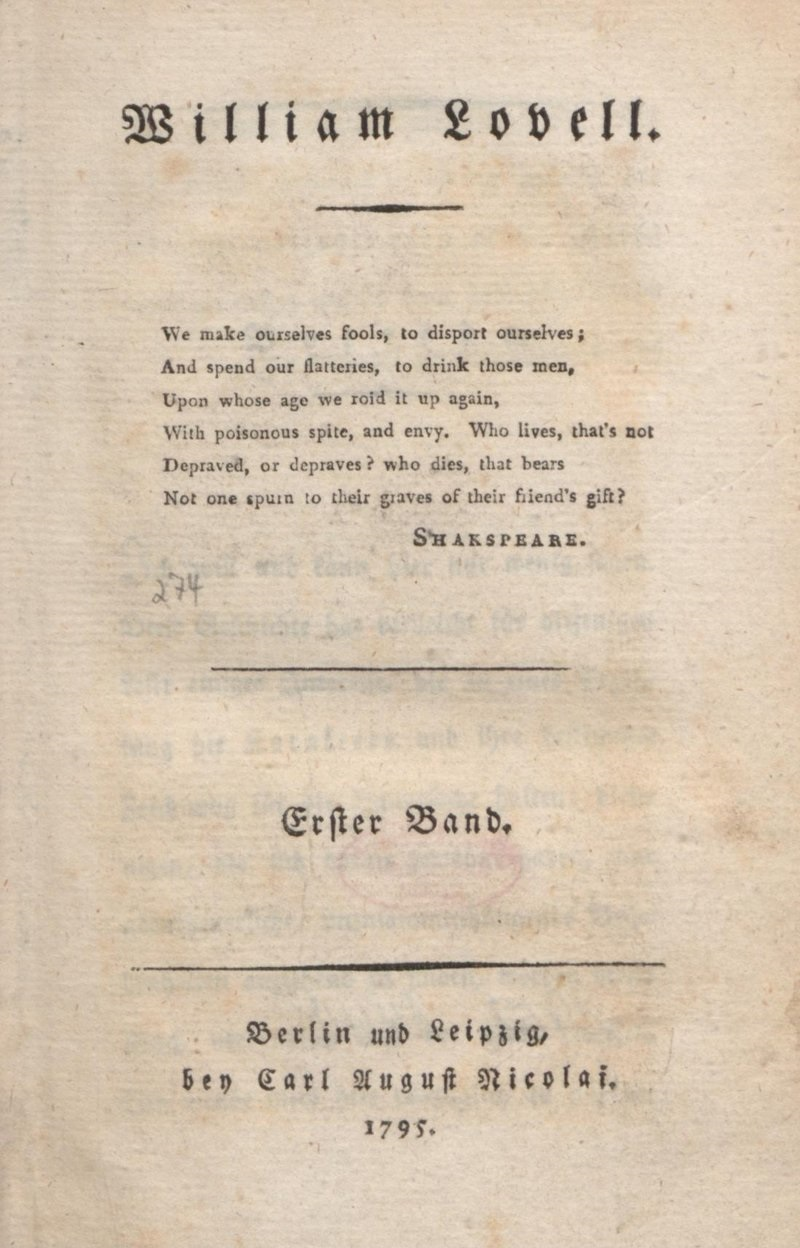
- Title page of the first volume
- Author: Ludwig Tieck
- Language: German
- Publisher: Carl August Nicolai
- Publication date: 1795–1796
- Publication place: Holy Roman Empire
- Pages: 1276

William Lovell is a novel by the German writer Ludwig Tieck, published anonymously in three volumes in 1795–1796. It is an epistolary novel that follows the self-destructive intellectual development of a young Englishman who travels in Europe.

Tieck conceived William Lovell while he was a student of English literature. He was initially inspired to write the story by The New Inn by Ben Jonson and was greatly influenced by the narrative technique and several episodes in The Perverted Peasant by Nicolas Restif de la Bretonne. The story is not autobiographical, but Lovell's ideas and worldview are close to Tieck's and inspired by Enlightenment thinking.
