= Love's Pilgrimage (play) =

Stage play by Francis Beaumont and John Fletcher

Love's Pilgrimage is a Jacobean era stage play, a tragicomedy by Francis Beaumont and John Fletcher. The play is unusual in their canon, in that its opening scene contains material from Ben Jonson's 1629 comedy The New Inn.

== The problem ==
The common materials are Love's Pilgrimage, Act I, scene i, lines 25-63 and 330–411, and The New Inn, II, v, 48-73 and III, i, 57-93 and 130–68. Early researchers like F. G. Fleay and Robert Boyle thought that the Jonsonian material in Love's Pilgrimage was authorial – that Jonson was one of the creators of the play. Modern critics favor the view that the common material, original with Jonson, was interpolated into Love's Pilgrimage during a revision, perhaps for a new production in 1635. (The office book of Sir Henry Herbert, the Master of the Revels, records a payment of £1 received for renewing the license of the play on 16 September 1635.) It is possible that the revision was done by Jonson himself; but far more probably, it was the work of an anonymous reviser. The latter interpretation was first advanced by Gerard Langbaine in 1691, who claimed that Jonson's work was "stolen" for the play.

== Authorship ==
Apart from the Jonsonian interpolations, the play shows internal evidence of being a fairly typical Beaumont and Fletcher collaboration. Cyrus Hoy, in his survey of authorship questions in the canon of Fletcher and his collaborators, produced this division of shares between the two dramatists:

Beaumont — Act I, scene 1; Act IV; Act V;
Fletcher — Act I, scene 2; Act II, Act III.

The play is thought to have originally been written c. 1615–16, and therefore must have been one of the last plays Beaumont worked on before his 1616 death. Its early performance history is unknown; it was acted by the King's Men for King Charles I and Queen Henrietta Maria at Hampton Court Palace in December 1636.

== Sources ==
The plot of the play derives from Las dos Doncellas, one of the Novelas ejemplares of Miguel de Cervantes, published in Spain in 1613 and in a French translation in 1615. (Fletcher relied on another of the Novelas for his solo play The Chances.) It is thought that the playwrights depended upon the French translation. Love's Pilgrimage was first published in the Beaumont and Fletcher folio of 1647.
