= Der Runenberg =

1802 fairytale by Ludwig Tieck

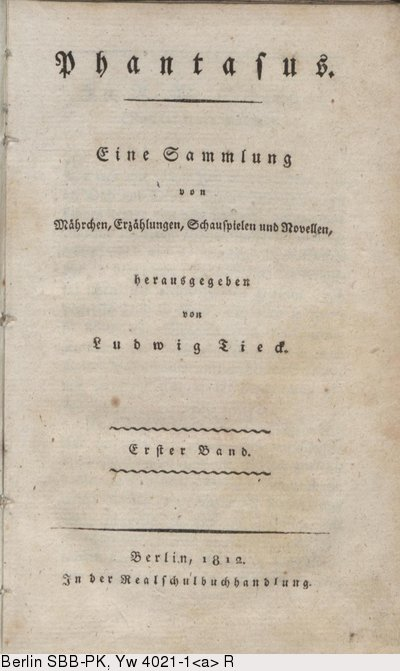
- The title page of Tieck's 1812 collection Phantasus, which featured Der Runenberg.
- Author: Ludwig Tieck
- Language: German
- Genre: Romanticism
- Published: 1804
- Publication place: Germany

Der Runenberg is a fairytale written by German writer, translator, and poet Ludwig Tieck. It was written in 1802 and first published in 1804 in the Taschenbuch für Kunst und Laune. It was later published in the 1812 collection Phantasus. The tale is seen as one of the earliest stories in the literary movement of Romanticism.

== Plot ==
A melancholic hunter named Christian meets a stranger in the mountains. The stranger accompanies Christian for a while, and Christians tells him about his background: Christian's father, a gardener in a castle, is disappointed with him because his son does not share the same interests as him but rather is guided by his longing for the mountains and nature. Christian eventually leaves home and learns how to hunt from an old forester.

After a while, Christian and the stranger part ways. On the advice of the stranger, Christian climbs the "Runenberg", doubtful and afraid but inquisitive. After a while, he finds a window and peers through it; he sees a singing woman undressing. The naked woman hands him a strange tablet with signs drawn on it, set with precious stones. Christian falls asleep.

When he wakes up, he can only vaguely remember what has happened and convinces himself it was a dream. A short time later, he arrives in a small village and is relieved to finally be among people again. At the village church, he meets his future wife, the beautiful Elisabeth. In order to be near Elisabeth, he takes a job as a gardener with her father.

Christian is a hard worker, and, six months later, he marries Elisabeth. The couple are very happy together and soon start a family. After a long time, Christian decides to visit his hometown. On the way, he meets his father at the foot of the fateful Runenberg. He tells Christian that, after his mother died, he became very lonely and thus decided to try to find his son. The two return to Christian's house, and the father becomes part of the family. They live happily oncemore. One day, a stranger comes to the village and stays at Christian's house. After three months, the stranger leaves, leaving behind a large sum of money. Christian is told to take care of it; if the stranger does not return within a year, it is his to keep.

A year passes, and the money becomes Christian's. He increasingly suffers from paranoia—the money has corrupted him, according to his father. He wanders aimlessly until he meets an old woman in the forest. She gives him back the missing tablet, which completely captivates him.

Christian disappears down a mineshaft and is presumed dead. After many years, he returns to his family, who hardly recognize him. In the meantime, his father and parents-in-law have died. Elisabeth has had to remarry due to poverty and has birthed more children. Christian shows his now-impoverished wife a sack of worthless stones, which nonetheless seem valuable to him. He then returns to his forest wife.

== Themes ==
A central theme of the text is that of the Venusberg, which can be seen in Tieck's story Der getreue Eckbart und der Tannhäuser and several other Romantic tales, such as Joseph von Eichendorff's Das Marmorbild. In Der Runenberg, the mountain is inhospitable, a desolate place in which dwells the "supernaturally beautiful woman", a manifestation of Venus. The bleak environment of the mountain is contrasted with the wholesome domestic environment of the fertile, light plain where Christian lives with his family.

Der Runenberg shares many themes with Tieck's 1797 story Der blonde Eckbert—both stories feature a "Waldweib", a "woman of the woods"; this manifests itself in Der Runenberg in the Venus-like figure which Christian encounters and in Der blonde Eckbert as the woman with whom Bertha lives in her childhood. In both tales, this woman possesses supernatural qualities and is capable of transforming into different forms; in Der Runenberg, it can be argued that the Venus-like woman, the stranger who brings Christian gold, and the ugly Waldweib are all manifestations of the same being.
