= The Fair Eckbert =

1797 fairy tale by Ludwig Tieck

- Short story by Ludwig Tieck
- Original title: Der blonde Eckbert
- Country: Prussia
- Language: German
- Genres: Romanticism, Fairy Tale

Publication
- Published in: Volksmärchen
- Publisher: Friedrich Nicolai
- Publication date: 1797
- Published in English: 1823

"The Fair Eckbert" (German: Der blonde Eckbert) is a Romantic fairy tale written by Ludwig Tieck at the end of the eighteenth century. It first appeared in 1797 in a collected volume of folktales published by Tieck under the publisher Friedrich Nicolai in Berlin. For some literary scholars and historians, the publication of Eckbert represents the beginning of a specifically German romantic movement.

== Plot summary ==
Eckbert lives an idyllic life, secluded in a castle deep within a forest in the Harz Mountains, with his wife Bertha. The two find happiness in their refuge away from the corrupting influences of society. They have no children but enjoy life together. Phillip Walther, Eckbert's one contact with society, shatters this harmony during a visit at the outset of the story. Walther had become a close friend of Eckbert over the years as the two frequently rode about Eckbert's demesne. Eckbert feels compelled to share his secret with Walther as his only confidant. He invites Walther to stay the night and enjoy familiarities and dine with Bertha. She reveals the secret of her childhood and begins the frame story.

Bertha escaped from a life of hunger, poverty and abuse at a young age. She found herself at the center of fights between her mother and father. She ran away from their pastoral home, begged on the streets, and made her way into the woods. An old woman took Bertha to a cabin and taught her to weave, spin, and read as they live together with the old woman's animals—a dog and a magical bird. The anthropomorphic bird sings a variety of songs encased by the concept of Waldeinsamkeit, the feeling of being alone in the forest, and the bird lays a precious stone each day. The birds songs always begin and end with Waldeinsamkeit. For instance:

"Waldeinsamkeit,
Mich wieder freut,
Mir geschieht kein Leid,
Hier wohnt kein Neid,
Von neuem mich freut,
Waldeinsamkeit"

Bertha and the old woman find this arrangement pleasing, but Bertha yearns to meet a knight from the stories she has read. After six years of living with the old woman, Bertha steals a bag of precious stones and departs the home, taking the bird with her. As she runs away, she realises that the old woman and the dog won't be able to survive without her. She regrets her decision and wants to head back, but then she comes across her childhood village. She finds out about her parents deaths, and decides to head to the city instead of back to the old woman. She rents a house and gets a housekeeper, but she feels threatened by the fact that the bird keeps singing louder, about how he misses the forest. The bird terrifies her and she strangles it as she leaves and marries Eckbert. Walther listens to this story, reassures her that he can imagine the bird, and the dog "Strohmian". Walther and Bertha retire to bed while Eckbert worries whether his familiarity with Walther and the story will compromise him.

Bertha becomes ill and lies dying a short time after confessing her sins to Walther. Eckbert suspects Walther may be to blame for Bertha's condition. He believes Walther may have been secretly planning for the death of Bertha. His paranoia and suspicions grow more intense after he realized that Walther revealed the name of Bertha's dog, Strohmian, when she never mentioned it during the story. Eckbert encounters Walther in the woods while on a ride and shoots his friend. Eckbert returns home to find his wife as she dies from a guilty conscience.

After the death of his wife and friend, Eckbert finds solace in frequent excursions from his home and befriends a knight named Hugo. Eckbert suffers from a guilty conscience after witnessing his wife's death and murdering his friend. He becomes paranoid and increasingly finds it difficult to disentangle the perception of reality with his imagination. Hugo appears to be his murdered friend Walter and he suspects that Hugo may not be his friend and reveals the secret of Walther's murder. Eckbert fearfully flees into the forest and stumbles upon the place where the old woman found Bertha as a little girl and led her through the forest. He hears a dog barking. He recognizes the sound of the wondrous bird singing. Eventually he meets the old woman who immediately recognizes him. She curses him for Bertha's theft and abrupt departure. The old woman tells Eckbert that she was Walther and Hugo, at the same time, and that he and Bertha are half-siblings from the same noble father. Bertha had been sent away from home to live with a shepherd. This news of his incestuous relationship deeply affects Eckbert's already weakened constitution. He quickly descends into paranoia, delusion, and madness shrieking in agony before he dies.

== Interpretation of Romantic themes ==
Rousseau's ideas about the corruption of bourgeois society begins the story. Eckbert and his wife find themselves happy in their medieval setting. Although this does not extend to Bertha's Arcadian childhood. Her father, a shepherd, struggled to feed her and beat her forcing her to flee from her pastoral home into the woods. In this way, the short tale also highlights the opposition and ambiguity characteristic of romanticism.

The pathological elements of the Romantic experience all color Tieck's short story. The characters experience a range of physical and psychological problems, including, amnesia, abuse, abandonment, incest, immorality and illness. From the outset, the idea of longing Sehnsucht, or a deep emotional bond through a strong interpersonal relationship, drives the story forward. Eckbert feels the guilt of hiding a secret from his friend Walther. He must confess this secret to strengthen their emotional bond, as Tieck suggested "The soul then feels an irresistible impulse to impart itself completely, and reveal its innermost self to the friend, in order to make him so much the more a friend." Eckbert and his wife commit immoral acts and experience retribution for their actions.

Nature's power and the supernatural shape many different elements of the book. Supernatural elements play a role in the main antagonist. The old woman in the woods owns a powerful, gem-laying bird and performs magical acts such as transforming into multiple people. The haunting of Eckbert by this old woman, a revenant from Bertha's past, demonstrates her supernatural qualities. Repetition of the phrase Waldeinsamkeit reinforces the terror of the supernatural within the forest. Eckbert loses his friend in the forest and loses his mind. Here two levels of reality are contrasted, the usual and the supernatural.

Eckbert, Walther, and Bertha all experience a fall characteristic of romanticism as described by M. H. Abrams The Mirror and the Lamp. These characters experience no redemption but only damnation.

Lastly, the frame story and the cyclical nature of the plot follow romantic conventions. Eckbert's life and the story end at the cabin in the woods with the old woman where Bertha's frame story began.

== Translations ==
The tale has been translated into English a number of times:

- "Auburn Egbert" anonymously in Popular Tales and Romances of the Northern Nations (1823)
- "Auburn Egbert" by Thomas Roscoe in The German Novelists (1826)
- "The Fair-Haired Eckbert" by Thomas Carlyle in Tales by Musaeus, Tieck, Richter (1827)
- "The White Egbert" in Julius Hare and James Anthony Froude's Tales from the "Phantasus," etc. of Ludwig Tieck (1845)
- "The Fair-Haired Egbert: A Tale" by Agnes Burette in Christmas Eve; or Tales for Youth (1849)
- "Fair Eckbert" by Paul B. Thomas in The German Classics of the Nineteenth and Twentieth Centuries (1913)
- "Fair-Haired Eckbert" by Thomas Carlyle, revised by Robert M. Browning and Frank G. Ryder in German Literary Fairy Tales (1983)

Comparing the first four translations, academic Edwin Zeydel considered Carlyle's to be by far the best, which "stands head and shoulders above his predecessors" and "towers even higher" above Hare and Froude. He considered Roscoe's and the Popular Tales and Romances translations "usually fair", with Roscoe's translation "succinct and to the point, but unable to convey every finesse of meaning", while Popular Tales and Romances "fails to attain literalness, often produces a false effect and is not infrequently inaccurate", "a trifle better" than Hare and Froude's translation, which he considered "poor and inaccurate in both substance and form", and "literally full of errors".

== Influence ==
Tieck's Eckbert fits well within the genre of German romanticism. The character of Bertha has been identified by literary criticism as being based on Tieck's sister Sophie Tieck.
