= The Romance of the Forest =

1791 gothic novel by Ann Radcliffe

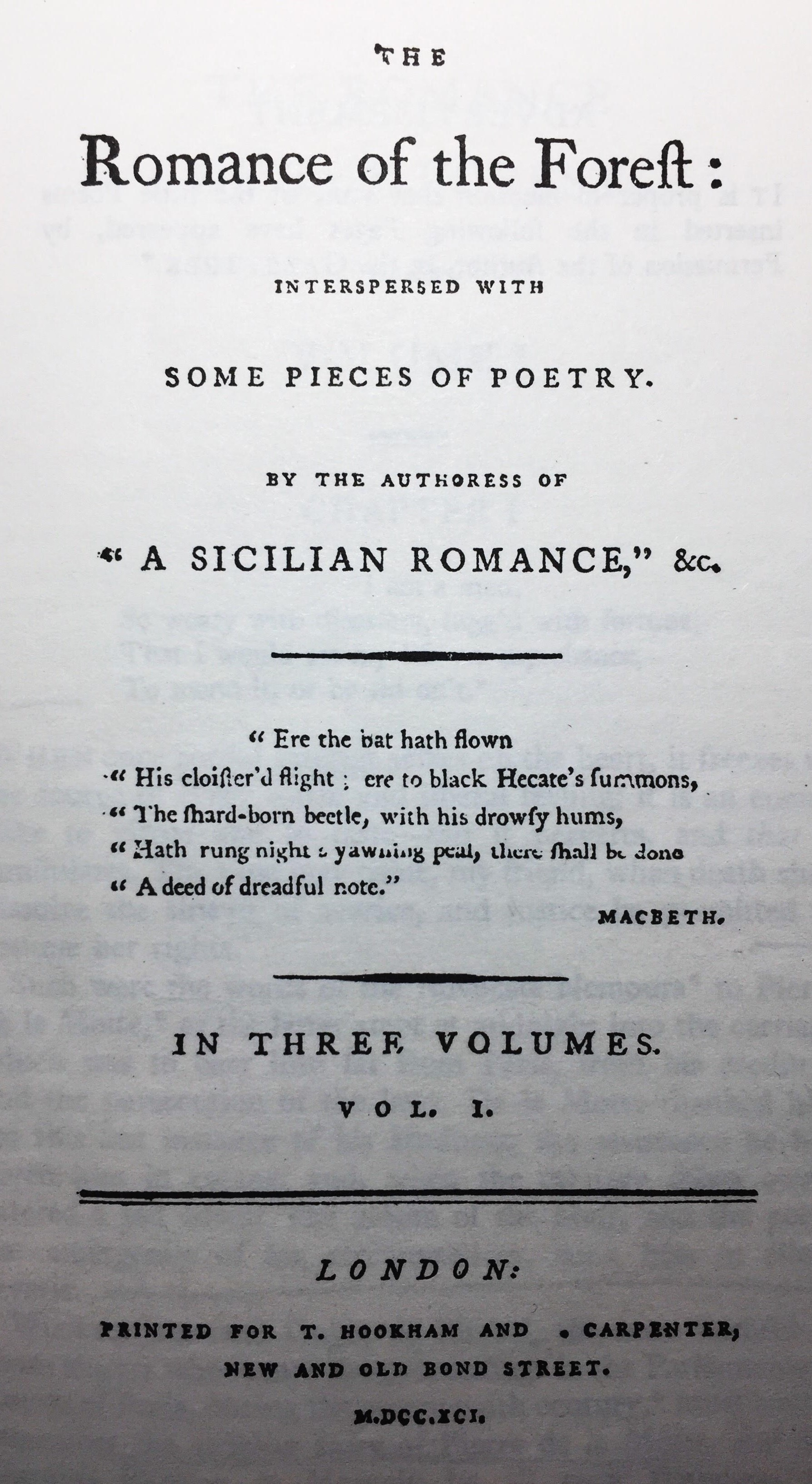
- Title page of first edition
- Author: Ann Radcliffe
- Language: English
- Genre: Gothic fiction Romance; Sentimental fiction Terror
- Publisher: T Hookham and Carpenter
- Publication date: 22 December 1791
- Publication place: United Kingdom
- Media type: Print
- Pages: 3 vols. (first edition)

The Romance of the Forest is a Gothic novel by Ann Radcliffe that was first published in 1791. It combines an air of mystery and suspense with an examination of the tension between hedonism and morality. The novel was her first major success, going through four editions in its first three years, and establishing her reputation as a leading figure in the Gothic romance genre.

== Synopsis ==
Monsieur Pierre de la Motte and his wife, Madame Constance de la Motte, are fleeing Paris in an attempt to escape his creditors. Pierre, Madame, and their two domestic servants, Peter and Annette, are waylaid when the path they’re on becomes too dark to follow any longer. Upon knocking on the door of a small and ancient house, hoping to find assistance, Pierre is admitted into the house by a stranger. He is given a bed and promptly locked in the room. Sometime later, the door to Pierre's room is unlocked and a beautiful young lady, Adeline, is being dragged behind the stranger who admitted Pierre to the house. The stranger states that "if you wish to save your life, swear that you will convey this girl where I may never see her more; or rather consent to take her with you". Upon agreement to take Adeline with him, Pierre and Adeline are conveyed to the carriage by the ruffian stranger.

The family, with the addition of Adeline, proceeds into the darkened interior of a forest, hoping to elude discovery and heeding the warnings of the stranger to not come back on the land they just left. Eventually, they find refuge in a ruined abbey after their wagon wheel breaks. Initially, everyone in the group except Peter is afraid of what lies in waiting behind the abbey walls; however, closer inspection by Peter shows the only inhabitants are mice, owls, bats, and the like. Afraid of being pursued by creditors, the family and Adeline stay close to the abbey. Peter is sent into the town of Auboine for supplies to fix their broken wagon wheel. After returning to the family, Peter confides to Pierre that while he was in town he got in a fight and was unable to procure the necessary supplies for fixing the wheel, but he did purchase some food to tide them over.

The family and the servants settle into the rooms of the abbey, making each one more inhabitable the longer they stay. After some time passes, while in town, Peter comes across a gentleman who inquires about the La Motte family. Thinking the people inquiring about the La Motte family are creditors, the family, Adeline, and the servants all go into hiding through the trap door Pierre has found in one of the bedrooms. They spend the night in the dark and terrifying rooms, where unbeknownst to everyone else, Pierre discovers a skeleton in a chest. The next day, everyone agrees to send Adeline out to check if anyone is at the abbey since she is the only one who would be unrecognisable to creditors. Upon greeting one of her woodland animal friends, a young male stranger approaches her. Soon Adeline discovers that this stranger is actually Pierre and Madame's son, Louis. They left Paris without giving notice to his regiment, and he had come searching for his parents. Soon after, Madame confides to Louis her jealous fears that Adeline seeks to have an affair with her husband. Louis is supposed to find out the truth of where Pierre has been spending his days, but is unable to do so after losing sight of his father in the dense forest. Madame stays hostile to Adeline, believing the worst of her in relation to her supposed affair with Pierre. At the same time, Louis has fallen in love with Adeline and pines for her saying “I should esteem myself most happy, if I could be of service to you.”

Meanwhile, "Louis, by numberless little attentions, testified his growing affection for Adeline, who continued to treat them as passing civilities. It happened, one stormy night, as they were preparing for rest, that they were alarmed by a trampling of horses near the abbey". The riders introduce themselves as the Marquis de Montalt, who is the owner of the abbey, and his attendants, one of which is named Theodore. Pierre becomes more distressed after the appearance of the Marquis. Louis notes this distress, but must soon leave to return to his regiment. Theodore attempts to warn Adeline that he fears she has been deceived and danger is upon her. Before he can formally speak with Adeline, he is sent to return to his regiment as well.

Pierre and the Marquis, at this same time, have been speaking in private to one another. After Theodore's departure, Adeline fears her father will return for her when overhearing a conversation between Pierre and the Marquis. She relates her fears to Pierre, and he allows her to believe that is what the conversation’s subject consisted of. Throughout this time period, as well, Adeline also finds a manuscript written by someone who had been held captive inside the abbey during 1642. The writer of the manuscript relates his dire circumstances and impending death at the hands of an unknown perpetrator. Adeline notes when reading the manuscript that it "is in a barely legible and fragmented condition. It suggests much more than it can say". Adeline ultimately informs Pierre of the manuscript once she reaches particularly terrifying point while reading it.

Adeline is then warned of danger again, this time by Peter. He attempts several times to tell her the issue at hand, until finally he is able to tell her the reality of the conversations between the Marquis and Pierre: The Marquis wants to make Adeline his wife and was discussing the matter with Pierre. However, Adeline discovers through Peter that the Marquis actually already has a wife and she would have really had a "fake marriage" and become the Marquis' mistress. Adeline not wanting to become either the Marquis' wife or mistress, she and Peter concoct a plan to help her escape the abbey. Unfortunately, when making her escape, Adeline is tricked, and instead she is taken to the Marquis’ residence. Adeline soon attempts to escape the Marquis by climbing out the window where she runs into Theodore, who is there to rescue her. The two leave in a carriage and the Marquis quickly follows once he realises what has happened.

Adeline and Theodore stop at an inn where first Theodore's regiment and then the Marquis finds them. Theodore attacks his commanding officer and is injured, he also fights and wounds the Marquis. Now he must face the consequences of deserting his regiment and wounding a superior officer. Prior to all of this commotion, Adeline realises she is in love with Theodore while he is sick. Theodore is imprisoned, and Adeline is returned to Pierre de la Motte at the abbey. The Marquis informs Pierre that he wants to kill Adeline, not marry her, now. Pierre finds that he is "entangled in the web which his own crimes had woven. Being in the power of the Marquis, he knew he must either consent to the commission of a deed, from the enormity of which, depraved as he was, he shrunk in horror; or sacrifice fortune, freedom, probably life itself, to the refusal". Pierre finds he is unable to kill Adeline, and thus he sends Adeline with Peter on horseback to Peter’s sister’s house in Leloncourt.

When Peter and Adeline finally reach Leloncourt, Adeline is taken ill and is nursed to health first by Peter’s sister and later by Clara la Luc. Here, "Adeline, who had long been struggling with fatigue and indisposition, now yielded to their pressure... But, notwithstanding her fatigue, she could not sleep, and her mind, in spite of all her efforts, returned to the scenes that were passed, or presented gloomy and imperfect visions of the future". After her illness, Adeline is essentially adopted by Arnaud la Luc, Clara’s father, and spends the remainder of her time with the family. Clara also has a brother, but he currently is not present. Soon Monsieur la Luc’s health is failing (he is taken with consumption), and the family must relocate to a different climate for a time. Eventually, Louis de la Motte finds Adeline and brings her news of Theodore. He informs her that he is imprisoned, and his death is imminent because of the assault he made on his general officer. Here, Monsieur la Luc finds out that the Theodore in reference is actually his son that he has not seen for many years.

Meanwhile, Monsieur and Madame de la Motte are facing their own troubles. Pierre de la Motte is placed on trial for a robbery he previously committed against the Marquis before he knew who the Marquis was. The Marquis would not have pressed any charges had Pierre assisted the murder of Adeline. Presently, however, Monsieur and Madame de la Motte are in Paris. Pierre is imprisoned and Madame is with him.

Unaware of this, Adeline, Clara, and Monsieur la Luc travel to Paris to be with Theodore prior to his execution. While Pierre is on trial, witnesses come forward, and it is discovered that the Marquis is not who he claims to be; he had previously murdered Adeline's father and stolen his inheritance. Because of these recent developments, Theodore is released from his imprisonment while the Marquis poisons himself, but not before he confesses all his wrongdoings. "It appeared that convinced he had nothing to hope from his trial, he had taken this method of avoiding an ignominious death. In the last hours of his life, while tortured with the remembrance of his crime, he resolved to make all the atonement that remained for him, and having swallowed the potion, he immediately sent for a confessor to take a full confession of his guilt, and two notaries, and thus established Adeline beyond dispute in the rights of her birth, also bequeathing her a considerable legacy".

== Characters ==
- Adeline, the heroine. Initially believed to be the daughter of Louis de St. Pierre; revealed as the only daughter of Henry, Marquis de Montalt.
- Pierre de la Motte, a fugitive from the law. Madame de la Motte's husband and Louis's father.
- Madame de la Motte, Pierre's wife and Louis's mother. Her full name is briefly mentioned as Constance née Valentia.
- Louis de la Motte, an officer in the army. Pierre and Madame de la Motte's son.
- Peter, coachman for the de la Mottes.
- Annette, servant to the de la Mottes.
- Theodore de Peyrou, Adeline's love interest. An officer in the Marquis's regiment. Revealed to be Arnaud la Luc's son.
- Phillipe, Marquis de Montalt, a dissolute nobleman and Adeline's enemy. Murderer of Adeline's father (his half-brother), and owner of the abbey where she takes refuge.
- Arnaud la Luc, a clergyman living at Leloncourt, in Savoy. Clara and Theodore's father.
- Madame la Luc, Arnaud la Luc's sister and housekeeper.
- Clara la Luc, Arnaud la Luc's daughter and Theodore's sister.
- Jacques Martigny, an accomplice of the Marquis.
- Du Bosse, an accomplice of the Marquis.
- Louis de St. Pierre (alias Jean d'Aunoy), an accomplice of the Marquis. Initially thought to be Adeline's father.

== Background ==
In 1765 Horace Walpole published The Castle of Otranto, widely regarded by modern literary historians to be the first occasion of Gothic fiction. A decade later, Clara Reeve wrote The Old English Baron, the first "Gothic" novel to be penned by a woman, and in 1783 Sophia Lee produced The Recess, a story set in the time of Queen Elizabeth I. These works prefigured much of the material and themes that Radcliffe would synthesise in her novels, most particularly ideas of the supernatural, terror, romance, and history.

== Setting ==
The main action in The Romance of the Forest is set in an abandoned, ruined abbey. The building itself serves as a moral lesson, as well as a major setting for the action in the novel. This use of a ruined abbey, drawing on Burke's aesthetic theory of the sublime and the beautiful, establishes it a place of terror and of safety. Burke argued that the sublime was a source of awe or fear brought about by strong emotions, such as terror or mental pain. On the other end of the spectrum was the beautiful, the things that brought pleasure and safety. He argued that the sublime was to be preferred. Related to the concepts of the sublime and the beautiful is the idea of the picturesque, introduced by William Gilpin, which was thought to exist between the two extremes. The picturesque was what continued elements of the sublime and the beautiful, as the natural or uncultivated beauty in a ruin or a partially overgrown building. In The Romance of the Forest Adeline and the La Mottes live in constant fear of discovery by the police or by Adeline's father, and at times certain characters believe the castle to be haunted. Yet it also serves as a comfort, providing characters with shelter and safety. Finally, it is picturesque, in that it serves as a combination of the natural and the human. Thus Radcliffe could use architecture to draw on the aesthetic theories of the time and set the tone of the story in the minds of the reader. As with many buildings in Gothic novels, the abbey also has a series of tunnels. These serve as both a hiding place for characters and a place of secrets. This was mirrored later in the novel with Adeline hiding from the Marquis de Montalt and the secrets of the Marquis, which eventually leads to his downfall and Adeline's salvation.

== Sensibility and sexuality ==
Cynthia Griffin Wolff added insight into the erotic energy cultivated in Radcliffe's The Romance of the Forest. Wolff characterized Marquis as a "demon-lover."

== Publication ==
The novel was published by T. Hooker and J. Carpenter in 1791. It was Radcliffe's third novel, appearing a year after A Sicilian Romance. Due to its popularity, it was reprinted in seventeen editions during Radcliffe's lifetime, and translated into French, Italian, and German.

== Reception ==
The Romance of the Forest was Radcliffe's first true popular success, and established her reputation as a skilled and poetic writer. Eighteenth-century reviewers praised the work for its narrative suspense and for its beautiful descriptions. The literary historian Deborah D. Rogers suggests that the novel's "rave reviews" inspired Radcliffe to put her name on her works for the first name: the first edition title page said only that it was "By the Authoress of 'A Sicilian Romance,' &c", but the second edition changed the attribution to "By Ann Radcliffe, Author of 'A Sicilian Romance, &c'".

The English Review and the Critical Review both described the novel as rating "first" among modern novels in 1792. The Critical Review praised the work's prose style and emotional interest. In particular, the reviewer noted that the novel uses Gothic tropes that had appeared in the more supernatural novels The Old English Baron (1778) and The Castle of Otranto (1764), but improved upon those works by rendering "the ruined abbey, a supposed ghost, the skeleton of a man secretly murdered" with skillful suspense and misdirection so that readers are engrossed while the plot's final resolution remains "within the verge of rational belief".

Although The Critical Review saw it as her finest work, it is not generally regarded in the same league as The Italian and The Mysteries of Udolpho; however, the Romance of the Forest was hugely popular in its day and remains in print after over two hundred years. It is the subject of much critical discussion, particularly in its treatment of femininity and its role and influence in the Gothic tradition Radcliffe did so much to invent. .

== Influence ==
A theatrical adaptation of the novel, Fontainville Forest by James Boaden, was performed in 1794.
