= Supernatural Horror in Literature =

Essay by H. P. Lovecraft

- Author: H. P. Lovecraft
- Language: English
- Genre: Horror fiction
- Published in: The Recluse
- Publication date: 1927
- Publication place: United States
- Media type: Print (magazine)
- Text: Supernatural Horror in Literature at Wikisource

"Supernatural Horror in Literature" is a 28,000-word essay by American writer H. P. Lovecraft, surveying the development and achievements of horror fiction as the field stood in the 1920s and 30s. The essay was researched and written between November 1925 and May 1927, first published in a small-circulation amateur magazine in August 1927, and then revised and expanded during 1933–1934.

== The essay ==
The oldest and strongest emotion of mankind is fear, and the oldest and strongest kind of fear is fear of the unknown.

— H.P. Lovecraft

Lovecraft's meticulously researched essay covers a broad spectrum, attempting to present a comprehensive historical account of horror literature, with insights into the nature, development and history of the weird tale. Beginning with the genre's alchemical and folkloric roots, it continues with tales of diabolism from the Renaissance, the birth of Gothic fiction towards the end of the 18th century and its migration to the "New World" during the 19th, and it ends with an acknowledgement of Lovecraft's most noteworthy contemporaries. As a guide to early Gothic fiction, the author relied partly on Edith Birkhead's 1921 historical work The Tale of Terror, and partly on the expertise of the great many experts and collectors in his circle. The bulk of the essay was written in New York City, where Lovecraft had access not only to the vast resources of the New York Public Library and Brooklyn Public Library, but also to his friends' private collections, that included some rare and obscure works of horror fiction.

After discussing the prehistory of the genre, citing the Anglo-Saxon epic poem Beowulf, and the Elizabethan plays Doctor Faustus, Hamlet and Macbeth, among other works, which seem to possess the same "dæmoniac" atmosphere that later came to define weird fiction, Lovecraft extensively discusses Horace Walpole's Gothic horror classic, The Castle of Otranto (1764), which became so popular, it essentially established the literary horror story. Clara Reeve's The Old English Baron (1777), Ann Radcliffe's The Castles of Athlin and Dunbayne (1789) and The Mysteries of Udolpho (1794), and Charles Brockden Brown's Wieland: or, the Transformation (1798), all followed Walpole's success, contributing each in its own way to the enrichment of the genre. In the section titled "The Apex of Gothic Romance", Lovecraft discusses Matthew Gregory Lewis's very popular novel The Monk (1797) and Charles Maturin's underrated masterpiece Melmoth the Wanderer (1820), which evokes Molière's Dom Juan, Goethe's Faust, and Byron's Manfred. In the following section, titled "The Aftermath of the Gothic", he covers authors whose names are regularly associated with Gothic literature, including William Beckford, Bram Stoker, Mary Shelley, and Emily Brontë. From there, he devotes a section each to the continuation of that literary tradition on the European continent, in the British Isles, and in America. Edgar Allan Poe (whom Lovecraft considers a pioneer of the horror tale and a great aesthete) gets a whole section dedicated to himself. Special mention is made of Washington Irving, Nathaniel Hawthorne, Henry James, Rudyard Kipling, Robert Louis Stevenson, Guy de Maupassant, Ambrose Bierce, and Arthur Conan Doyle, accompanied by Lovecraft's own opinions and insights in their work. Lovecraft concludes his essay with an in-depth discussion of his contemporaries, including Arthur Machen, Algernon Blackwood, Lord Dunsany, and M. R. James, who he considers the four "modern masters" of the genre.

== Publication history ==
The text was first published in August 1927 in the one-issue magazine The Recluse, and copies were widely circulated. In 1933–35 was partly republished in revised serial form in The Fantasy Fan. The full revised text first became easily available to the public in The Outsider and Others (1939).

== Critical reception ==
An H. P. Lovecraft Encyclopedia terms the work "HPL's most significant literary essay and one of the finest historical analyses of horror literature." After the first publication, the critic Edmund Wilson, who was not an admirer of Lovecraft's fiction, praised the recent essay as a "really able piece of work... he had read comprehensively in this field—he was strong on the Gothic novelists—and writes about it with much intelligence". David G. Hartwell has called "Supernatural Horror in Literature" "the most important essay on horror literature".
