= St. Alban's Abbey, A Metrical Tale =

1826 Gothic poem by Ann Radcliffe

St. Alban's Abbey
- by Ann Radcliffe
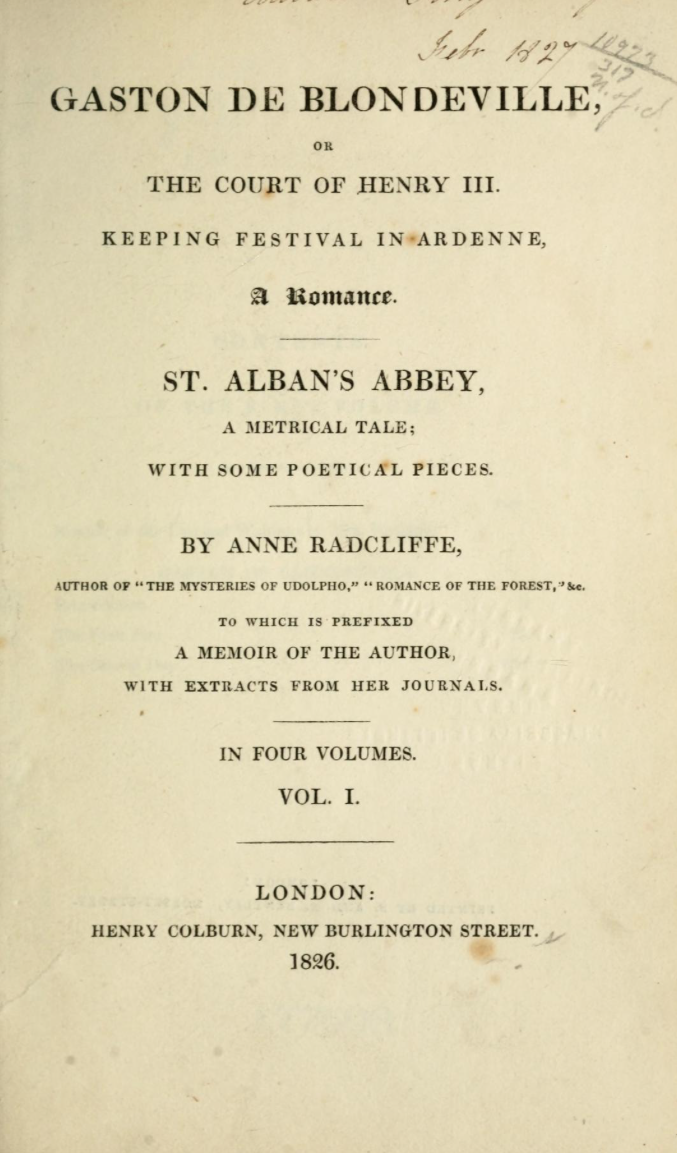
- Title page of the 1826 collection of Ann Radcliffe's posthumous works
- Written: 1808-9
- Meter: iambic tetrameter
- Rhyme scheme: variable; primarily couplets
- Publication date: 1826

St. Alban's Abbey, A Metrical Tale is a poem by Ann Radcliffe, likely composed between 1808 and 1809, and first published posthumously in 1826. It is Radcliffe's longest poem, and is followed by extensive antiquarian footnotes, which link the poem's events and scenes to artifacts Radcliffe saw on historical sightseeing trips to St Albans Abbey.

In the frame story, the poem's narrator gazes on the ruins of the abbey and imagines how the building's occupants experienced the First Battle of St. Alban's in 1455. One of the poem's ten cantos describes the battle itself, while the others describe the anxious preparations at the abbey and the sad aftermath. The hero of the poem, a fictional Lancastrian named Baron Fitz-Harding, hides from Richard of York in the abbey and thus cannot be found by his wife or father, both of whom fear he has been killed; he also fears that his father has been killed, and they all search for each other among the wounded and dead. The poem ends with their bittersweet reunion and the capture of Henry VI.

Reviews of Radcliffe's posthumous works had limited praise for the poem. A few particularly emotional scenes attracted positive comment, but several reviewers considered the overall poem too long and poorly crafted. More modern analysis of Radcliffe's works tends to overlook the poem entirely, and modern biographers of Radcliffe have dismissed it as an over-long and poorly-crafted work which is not representative of Radcliffe's literary skills.

== Synopsis ==
The poem is prefaced with an apostrophe invoking the "Spirit of ancient days" as a Muse. This forms part of a frame narrative, in which the poet visits St Albans Abbey in the early nineteenth century and imagines how it was lived in hundreds of years ago. The main narrative of the poem is set at the beginning of the Wars of the Roses, at the time of the 1455 First Battle of St. Alban's. Canto I, "The Abbey", describes the abbey's physical buildings in the eighteenth century as a mix of historical and modern features and invites the reader to imagine how it was used in the distant past, emphasizing the abbey's role as an intellectual and social hub of its community.

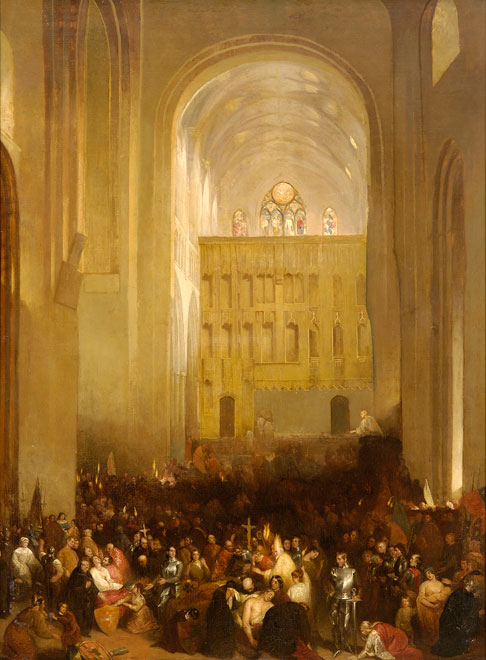
Nineteenth-century painting by Henry Hawkins: St. Alban's Cathedral full of the wounded after another battle in the Wars of the Roses, the Battle of Barnet

The narrative begins in Canto II, "The Night Before the First Battle", in which monks and knights nervously anticipate the next day. The poem's hero is a fictional Lancastrian, Baron Fitz-Harding. In addition to military scenes, the poem describes how the monks at the Abbey care for the wounded, and follows Fitz-Harding's wife Lady Florence on a dangerous journey in disguise to find her husband. Canto III is "The Day of the First Battle"; Canto IV, "The Hour After the Battle"; Cantos V and VI are "The Evening After the Battle", set outside the castle's walls and within the town and abbey, respectively.

In Canto VII, "Scene in the Monastery", Fitz-Harding secretly takes shelter in the abbey buildings at night while Richard of York seeks him. He travels through the abbey's buildings disguised as a monk in Canto VIII, "Solemn Watch Within the Abbey", seeking his father among the wounded and dead, without success. In Canto IX, "Among the Dead", Fitz-Harding watches other mourners arrive with the dawn, including his wife Lady Florence looking for him in her own disguise. They reunite, in Canto X, also titled "Among the Dead", the two find Fitz-Harding's father alive. The narrative ends with Richard's capture of Henry VI. The poem concludes with the narrator's farewell to the "Norman shade" (i.e., the ghost of the abbey) which had temporarily animated the abbey buildings with the story of its past.

== Style ==
Just where nave, choir, and transept met,
And Death with splendour was beset,
Fitzharding stood and looked below
O'er all the scene of varied woe.
And thus it lay beneath his sight—
The western aisles were stretched in night,
Save the shrined transept's rays
Threw the full splendour of its blaze
'Thwart the choir-steps and 'slant the nave.
There, every altar-tomb and grave,
As that long line of glory fell,
Showed its dead warrior, all too well.

— Ann Radcliffe, St. Alban's Abbey, canto VIII, stanza XXII

St. Alban's Abbey is Radcliffe's longest poem, running to more than three hundred pages in its first edition. All of Radcliffe's previous poetry consisted of short poems inserted into her novels, ostensibly written by her characters. Its stanzas, which vary in length, are grouped into ten cantos. There is no consistent rhyme scheme, though it tends toward heroic couplets. The narrative pacing is influenced by Walter Scott's new and popular historical fiction; as in his writing, St. Alban's Abbey moves frequently between scenes of simultaneous events that make up multiple interconnected storylines. After the poem, Radcliffe includes 61 pages of endnotes that contextualize its fiction through an antiquarian historical lens. These notes include information gathered from her historical sightseeing trips, as recorded in her journal at the time.

== Composition and publication ==
Ann Radcliffe was a successful writer of Gothic novels, gaining fame for a series of five novels published between 1789 and 1797. These novels were set outside of England in the historical past, and featured vulnerable young women under threat. Radcliffe was one of the most popular and highly-paid novelists of her day, until she ceased publishing after 1797 to live privately the rest of her life.

According to Radcliffe's biographer Rictor Norton, St. Alban's Abbey was most likely composed in 1808 to 1809. The poem's setting was inspired by Radcliffe's sightseeing trips with her husband in the south of England, especially her exploration of the cathedral for which the poem is named. They visited St. Alban's several times, including trips in 1802 and 1808. On the latter visit, they were shown a helmet which appears in the poem as the "golden damasked helmet" belonging to the hero's father.

Nineteenth-century rumours suggest that Radcliffe intended to publish the poem and began negotiations with a publisher, but withdrew it from publication due to ill health. These reports, published in 1824 and 1826, don't mention a specific date for the potential publication, saying only that it was planned "some years ago". Ultimately, like everything Radcliffe wrote after her enormously successful final novel The Italian (1797), St. Alban's Abbey was not published until after her death in 1823. The poem formed part of a four-volume collection of posthumous works published in 1826. The collection was published by Henry Colburn and included a biography of Radcliffe by Thomas Noon Talfourd. The title page of the first volume reads: Gaston de Blondeville, or The Court of Henry III. Keeping Festival in Ardenne, A Romance. St. Alban's Abbey, A Metrical Tale; With Some Poetical Pieces. By Anne Radcliffe, Author of "The Mysteries of Udolpho", "Romance of the Forest", &c. To Which is Prefixed a Memoir of the Author, With Extracts from Her Journals. The poem was split across volumes three and four of the set. The internal title page for the poem itself gives it the subtitle A Political Romance, rather than A Metrical Tale.

== Analysis ==
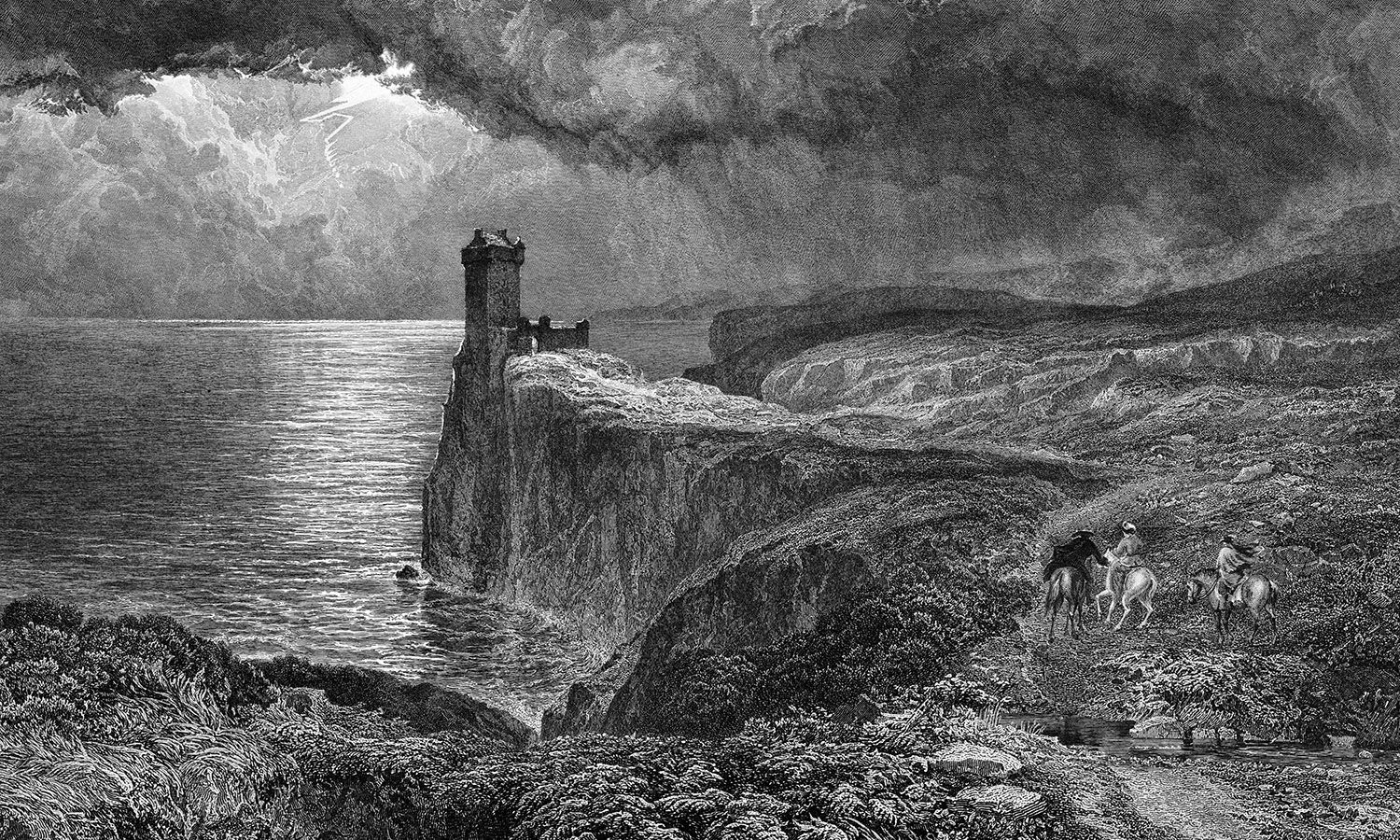
The ruins of Wolf's Crag castle in Walter Scott's The Bride of Lammermoor (1819). Engraving by W. Forrest, based on a painting by Samuel Bough

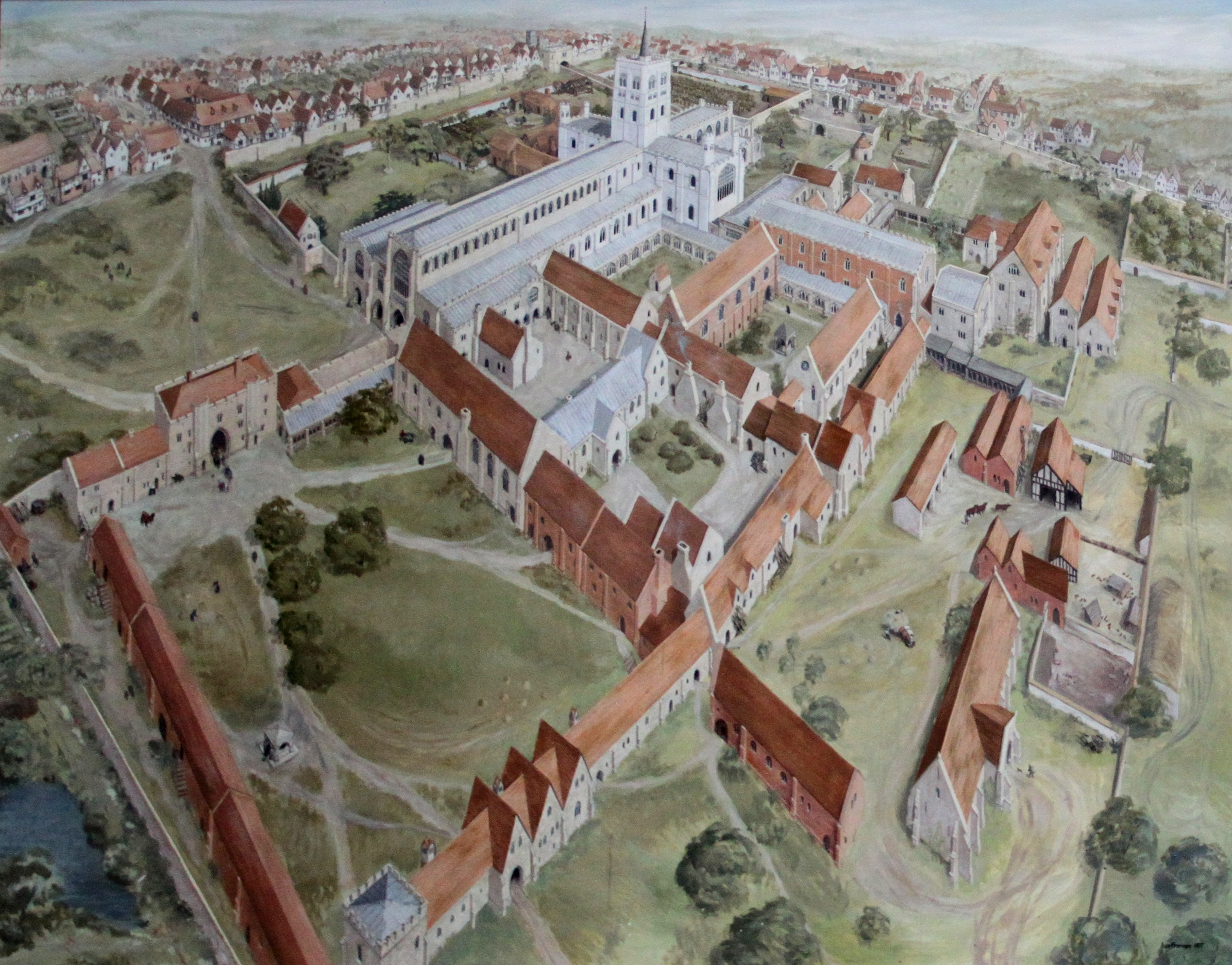
Illustration showing the extent of St Albans Abbey before dissolution

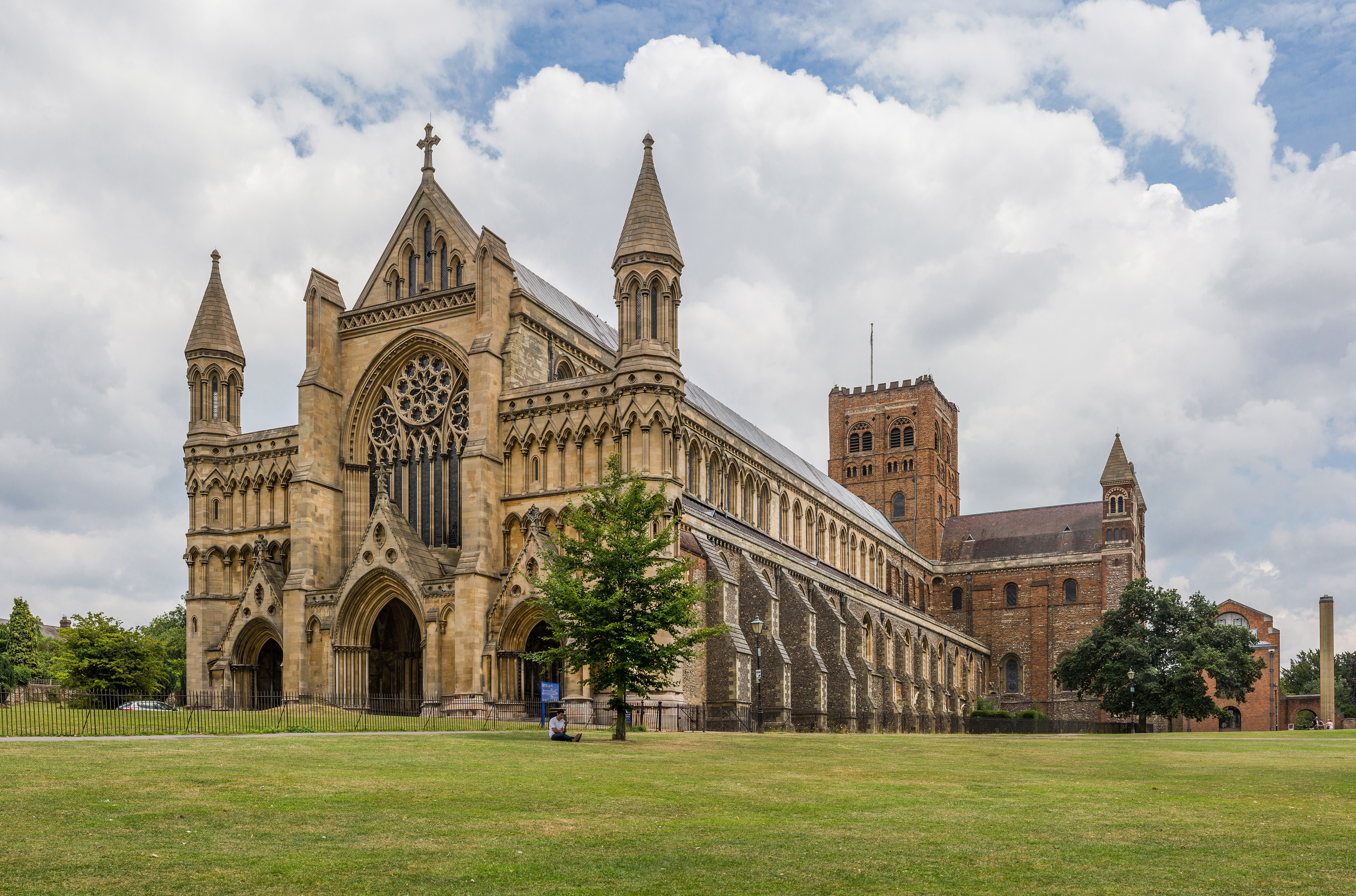
St Albans Cathedral in 2014

=== Castle ruins ===
Extensive description of the castle environment is one of the main subjects of St. Alban's Abbey. Gothic architecture, in the eighteenth century, was considered a "national style" representing England's cultural heritage. Castle ruins were a common subject for literature about Britain's history. At the time, historical fiction (especially Walter Scott's) tended to present history as a linear narrative of progress, with war as a natural part of that progress. This framing downplayed the consequences of violence, and promoted nationalist ideals. Other Gothic literature also sometimes downplayed the violence of war by depicting castle ruins solely as aesthetically beautiful objects, disconnected from their military history. In contrast to both the historical and Gothic traditions, Radcliffe's poem emphasizes the feudal violence that has shaped British history. She also depicts St. Alban's Abbey as a ruined monastery joined to a thriving, "unruined" cathedral which remained in use in the present—a setting which cannot be simply relegated to a mythological past. The poem as a whole presents an unresolved tension between nostalgically longing for a lost heroic past, and ironically accepting that returning to the past is impossible.

Two poems published by Walter Scott before Radcliffe wrote St. Alban's Abbey, namely The Lay of the Last Minstrel (1805) and Marmion (1808), feature important ancient structures. Scott often cited Radcliffe's novels as an inspiration for his writing, though one which he revises though a greater focus on historical realism rather than supernatural elements; the literary historian Elizabeth Bobbitt argues that St. Alban's Abbey can be read as Radcliffe's private response to Scott's innovations with her Gothic genre.

Another emerging discourse around castle ruins in the period concerned historical preservation, especially expressed in criticism of modern "improvements" of ancient buildings. Radcliffe's poem evokes this debate with its opening, which describes how difficult it is for contemporary visitors to imagine the original use of the building.

=== Gothic, Romantic, and antiquarian depictions of history ===
The aesthetics of the poem diverge from most of Radcliffe's previous writing. Radcliffe's early prose writing used historical settings, especially castles, as part of a suspenseful, sensationalist writing style known as the Gothic. Other Gothic novelists in the 1790s, known as the "Radcliffe school" due to her influence, frequently used similar settings; some added supernatural plot elements or violence to intensify the suspense and sensationalism.

Meanwhile, poetic writing of the Romantic school depicted historical castles, especially ruined ones, to convey picturesque or a sublime encounter with the past. As the eighteenth century turned to the nineteenth, this Romantic aesthetic increasingly displaced the Gothic.

An antiquarian approach to the past also began to gain prominence. Radcliffe's antiquarian approach was influenced by Thomas Warton, as well as Richard Hurd's Letters of Chivalry and Romance (1762), James Macpherson's The Works of Ossian (1765), Thomas Percy's Reliques of Ancient English Poetry (1765), and Paul-Henri Mallet's Northern Antiquities (1770). The poem's subplot about Lady Florence may have been inspired by a fraudulent "medieval" poem by Thomas Chatterton, "Elinour and Juga", which featured two Yorkist women who travel to St. Alban's in search of their husbands and discover that they have been slain.

In this context, St. Alban's Abbey reflects a change of course in Radcliffe's career. She uses poetry rather than prose fiction, and presents her archetypically Gothic setting in both a Romantic and an antiquarian light. Antiquarian elements include precise, technical descriptions of the castle architecture, and objects for which Radcliffe had seen real historical exemplars. Radcliffe's footnotes also demonstrate her antiquarian approach.

== Reception ==
The 1826 publication of Radcliffe's posthumous works received five reviews at its release, which all commented on St. Albans Abbey. The reception was generally not positive, and the poem was soon forgotten.

Unreserved praise for the poem came from a review in The New Monthly Magazine. This anonymous review may have been written by Thomas Noon Talfourd, who was heavily involved in the publication; it praises the entire collection of Radcliffe's posthumous works, primarily focusing on the novel Gaston de Blondeville. Its brief mention of St. Alban's Abbey compares it to the newly-popular poetry of Walter Scott, and praises Radcliffe's sentimentality. A review in Scots Magazine similarly focused on Gaston, noting only that "To the romance, a series of good poems is appended", and praising Radcliffe's decision to keep the poetry separate from the novel. The United States Review and Literary Gazette also appreciated the separation of poetry from prose, and considered St. Alban's Abbey an improvement on the poems Radcliffe had previously included within her novels. This review's highest praise is that "there are some quite pleasing passages, which come very near being what may be justly called good poetry".

The London Literary Gazette criticized St. Alban's Abbey as "too diffuse, and too much overlaid with a display of antiquarian knowledge", praising only the final scene where wife, husband, and father reunite. This scene, the reviewer says, "is finely told, and greatly surpasses, in every kind of interest, the main story to which it is appended". The Ladies' Monthly Museum was negative about the entire posthumous collection, stating that "Mrs. Radcliffe seems to have shewn her judgment in withholding it from publication."

A later review gave a more negative assessment. In 1834, a review of The Poetical Works of Ann Radcliffe warns readers that "we can say little that is favourable of her Metrical Romance". Despite expecting her skills with imagery and drama to be well-suited to the form, the review complains that the result is disconnected, tedious, and too long.

In modern contexts, the poem is often neglected in scholarship on Radcliffe. The literary critic Ruth Facer says, in her biography of Radcliffe, that the poem "does her no justice; it is long, rambling and tedious. The rhyme scheme is extremely variable and verses ... bear little relation to her rich prose style." Rictor Norton's biography of Radcliffe says only that "[t]he poem runs to several hundred pages of turgid and morbid rhyming couplets."
