= The Castles of Athlin and Dunbayne =

1789 gothic novel by Ann Radcliffe

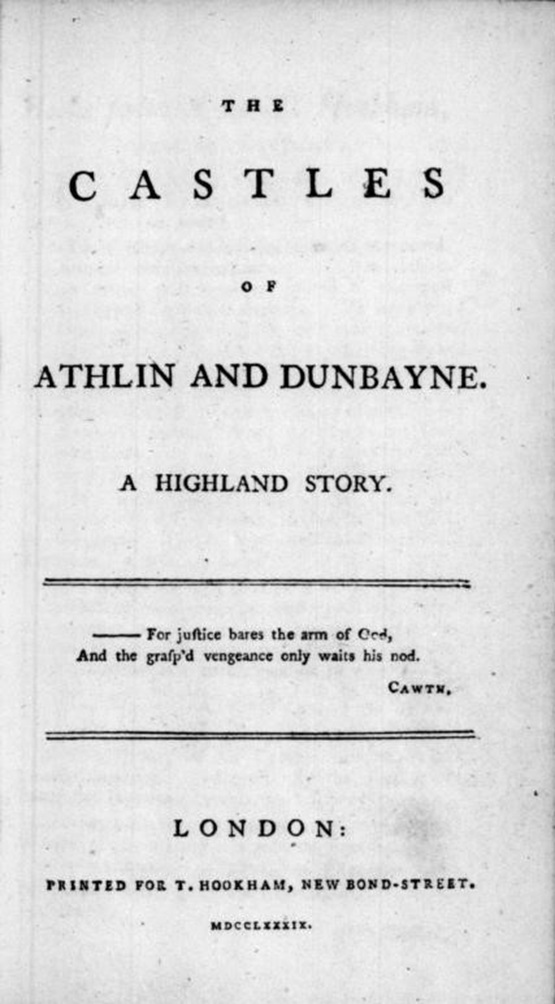
- Title page of first edition
- Author: Ann Radcliffe
- Language: English
- Genre: Gothic novel
- Publisher: Thomas Hookham
- Publication date: 1789
- Publication place: England
- Media type: Print
- Pages: 280

The Castles of Athlin and Dunbayne is a gothic novel by Ann Radcliffe, first published in London by Thomas Hookham in 1789. In her introduction to the 1995 Oxford World Classic's edition of the text, Alison Milbank stated that the novel's plot "unites action of a specifically Scottish medieval nature with the characterization and morality of the eighteenth-century cult of sensibility."

The novel, subtitled "A Highland Tale", is set in the feudal Scottish Highlands and centred around the two titular castles of Athlin and Dunbayne. Whilst Athlin – "an edifice built on the summit of a rock whose base was in the sea" – is home to a refined society headed by the gentle Countess Matilda and her children, Dunbayne is the domain of the villainous Baron Malcolm. The novel's plot follows the young Earl of Athlin, Osbert, who seeks to take revenge against the unlawful murder of his father by the Baron Malcolm twelve years earlier after meeting the peasant Alleyn (who is later revealed to be the true heir to the castle of Dunbayne).

Though significantly shorter than Radcliffe's later and more famous novels (chiefly The Mysteries of Udolpho), in The Castles of Athlin and Dunbayne Radcliffe began to shape many of the themes and conventions that would later come to define her work.

== Plot summary ==
The novel tells the story of two clans, those belonging to the Castles of Athlin and Dunbayne. The narration begins by recounting the death of the "noble" old Earl of Athlin during an ambush at the hands of Malcom, Baron of Dunbayne, a "proud, oppressive, revengful" man who resented the Earl's superiority and power. Distraught at the loss of her husband and her people in the conflict, the widowed Matilda "forbore to sacrifice the lives of her few remaining people to a feeble attempt at retaliation" and withdrew from public life to raise her children in the "bosom of her people and family".

The story itself begins twelve years later with Earl's children, Osbert and Mary, now nineteen and seventeen respectively. Osbert, whom "nature had given him a mind ardent and susceptible, to which education had added refinement and expansion," learning of his father's death wishes to lead his clansmen against Dunbayne to avenge him but is forbidden by his mother. In effort to "stifle the emotions which roused him to arms" Osbert departs to wander the Highlands, where he meets by chance a young Highland peasant named Alleyn after losing his way. Alleyn offers to act as Osbert's guide through the countryside, informing the young Earl of Malcolm's poor stewardship of the surrounding lands and the people's displeasure with the Baron. The two young men are impressed by one another's characters and Alleyn is invited to Athlin as Osbert's guest, where he takes part in the castle's martial exercises and impresses the young Mary. During the feast following the clansmen are roused again to the idea of vengeance and, despite the protestations of Matilda and Mary, Osbert agrees to lead an effort against the castle of Dunbayne.

Though both Osbert and Alleyn fight valiantly, the assault on Dunbayne is unsuccessful; a number of their clansmen are slain and both young men are captured. The attack on Malcolm's castle fails, and both Alleyn and Osbert are taken captive as prisoners of war. Matilda, desperate for the prisoners' safe return, sends offers of ransom to the Baron who rejects the offers in contempt and instead settles on a scheme to capture Mary (whose beauty had "often been reported to him") to use her later a bargaining tool.

The Baron dispatches men who come across Mary whilst she is out riding. Mary attempts to escape, but is unable to outrun the men and faints in fear as the men seize her horse. A scuffle ensues as another man appears, snatching Mary away from her would-be captors. Though Mary is overcome by terror the stranger is revealed to in fact be Alleyn, who has escaped Dunbayne along with the other clansmen. Mary is charmed by the young man's bravery and heroism and the two begin to fall in love, despite their seeming differences in status.

At Dunbayne, meanwhile, Malcolm is enraged to discover that his attempt to possess Mary has failed and that Alleyn and the other captives have escaped: furious at being bested, Malcolm resolves to threaten to execute Osbert if Matilda will not allow him to marry Mary. The imprisoned Osbert becomes aware that there are two ladies who appear to also be prisoners of Malcolm within the castle, and is comforted by both the idea of their presence and the beautiful music he hears from his cell. Whilst the inhabitants of Athlin attempt to lead a rescue mission for their young Earl and Mary begs to be allowed to sacrifice herself for her brothers safe return, Osbert is able to temporarily escape his cell and discover the ladies of the Castle. The women are discovered to be Louisa, the widow of the former Baron of Dunbayne and Malcolm's sister-in-law, and her beautiful daughter Laura (whose music Osbert has heard). Osbert, endeared by the oppression of the woman and enchanted by Laura, learns that on the death of his brother Malcolm immediately took possession of the castle and effectively imprisoned the Baroness and her daughter within the castle.

After many complications, Osbert is able to escape the restraints of Malcolm, whom he eventually challenges. Malcolm is then killed in the ensuing battle. Before he dies, Malcolm confesses to Louisa that her son, whom she had thought dead, was really alive. Malcolm had hidden him away with a peasant family to procure the title for himself. Laura and Osbert prepare to wed, but Mary and Alleyn are both unhappy. It is then miraculously discovered the Alleyn is in fact Philip, Louisa's long-lost son. He is recognised by his mother by a strawberry mark on his skin. This makes Alleyn the rightful Baron of Dunbayne. The novel ends with the double wedding of Laura and Osbert, and Mary and Alleyn.

== Main characters ==
- The Former Earl of Athlin: Murdered before the start of the novel by Malcolm, bequeathing his title to his son, Osbert.
- Matilda: The Countess of Athlin; mother of Mary and Osbert. Matilda devotes her time to the education of her children, especially Mary. She is overcome with grief when Osbert is captured by Malcolm and is unable to decide whether to acquiesce to Malcolm's ransom request (i.e., Mary) or let her son die. Her character is marked by perfect propriety; she attempts to dissuade Mary against loving Alleyn, as he is of a lower class.
- Osbert, Earl of Athlin: Osbert is the son of Matilda and the murdered Earl, and the brother of Mary. He is torn between filial duty to his father (avenging his death), and filial duty to his mother, who entreats him to stay his passions and abandon his desire for revenge.
- Mary: The delicate, young sister of Osbert. She is clearly educated after the proper fashion of the high-born sentiments. Her fragility is often stressed throughout the novel: numerous times she succumbs to fainting fits and bouts of tears. Despite the stressed importance of propriety, she falls in love with the low-born Alleyn—but she does not go so far as act upon this passion. She suffers the torments of loving a man to whom she cannot possibly give herself. This torment is only solved with the miraculous discovery of Alleyn's true identity.
- Alleyn: A highlander, both "manly" and "virtuous" despite his low birth. He falls in love with the gentle and delicate Mary, and devotes himself to earning her favour. He does so by fighting alongside Osbert, and rescuing both him and Mary from Malcolm's cruel ministrations. While he earns the favour and the love of Mary, there is still the problem of his low-birth. It is discovered, however, that he was indeed Philip, the long-lost son of the former Baron of Dunbayne. Therefore, this conflict is solved. He assumes the title of Baron and is able wed with Mary.
- Malcolm, Baron of Dunbayne: The novel's villain who murdered the former Earl and who is set upon destroying Osbert and possessing the delicate Mary. Malcolm was the younger brother of the former Baron, who died and left behind a widow, son, and daughter. To secure the title for himself, upon the Baron's death, Malcolm claimed that his nephew, Philip (AKA Alleyn) had died, when in actuality he had been tossed aside to be raised by a peasant family. He disposed the widow Baroness of her lands, and holds her and her daughter prisoner. He is eventually defeated and slain by Osbert, leaving Alleyn to resume his rightful role as Baron.
- Louisa, the Baroness: The widow of the former Baron of Dunbayne; mother to Laura and Philip (AKA Alleyn). Orientating from Switzerland, she is dispossessed of both her husband's lands as well as her own by Malcolm. She concerns herself with the education of her daughter, much like Matilda.
- Laura: The daughter of Louisa and the niece of Malcolm, likewise held captive within the castle walls of Dunbayne. When Osbert is also held captive by Malcolm, he hears Laura playing the lute. He is captivated by the sweet melodious tune and it keeps him from committing suicide. Osbert finds comfort in her beauty and feminine charms and succumbs to love. They eventually marry after the defeat of Malcolm.
