= A Journey Made in the Summer of 1794 =

Travel book by Ann Radcliffe

A Journey Made in the Summer of 1794, through Holland and the Western Frontier of Germany, with a Return Down the Rhine: to which are added Observations During a Tour to the Lakes of Lancashire, Westmoreland, and Cumberland is a travel narrative by Ann Radcliffe first published in 1795. Radcliffe at that time was the famous and successful author of four Gothic novels, largely set in Southern European locales which she never visited; this journey was her first time leaving England, and featured a Northern itinerary. The book was published by George Robinson, who published Radcliffe's bestselling The Mysteries of Udolpho the preceding year.
