= A Sicilian Romance =

1790 gothic novel by Ann Radcliffe

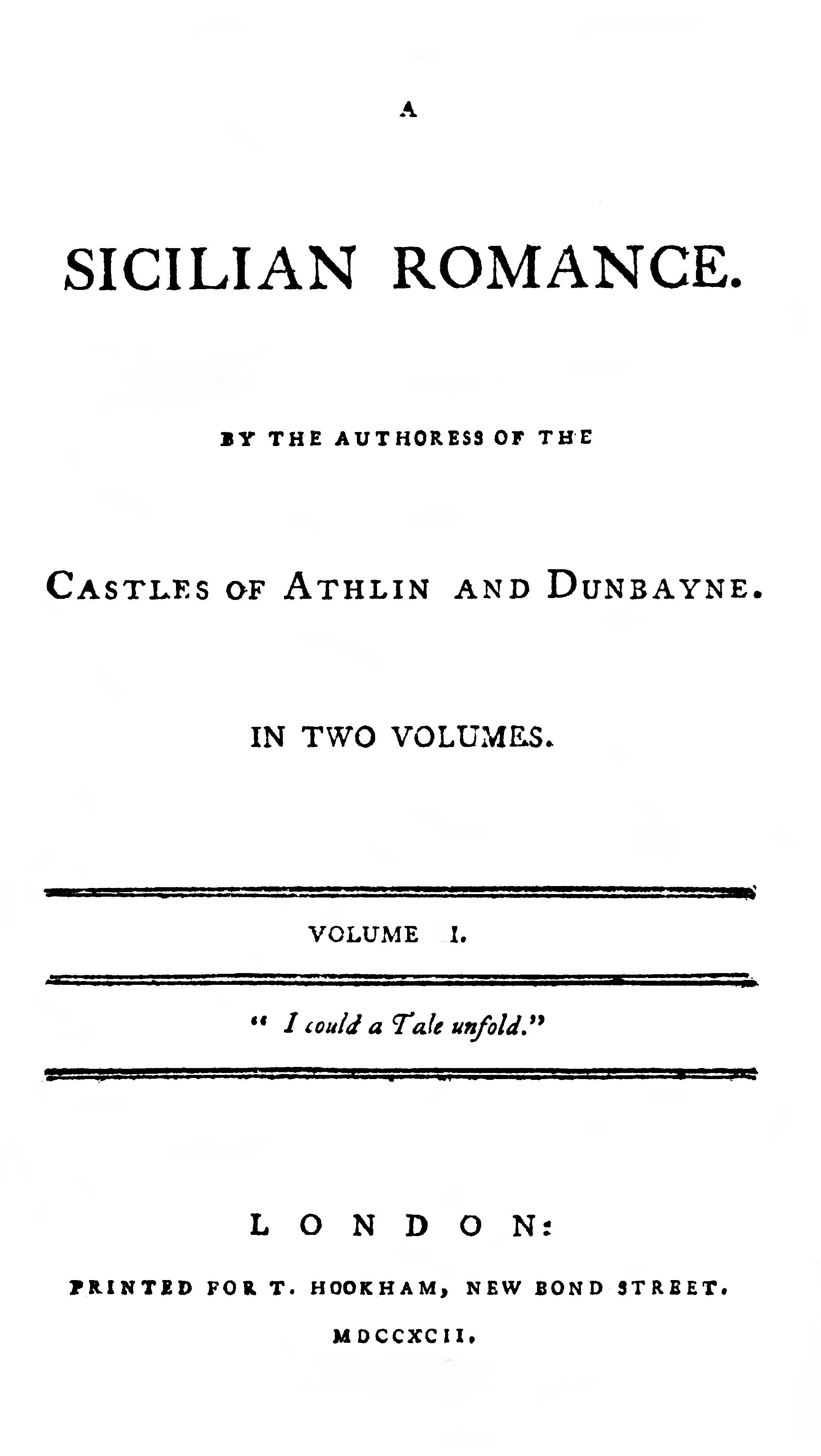
- Title page of first edition
- Author: Ann Radcliffe
- Language: English
- Genre: Gothic; Horror; Romance
- Published: 15 April 1790
- Publisher: Thomas Hookham
- Publication place: United Kingdom
- Pages: volume I, 239 pages; volume II, 216 pages
- OCLC: 1204809603

A Sicilian Romance is a gothic novel by Ann Radcliffe. It was her second published work, and was first published anonymously in 1790.

== Summary ==
The plot concerns the fallen nobility of the house of Mazzini, on the northern shore of Sicily, as related by a tourist who learns of their turbulent history from a monk he meets at the ruins of their once-magnificent castle.

The Marquis Mazzini's daughters, Emilia and Julia, are beautiful and accomplished young ladies. Julia quickly falls in love with the young and handsome Italian count Hippolitus de Vereza, but to her dismay her father decides that she should marry Duke de Luovo instead. After much thought Julia attempts to elope with Hippolitus on the night before her wedding. However, their escape has been anticipated, and the Marquis ambushes and seemingly kills Hippolitus, whose body is carried away by his servants. He insists Julia to accept the engagement with de Luovo, but after much difficulty she escapes again alone.

Mazzini and De Luovo spend much of the novel trying to catch Julia, who has to flee from her various hiding places as she narrowly avoids capture and eventually ends up, by a secret tunnel, in the abandoned and seemingly haunted southern apartments of the Mazzini castle. There she finds that her mother, thought to be dead, has instead been imprisoned there for years by the Marquis, who had grown to despise her. The Marquis's new wife, Maria de Vellorno, is discovered and accused of infidelity by her husband, therefore she poisons the Marquis and stabs herself. Before he dies, the Marquis confesses to Ferdinand, his son, that his mother has been imprisoned, and hands him the keys. However, his mother and Julia have already been freed by Hippolitus, who had recovered from his wounds. Ferdinand then finds them at a lighthouse on the coast, waiting to leave for Italy, and they are all joyfully reunited.

== Major themes ==
The introduction to the Oxford World's Classics edition notes that in this novel "Ann Radcliffe began to forge the unique mixture of the psychology of terror and poetic description that would make her the great exemplar of the Gothic novel, and the idol of the Romantics". The novel explores the "cavernous landscapes and labyrinthine passages of Sicily's castles and convents to reveal the shameful secrets of its all-powerful aristocracy".
