= The Italian (Radcliffe novel) =

1797 gothic novel by Ann Radcliffe

The Italian, or the Confessional of the Black Penitents: A Romance
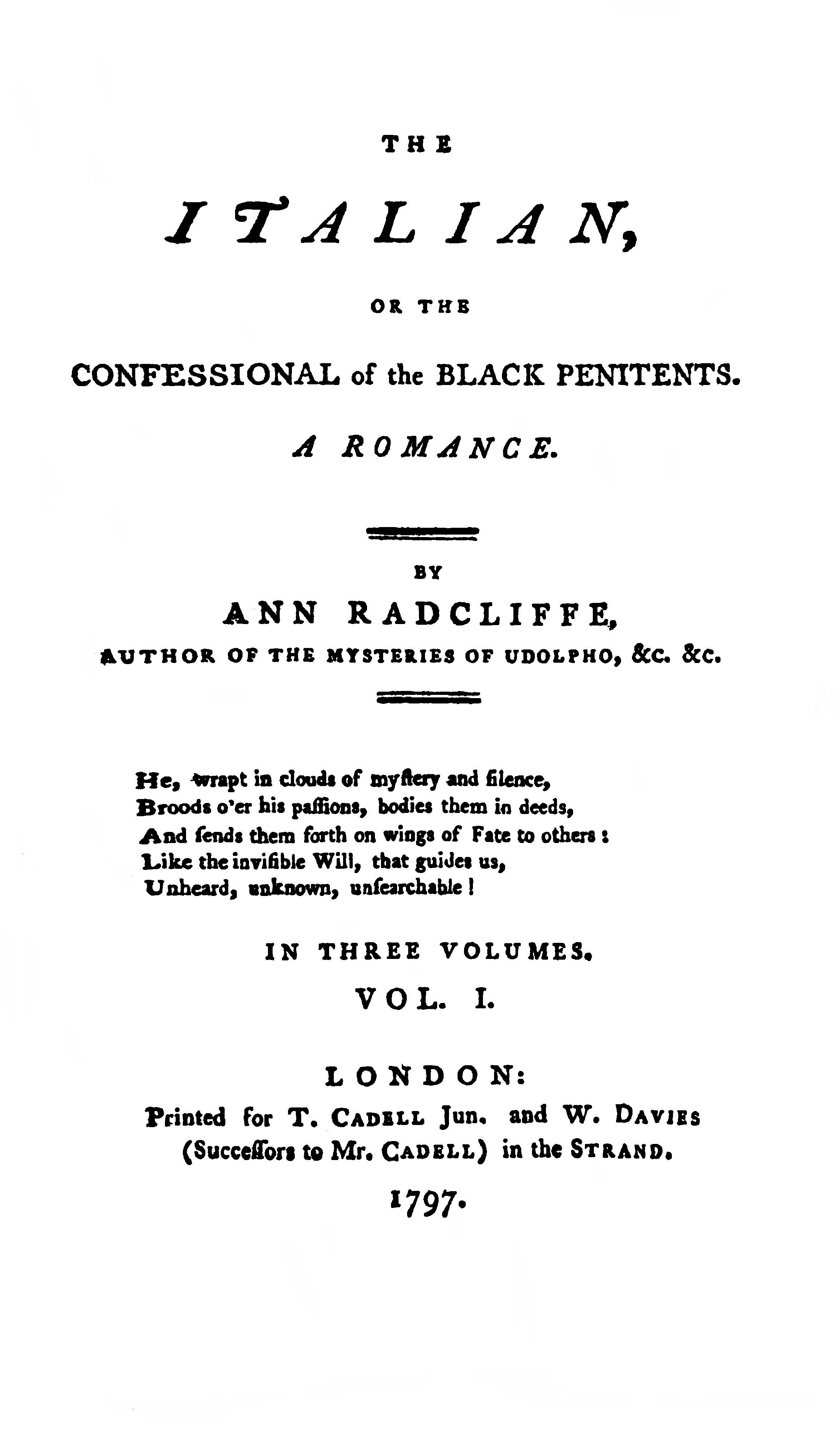
- First edition title page.
- Author: Ann Radcliffe
- Language: English
- Genre: Gothic fiction Sentimental novel
- Publication date: 1797 (published on 12 December 1796, although the title page is dated 1797)
- Publication place: United Kingdom
- Media type: Print

The Italian, or the Confessional of the Black Penitents: A Romance is a Gothic novel written by the English author Ann Radcliffe. The novel was first published in December 1796, although the title page is dated 1797. It is the last book Radcliffe published during her lifetime (although she would go on to write the novel Gaston de Blondeville, it was only published posthumously in 1826). The Italian has a dark, mysterious, and somber tone which fixates on the themes of love, devotion, and persecution during the time period of Holy Inquisition. The novel deals with issues prevalent at the time of the French Revolution, such as religion, aristocracy, and nationality. Radcliffe's renowned use of veiled imagery is considered to have reached its height of sophistication and complexity in The Italian; concealment and disguise are central motifs of the novel. The novel is noted for its extremely effective antagonist, Father Schedoni, who influenced the Byronic characters of Victorian literature.

== Synopsis ==
The plot starts in Naples, Italy in around 1764, in the church of Santa Maria del Pianto, where an English traveller is speaking with an Italian friar. The Englishman notices a man of extraordinary appearance in a shadowy area of the church, who is an assassin, according to the friar. When the Englishman asks why this assassin is protected in the church, an Italian friend travelling with him directs his attention to a famous confessional in the church, which was the scene of a particularly startling confession. He offers to send him a narrative relating this former assassin's confession, and the problems that attended it, to his hotel, and the two retire from the church and go their separate ways. The Englishman reads the story in his hotel room as follows:

In 1758, in the church of San Lorenzo in Naples, Vincentio di Vivaldi sees the beautiful Ellena di Rosalba with her aunt, Signora Bianchi. Vivaldi is struck with her beauty, and intends to court her, with the hopes that they will end up married. When Vivaldi's mother, the proud Marchesa, hears about his love for a poor orphan, she appeals to her ambitious and cunning confessor, Father Schedoni, to prevent the marriage, with a promise that she will help him obtain promotion in his order. As Vivaldi continues to visit Signora Bianchi at Villa Altieri, he is approached by a monk, who seems to be an apparition, threatening him to keep away from the villa and Ellena. After each encounter, Vivaldi tries in vain to capture the strange monk, with the help of his friend Bonarmo and his faithful servant Paulo. Vivaldi suspects that the monk is Father Schedoni, and is determined to know why his courtship of Ellena is discouraged. After being promised the hand of Ellena and appointed her guardian by Signora Bianchi before her sudden mysterious death, Vivaldi finds that Ellena has been kidnapped from the villa, and immediately deduces it is by the hand of the Marchesa and Schedoni. Leaving Naples secretly in pursuit of her abductors, Vivaldi and Paulo eventually find Ellena held at the remote convent of San Stefano, at the mercy of a cruel Lady Abbess, and Vivaldi infiltrates the convent disguised as a religious pilgrim to rescue her. In the convent, Ellena befriends a lovely but melancholy nun, Sister Olivia, who helps her escape from the convent into the care of Vivaldi.

While riding towards Naples after the escape, Vivaldi presses Ellena for an immediate marriage, and she finally consents. But moments before they are to take their vows before a priest at a church, agents claiming to work for the Inquisition, informed by Schedoni, interrupt and arrest Vivaldi on the false charge of abducting a nun from a convent. Vivaldi and Paulo are taken to the prisons of the Inquisition in Rome to be questioned and put to trial. They are confused about the circumstances behind their confinement, which their captors will not reveal. Ellena, however, is sent by order of Schedoni to a lone house on the seashore, inhabited only by the villain Spalatro, Schedoni's accomplice in previous crimes, to be murdered. Schedoni comes to the house to assassinate Ellena personally, but becomes convinced from a portrait on her person that she is his daughter. Schedoni has a change of heart, and decides to take Ellena personally back to Naples to hide her from the Marchesa. While on their journey, they once again encounter the dismissed Spalatro, who had followed them with designs of extorting money from Schedoni, but Spalatro is shot in a scuffle and left behind (and shortly after dies of fever). Schedoni and Ellena arrive in Naples, where Schedoni places Ellena in the convent of Santa Maria del Pianto until Vivaldi can be freed. Schedoni returns to the Marchesa, keeping secret his endorsement of the marriage of the Marchesa's son and his daughter, but distracts the Marchesa temporarily with information that Ellena comes from a noble lineage, so a marriage would at least be proper, if not lucrative. Meanwhile, in the prison of the Inquisition, the mysterious monk who had previously eluded Vivaldi, now known to be Nicola di Zampari, appears and narrates to him the guilty crimes of Father Schedoni before he became a monk, and convinces him to formally call Schedoni and Father Ansaldo, to whom Schedoni had previously disclosed his deeds in a confessional booth, to the trial as the accused and witness, respectively, in the crimes. Both are made to appear before the tribunal, where Schedoni is convicted from their testimony of murdering his brother, as well as marrying and later stabbing his brother's wife in a jealous rage, in his former life as the dissolute Count di Bruno, or Count di Marinella. Schedoni is sentenced to death, and before he is led away into confinement, tells Vivaldi his relationship to Ellena and her whereabouts. Vivaldi is also escorted back to his cell, with the knowledge that the charges against him will be dropped. Meanwhile, Paulo (Vivaldi's servant) escapes the prison and notifies the Marchese of Vivaldi's situation, who hurries to Rome to secure his son's release. Schedoni, on his deathbed, in the presence of the tribunal, further reveals that he had already fatally poisoned both himself and his betrayer Nicola with poison concealed in his vest.

Back at the convent, Ellena distinguishes a voice all too familiar, and sees her dearly loved Sister Olivia in the convent courtyard. While the two recount each other's experiences since they last parted, Ellena's servant Beatrice comes to report the sudden death of the Marchesa from a long-dormant but natural illness (having Confessed, the Marchesa has also exacted a promise from her husband that he should sanction the marriage of Ellena and Vivaldi). Beatrice and Olivia recognise each other, and elate Ellena with the news that she is the daughter of Olivia, who is revealed to be the Countess di Bruno, whom Schedoni had stabbed in jealous rage and left for dead. This leads Ellena to realise that she is actually not Schedoni's daughter, but his niece. Since they are of the same lineage, Ellena is still from a noble family, which would allow her to marry Vivaldi with honour. Once it is revealed that Ellena is from an aristocratic family, it is determined that she has the royal blood that allows her to be worthy of marrying Vivaldi.

The ending of the novel is a happy one; Vivaldi and Paulo are released from prison, Ellena is reunited with her mother, and Vivaldi and Ellena are joined in marriage, and all the villains have died. The Marchesa dies shortly before finding out that her son has been freed from prison. Father Schedoni, condemned to die, poisons himself and Nicola di Zampari, and calls a tribunal including the Marchese and Vivaldi to witness their final confessions at his deathbed.

== Characters ==
- Vincentio di Vivaldi: Son of the Marchese and Marchesa di Vivaldi of Naples; Ellena's suitor
- Ellena Rosalba: Orphan niece of Signora Bianchi; Daughter of Sister Olivia; Vivaldi's lover
- Father Schedoni/ Count di Marinella: Confessor to the Marchesa; uncle to Ellena
- Marchesa di Vivaldi: Mother of Vivaldi; Conspirator with Schedoni
- Marchese di Vivaldi: Father of Vivaldi
- Paulo: Servant of Vivaldi
- Signora Bianchi: Aunt of Ellena
- Sister Olivia/ Countess di Bruno: Nun at San Stefano Convent, Mother of Ellena
- Spalatro: Conspirator with Schedoni and the Marchesa
- Nicola di Zampari: Accuser of Schedoni; Informer to Vivaldi
- Less Significant Characters: Bonarmo, Lady Abbess of San Stefano, Inquisitors, Father Ansaldo, Beatrice, Jeronimo

== Locations ==
- Naples: City where Vivaldi, his parents, Ellena, Schedoni, Paulo and Signora Bianchi reside
- Villa Altieri: Residence of Ellena and Signora Bianchi
- San Lorenzo: Church where Vivaldi first meets Ellena and Signora Bianchi
- San Stefano: Convent to Sister Olivia; prison to Ellena
- Santa Maria del Pianto/ Santa del Pianto: Convent and Monastery referenced to
- Prison of the Inquisition

== Imagery ==
Ann Radcliffe uses the technique of scene imagery to evoke emotion in characters, and to describe landscapes and surroundings in extreme detail. The most notable imagery in the novel are from art pieces and the picturesque. The actual artists "mentioned were seventeenth century Italian artists with those works Mrs. Radcliffe was probably familiar", while the characters also turn into artists who paint portraits of other characters in their heads. Sculptures can be seen in the tribunal members of the Inquisition for their faces are unyielding and hard as stone, and even the flickering lamps cannot soften their facial expressions.

Aside from imagery being described as physical art, Radcliffe includes images of personification, animals, religion, storms, magic, and enchantment. As noted by E.J. Clery, "Radcliffe's heroines are women of imagination. By their taste for scenery and aptitude for fancy they transform the plots of sentimental fiction into otherwordly romance: they are effectively the co-authors of their own stories". Images in the novel make it possible to see one thing in the expressions of something else, reason as to which Radcliffe creates anxiety from descriptions of terror and the uncanny. "The solemnity of the scene accorded with the temper of his mind, and he listened in deep attention for returning sounds, which broke upon his ear like distant thunder muttering imperfectly from the clouds". (page 12 Oxford World Classics Edition) All of the imagery presented in The Italian pull the novel together by way of description, which sets the scene for the reader and the characters.

== The Female Gothic in The Italian ==
Ann Radcliffe's writing falls under the genre of the Female Gothic, which is distinguished by the use of the explained supernatural. The Female Gothic differs from the Male Gothic in that elements initially perceived as supernatural are eventually revealed to have rational explanations, rather than serving as indicators of an actual ghost of otherworldly entity. These explanations largely serve to expose a true human threat, often the desire and motivations of characters seeking control and power over others. The Female Gothic also tends to advocate against injustice committed against female characters, ascribing these heroines with more agency and independence than was typical for representations of the time as well as the genre of the Gothic itself. Speaking of Diana Wallace's book, Female Gothic Histories: Gender, History and the Gothic, Yael Shapira concludes that the Female Gothic "helps articulate women's experiences and their problematic status in both history and historiography". This differs from the traditional style of the Male Gothic, which Wallace feels is limited by the inherent biases of a male perspective. In this sense, the Female Gothic "extended engagement with the ways in which the feminine has historically been constructed through male eyes" (106). As Kröger and Miller explain, "Ghosts are spooky but the true threat was one she saw in the real world: men who were willing to abuse women in order to gain wealth" (24).

== Reception ==
The Italian was first announced in December 1796. At the time of the novel's release, Ann Ward Radcliffe was already a well-known and well-received Gothic writer. She had gained fame from several of her earlier works, most noticeably The Romance of the Forest in 1791 and The Mysteries of Udolpho in 1794. Her reputation was successful enough to allow her to be read by learned gentlemen as well as young men and women. Because the term 'gothic story' was not commonly used in this period of time, Radcliffe's contemporaries used the term 'romance' to describe her genre. This term was classified as writing about miraculous tales through the use of poetic prose. This poetic element was referred to in multiple reviews of Radcliffe's The Italian and is considered to be the defining characteristic of the author's many Gothic works. This unique characteristic of her writing set the author apart from other writers of the time and earned her a reputation through the appraisal she received from many well-respected literary voices of the time. In general praise for the author, Sir Walter Scott called her "the first poetess of romance fiction"; while Nathan Drake wrote that she was, "the Shakespeare of Romance writers". He believed that her readers valued her unrivaled ability to create – to realise visually – an enchanted, storied, and landscaped past.

In a time where writing novels for commercial consumption was one of the only means through which a female author could earn a respectable living, The Italian was a great financial success for Radcliffe. Because of her reputation and earlier success, the author earned £800 from the original copyright of the novel, which was considered a very large sum for a female author and was unparalleled by many of Radcliffe's contemporaries.

The Italian prompted a wide variety of both favourable and unfavorable reviews, making the overall reception of the novel very mixed. To some critics, it was the high point of Ann Radcliffe's short but productive career; to others, it represented a distinct decline in form from her earlier products.

Most reviewers were united in believing that the monk Schedoni was the most successful character that Radcliffe had created in any of her novels. Characterised as a man governed by an amalgam of anger, hypocrisy and guilt, the monk was praised as standing apart from the traditional conventions of Gothic protagonists, and many readers approved of his strong personality. Not only was he considered one of the best characters, but one of the best villains; he had "great energy, with strong passions, and inordinate pride; sometimes softened by the feelings of humanity, but preserving the firmnesss of his mind in the most trying situations". However, many of these reviews found a fault in the extent of his wicked nature, and others asserted that Radcliffe's careful handling of his character and attempt to implement a touch of parental affection to soften him only served to make him seem less realistic.

Reviews that were run in response to The Italian echo these tensions between approval and disappointment in what would be the final novel of Radcliffe's Gothic career. The writer of an 1827 review in the United States Review and Literary Gazette declares his belief that The Italian is Radcliffe's "greatest work," paying particular reverence to the "masterly dialogues" in several key scenes, including the interview between Marchesa and Schedoni in the church of San Nicolo as well as the discussion between Schedoni and Spalatro, in which the later refuses to murder Ellena. The writer of a 1797 review in The Monthly Review praised Radcliffe's visual and descriptive language in the novel, citing "the part…which displays the greatest genius, and the most force of description, is the account of the scenes which passed in the long house on the shore of the Adriatic, between Schedoni, Ellena, and Spalatro: – The horrible sublimity which characterises the discovery made by the former that Ellena was his daughter, at the instant in which he was about to stab her, was perhaps unparalleled". This style of 'painting the sublime' reflects the preference for allegorical or transcendent imagery over physical or realistic imagery in the Gothic literary and artistic period. Originating in the works of Edmund Burke's On the Sublime and Beautiful, which also parallels Radcliffe's preference in the use of terror over horror in her novels. Similarly, a later evaluation in the Edinburgh Review described the mastery of Ann Radcliffe's narrative description as allowing the reader to almost see, feel and experience the events on the Mediterranean alongside the characters.

However, various negative reviews emerged and had issues when comparing The Italian to Radcliffe's earlier and more overwhelmingly successful pieces. Several articles commented on the difficulty the author had in maintaining her reputation after her early success. The writer of The English Review's article on The Italian in December 1796 attempted to make a rational assessment of the disappointment that some people felt in reading the novel, saying that: "It was impossible to raise curiosity and expectation to a higher pitch than she has done in her Mysteries of Udolpho; yet these mysteries she accounted for in a natural manner". Having been frightened perfectly by Radcliffe before, this critique believed that readers were likely prepared for the twists of The Italian. There was also some unfavorable criticism of the scenes dealing with the Spanish Inquisition, which are sometimes considered too unrealistic or ridiculous to be believable to the audience. A review in The Critical Review from June 1798 stated that, "Among those parts of the romance which we disapprove, we may reckon the examination before the court of inquisition: it is so improbable, that we should rather have attributed it to one of Mrs. Radcliffe's numerous imitators". Despite this, the review went on to say that there still remained several scenes that would successfully seize the imagination and interest the passions of readers.

Following Radcliffe's retirement after this novel at the young age of thirty-two, and her death a few decades later, public opinion of her overall works including The Italian swung to a more positive light. Upon her death in 1823, the political and social atmosphere in England had changed again and Radcliffe regained positive assessments of her importance in the history of Gothic writers. In her obituary in the New Monthly Magazine, she was described as "the able authoress of some of the best romances that ever appeared in the English language;" in the Literary Gazette she was, "the finest writer in this kind of fiction that ever existed;" and in the Gentleman’s Magazine she was noted to have produced romances that we able to be translated into 'every European tongue' to the 'honour of the country.'

== Anti-Catholicism, oppression, and women's independence ==
The Italian provides an in depth look into Radcliffe's portrayal of the Catholic Church as cruel, arrogant, and corrupt. The character Schedoni solidifies the Church as an opposing force. He is murderous, manipulative, hypocritical, and above all else he represents the "un-English" way of life. Unlike Ellena, whom, like the rest, is Italian, and represents the ideal behavior of English women. She is both mentally and materially independent. Ellena's clear "Englishness" separates her from the foreign background of Italy and the villainous church. Although the church is painted in a negative light, likely due to Radcliffe's own Protestant ideology, the convent Santa Maria del Pianto is shown as a refuge from "motherhood, wifehood, and the heterosexual lover." The convent provides intellectual and spiritual freedom for women. In the convent, Ellena was able to establish herself through small tasks and female connections. Ellena showcases the importance of the female attempts at self-definition.

== Symbols ==
The veil (nun's habit) – The veil, used by Ellena to aid her escape with Vivaldi after being captured, was given to her by Sister Olivia. This veil appears almost obsessively through the work, symbolising modesty, and reassuring protection and concealment of purpose.

- Modesty – In the scene where Vivaldi and Ellena meet in a church, Vivaldi falls in love with Ellena because of her beautiful voice and his desire to see her, as she is hidden behind the veil. This unveiling is through nature, not masculine desire as a breeze from the water caught the veil. This is an important scene in relevance to the veil as it shows how Ellena is not passive and does not need to be unveiled by Vivaldi.
- Reassuring protection and concealment of purpose – Since the veil is given to her by Sister Olivia (later found to be Ellena's mother) it protects her by disguising Ellena as she escapes from her prisons. The veil allows her a means of communicating safely with the other nuns and later Vivaldi. However, the veil is also what keeps her from her immediate marriage to Vivaldi.

== Relation to The Monk ==
Lewis and Radcliffe both influenced the tradition of the Gothic novel, but did so in different ways. Lewis wrote in the tradition of the masculine gothic, favoring depictions of horror, while Radcliffe preferred the evocation of terror, explaining in her essay "On The Supernatural in Poetry" her belief that "terror and horror are so far opposite that the first expands the soul, and awakens the faculties to a high degree of life; the other contracts, freezes, and nearly annihilates them" (Radcliffe). As an already established author, Radcliffe was a large influence in Lewis's writing career. Their notoriety and aesthetic contrasts led to the two often being compared – even by the authors themselves. Even as recently as 2005, writers such as Vartan Messier compare their styles: "The contrast between the two writers is obvious in their approach to the Gothic, and more particularly, in the explicitness of content and in their use of certain Gothic conventions." Unlike the characters in Lewis' novel, reviewers observed that Radcliffe illustrated that guilt and depravity can be constructed upon the desire for absolute power rather than mere sexuality, and their source is ultimately human rather than demonic. The direction in which Gothic literature was moving, from terror to horror, may have inhibited Radcliffe from continuing her career. A gender comparison can also be seen between The Italian and The Monk; Radcliffe indirectly depicts the desires that Lewis investigates explicitly.

== Shakespearean influence ==
There are few scholarly texts commenting on the direct influence of William Shakespeare on the stories and rhetoric of Radcliffe. It would only take a casual reader of both writers, however, to spot the similarities between The Italian and many of Shakespeare's works: "When one author not only makes allusions to the work of another, but also frequently directly quotes him, the case for influence can be firmly established. That Ann Radcliffe had a thorough knowledge of Shakespeare can be deduced from her use of his quotations as chapter headings to foretell succinctly the action of her novels. Even in the texts of the novels, phrases from Shakespeare appear, and these are not always the well-known phrases". The plays were also acted quite frequently in Radcliffe's day, so it is probable that "Radcliffe had seen Shakespeare’s dramas performed". Radcliffe also referenced the plays of Shakespeare, including Hamlet and The Tempest, in her personal journal. The "sameness" of her plots, a major criticism of Radcliffe, can also be attributed to her following the Romantic comedy model of Shakespeare.

"In [The Italian], her last critically acclaimed novel, she leaned heavily on the plots of Shakespeare". The plot follows the three stages of the romantic comedy model and parallels many of Shakespeare's plays including "the thwarted love" present in Romeo and Juliet, the villa scene where Vivaldi overhears Ellena nearly a facsimile of the balcony scene; Olivia's reappearance after years of faking her death mirroring the character Hermione, and Olivia's daughter Ellena being brought up in a lower class than her birth mirroring the Hermione's daughter Perdita in The Winter's Tale; the play within the play wherein Schedoni sees his own actions depicted just as Claudius does in Hamlet, as well as Schedoni murdering his brother and marrying his wife just as Claudius; the "aura of superstition and fear" that Schedoni and Spalatro experience while preparing to kill Ellena "is almost taken verbatim from Macbeth”, as Spalatro sees the ghost of the man he killed, just as Macbeth sees Banquo, and both men experience the delusional states of paranoia both Macbeth and Lady Macbeth experience during and after Duncan's murder; Schedoni mimics Iago from Othello as he psychologically manipulates other characters, and his manipulations are the catalyst for the major conflicts in the plot.

The characters themselves also appear to mimic the characteristics of Shakespeare's heroes, heroines and villains. Ellena has the beloved status of Juliet with the pride of Cordelia from King Lear; Vivaldi is the passionate lover like Romeo; and Father Schedoni, the most developed character in the novel, is a manipulator like Iago, tortured by his love for Ellena just as Othello is tortured by his love for Desdemona, faces the oncoming, inevitable consequences of his bloodshed just as Macbeth.

The animalistic imagery used to describe Schedoni is also taken verbatim from the works of Shakespeare. He is described as a "serpent" mirroring language from Macbeth, A Midsummer Night's Dream, and Romeo and Juliet; he is described as a "tiger" mirroring language from Romeo and Juliet, King Lear, Macbeth, and Richard III; a "vulture" mirroring the language of King Lear, Macbeth, and Titus Andronicus; a "basilisk" mirroring language in Richard III, The Winter’s Tale, and Cymbeline.

== Editions ==
- The Italian, Oneworld Classics, 2008 ISBN 978-1-84749-054-4
- The Italian, Penguin Classics, 2001 ISBN 978-0-14-043754-6
- Radcliffe, Ann and Jane Austen. Two Gothic Classics by Women [The Italian and Northanger Abbey], edited and introduced by Deborah D. Rogers, Signet Classics, 1995.
- The Italian, Oxford World's Classics, 2017 ISBN 978-0198704430
