= Ann Radcliffe =

English novelist (1764–1823)

- Born: Ann Ward; 9 July 1764; Holborn, London, England
- Died: 7 February 1823 (aged 58); London, England
- Resting place: St George's, Hanover Square
- Occupation: Novelist
- Spouse: William Radcliffe (m. 1787)
- Writing career
- Genre: Gothic
- Notable works: The Romance of the Forest; The Mysteries of Udolpho; The Italian

Ann Radcliffe (née Ward; 9 July 1764 – 7 February 1823) was an English novelist and poet who pioneered the Gothic novel. Her fourth and most popular novel, The Mysteries of Udolpho, was published in 1794. She is also remembered for her third novel, The Romance of the Forest (1791) and her fifth novel, The Italian (1797). Her novels combine suspenseful narratives, exotic historical settings, and apparently-supernatural events.

Radcliffe was famously shy and reclusive, leaving little record of the details of her life. She was born in London to a middle-class family, and was raised between Bath and the estate of her uncle Thomas Bentley. In 1787, she married William Radcliffe, a journalist, and moved to London. She published five novels between 1789 and 1797 to increasing acclaim and financial success, becoming one of the highest-paid authors of the eighteenth century. She then lived entirely privately for twenty-six years, travelling frequently with her husband. She died in 1823, aged 58, and her final works were published posthumously in 1826.

In total, she wrote six novels, a travelogue, and numerous poems. Radcliffe was the most popular writer of her day and almost universally admired; contemporary critics called her a "mighty enchantress" and the Shakespeare of romance-writers. During her lifetime, Gothic novels were known as the "Radcliffe school" of fiction, and she inspired numerous later authors, including Jane Austen, Mary Shelley, and Walter Scott.

== Biography ==
=== Early life ===
Radcliffe was born Ann Ward in Holborn, London on 9 July 1764. She was the only child of William Ward (1737–1798) and Ann Oates (1726–1800). At the time of her birth, her father owned a haberdashery shop in London. Her mother came from a family of leadmakers and glaziers. Her father had a famous uncle, William Cheselden, who was Surgeon to King George II; her mother descended from the De Witt family of Holland, with well-connected cousins including Sir Richard Jebb, a fashionable London physician, and Samuel Hallifax, a bishop. She had French Huguenot ancestry.

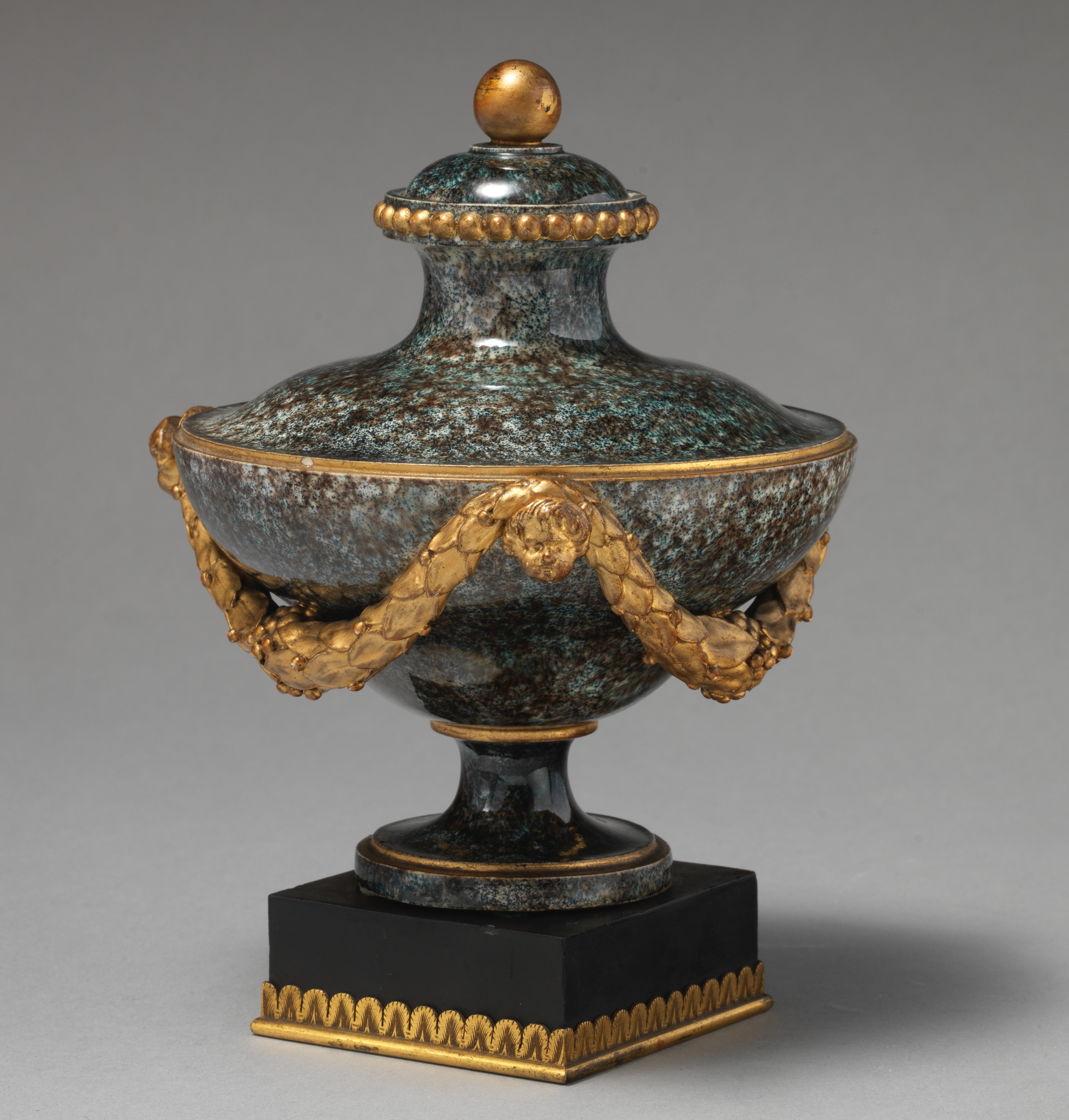
Wedgwood & Bentley vase. Radcliffe's father sold their wares in Bath, Somerset.

In 1772, Radcliffe's father moved to Bath to manage a shop owned by Thomas Bentley and Josiah Wedgwood, makers of Wedgwood porcelain. The shop was intended to sell second-rate goods to the less-discerning tourists of Bath, and her father avidly promoted the business. (Note: In later years, Wedgwood rarely mentioned the Bath shop, which he considered an embarrassing failure. Radcliffe's father promoted the store through newspaper advertisements and hand-delivered flyers, which Wedgwood considered vulgar and appalling.) He also supplemented his income by renting rooms to lodgers. Bentley was Radcliffe's maternal uncle, and more respectable as a land-owning member of the gentry. She often paid extended visits to his home in Chelsea, London and later Turnham Green. Wedgwood's daughter Susannah, known by the nickname Sukey, also stayed in Chelsea and is Radcliffe's only known childhood companion. (Note: Sukey later married Dr. Robert Darwin and had a son, the naturalist Charles Darwin.) Although mixing in some distinguished circles, Radcliffe seems to have made little impression in this society and was described by Wedgwood as "Bentley's shy little niece". Bentley and Wedgwood were both Unitarians, as was Radcliffe's grand-uncle Dr. John Jebb. Radcliffe herself regularly attended Anglican church services, but her biographer Rictor Norton suggests that she remained sympathetic to Unitarians and Dissenters.

=== Marriage ===
In 1787, when Radcliffe was 23 years old, she married William Radcliffe (1763–1830). William was, like Radcliffe, the child of a haberdasher. He attended Cambridge briefly in 1780, and finished a B.A. at Oxford in 1785. He spent some time as a student of law, but he did not complete his legal studies and instead turned his attention to literature and journalism. The couple were married in Bath, but soon after moved to London. William published several translations from Latin and French to support them, and in 1790 began working for the Gazetteer and New Daily Advertiser. According to the literary historian Nick Groom, this was "a fiercely radical paper that celebrated the French Revolution, freedom of the press, and Dissenters' rights." By many accounts, theirs was a happy marriage. Radcliffe called him her "nearest relative and friend".

According to a posthumous biography, Radcliffe started writing for amusement while her husband remained out late most evenings for work. She published her first novel, The Castles of Athlin and Dunbayne, in 1789 at the age of 25, and published her next three novels in short succession to increasing acclaim. At the height of her popularity, she was one of the highest-paid authors of the eighteenth century. Even as her works became famous, Radcliffe avoided the public eye, causing one eighteenth-century reviewer to comment that "nothing was known of her but her name on the title page". Biographers describe her as reserved and extremely shy. The money she earned from her novels eventually allowed her husband to quit his job in 1793, and paid for their vacation travel. She also provided some financial support to her mother-in-law, Deborah Radcliffe. In 1794, the Radcliffes made their only trip abroad, visiting Holland and Germany. In 1795, William returned as editor of the Gazetteer, and a year later, he purchased the English Chronicle or Universal Evening Post, a Whig newspaper. Ann Radcliffe published The Italian in 1797, the last of her works which was published in her lifetime.

=== Later life and death ===
After The Italian in 1797, Radcliffe ceased publishing and lived privately for the next 26 years. Her father died in 1798, leaving her some property near Leicester. Her mother died in 1800, leaving her the rest of the family's accumulated property; the rental income from her inheritance removed any financial need for Radcliffe to continue publishing. Radcliffe and her husband lived comfortably, travelling domestically almost once a year from 1797 to 1811. Some evidence suggests that the Radcliffes lived separately from 1812 to 1815, though the reason is unknown. As they aged in later years, the Radcliffes hired a carriage during the summer months to make trips to places near London. Although she did not publish, Radcliffe continued to write. She wrote poetry and another novel, Gaston de Blondeville, which was published after her death. She suffered from asthma, for which she received regular treatment.

Radcliffe's lack of interest in public life led to frequent rumours that she had gone insane as a result of her writing, or had died. For example, a travel narrative published by Elizabeth Isabella Spence in 1809 claimed that Radcliffe lived in Haddon Hall "under the most direful influence of ... incurable melancholy." These rumours were so popular that her posthumous biography included a statement from her physician that spoke about her mental condition in her later years. The New Monthly Magazine also published a posthumous rebuttal from her husband, insisting that "she was to be seen, every Sunday, at St James's Church; almost every fine day in Hyde Park; sometimes at the theatres, and very frequently at the Opera" and describing Radcliffe as "the rare union of the literary gentlewoman and the active housewife".

In early 1823, Radcliffe went to Ramsgate, where she caught a fatal chest infection. She died on 7 February 1823 at the age of 58 and was buried in a vault in the Chapel of Ease at St George's, Hanover Square, London. Although she had suffered from asthma for twelve years previously, her modern biographer, Rictor Norton, argues that she probably died of pneumonia caused by a bronchial infection, citing the description given by her physician, Dr. Scudamore, of how "a new inflammation seized the membranes of the brain". Her husband remarried in 1826 to their housekeeper Elizabeth, and died in 1830 in Versailles.

== Literary career ==
=== Publishing history ===
Radcliffe wrote six novels, which she always referred to as "romances". Her first novel, The Castles of Athlin and Dunbayne, was published in 1789. Early reviews were mostly unenthusiastic. The Monthly Review said that, while the novel was commendable for its morality, it appealed only to women and children because of its implausible plot. It was also criticised for its anachronisms regarding the Scottish Highlands. The next year, Radcliffe published her second novel, A Sicilian Romance, which received more praise but relatively little attention. Radcliffe's major success came with her third novel, The Romance of the Forest, in 1791. It garnered substantial praise, and sold well, establishing her reputation as a writer and creating anticipation for her future works.

In 1794, three years later, Radcliffe published The Mysteries of Udolpho, the source of much of her fame. At a time when the average amount earned by an author for a manuscript was £10, her publishers, G. G. and J. Robinson, bought the copyright for this novel for £500. The money allowed her and her husband to travel abroad for the first time, which she described in her travelogue A Journey Made in the Summer of 1794 (1795). In 1797, Radcliffe published The Italian. This novel is typically understood as a rebuttal to Matthew Gregory Lewis's 1796 novel The Monk, rejecting the increased violence and eroticism which he was bringing to the genre of Gothic literature. Her publishers Cadell and Davies bought the copyright for £800, making Radcliffe the highest-paid professional writer of the 1790s. This payment was three times her husband's yearly income.

The vast majority of novels in this period were published anonymously. Radcliffe only began to include her name after the success of her third novel. The Castles of Athlin and Dunbayne was published with no author information on the title page, while A Sicilian Romance listed the attribution "by the authoress of The Castles of Athlin and Dunbayne". The first edition of The Romance of the Forest similarly stated that it was "by the authoress of A Sicilian Romance &c". The second edition included her name for the first time, which continued to appear on subsequent novels and reprints.

Three years after her death, Henry Colburn published a collection of Radcliffe's unpublished works. It included her final novel Gaston de Blondeville, the long poem St. Alban's Abbey, A Metrical Tale, and a short biography written by Thomas Noon Talfourd with assistance from her widower. It also contained some shorter poems and her essay "On the Supernatural in Poetry", which outlines her distinction between "terror" and "horror". The distinction allows her to defend novels of the "Radcliffe School" (hers and her imitators) while criticizing the "Lewis School" of more-explicit horror influenced by Matthew Lewis's novel The Monk (1796). Aligning the Radcliffe School with the sublime and the Lewis School with the obscene, she writes: "Terror and Horror are so far opposite, that the first expands the soul and awakens the faculties to a high degree of life; the other contracts, freezes and nearly annihilates them."

== Themes ==
=== The "explained supernatural" ===
Radcliffe was known for including supernatural elements but eventually giving readers a rational explanation for the supernatural. Usually, Radcliffe would reveal the logical excuse for what first appeared to be supernatural towards the end of her novels, which led to heightened suspense. Some critics and readers found this disappointing. Regarding Radcliffe's penchant for explaining the supernatural, Walter Scott writes in Lives of the Novelists (1821–1824): "A stealthy step behind the arras may, doubtless, in some situations, and when the nerves are tuned to a certain pitch, have no small influence upon the imagination; but if the conscious listener discovers it to be only the noise made by the cat, the solemnity of the feeling is gone, and the visionary is at once angry with his sense for having been cheated, and with his reason for having acquiesced in the deception." Some modern critics have been frustrated by her work, as she fails to include "real ghosts". This disappointment could be motivated by the idea that works in the Romantic period ought to critique or undermine Enlightenment values such as rationalism and realism.

=== Gothic landscapes ===
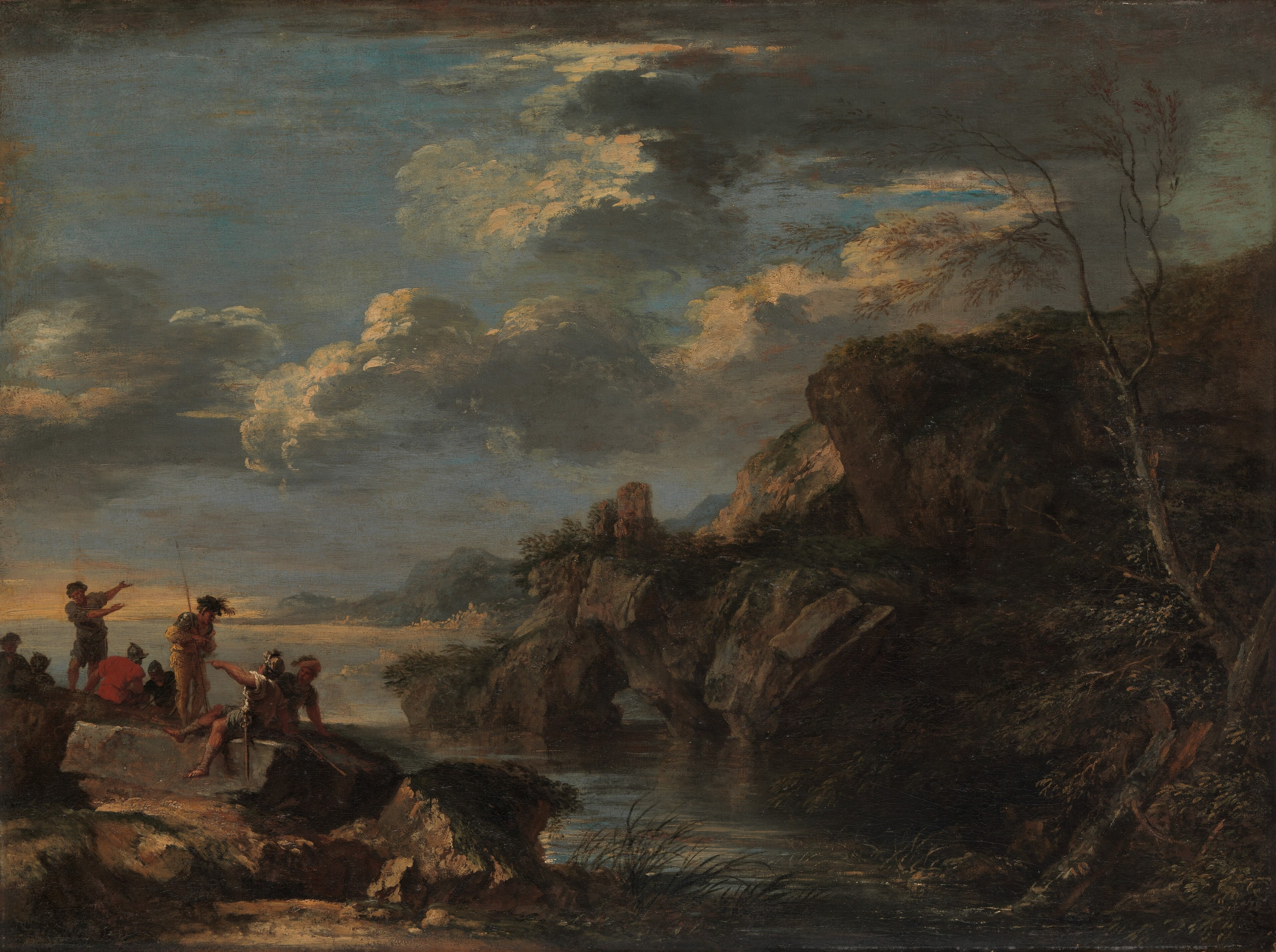
Salvator Rosa's "Bandits on a Rocky Coast", painted between 1655 and 1660. Rosa's landscapes influenced Radcliffe's novels.

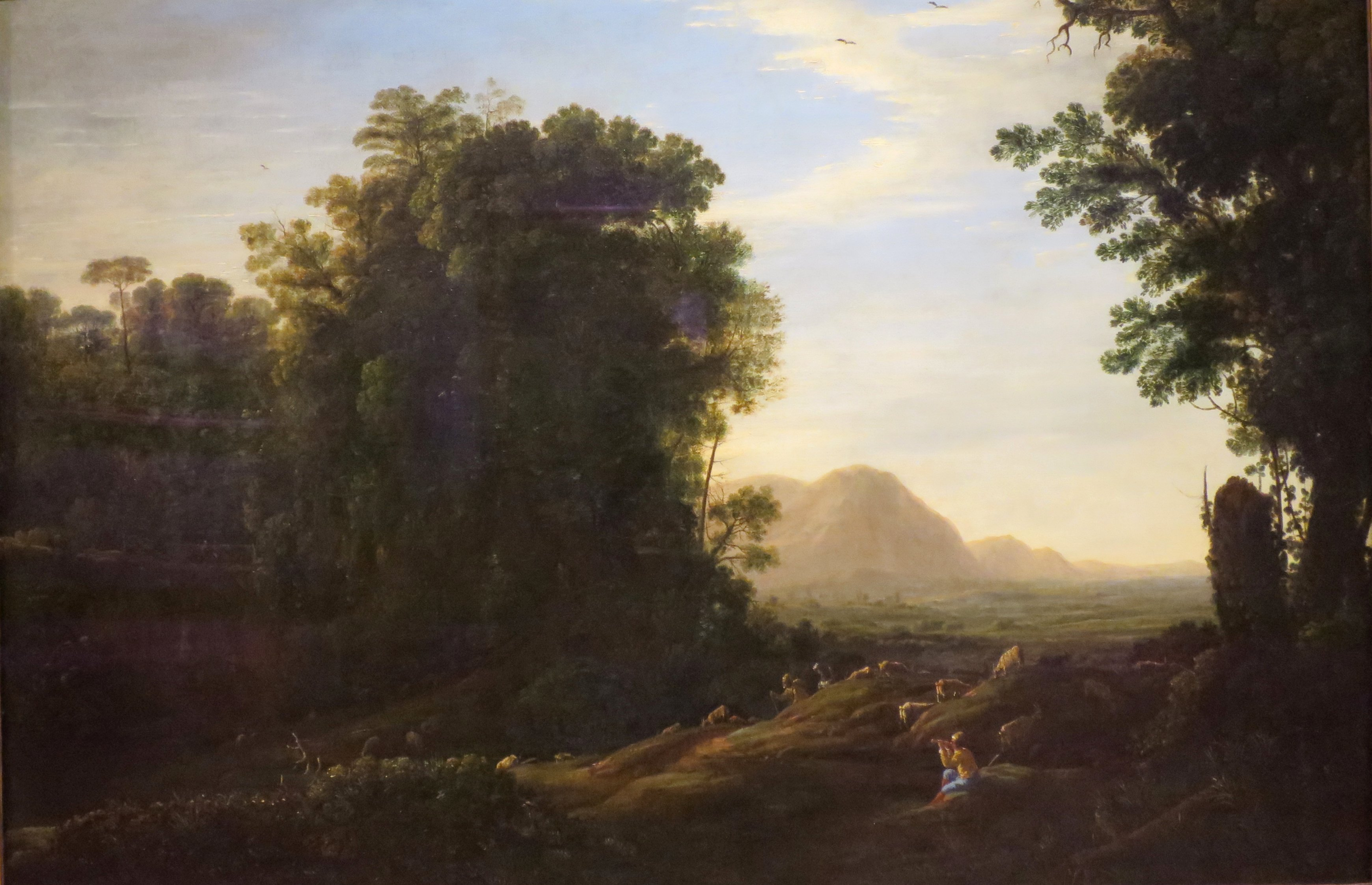
Claude Lorrain's "Landscape with a Piping Shepherd", painted between 1629 and 1632. Lorrain was also a visual influence on Radcliffe's novels.

Radcliffe's novels often used landscape descriptions to reinforce the emotional impact of the story. These descriptions are typically hazy and atmospheric, rather than topologically accurate to the novel's setting. Her descriptions of landscape were particularly influenced by the painters Claude Lorrain, Nicolas Poussin, and Salvator Rosa. Her contemporary Nathan Drake said that her novels combined "the softer graces of a Claude" with "the wild landscape of Salvator Rosa". Radcliffe's uncle had an extensive collection of landscape paintings and illustrations, chiefly focused on ruins and picturesque views, which would have been familiar to her.

One assessment emphasised these landscapes as key to Radcliffe's literary success: "She was, indeed, a prose poet, in both the best and the worst senses of the phrase. The romantic landscape, the background, is the best thing in all her books; the characters are two dimensional, the plots far fetched and improbable, with 'elaboration of means and futility of result'." Her literary landscapes also formed part of her legacy, as some literary historians credit her with popularising "the convention of atmospheric 'scene'" which became prominent in nineteenth-century fiction.

=== Anti-Catholicism ===
Radcliffe's work have been considered by some scholars to be part of a larger tradition of anti-Catholicism within Gothic literature; her works contain hostile portrayals of both Catholicism and Catholics. The Italian frequently presents Catholicism, the largest religion in Italy, in a negative light. The Inquisition is a major villain of the novel, and Radcliffe portrays the confessional as a "danger zone" controlled by the power of the priest and the church. The Mysteries of Udolpho also contained negative portrayals of Catholicism, which was presented as part of the "ancient Italianess" of their dangerous Italian settings. Italy, along with its Catholicism, had been featured in earlier Gothic literature; the preface to Horace Walpole's novel The Castle of Otranto (1764) claimed that the novel was "found in the library of an ancient catholic family in the north of England" and "printed at Naples, in the black letter, in the year 1529". Some scholars have suggested that Radcliffe's anti-Catholicism was partly a response to the 1791 Roman Catholic Relief Act passed by the British parliament, which was a major component of Catholic emancipation in Great Britain. Other scholars have suggested that Radcliffe was ultimately ambivalent towards Catholicism, interpreting her views as Latitudinarian.

== Legacy ==
=== Influence on later writers ===
I have read all Mrs. Radcliffe's works, and most of them with great pleasure. The Mysteries of Udolpho, when I had once begun it, I could not lay down again;—I remember finishing it in two days—my hair standing on end the whole time.

— Henry Tilney in Northanger Abbey (1817) by Jane Austen

Nearly every writer of Gothic fiction can be said to be influenced by Radcliffe, who was almost synonymous with the genre, which was, during her lifetime, known as the "Radcliffe school" of fiction. Some Gothic novels were written beginning in 1764, but it was Radcliffe's popularity which inspired large numbers of new entries in the genre. Contemporary critics called her a "mighty enchantress" and the Shakespeare of romance-writers. She was well-known for inspiring a large number of imitators, as well as parodies. The literary historian Michael Gamer credits Radcliffe with inventing a new art form, "the psychological novel of suspense and the supernatural". This echoes Walter Scott's assessment in 1821 that Radcliffe belonged "among the favoured few who have been distinguished as the founders of a class, or school".

Writers who followed in Radcliffe's lead include Harriet Lee (1757–1851) and Catherine Cuthbertson (1775–1842). The writers Matthew Lewis (1775–1818) and the Marquis de Sade (1740–1814) also took inspiration from her work but produced more intensely violent fiction. Jane Austen (1775–1817) parodied The Mysteries of Udolpho in Northanger Abbey (1817), and she defined her realistic fiction as a contrast to Radcliffe's Gothic school. Radcliffe also influenced Romanticism, especially the Romantic writers Mary Shelley (1797–1851) and Lord Byron (1788–1824). The poets William Wordsworth and Samuel Taylor Coleridge wrote about her in their letters.

In the early nineteenth century, Radcliffe particularly influenced Walter Scott (1771–1832), known for his Waverley series of historical novels. Scott used romanticised historical settings and interspersed his work with poems in a similar manner to Radcliffe. Later in the nineteenth century, the Gothic writers Charlotte (1816–1855) and Emily Brontë (1818–1848) continued Radcliffe's tradition with their novels Jane Eyre, Villette, and Wuthering Heights. She also influenced Charles Dickens, William Makepeace Thackeray, Edgar Allan Poe, and Nathaniel Hawthorne.

Radcliffe was admired by French authors including Honoré de Balzac (1799–1850), Victor Hugo (1802–1885), Alexandre Dumas (1802–1870), George Sand (1804-1876), and Charles Baudelaire (1821–1867). Honoré de Balzac's novel of the supernatural L'Héritière de Birague (1822) follows and parodies Radcliffe's style. In 1849, Mary Russell Mitford described the French admiration for Radcliffe in a letter:

The only one whom they appear really to appreciate is Mrs. Radcliffe ... It is quite amusing to see how much a writer, wellnigh forgotten in England, is admired in France. I dare say, now, you never read a page of her novels, and yet such critics as Ste.-Beuve, such poets as Victor Hugo, such novelists as Balzac and George Sand, to say nothing of a thousand inferior writers, talk of her in raptures. I will venture to say that she is quoted fifty times where Scott is quoted once.

As a child, Fyodor Dostoyevsky was deeply impressed by Radcliffe. In Winter Notes on Summer Impressions (1863) he writes, "I used to spend the long winter hours before bed listening (for I could not yet read), agape with ecstasy and terror, as my parents read aloud to me from the novels of Ann Radcliffe. Then I would rave deliriously about them in my sleep." A number of scholars have noted elements of Gothic literature in Dostoyevsky's novels, and some have tried to show direct influence of Radcliffe's work.

Radcliffe's influence as a writer waned in the twentieth century. She was excluded from histories of the novel, and sometimes mocked as an unintentionally humorous writer. Nonetheless, by the 1990s all of her novels were back in print, and in 2024 The Cambridge Edition of the Works of Ann Radcliffe was announced – the first scholarly edition of her complete works, due to be published from 2025 to 2028.

=== Biographies ===
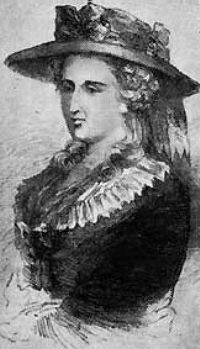
Imagined portrait of Ann Radcliffe, published after her death in J.S. Pratt's 1853 edition of The Romance of the Forest

Several biographies have been written about Radcliffe, but all face the same problems of limited source material. Radcliffe's journals are no longer extant, though a few excerpts were published shortly after her death. Only three documents directly related to Radcliffe could be located by the bibliographer Deborah D. Rogers in 1996: her forty-two page commonplace book, a note to someone named Miss Williamson, (Note: This note says only, "My Dear Miss Williamson, The carriage is at door, and I have only time to say, that the books are arrived, and that we shall have great pleasure in seeing you on Wednesday. Pray come early, that we may have a ride. Sincerely Yours, A. Radcliffe) and her original contract for Udolpho. Since then, a letter to her mother-in-law has also been found.

Walter Scott published a brief "Prefatory memoir" about Radcliffe in 1824, as part of The Novels of Mrs. Ann Radcliffe in the Ballantyne Novelist's Library series. The best-known biography of Radcliffe was published as a preface to some of her posthumous works in 1826. It was written by Thomas Noon Talfourd, using extracts from Radcliffe's journals and information provided by her widower. Early biographical accounts of Radcliffe typically emphasised her illustrious distant relatives over her close relatives, who were in trade, as part of cultivating a genteel and ladylike reputation for her. Christina Rossetti attempted to write a biography of Radcliffe in 1883, but abandoned it for lack of information.

Two full-length biographies were published in the mid twentieth century: Aline Grant's Ann Radcliffe: A Biography (1951) and Pierre Arnaud's Ann Radcliffe et le fantisque: essai de psychobiographie (1976). Rictor Norton, author of Mistress of Udolpho: The Life of Ann Radcliffe (1999), argues that these years were "dominated by interpretation rather than scholarship" and that information (specifically on her rumoured madness) was repeated rather than traced to a reliable source. Deborah D. Rogers included a twenty-page summary of Radcliffe's life in Ann Radcliffe: A Bio-Bibliography (1996), combining information from Talfourd with Radcliffe's commonplace book. Norton's 1999 biography, more than ten times the length, incorporates archival materials related to Radcliffe's many relatives, as well as public discussion of her reputation, to expand on the context for her life.

=== Fictional depictions ===
In 1875, Paul Féval wrote a story starring Radcliffe as a vampire hunter, titled La Ville Vampire: Adventure Incroyable de Madame Anne Radcliffe ("City of Vampires: The Incredible Adventure of Mrs. Anne Radcliffe"), which blends fiction and history.

Helen McCrory plays Ann Radcliffe in the 2007 film Becoming Jane, starring Anne Hathaway as Jane Austen. The film depicts Radcliffe meeting the young Jane Austen and encouraging her to pursue a literary career.

== Bibliography ==
=== Gothic novels ===
- The Castles of Athlin and Dunbayne (1789) - set in the 14th or 15th century
- A Sicilian Romance (1790) - set at the close of the 16th century (1590s)
- The Romance of the Forest (1791) - set in the mid-17th century, especially 1658
- The Mysteries of Udolpho (1794) - set in 1584
- The Italian or the Confessional of the Black Penitents (1797) - set in 1758-64
- Gaston de Blondeville or the Court of Henry III Keeping Festival in Ardenne (written c. 1802, published posthumously 1826) - set in the mid-13th century, especially 1256

=== Poetry ===
==== Narrative poems ====
- Salisbury Plains: Stonehenge (written c. 1801-1812, published posthumously 1826) – a narrative poem in 66 stanzas
- Edwy: A Poem (1826) – a short Gothic epic poem in 3 Cantos
- St. Alban's Abbey, A Metrical Tale (written c. 1808, published posthumously 1826) – a Gothic epic poem in 10 Cantos

==== Collections ====
- The Poems of Mrs. Ann Radcliffe (London: Printed by and for J. Smith, 1816) – an unauthorised anthology of poems which previously appeared in her novels
- The Poetical Works of Ann Radcliffe (1834) – an independent reissue of the last two volumes of the four-volume 1826 collection of her posthumous works; contains all her poetic works

=== Travelogue ===
- A Journey Made in the Summer of 1794 (1795)
