= Gaston de Blondeville =

1826 novel by Ann Radcliffe

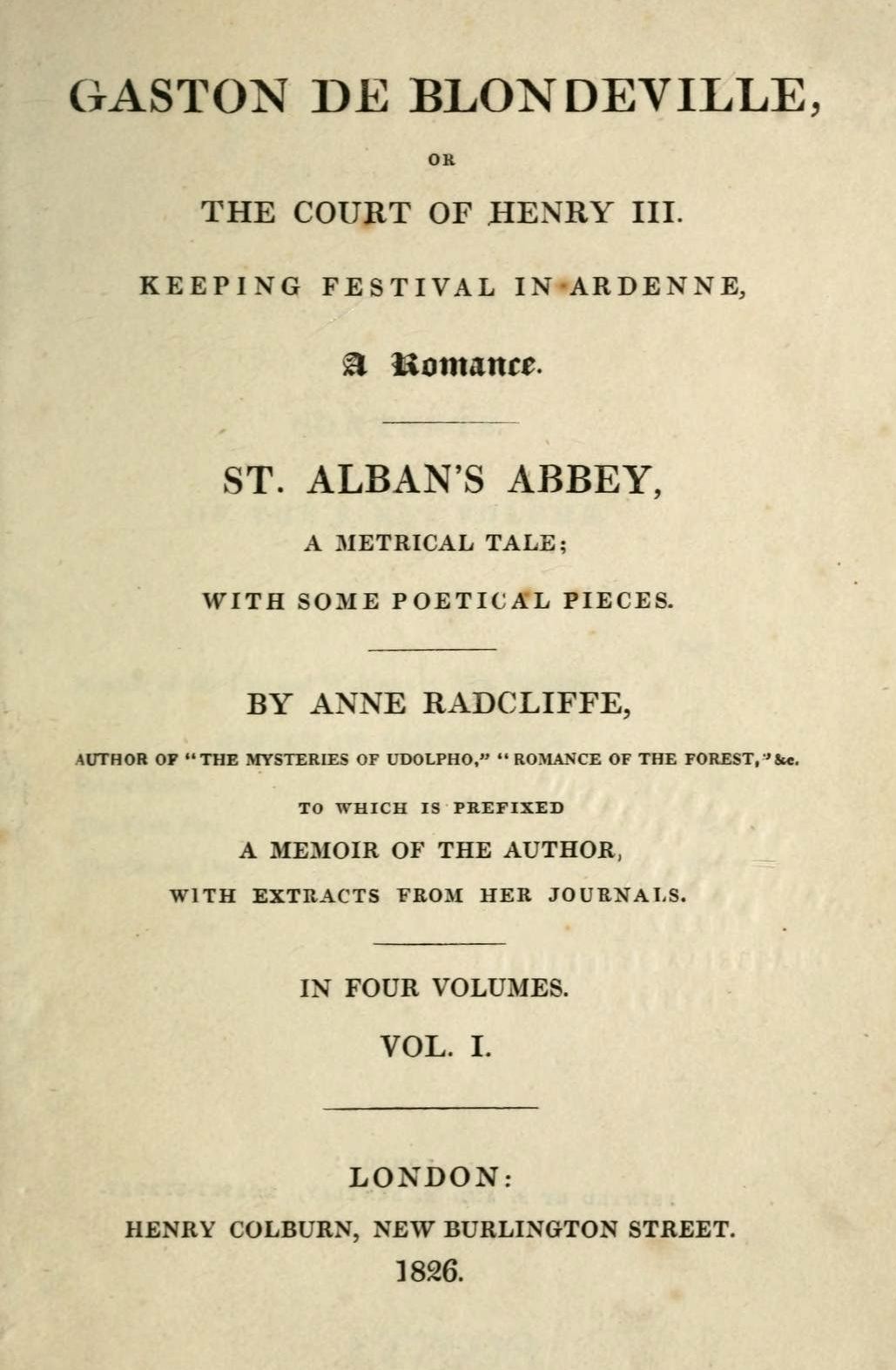
- First edition title page
- Author: Ann Radcliffe
- Language: English
- Genre: Gothic, historical novel
- Publisher: Henry Colburn
- Publication date: 1826
- Publication place: United Kingdom
- Media type: Print (Hardback & Paperback)

Gaston de Blondeville is a Gothic novel by noted English author Ann Radcliffe, published posthumously in 1826, three years after Radcliffe's death. Its full title is Gaston de Blondeville: Or, The Court of Henry III. Keeping Festival in Ardenne, A Romance.

== Plot summary ==
Set in the 13th-century court of England's King Henry III, the novel centres around the wedding of the title character. The wedding is interrupted by a merchant who claims to have been wronged by Gaston, in that Gaston murdered his kinsman. Henry is forced to hold a trial to determine the validity of the claims. The plot is further complicated by the machinations of an abbot who tries to suppress the truth, and by ghosts who want to expose the truth.

== Prefix ==
The novel was published by Henry Colburn. The first volume begins with A memoir of the Author, with Extracts from her Journal, which is the first known biography of Mrs. Radcliffe. Rictor Norton notes that this work "was written three years after her death by a man who never met her, using material supplied solely by her husband and his own intuition".

== Review ==
The book is described as "drawn out and sometimes rambling, the plot lacking in impetus", but is notable as being the last novel to be both written (circa 1802) and published (in 1826, posthumously) by Radcliffe. The book is noteworthy for its detailed descriptions of locations.
