= Thomas Hookham =

Thomas Hookham (c.1739–1819) was a bookseller and publisher in London in the 18th–19th centuries. He issued works by Charlotte de Bournon, John Hassell, Pierre-Jean-Baptiste Nougaret, Ann Radcliffe, Clara Reeve, and others. As part of his business he ran a circulating library, established in 1764 and by the 1800s one of "the two largest in London." (Note: Competitors included circulating libraries of John Bell, John Boosey, John Booth, Carpenter, Cawthorn, Cheesewright, Creighton, Thomas Dangerfield, Dutton, William Earle, William Lane, John Noble, David Ogilvy, Parson, Tegg, and Thomas Vernor.) The library continued on Bond Street until it was acquired by Mudie's ca.1871. In addition, about 1794 he opened the Literary Assembly subscription reading rooms stocked with periodicals and reference books.

His sons, Thomas Hookham, Jr. (1787–1867) and Edward T. Hookham also worked as publishers and booksellers in London. A third generation, Thomas Hookham and Henry Hookham, continued in the business into the mid 19th century.
