= The Mysteries of Udolpho =

1794 novel by Ann Radcliffe

The Mysteries of Udolpho, A Romance; Interspersed with Some Pieces of Poetry
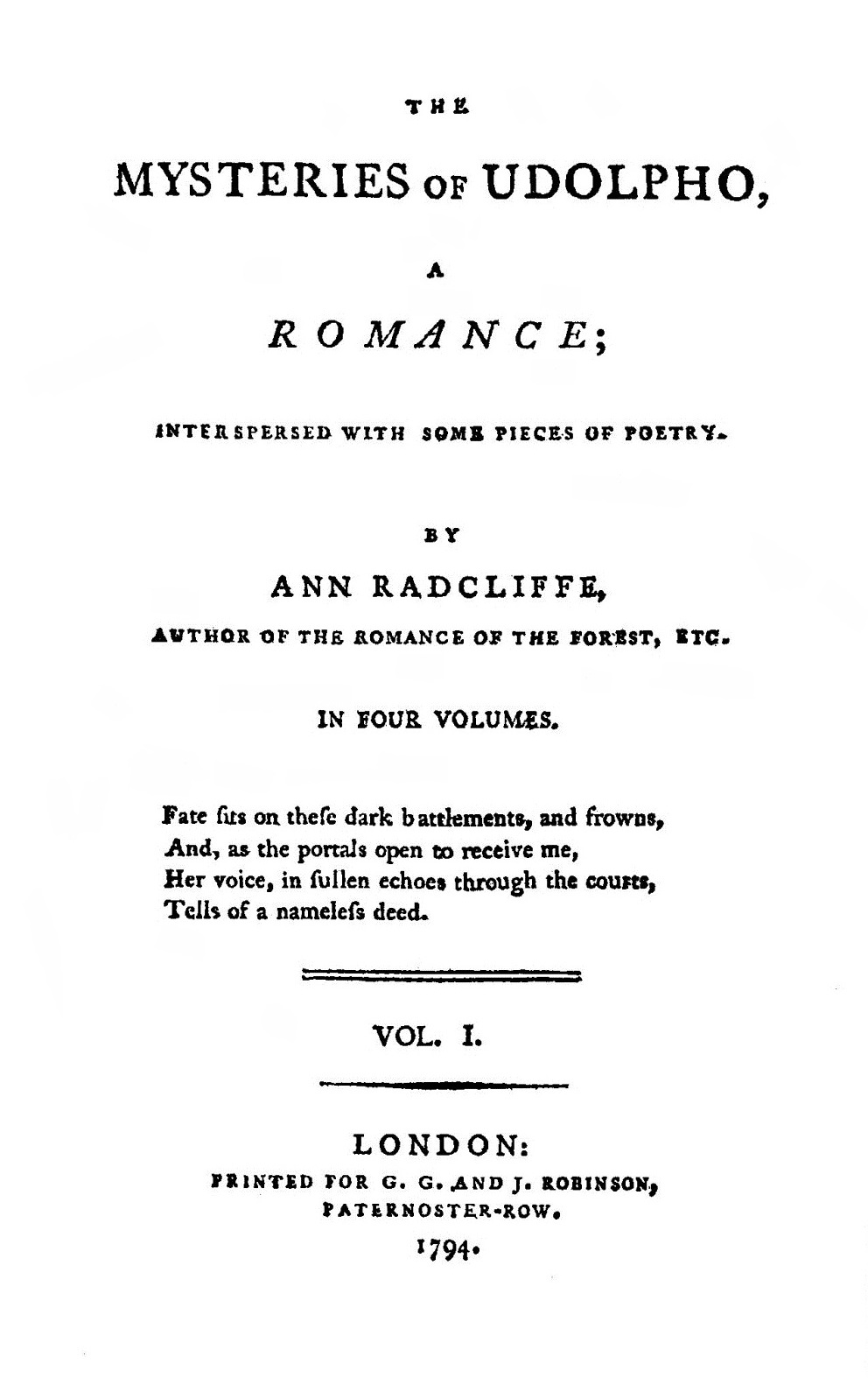
- Title page from first edition
- Author: Ann Radcliffe
- Language: English
- Genre: Gothic novel
- Publisher: G. G. and J. Robinson
- Publication date: 8 May 1794
- Publication place: England
- Pages: 428 (vol. 1) ... 428 (vol. 4) – 1794 edition
- Text: The Mysteries of Udolpho, A Romance; Interspersed with Some Pieces of Poetry at Wikisource

The Mysteries of Udolpho: A Romance is a Gothic novel by Ann Radcliffe, which appeared in four volumes on 8 May 1794 from G. G. and J. Robinson of London. Her fourth and most popular novel, The Mysteries of Udolpho tells of Emily St. Aubert, who suffers misadventures that include the death of her mother and father, supernatural terrors in a gloomy castle, and machinations of Italian brigand Signor Montoni. It is often cited as an archetypal example of the Gothic novel.

The popularity of The Mysteries of Udolpho helped cement the Gothic novel as a distinct genre, and has inspired many imitators since publication. It was a notable point of reference in Jane Austen's Northanger Abbey, which both satirises and pays homage to Gothic literature.

== Plot ==
=== Volume 1 ===
In 1584, Emily St. Aubert is the only child of a landed rural family in Gascony. Emily and her father share a close bond over their shared appreciation for nature. Overwhelmed with grief after the death of her mother, they take a journey for M. St. Aubert's health through the Pyrenees to the coast of Roussillon, over many mountainous landscapes. During the journey, they encounter Valancourt, a handsome man who also feels a kinship with the natural world. Emily and Valancourt fall in love. While staying in a rural village in Languedoc, Emily's father dies and is interred at the nearby monastery of St. Claire. Emily's curiosity is piqued by her father's apparent familiarity with the monastery and a purportedly haunted manor nearby.

Upon returning to her home in La Vallée, Emily fulfills her father's dying wishes by destroying some hidden documents whose contents shock her. She also finds a miniature portrait of an unknown woman, which she once witnessed her father cry over. Now orphaned, Emily's guardianship falls to her aunt, Madame Cheron, who shares none of Emily's interests and shows little affection for her. While in her household in Toulouse, Emily and Valancourt become engaged, but at their intended wedding Madame Cheron marries Montoni, a dubious nobleman from Italy. Montoni moves the family to his home in Venice, interrupting Emily and Valancourt's courtship and promoting the suit of his friend Count Morano instead. After discovering that Count Morano is not as wealthy as he seems, Montoni brings Emily and her aunt to his remote castle of Udolpho.

=== Volume 2 ===
Udolpho is an inhospitable environment, where Montoni is gathering condottieri for a violent scheme. Emily is frequently frightened by strange sounds and sights, and a mysterious door in her bedroom. Emily and Madame Montoni's servant, Annette, become aware of a room with a black veil drawn over something. Annette recounts a ghost story about the former owner of the castle, Signora Laurentini di Udolpho, whose mysterious disappearance allowed Montoni to acquire the castle. Later, Emily lifts the black veil out of curiosity, and is traumatized by what she sees. Count Morano tries to abduct Emily from Udolpho through a secret passage leading to her bedroom's mysterious door. He is discovered by Montoni, who wounds the Count and chases him away. In subsequent months, Montoni threatens his wife, trying to force her to sign over her properties in Toulouse to him. Someone attempts to poison Montoni; he accuses Madame Montoni and imprisons her in a turret. There, she dies of a severe illness, and Emily inherits her property.

=== Volume 3 ===
Montoni now harasses Emily to sign the estate over to him, employing a range of tricks and threats. Eventually, Emily manages to flee with the help of Annette and Annette's lover, Ludovico. While escaping, they free a prisoner, Du Pont, who was a neighbour of Emily, as well as a secret admirer of hers. Making their way to the coast, they board a ship bound for Marseille.

=== Volume 4 ===
The ship is wrecked at Languedoc near the village where Emily's father died. They are taken in by Count de Villefort and his family at Chateau-le-Blanc, a manor rumoured to be haunted. Emily befriends the daughter, Blanche. Emily is invited by the abbess of the monastery to board at the convent and she divides her time between the monastery and the chateau. Valancourt arrives, but fears that he has become unworthy of Emily's love. Count de Villefort privately informs Emily that while Valancourt was in Paris, he became a degenerate gambler: he associated with a woman of poor morals, cheated at cards, and lost much of his wealth. Horrified, Emily rejects Valancourt; equally distraught, he leaves.

The Chateau-le-Blanc housekeeper, Dorothée, continually compares Emily's appearance to the former lady of the chateau, the Marchioness de Villeroi, and realises that she is depicted in the miniature that Emily kept from her father's items. When Dorothée takes Emily to see a larger picture of the lady in a closed-off section of the chateau, a ghostly figure rises from the bed and they flee in terror. After the rest of the household hears of the encounter, Ludovico volunteers to spend the night in the room to disprove the existence of any ghost. The next morning, Ludovico has vanished.

Emily returns to Toulouse and establishes herself as the new owner of her aunt's estate. She thinks she sees Valancourt walking in her garden. Another night, the gardener shoots an apparent robber, who was not caught but left behind blood; Emily is despondent that Valancourt may have been killed.

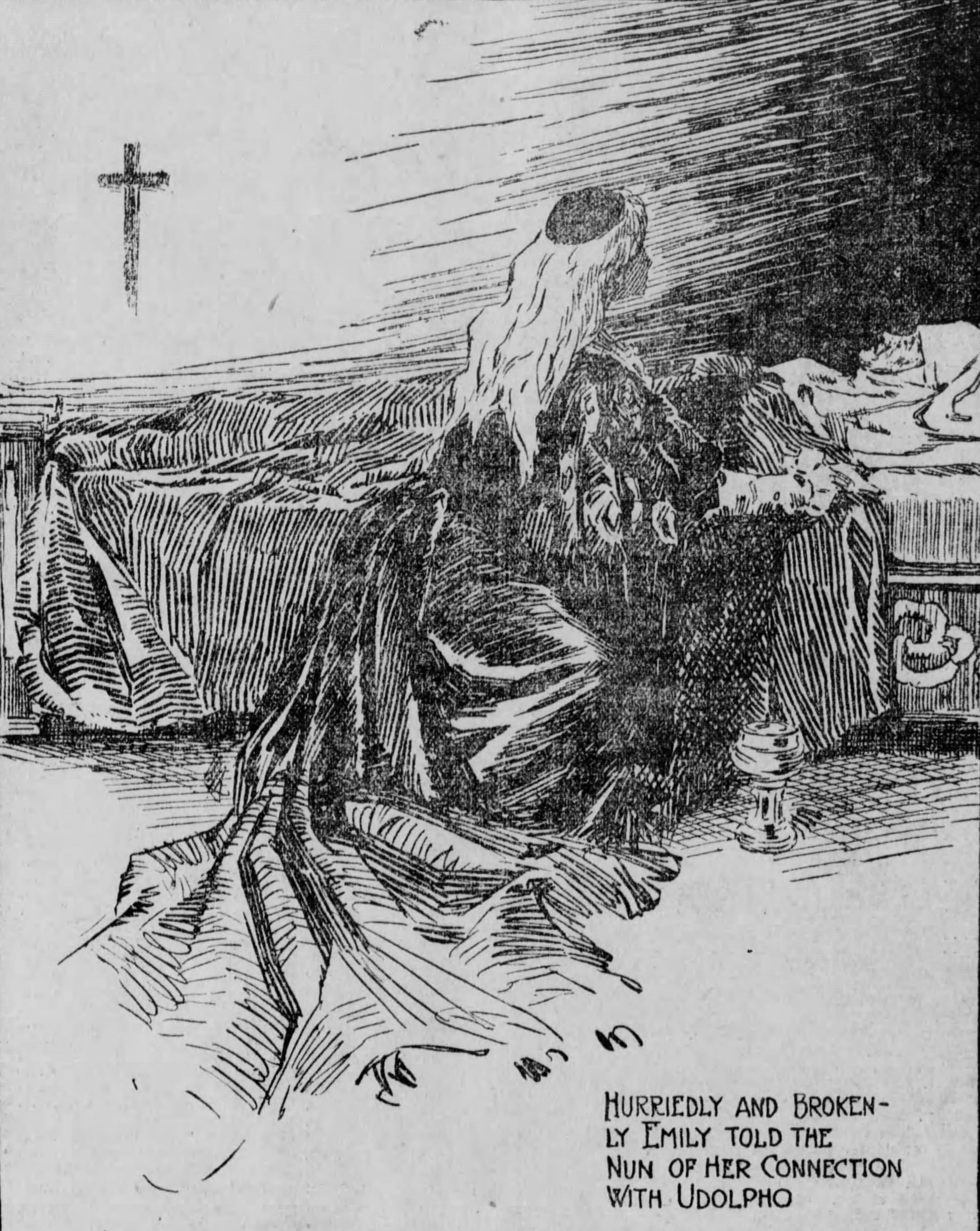
Newspaper illustration from abridged version of The Mysteries of Udolpho, 1907

Meanwhile, Count de Villefort, Blanche, and Blanche's fiancé, the Chevalier St. Foix, travel across the Pyrenees to visit Emily. They shelter at a watchtower inhabited by a group of purported hunters, but discover that they are banditti. The group is imprisoned, and St. Foix severely wounded. They are rescued by Ludovico and escape. At Toulouse, Ludovico explains that he was abducted by pirates who (due to the chateau's proximity to the sea) had been secretly using the abandoned sector of the chateau as a treasure vault while convincing the surrounding areas that the house was haunted. They sent him to the watchtower as a prisoner and he spent several weeks there until the de Villefort party arrived. He additionally explains that one of the pirates had been the ghostly figure Emily and Dorothée had seen.

Having returned to Languedoc, Emily visits a troubled nun, Sister Agnes, who is dying and wants to see Emily. She enters a delirious frenzy, believing Emily a ghost. Once she calms down, she shows Emily a portrait and Emily realises that Sister Agnes is the missing Signora Laurentini di Udolpho. When Emily mentions the castle, Laurentini enters another delirious state and dies the next day.

The Count de Villefort learns the truth of Valancourt's activities in Paris: Valancourt did accrue gambling debts, but was morally reformed by his stint in debtor's prison. On his release, he used all of his wealth to benevolently free a fellow indebted prisoner (Monsieur Bonnac), and gave up gambling. He was never guilty of the greater sins attributed to him by rumour. The Count invites Valancourt to Languedoc to resume his romance with Emily. Meanwhile, Emily learns Laurentini's full backstory from the abbess: Laurentini fled Udolpho to join the Marquis de Villeroi (former owner of Chateau-le-Blanc) in an illicit romance. She persuaded him to poison his wife, who is revealed to have been M. St. Aubert's sister (author of the letters Emily had burned); his grief was too intense to ever speak of her. After her death, the Marquis and Laurentini were wracked with guilt; he died, and Laurentini changed her name and entered a convent. The horrible sight behind the black veil -- which Emily feared was Laurentini's rotting corpse -- was in fact a wax figure of a corpse, created as part of a medieval penance for a former owner of Udolpho.

Valancourt joyously reunites with Emily. They marry in a double wedding with Blanche and St. Foix, then settle happily at La Vallée.

== Characters ==
- Emily St. Aubert: Much of the action takes place from Emily's point of view. She has a deep appreciation of the sublimity of nature, shared with her father. She is unusually beautiful and gentle with a slight, graceful figure, fond of books, nature, poetry and music. She is described as virtuous, obedient, resourceful, brave, sensitive, and self-reliant. Her childhood home is La Vallée. Her sensitivity leads her to dwell (often in tears) on past misfortunes and imagine with dread troubles that may befall her. She is given to writing verse, selections of which punctuate the novel.
- Monsieur St. Aubert: Emily's father, he dies early in the novel while he, Emily and Valancourt are travelling. He warns Emily on his death bed not to become a victim of her feelings, but to acquire command over her emotions. His unaccountable relationship with the Marchioness de Villeroi is one of the novel's mysteries.
- Valancourt, younger brother of the Count Duvarney, Valancourt forms an attachment to Emily while travelling with her and her father through the Pyrenees. He is a dashing, enthusiastic young man with a noble character, on furlough from the army when he meets her. St. Aubert sees Valancourt as a desirable match for Emily, although he lacks wealth.
- Madame Cheron (later Madame Montoni) is St. Aubert's sister and Emily's aunt. She is a selfish, worldly, vain, wealthy widow living on her estate near Toulouse, when Emily becomes her ward after St. Aubert's death. She is contemptuous and cold, even cruel to Emily at first, thinking solely of herself, but near her death, she softens slightly to Emily, who patiently aids and comforts her.
- Montoni is a prototypical Gothic villain. Brooding, haughty and scheming, he masquerades as an Italian nobleman to gain Madame Cheron's hand in marriage, then imprisons Emily and Madame Cheron in Udolpho in an attempt to take control of Madame Cheron's wealth and estates. He is cold and often cruel to Emily, who believes him to be a captain of banditti.
- Count Morano is introduced to Emily by Montoni, who commands that she marry him. Emily refuses, but Morano still pursues her in Venice and later Udolpho. When Montoni finds that Count Morano is not as rich as he hoped, he abruptly withdraws his support from the suit. Morano tries twice to abduct Emily, but both attempts fail.
- Annette, a maid who has accompanied Madame Cheron from France, is talkative and inclined to exaggeration and superstition, but faithful, affectionate and honest. She is in love with Ludovico and often gets locked in closets.
- Ludovico, one of Montoni's servants, falls in love with Annette and provides assistance to Emily. He is more sensible than Annette, and is brave and quick-thinking. He is the one who locks the closets.
- Cavigni, Verezzi, and Bertolini are cavaliers and friends of Montoni. Cavigini is sly, careful, and flatteringly assiduous. Verezzi is a "man of some talent, of fiery imagination, and the slave of alternate passions. He was gay, voluptuous, and daring; yet had neither perseverance or true courage, and was meanly selfish in all his aims." Bertolini is brave, unsuspecting, merry, dissipated and markedly extravagant. His flightiness to Emily distresses her.
- Orsino, an assassin described as the "chief favourite" of Montoni, is cruel, suspicious, merciless and relentlessly vengeful.
- Marchioness de Villeroi is a mysterious figure whose miniature Emily finds in a secret panel in her father's closet. She was married to Marquis de Villeroi, but becomes estranged from him and dies through the intervention of Laurentini di Udolpho. She was a sister to M. St. Aubert, and thereby Emily's aunt.
- Signora Laurentini di Udolpho (also called Sister Agnes) is a nun in the French monastery of St. Claire. She dies in the final volume of the novel, whereupon she is revealed to be Signora Laurentini, heiress of the house of Udolpho. She has estranged the Marquis de Villeroi, her first love, from his wife, after which she retires to the monastery to live in guilt. She divides her fortune between Emily and the wife of M. Bonnac.
- The Marquis de Villeroi was the lover of Laurentini before he married the Marchioness. He leaves the Chateau-le-Blanc after her death.
- Francis Beauveau, Count De Villefort is heir to the mansion at Chateau-le-Blanc in Languedoc. He inherits it from his friend the Marquis de Villeroi. He has two children by a previous marriage, Blanche and Henri, and is married to the Countess De Villefort.
- Lady Blanche, a sweet young woman with a deep appreciation of the sublime, who writes poetry, resides at Chateau-le-Blanc and befriends Emily, with whom she shares many interests.
- Dorothée, a servant at the Chateau-le-Blanc, is superstitious like Annette, but less inclined to be found in a closet.
- Monsieur Du Pont is one of Emily's suitors. He steals a portrait miniature of Emily belonging to her mother, which he later returns. He helps Emily and her companions escape from Udolpho. He is a friend of De Villefort, who supports his suit. When Emily steadfastly rejects him, he turns his attentions to Blanche, but is thwarted again when she marries St. Foix.
- Monsieur Quesnel, Emily's uncle, is cold and unfeeling towards Emily until she becomes an heiress.
- Madame Clairval, Valancourt's aunt and an acquaintance of Madame Cheron, initially approves of the match between Valancourt and Emily, but finally decides there are better prospects for both of them.
- Monsieur Bonnac, an officer in the French service about 50 years old, Emily meets at the convent. His wife inherits Castle Udolpho.
- Monsieur St. Foix, suitor of Blanche, marries her at the end of the novel.

== Publication ==
The Mysteries of Udolpho was published by the radical bookseller George Robinson's company G. G. and J. Robinson at 25, Paternoster Row, in the City of London. The Robinsons paid her £500 for the manuscript and later also published her A Journey Made in the Summer of 1794.

== Reception and influence ==
In August 1794, The Critical Review published a review of The Mysteries of Udolpho praising it as "the most interesting novel in the English language", but also criticising the novel's excessive descriptions and anticlimactic ending. Some scholars attribute the review to Samuel Taylor Coleridge, though others dispute this assessment.

Modern critics have noted the influence of The Mysteries of Udolpho on the works of many later writers, including Edgar Allan Poe, John Keats, and Henry James.

=== Adaptations ===
- The Veiled Picture; or, The Mysteries of Gorgono (1802) is a chapbook abridgement of it, preserving most characters and plot elements but dispensing with details and descriptions.
- BBC Radio 4 has broadcast two adaptations. The first is a 1996 two-part version by Catherine Czerkawska starring Deborah Berlin as Emily and Robert Glenister. The second is a 2016 one-hour piece by Hattie Naylor with Georgia Groome as Emily.
- In 2007, The Mysteries of Udolpho appeared as a graphic novel in the Gothic Classics: Graphic Classics series.
- A dramatisation by Carole Diffey was published in July 2015.

=== References in other works ===
- The novel is a focus of attention in Jane Austen's 1817 novel Northanger Abbey, which both satirizes and pays homage to it.
- In Walter Scott's novel Waverley (1814), Scott humorously references Udolpho in the introductory chapter while meditating appropriate subtitles for Waverley.
- The epigraph to the novel, written by Radcliffe herself; "Fate sits on these dark battlements, and frowns,.." is quoted in full by Washington Irving in his Tales of the Alhambra (1832), noting that the lines "used to thrill me in the days of boyhood".
- The Castle of Udolpho is mentioned in a letter from Rebecca Sharp to Miss Sedley in William Thackeray's 1848 novel Vanity Fair.
- The Castle of Udolpho is mentioned in the defense attorney's speech in Fyodor Dostoevsky's 1880 novel The Brothers Karamazov.
- In series 1 episode 12 ("Homefront") of Young Justice, the Mysteries of Udolpho was the book used to open a secret passage in the League's library. Several characters in the series are seen reading it.
- In Henry James's 1898 novel The Turn of the Screw, the second sentence in Chapter 4 reads: "Was there a 'secret' at Bly – a mystery of Udolpho or an insane, an unmentionable relative kept in unsuspected confinement?"
- In Anthony Trollope's Framley Parsonage (1860), a room for interviewing debtors at the London office of solicitors Gumption & Gazebee is likened to the torture chamber at Castle Udolpho.
- In Edgar Allan Poe's short story "The Oval Portrait" (1842), "Mrs. Radcliffe" is mentioned in an allusion to The Mysteries of Udolpho.
- In Emily of New Moon by Lucy Maud Montgomery, Emily mentions having read The Mysteries of Udolpho when exploring her aunt's strange, "gothic" house.
- In Herman Melville's novella Billy Budd, Sailor (1924) the narrator says that an incident "is in its very realism as much charged with that prime element of Radcliffian romance, the mysterious, as any that the ingenuity of the author of the Mysteries of Udolpho could devise".
- In Frances Eleanor Trollope's That Unfortunate Marriage (1888), "And may one ask where she is? It is not, I presume a Mystery of Udolpho!"
