= Cajetan Tschink =

Austrian writer and philosopher (1763–1813)

Cajetan Tschink (22 April 1763 – 26 August 1813) was an Austrian writer, philosopher, and professor whose literary work primarily focused on skepticism of the supernatural. His most prominent work was the Gothic novel Geschichte eines Geistersehers. Aus den Papieren des Mannes mit der eisernen Larve, translated into English by Peter Will as The Victim of Magical Delusion.

== Biography ==
Cajetan Tschink was born on 22 April 1763 in Vienna. He was of Hungarian background. Tschink joined the Carmelite Order in 1780, but left before receiving his ordination and in 1792 attended the University of Jena to study philosophy. Tschink's philosophical focus was the work of Immanuel Kant, and he held a position as professor of philosophy at the University in Olmütz (modern day Olomouc, Czech Republic) where he taught and wrote on logic, metaphysics, and practical philosophy. He stayed in this position until his death on 26 August 1813.

== Genre and style ==
Tschink worked within the Gothic fiction genre that was popular in Germany in the 1790s. He was an early adopter of the Gothic form of Geisterseherroman ("Necromancer novel" lit. ghost-seer novel"), which was invented by Friedrich Schiller with his unfinished 1789 novel Der Geisterseher. Geisterseherroman is characterized by fraudsters and charlatans trick the gullible by using seemingly supernatural means, the machinations of which are revealed to the audience to have mundane explanations through phantasmagoria-style stage effects such as trap doors, hidden mirrors, translucent veils, and pyrotechnics, and through technologies such as the moving panorama, eidophusikon, and magic lantern.

Tschink's most prominent novel was Geschichte eines Geistersehers. Aus den Papieren des Mannes mit der eisernen Larve, which was translated into English by Peter Will as The Victim of Magical Delusion. The novel describes supposed spiritual apparitions that are shown to be images produced by a simple magic lantern projector. The various tricks presented are performed by a mysterious figure called Alumbrado (a reference to the Alumbrados, a Spanish mystic sect suppressed by the Inquisition) who makes miracles to convince people God speaks and acts through him, serving his ends of an Illuminati conspiracy.

Much of Tschink's work is didactic, with clear lessons, where the credulous characters are mocked for falling for the delusions. This contrasts with the fact that the popularity of the Gothic genre comes from incredulous elements, and relied on them for sales.

The quick adoption of Geisterseherroman by Tschink was followed by other imitations of Schiller, including Karl Friedrich Kahlert's Der Geisterbanner [The Necromancer], Carl Grosse's Der Genius [Horrid Mysteries], G. Bücher's Der Geisterseher. Eine venetianische Geschichte wundervollen Inhalts, and C. A. G. Seidel's Die Geisterseherinn, all of which were written in the mid-1790s. Unlike Schiller, who emphasized the psychological elements of the supernatural delusions, Tschink was interested in the machinery of the delusions, providing exhaustive detail of his explanations. Tschink's description of a magic lantern-induced spectral image predates the famous illusion Pepper's Ghost by more than fifty years.

== Influence and reception ==
Through The Victim of Magical Delusion, Tschink (as well as Schiller, Kahlert, and Grosse through their novels) was influential to William Godwin, who read Will's English translation, and wrote Lives of the Necromancers. Charles Brockden Brown was introduced to Gothic fiction through Tschink's work, and was influenced by him when writing Wieland: or, The Transformation: An American Tale, the first American gothic novel. The preferred intellectual ambience of early American literature favoured Tschink and Schiller over English Gothic writers Horace Walpole and Matthew Lewis due to the rational explanations behind supposedly supernatural phenomena.

The prominence of "explained supernatural" stories in German gothic stories lasted from 1780 to 1799 was strongly influenced by two Tschink works: Geschichte eines Geistersehers and another novel entitled Wundergeschichten sammt dem Schlüssel zu ihrer Erklärung. Due to the translation into English by Peter Will, Tschink also influenced the English Gothic literary scene.

The Victim of Magical Delusion was outsold by the similar works from Kahlert and Grosse in England. Contemporary reviews were mixed: the August 1795 edition of The Monthly Review called it "one of those numberless imitations to which the Ghost-Seer of the celebrated Schiller has given rise in Germany," while The Critical Review was positive, noting how Tschink showed "how easily a mind addicted to superstition may be deceived by the most common appearances at certain times and under certain impressions."

== Works ==
- Geschichte eines Geistersehers. Aus den Papieren des Mannes mit der eisernen Larve (Vienna: Franz Jakob Kaiserer, 1790–1793)
- Unparteiische Prüfung des zu Rom erschienenen kargen Inbegriffs von dem Leben und Thaten des Joseph Balsamo oder sogenannten Cagliostra [Disamina imparziale del compendio della vita e delle gesta di Giuseppe Balsamo denominato il conte Gagliostro] (Vienna: Franz Jakob Kaiserer, 1791)
- Wundergeschichten sammt dem Schlüssel zu ihrer Erklärung (Vienna: Franz Jakob Kaiserer, 1792)
- Grundriß der Logik (Olomouc: Skarniczl, 1802)
- Elementa Logicae (Olomouc: Skarniczl, 1806)

== See also ==
- 18th-century Gothic novel
