= Karl Friedrich Kahlert =

German gothic writer (1765–1813)

Karl Friedrich Kahlert (25 September 1765 – 8 September 1813) also known by the pen names Lawrence Flammenberg or Lorenz Flammenberg and Bernhard Stein was a German author of gothic fiction. He is best known for The Necromancer; or, The Tale of the Black Forest, an English translation by Peter Teuthold of his Der Geisterbanner: Eine Wundergeschichte aus mündlichen und schriftlichen Traditionen, which is one of the seven 'horrid novels' referenced by Jane Austen in Northanger Abbey. Through this work, he was a major influence on gothic literature in England, including Matthew Lewis's The Monk.

== Biography ==
Kahlert was born on 25 September 1765 in Breslau, Prussia (modern day Wrocław, Poland) and died on 8 September 1813 in Glogau, Prussia (modern day Głogów, Poland).

== Influence ==
Kahlert authored various stories and plays in German, none of which appear to have been translated into English with the exception of Der Geisterbanner, published in 1794. The translator, Peter Teuthold, provided a loose and unfaithful translation that also included Friedrich Schiller's Der Verbrecher aus verlorner Ehre, with Kahlert's text edited to incorporate Schiller's. The inclusion of Schiller's work allowed English writers to gain access to it thirty years earlier than any official translation, allowing it to enter public consciousness and influence English gothic literature. German gothic tales were the major contributor to the genre in England in the 1790s, with Kahlert's standing among them, alongside Cajetan Tschink, Carl Grosse, and Veit Weber. Kahlert was one of the major influences of The Monk by Matthew Lewis.

Kahlert was aware of the changes made to his text, and in the second edition (1799), re-translated the English to German and invited readers to compare the two to see the difference between English and German literary tastes, which he believed accounted for the translation's differences.

The Necromancer was a bestseller, and famous enough that it was included in the list of 'horrid novels' in Northanger Abbey alongside The Castle of Wolfenbach by Eliza Parsons, Clermont by Regina Maria Roche, The Mysterious Warning, a German Tale, by Eliza Parsons, The Midnight Bell by Francis Lathom, The Orphan of the Rhine by Eleanor Sleath, and Horrid Mysteries by Carl Grosse.

Following the publication of Northanger Abbey, The Necromancer became increasingly obscure. By the 1910s, it was assumed that all seven Northanger books were fictitious inventions of Austen, and by 1922, after the discovery of Horrid Mysteries, that all seven would not still be extant. Critic and writer George Saintsbury was a prominent disbeliever in the authenticity of the septet, stating: "I should indeed like some better authority than Miss Isabella Thorpe's to assure me of their existence." All seven books were eventually rediscovered by Michael Sadleir in the 1920s by acquiring copies from Sotheby's auctions and discussions with collectors. The rediscovered copy of The Necromancer came from the estate of Arthur Hutchinson, a magazine editor and book collector, who bequeathed his library to Sadleir upon his death.

A 2007 reprint by Valancourt Books was the first to provide details of Kahlert's life to an English audience.

== Works ==
As Lorenz Flammenberg:

- Der Geisterbanner: Eine Wundergeschichte aus mündlichen und schriftlichen Traditionen (Breslau: Wilhelm Gottlieb Korn, 1792)
- Maria von Schwaningen: Ein Trauerspiel in fünf Aufzügen (Breslau: Wilhelm Gottlieb Korn, 1797)

As Bernhard Stein:

- Die Waffenbrüder: Ein tragisches Sittengemälde aus den Zeiten der Kreutzzüge in fünf Aufzügen (Breslau: Wilhelm Gottlieb Korn, 1792)

== See also ==
- List of gothic novels
- The Necromancers: The Best of Black Magic and Witchcraft
