= Fal-i Qur'an =

A fal-i Qur'an is a divinatory Qur'an used to predict and interpret the future for the user. The word fal-i comes from Persian and means divination. Islamic divinatory and occult practices grew in popularity during the Safavid Empire's rule, and manifested through practices such as astrology, geomancy, and the use of fal-i Qur'ans. The use of the fal-i Qur'an draws on previous practices across religions of using holy books for bibliomancy. Engaging in these divinatory tools allowed users to interpret events in their lives and offer advice. Fal-i qur'ans are often associated with falnama, decorated fortune telling books. A fal-i Qur'an is made up of a standard Qur'an with a divination chart, also referred to as a divination grid, at the end. The divination charts found in fal-i Qur'ans consist of a letter table and corresponding explanations which users can understand by following specific steps, to answer and offer advice to posed questions. The majority of fal-i Qur'ans still extant today are from the Safavid period, therefore created in the Safavid Quranic style. Safavid Qur'ans covered a range of styles from simple handwritten copies to very ornate and decorated versions with various colors.

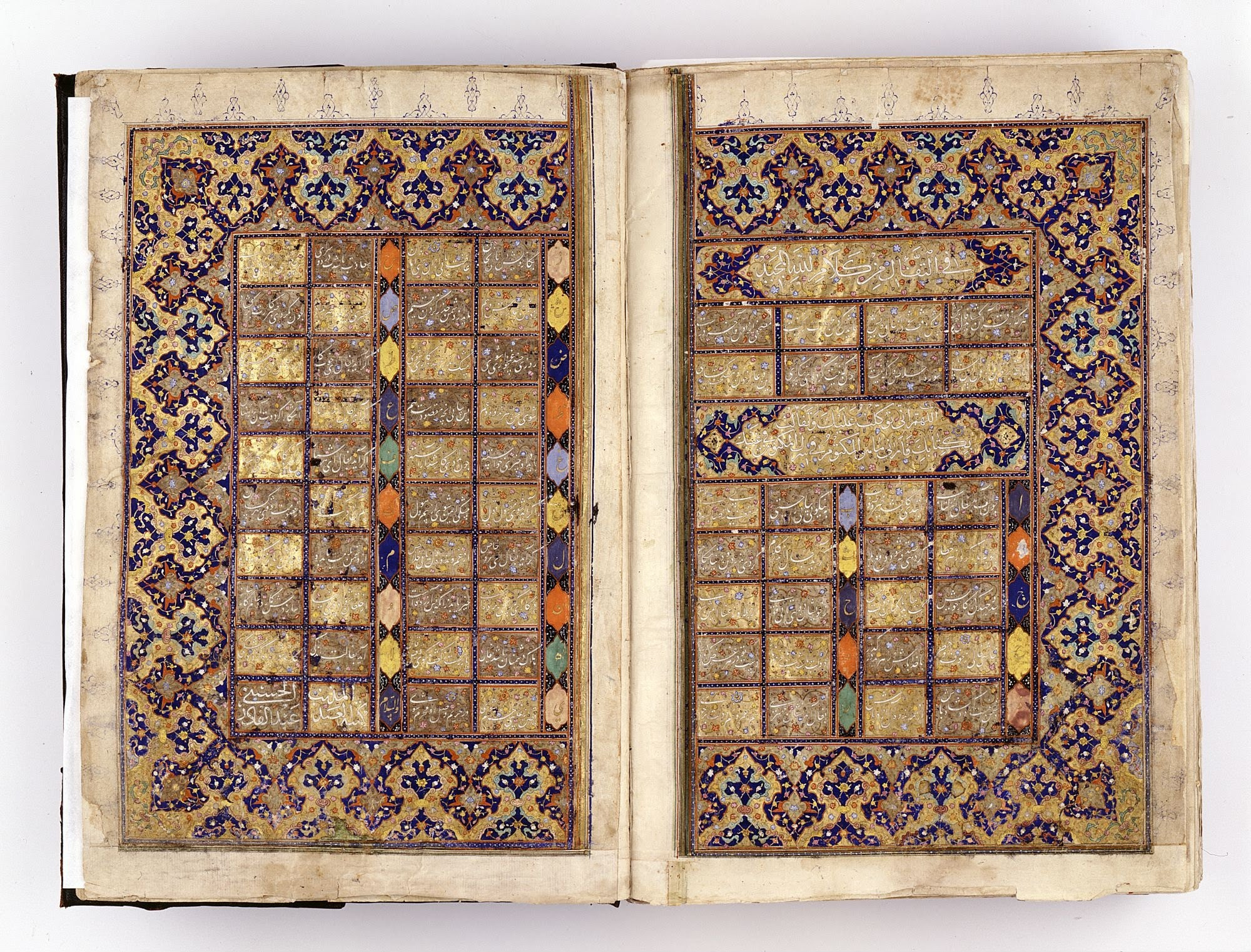
Divination table (falnama) from the Qur'an copied by Abd al-Qadir al-Husaini

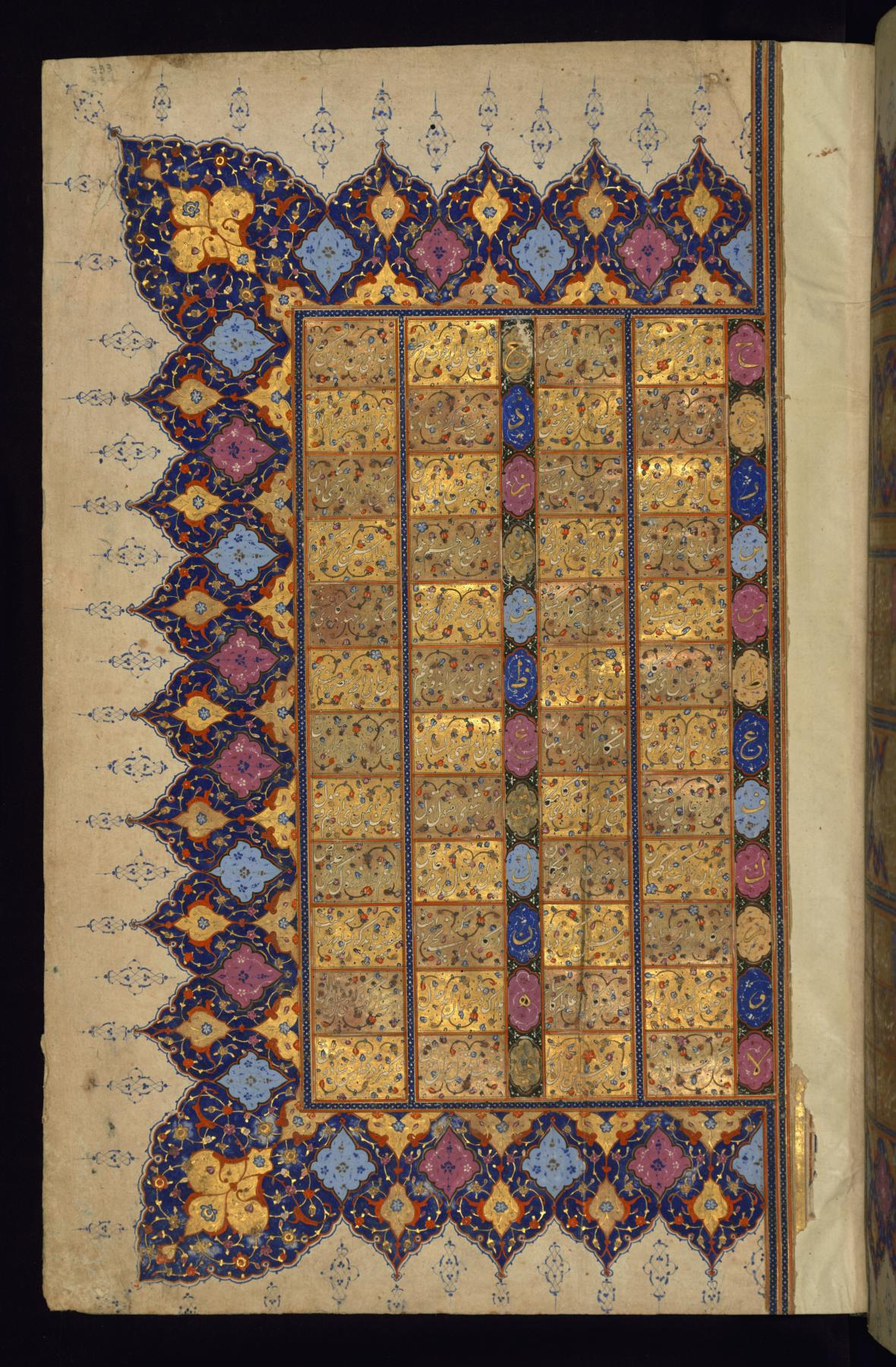
Left Side of a Double-page Table of Divination. 17th century (Safavid). H: 15 3/16 x W: 10 1/16 in. (38.5 x 25.5 cm)

== Divinatory Function ==
Fal-i Qur'ans function within a larger Islamic practice of bibliomancy, with methods derived from earlier bibliomaniac practices in Judaism, Christianity, and Central Asian Buddhism. Multiple texts, including the Qur'an, have been used in Persian Islamic practices. Other texts include the Divan, or the "Compendium of Poems" written by Persian poet Hāfiz. This text and excerpts from it are still used today for bibliomancy. In Persian fal-i Qur'an practices, manuscripts detailing how to use and interpret Qur'anic divination were often referred to as falnama, and could be included in the back of the Qur'an or as free standing text. These falnama texts formed the basis of Ottoman fal-i Qur'an practices beginning in the 15th century when a Shi'i falnama was translated into Ottoman Turkish. Persian or Shi'i fal-i Qur'an divination were derived from the interpretive power of Qur'anic verses. In order to answer a divinatory question using a fal-i Qur'an, the practitioner was instructed to recite certain verses from the Qur'an, such as the "Throne Verse from the al-Baqarah surah. The practitioner would then navigate to a random page in a complete Qur'an codex, and find the first letter of the seventh line on the page on the right of the randomized opening. The divination tables included in the back of the divinatory Qur'an would then be used to interpret the selected letter, with each letter of the Arabic alphabet and its corresponding positive and negative omens included in the table.

== Materials ==
A Safavid Qur'an is made up of many materials that take the skills of multiple artists. Every aspect of the Qur'an, from the binding, the decorations, and the calligraphy of the text required the mastery of a different set of materials. The calligraphy was inscribed in multiple styles depending on the text. Thuluth, a style of Arabic calligraphy, was used to label sura titles and number verses. It was often written in blue or white ink. The names of Allah were written in muhaqqaq, another style of Arabic calligraphy, in blue or gold ink. Blue and gold are the primary colors used in Safavid Qur'ans, with red black and white making up the secondary color scheme, enriching the color palette. Gold pigment and blue ink made from lapis lazuli were used in smaller quantities in the final layer. Other colored ink was pigmented by dye from plants and insects. Safavid Qur'ans were often bound in lavishly decorated gilded leather, protecting the more fragile parchment. The leather was covered in decorative motifs that stood in relief to the red-brown leather. Some sections were left ungilded to highlight the contrast in color and textures of the shiny gold and matte leather. The leather covers were practical for protecting the Qur'an while serving a decorative purpose. The text of the Qur'an was written on parchment or paper made of linen and hemp rags. In both cases, the result was a smooth thick surface that absorbed ink easily. In some cases, divination tables were added into the ends of Qur'ans after they were bound. This meant that the texture of the paper and hues of the ink may not match the original Qur'an exactly, though the materials used are the same.

== Examples of Fal-i Qur'ans ==
- The Central Library of Tehran University contains manuscripts with verses and prose in the back.
- The Austrian National Library in Vienna, Austria, has a Qur'an with a book of divination at the end, dating from AH 952/1545 AD Safavid Iran.
- The Lilly Library at Indiana University in Bloomington, Indiana, United States has a miniature Qur'an with a folio of a falnama in the back with instructions for divination and inception of a divination grid from 1551 Safavid Iran.
- The Chester Beatty Library, Dublin, Ireland, has a single sheet from a Qur'an containing a falnama with instructions for divination and a divination grid from 1560-70s Safavid Iran.
- The Library of Congress in Washington, D.C., has a fal-i Qur'an containing a divination grid from Safavid Persia, but containing evidence of Ottoman interaction from 1550 to 1600.
- The Keir Collection in London, England, has a Qur'an with divinatory text made in 16th-century Safavid Iran.
- The Bibliothèque Nationale de France in Paris has a Qur'an with a divination treatise entitled 'On Divination by the Glorious Word of God' from 1594 Safavid Iran.
- The Mevlāna Museum in Konya, Turkey, has a Qur'an with divinatory text from 16th-century Safavid Iran.
- The Walters Art Museum in Baltimore, Maryland, has a Qur'an with divination tables at the end, from 17th century Safavid Iran.
- The Metropolitan Museum of Art in New York City, New York has a pocket Qur'an with a divination at the back from 1785 CE Iran.
