= The Monk =

1796 gothic novel by Matthew Lewis

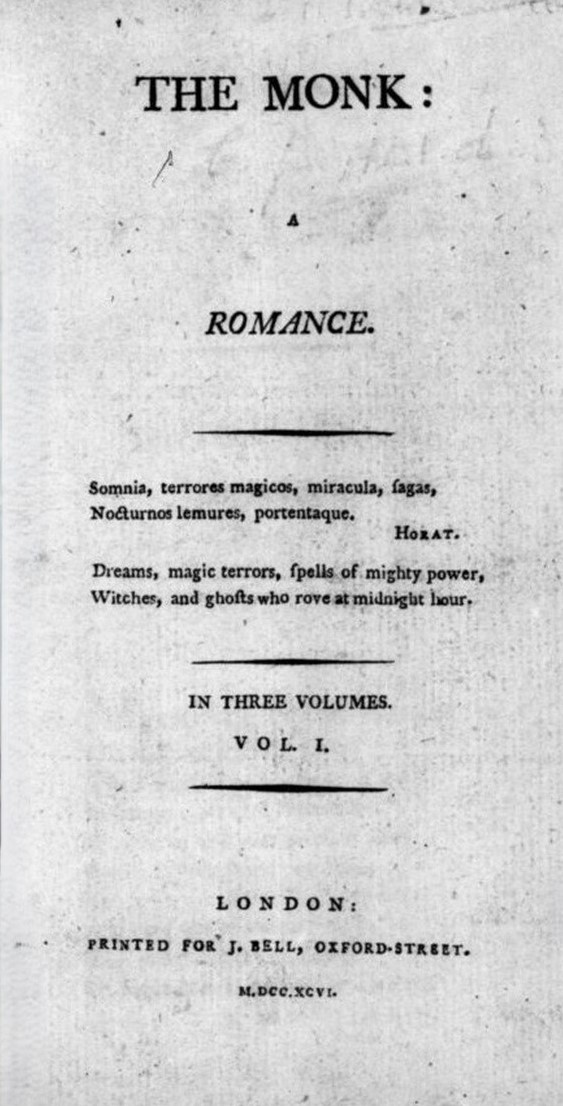
- Title page of first edition
- Author: Matthew Gregory Lewis
- Language: English
- Genre: Gothic novel
- Set in: Madrid, Strasbourg and Germany, 16th–18th centuries
- Publisher: Joseph Bell
- Publication date: 12 March 1796
- Publication place: England
- Media type: Print: hardback
- Dewey Decimal: 823.08731
- LC Class: PR4887 .M7
- Text: The Monk at Wikisource

The Monk: A Romance is a Gothic novel by Matthew Gregory Lewis, published in 1796 across three volumes. Written early in Lewis's career, it was published anonymously when he was 20. It tells the story of a virtuous Catholic monk who gives in to his violent and lustful urges, setting off a chain of events that leave him damned. It is a prime example of the type of Gothic that specializes in horror.

Upon publication, the novel proved scandalous. Readers were shocked by its sexually explicit content, and themes of rape and incest, leading it to become arguably the most controversial Gothic novel of the 18th century. Amidst a public outcry, the novel became hugely popular. Over time, Lewis came to feel that its writing had been in poor taste. Later editions were heavily censored by the author himself.

The Monk is considered part of the gothic literary canon, a forerunner to the popular Gothic novels of the 19th century, and an influence on the modern horror genre. It has been adapted or significantly inspired a number of plays, films, and writings.

== Plot ==
The story revolves around the titular monk, Ambrosio, who succumbs to sexual temptation and becomes morally corrupted. A subplot follows Agnes, a nun at the nearby convent, who also violates her vow of chastity. The two storylines are connected by the character of Antonia, who admires Ambrosio and becomes romantically involved with Agnes's brother Lorenzo.

=== Ambrosio, the monk ===
Ambrosio was left at an abbey in Madrid as an infant and is now a famously celebrated monk. A beautiful and virtuous young woman, Antonia, goes to hear one of his sermons, and meets Lorenzo, who falls in love with her.

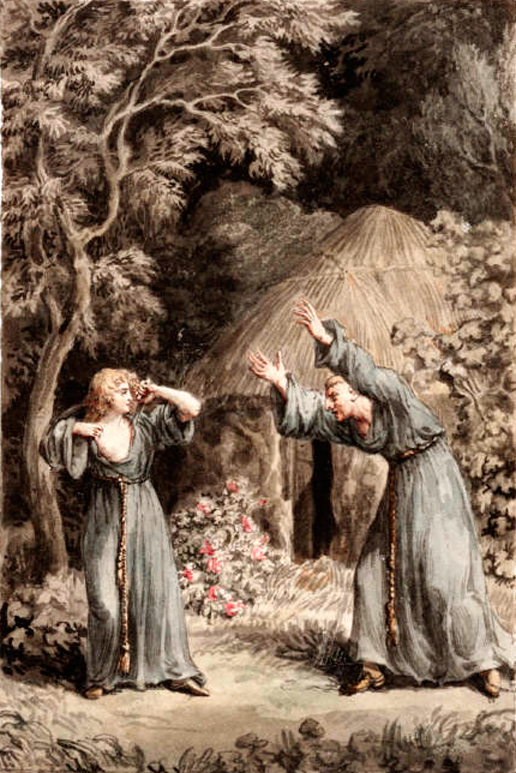
Ambrosio sees Matilda's exposed breast in the monastery garden (Charles Reuben Ryley, watercolour)

Ambrosio's closest friend among the monks, Rosario, reveals that he is a woman named Matilda, who disguised herself to be near Ambrosio. While picking a rose for her, Ambrosio is bitten by a serpent and falls deathly ill. Matilda nurses him. When he recovers, Matilda reveals that she sucked the poison from Ambrosio's wound and is now dying herself. At the point of her death, Matilda begs him to make love to her, and he agrees reluctantly. After having sex with Ambrosio, Matilda performs a ritual in the cemetery which cures her of the poison. She and Ambrosio continue to be secret lovers, but Ambrosio grows tired of her.

Ambrosio meets Antonia and is immediately attracted to her. He begins visiting Antonia's mother regularly, hoping to seduce Antonia. In the meantime, Lorenzo has secured his family's blessing for his marriage with Antonia. Matilda tells Ambrosio she can help him gain Antonia's charms, the same way she was healed of the poison: witchcraft. Ambrosio is initially horrified, but agrees. Matilda and Ambrosio return to the cemetery, where Matilda calls upon Lucifer, who appears young and handsome. He gives Matilda a magic myrtle bough, which will allow Ambrosio to open any door, as well as rape Antonia without her knowing. Ambrosio uses the magic bough to enter Antonia's bedroom. He is on the point of raping her when Antonia's mother arrives and confronts him. In panic, Ambrosio murders her and returns to the abbey, unsatisfied in his lust and horrified that he has now become a murderer.

Antonia, grief-stricken, sees her mother's ghost. She faints and Ambrosio is called to help. Matilda helps Ambrosio acquire a concoction that will put Antonia in a deathlike coma. While attending to Antonia, Ambrosio administers the poison, and Antonia appears to die. He takes Antonia to the crypt beneath the convent, where she awakens from her drugged sleep and Ambrosio rapes her. Afterward, he is as disgusted with Antonia as he was with Matilda, who arrives to warn him that the convent is burning down due to a riot (caused by the events of Raymond and Agnes's story). Antonia attempts to escape, and Ambrosio kills her.

Ambrosio and Matilda are brought before the Inquisition. Matilda confesses her guilt and is sentenced to death. Before she is executed, she sells her soul to the devil in exchange for her freedom and her life. Ambrosio insists upon his innocence and is tortured. He is visited by Matilda, who tells him to yield his soul to Satan. Ambrosio again proclaims his innocence, but when faced with torture, he admits to his sins of rape, murder, and sorcery and is condemned to burn. In despair, Ambrosio asks Lucifer to save his life, who tells him it will be at the cost of his soul. Ambrosio is reluctant to give up the hope of God's forgiveness, but Lucifer tells him that there is none. After much resistance, Ambrosio signs the contract. Lucifer transports him from his cell to the wilderness. Lucifer informs him that Antonia's mother, whom he murdered, was also his mother, making Antonia his sister, adding to his crimes the sin of incest. Ambrosio then learns that he accepted Lucifer's deal only moments before he was to be pardoned. Lucifer reveals that it has long been his plan to gain Ambrosio's soul, as he could see that Ambrosio was "virtuous from vanity, not principle." He also reveals that Matilda was a demon helping him. Finally, Lucifer points out the loophole in their deal: Ambrosio only asked to get out of his cell, and Lucifer did not agree not to harm him afterwards. Lucifer carries him into the sky and drops Ambrosio to his death, triumphant that Ambrosio's soul will now be damned for eternity.

=== Raymond and Agnes ===
Lorenzo's sister, Agnes, is a nun at the nearby abbey who is romantically involved with Raymond, son of a Marquis. Ambrosio hears the confession of the nuns at Agnes's convent. When Agnes confesses that she is pregnant with Raymond's child, Ambrosio turns her over to the Prioress of her abbey for punishment.

Lorenzo confronts Raymond about his relationship with his sister Agnes. Raymond tells their long history. Raymond was travelling in Germany when he was nearly killed by bandits. He avoided being killed, and rescued a Baroness who was also travelling. Visiting the Baroness afterward, Raymond fell in love with her niece Agnes. However, the Baroness was in love with Raymond; when he refused her advances, she made arrangements to send Agnes to a convent. Raymond and Agnes made plans to elope before Agnes left her aunt's castle for the convent. Agnes planned to dress as the Bleeding Nun, a ghost who haunted the castle and exited its gates at midnight. Raymond accidentally eloped with the real ghost of the real Bleeding Nun. Exorcising the ghost of the Bleeding Nun required assistance from the Wandering Jew. When Raymond was free, he found Agnes in the convent. There he seduced Agnes. When she discovered that she was pregnant, she begged him to help her escape.

When Raymond finishes his story, Lorenzo agrees to help him elope with Agnes. He acquires a papal bull releasing Agnes from her vows as a nun so that she may marry Raymond. However, when he shows it to the Prioress, she tells Lorenzo that Agnes died several days before. Lorenzo does not believe it, but after two months, there is no other word concerning Agnes. Eventually, to try to find Agnes, Raymond's servant disguises himself as a beggar and goes to the convent, where Mother St. Ursula sneaks him a note that tells Raymond to have the cardinal arrest the Prioress for Agnes's murder.

During a procession honouring Saint Clare, the Prioress is arrested. Mother St. Ursula publicly describes Agnes's death at the hand of the sisters. When the procession crowd hears that the Prioress is a murderer, they turn into a rioting mob. They kill the Prioress, attack other nuns, and set the convent on fire. In the confusion, Lorenzo finds a group of nuns and a young woman named Virginia hiding in the crypt. Lorenzo discovers a passage leading down into a dungeon, where he finds Agnes, alive and holding the dead body of the baby she had given birth to while abandoned in the dungeon. With Virginia's help, Lorenzo rescues Agnes and the other nuns from the crypt.

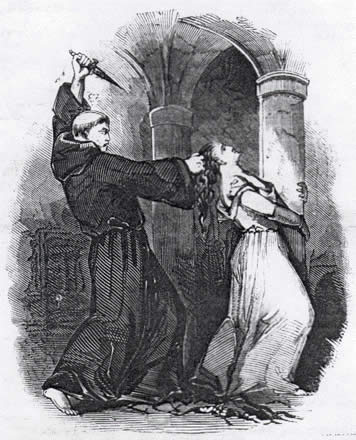
Ambrosio murders Antonia

Virginia visits Lorenzo as he is recovering from his grief and the two become closer. Agnes tells the story of her miserable experience in the dungeon. Agnes and Raymond are married, and the couple leaves Madrid for Raymond's castle, accompanied by Lorenzo and Virginia, who are also eventually married.

== Characters ==
- Agnes de Medina is Don Lorenzo's younger sister and Don Raymond's lover. Her mother fell ill while pregnant with Agnes and vowed to send Agnes to the convent if she delivered her safely. She is a virtuous young lady who intends to marry Don Raymond but her parents want her to become a nun, so she decides to run away with him. Their plans are foiled and, thinking Don Raymond has abandoned her forever, she enters the convent.
- Ambrosio is an extremely devout Capuchin monk about 30 years old. He was found left at the Abbey doorstep when he was too young to tell his tale. The monks consider him a present from the Virgin Mary and they educate him at the monastery.
- Antonia Dalfa is a timid and innocent girl of 15. She was brought up in an old castle in Murcia with only her mother Elvira and is therefore very sheltered. She is the object of Don Lorenzo's attentions. The novel's evil characters are considered to be better written than the virtuous ones, and Antonia's character is so virtuous that some have found her "deadly dull".
- Elvira Dalfa is the mother of Antonia and Ambrosio. She married a young nobleman in secret. His family does not approve of her and because of this she and her husband escape to the Indies, leaving her 2-year-old son behind. After 13 years, when Antonia is very young, her husband dies and she returns to Murcia where she lives on an allowance given to her by her father-in-law.
- Leonella Dalfa is Elvira's sister and Antonia's spinster aunt. She takes an immediate dislike to Ambrosio after hearing his sermon. She believes Don Christoval's polite attentions are more significant than they actually are and is hurt when he fails to call at her house. She eventually marries a younger man and lives in Cordova.
- Don Lorenzo de Medina Celi is Agnes's older brother and friend of Don Raymond and Don Christoval. Immediately intrigued by Antonia after meeting her at Ambrosio's sermon, Don Lorenzo resolves to marry her.
- Matilda is first known as Rosario, the young boy who looks up to Ambrosio "with a respect approaching idolatry". Rosario is brought to the Monastery by a well dressed rich stranger but not much more is known of his past. He always hides under his cowl and later reveals that he is actually Matilda, a beautiful young lady who loves Ambrosio. Matilda 'loved' Ambrosio even before she joined the monastery (as a boy), and therefore requested a painting of herself as Madonna to be given to Ambrosio, which hangs in his room. She seduces Ambrosio and aids in his destruction of Antonia with magic. The character of Matilda was highly praised by Coleridge as Lewis's masterpiece, and is said to be "exquisitely imagined" and "superior in wickedness to the most wicked of men." Though she is considered by some critics to be the most intelligent, articulate, and interesting, she is difficult to characterise. The plot of the novel relies on her being a supernatural force with magical powers, but she begins as a human. She tells Ambrosio she loves him when she thinks he is asleep and cries "involuntary" tears when she realises he no longer cares for her. These passages, together with the haste in which the novel was written, seem to indicate "that Lewis changed his mind in the course of the narrative".
- The Prioress, also known as Mother St. Agatha, punishes Agnes severely to uphold the honour of the convent of St. Clare. "Viciously cruel in the name of virtue", she keeps Agnes prisoner in the dungeons beneath the convent with only enough bread and water to sustain her but not nourish her. The prioress circulates the story of Agnes's death to everyone, including Agnes's own relations. She is beaten to a bloody pulp by the crowd that gathers to honour St. Clare when they realise she is responsible for Agnes's supposed death. She is also the inspiration for the Abbess of San Stephano in Radcliffe's The Italian.
- Don Raymond, Marquis de las Cisternas is the son of a Marquis and is also known as Alphonso d'Alvarada. He takes the name Alphonso when his father, by the urging of his friend the Duke of Villa Hermosa, advises him that taking a new name will allow him to be known for his merits rather than his rank. He travels to Paris, but finds the Parisians "frivolous, unfeeling and insincere" and sets out for Germany. Near Strasbourg he is forced to seek accommodations in a cottage after his chaise supposedly breaks down. He is the target of the robber Baptiste but with help from Baptiste's wife Marguerite, Raymond is able to save himself and the Baroness Lindenberg. Grateful, the Baroness invites Don Raymond to stay with her and her husband at their castle in Bavaria.
- Donna Rodolpha, Baroness of Lindenburg meets Don Raymond while travelling to Strasbourg. She is in love with Don Raymond and becomes jealous when she finds out Don Raymond is in love with her niece, Agnes. She asks him to leave the Castle of Lindenberg and later speaks poorly of his character.
- Mother St. Ursula assists in Agnes's rescue. She is a witness to the Prioress's crimes and without her, Don Lorenzo would not be able to accuse the Prioress.
- Theodore is Don Raymond's page. He enjoys writing poetry and authors the poems "Love and Age" and "The Water King". After reading "Love and Age", Don Raymond points out the flaws in the piece, which may be flaws Lewis noticed in his own work. Far from being the unwaiveringly faithful servant stock character, Theodore plays a key role in moving the plot forward by helping with Don Raymond's plans to escape with Agnes. Theodore's character also provides foreshadowing through his poems. His poems parallel the action of the story. For instance, in his poem "The Water King", the lovely maid's fate foreshadows Antonia's. In addition, Theodore also bears a striking resemblance to other characters in other of Lewis's works, including Leolyn in One O'clock (1811) and Eugene in "Mistrust" from Romantic Tales (1808).
- Virginia de Villa-Franca, introduced late in the story, is a beautiful, virtuous young relation of the Prioress who represents St. Clare in the Procession. Virginia nurses the ill Agnes back to health and thus wins Lorenzo's affections. Like Isabella in The Castle of Otranto, she is introduced as an acceptable marriage partner for Lorenzo, but plays an unessential part in the plot.

== Publication history ==
=== Composition ===
Lewis said he got his first inspiration for the novel from a short story by Richard Steele called "The History of Santon Barsisa," which was published in The Guardian in 1713. Lewis summarized the story as the tale of "a holy man led by the devil into seduction and murder and tricked at the point of death into forfeiting his soul." In one letter, Lewis claimed to have written The Monk in ten weeks, but other correspondence suggests that he had at least started it, or something similar, a couple of years earlier.

=== First edition ===
The first edition of The Monk was published some time between 1795 and 1796. Older scholarship tended toward a 1795 publication year, but because no copies of the book so dated could be found, and because contemporary sources did not begin announcing or referencing the work until March 1796, the latter date began to be preferred. It was published anonymously, but for Lewis's initials after the preface and was highly praised by reviewers in The Monthly Mirror of June 1796 as well as the Analytical Review.

=== Second edition ===
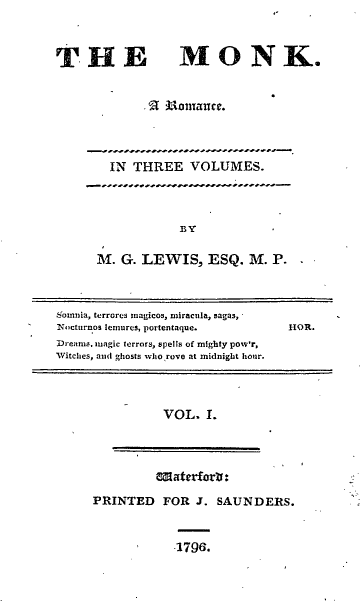
1796 edition, printed in Ireland

The first edition sold well, and a second edition was published in October 1796. The good sales and reviews of the first had emboldened Lewis, and he signed the new edition with his full name, adding "M.P." to reflect his newly acquired seat in the House of Commons. The book continued to rise in popularity, but in a February 1797 review by a writer for the European Magazine, the novel was criticised for "plagiarism, immorality, and wild extravagance."

=== Fourth edition ===
Lewis wrote to his father on 23 February 1798, attempting to make reparations: the controversy caused by The Monk was a source of distress to his family. As recorded by Irwin: “twenty is not the age at which prudence is most to be expected. Inexperience prevented my distinguishing what should give offence; but as soon as I found that offence was given, I made the only reparation in my power: I carefully revised the work, and expunged every syllable on which could be grounded the slightest construction of immorality. This, indeed, was no difficult task, for the objection rested entirely on expressions too strong, and words carelessly chosen; not on the sentiments, characters, or general tendency of the work".

The fourth edition of the novel was published in 1798, and, according to Peck, "contains nothing which could endanger the most fragile virtue... He expunged every remotely offensive word in his three volumes, with meticulous attention to lust. Ambrosio, formerly a ravisher, becomes an intruder or betrayer; his incontinence changes to weakness or infamy, his lust to desire, his desires to emotions. Having indulged in excesses for three editions, he committed an error in the fourth". Lewis wrote an apology for The Monk in the preface of another work, as recorded by Peck:

"Without entering into the discussion whether the principles inculcated in "The Monk" are right or wrong, or whether the means by which the story is conducted is likely to do more mischief than the tendency is likely to produce good, I solemnly declare, that when I published the work I had no idea that its publication could be prejudicial; if I was wrong, the error proceeded from my judgment, not from my intention. Without entering into the merits of the advice which it proposes to convey, or attempting to defend (what I now condemn myself) the language and manner in which that advice was delivered, I solemnly declare, that in writing the passage which regards the Bible (consisting of a single page, and the only passage which I ever wrote on the subject) I had not the most distant intention to bring the sacred Writings into contempt, and that, had I suspected it of producing such an effect, I should not have written the paragraph".

== Reviews ==
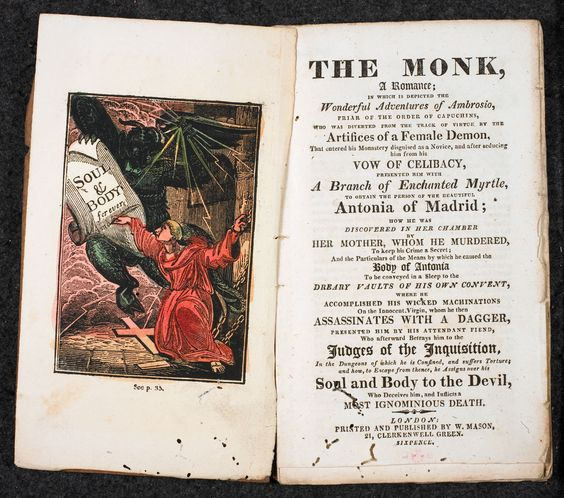
Frontispiece to an 1818 pirated and abridged edition, emphasising the scandalous content

Samuel Taylor Coleridge wrote a piece in The Critical Review, in which he both praises and criticizes the novel. He acknowledges that it is "the offspring of no common genius," and that the "underplot... is skillfully and closely connected with the main story, and is subservient to its development." However he notes that, ”we declare it to be our opinion, that the Monk is a romance, which if a parent saw in the hands of a son or daughter, he might reasonably turn pale".

Thomas James Mathias followed Coleridge's lead in The Pursuits of Literature, a poem in the 18th-Century satiric tradition, but takes a step farther than Coleridge by claiming that a specific passage made the novel indictable under law. The passage, found in Chapter Seven Volume II, discusses an interpretation of the Bible as too lewd for youth to read.

These two major pieces led the way for a multitude of other attacks on the novel, from such sources as the Monthly Review, the Monthly Magazine, and the Scots Magazine; the last of these attacked the novel six years after its publication. It was a general trend amongst those who criticised, however, to offer praise of some aspect of the novel. "It looked," writes André Parreaux, "as if every reviewer or critic of the book, no matter how hostile he was, felt compelled to at least pay lip-service to Lewis's genius."

The criticism of his novel, extending even into criticism of his person, never truly left Lewis, and an attack on his character was published by the Courier posthumously, calling itself a "just estimate of his character." As recorded by MacDonald: "He had devoted the first fruits of his mind to the propagation of evil, and the whole long harvest was burnt up ... There is a moral in the life of this man ... He was a reckless defiler of the public mind; a profligate, he cared not how many were to be undone when he drew back the curtain of his profligacy; he had infected his reason with the insolent belief that the power to corrupt made the right, and that conscience might be laughed, so long as he could evade law. The Monk was an eloquent evil; but the man who compounded it knew in his soul that he was compounding poison for the multitude, and in that knowledge he sent it into the world".

There were those who defended The Monk as well. Joseph Bell, publisher of the novel, spent half of his essay Impartial Strictures on the Poem Called "The Pursuits of Literature" and Particularly a Vindication of the Romance of "The Monk" defending Lewis; Thomas Dutton, in his Literary Census: A Satirical Poem, retaliated against Mathias and praised Lewis; Henry Francis Robert Soame compared Lewis to Dante in his The Epistle in Rhyme to M. G. Lewis, Esq. M. P.

"Assurances that The Monk was not as dangerous as its enemies maintained failed to dampen its success with the reading public", writes Peck. "They had been told that the book was horrible, blasphemous, and lewd, and they rushed to put their morality to the test". Indeed, the novel's popularity continued to rise and by 1800 there were five London and two Dublin editions.

== Manuscripts ==
An original manuscript is in the collections of Wisbech & Fenland Museum, Isle of Ely.

The W&F Museum was awarded a grant of £7,222 in 2022 for the conservation and digitisation of the manuscript of The Monk by M.G. Lewis which is part of the Townshend Collection.

== Major themes ==
=== Struggle with temptation ===
Ambrosio displays traces of hubris and lust very early in the novel. It is explained that "he [Ambrosio] dismissed them [the monks] with an air of conscious superiority, in which humility's semblance combated with the reality of pride. Similarly, "he fixed his eyes on the Virgin… Gracious God, should I then resist the temptation? Should I not barter for a single embrace the reward of my sufferings for thirty years?" Both passages explicitly show the conflicting forces, that is, the moral choices that rage within Ambrosio. His nature instructs him to exult himself above others and lust for the Virgin Mary, while his religious inclinations, or at least his awareness of his position within the church, command him to humility and chastity. Ambrosio begins to deviate from his holy conduct when he encounters Matilda, a character revealed at the end of the novel to be an emissary of Satan. Ambrosio's story focuses on temptation which is made to be extreme by the oppression of his upbringing. All of these circumstances are consistent with the classic model of the morality tale, and, true to form, once Ambrosio is tempted into sin he enters into a tailspin of increasing desire, which leads him to transgression and culminates in the loss of his eternal salvation and his grisly murder at the hands of the devil.

This pattern of wicked actions leading to ill consequences is exactly what is expected in a morality tale and is reflected in other Gothic novels. For example, Lewis's work is often discussed in conjunction with that of Ann Radcliffe's. Robert Miles writes that "Ann Radcliffe and Matthew Lewis were the two most significant Gothic novelists of the 1790s, an estimate of their importance shared by their contemporaries.". Indeed, the repercussions of malevolent and self-serving actions are represented extraordinarily well in Radcliffe's The Romance of the Forest. The Marquis in the story was driven to murder for "the title of his brother… and riches which would enable him to indulge his voluptuous inclinations." Similar to Ambrosio, the Marquis was tempted and succumbed to sin, which sets him on a wicked path leading to his public shame and suicide.

=== The triumph of evil ===
Matilda is the catalyst of evil in The Monk, as Ambrosio battles the temptations she exposes him to. The first triumph of evil seen in the novel occurs after Matilda has saved Ambrosio's life by sucking out poison from a snake bite. When Ambrosio finds out about her allegedly altruistic sacrifice, she is able to exploit his gratitude. In order to save Matilda, Ambrosio must break the vows he has held for the entirety of his life and expose himself to evil. Throughout the story Matilda wields pity, lust, and innocence as a weapon, breaking down the beliefs Ambrosio used to define himself by. The rest of the story is the result of Matilda's influence over Ambrosio as she leads him through progressively unforgivable sins— rape, murder, and witchcraft—until he eventually signs his own soul over to the devil. The story's many horrific acts and their consequences for other characters are also victories of evil, but the pinnacle of evil is Ambrosio's total relinquishment of his beliefs when he offers his soul to the devil.

=== Harm to innocents ===
Lewis also deviates from what is typically expected from morality tales when he includes the sacrifice of innocent people in the latter chapters of the novel. As a result of Ambrosio's personal vices, both Elvira and Antonia are slain. Elvira finds Ambrosio, "the man whom Madrid esteems a saint…at this late hour near the couch of my unhappy child" on the verge of committing rape and Ambrosio murders her to prevent her from revealing his crimes. Elvira was guilty of no crime and throughout the novel was committed to the welfare of her family and her daughter in particular. Likewise, Antonia is murdered to prevent her from alerting Officers of the Inquisition of Ambrosio's crimes. Antonia is also undeserving of her fate, as she was always a loyal daughter and honest woman throughout the novel.

Another Gothic novel in which one individual's quest for a gratification of the senses leads to the ruin of others is Vathek by William Beckford. In the novel, the Caliph Vathek attempts to sacrifice fifty children to a demon to gain his favour. Without mercy he "pushed the poor innocent into the gulph [open to hell]." Similarly, in The Necromancer by Lawrence Flammenberg, an entire village is sacrificed to a troop of banditti who are angered at their hideout being revealed. The leader of group explaining that "the villagers are not yet punished… for having assisted them, but they shall not escape their doom." Admittedly, Vathek can be more readily identified as a morality tale, but The Necromancer warns against the pernicious effects of a legal system that is bereft of mercy. A criminal declares during his confession that his life "will afford a useful lesson to judges, and teach the guardians of the people to be careful how they inflict punishments if they will not make a complete rogue of many a hapless wretch…"

=== Anti-Catholic themes ===
The Monk is one of many Gothic novels that criticises the Catholic Church and Catholic tradition. Lewis's condemnation of the Church is apparent throughout the novel in his characterisation of Catholic religious authorities. Ambrosio and the Prioress represent all that is seen as wrong with the Catholic Church. The vow of celibacy, which many Protestant writers at the time condemned as unnatural, is presented as contributing significantly to Ambrosio's repressed sexuality, which in turn leads to the heinous acts he commits against Antonia. Agnes's breaking of her vow is seen by the Prioress as an unforgivable crime, which drives her to punish Agnes so severely. Blakemore argues that in England, the sexual demonization of the aberrant Catholic "Other" was part and parcel of the ideological formation of the English, Protestant national identity."

Lewis also appears to mock Catholic superstition through use of iconoclasm repeatedly over the course of the novel, such as when Lorenzo moves a statue of the virgin St. Clare to reveal the chamber in which Agnes is being kept prisoner. This demystification of idols makes light of Catholic superstition in relation to statues and sacred objects. Lewis's treatment of the Catholic Church clearly shows that he harbours negative sentiments about the Church's activities.

The lack of divinity shown throughout the novel is not unique to The Monk. John Moore's Zeluco focuses on the nefarious plots of a single man who cannot control his passions. Like Ambrosio, Zeluco's disposition is shown very early in the novel to be disagreeable. In his youth Zeluco "seized it [his pet sparrow] with his hand, and while it struggled to get free, with a curse he squeezed the little animal to death." Zeluco continually gratifies his vices much to his discredit and dishonor, and, as in The Monk, his sins compound upon themselves culminating in the infanticide of his only son. Unlike Ambrosio, however, Zeluco has no physical demons spurring him onwards, but rather his insatiable appetite for sin.

=== Sinful sexuality ===
The Bleeding Nun, who appears in the subplot of Raymond and Agnes, epitomises the sin of erotic desires. Raymond mistakes her for his lover, Agnes, because she is veiled and he cannot see her face. The veil that "conceals and inhibits sexuality comes by the same gesture to represent it." Both Antonia and Matilda are veiled to protect their virginity and innocence and it is expected that Agnes also covers her face for this reason when she meets Raymond. However, the removal of the veil reveals the Bleeding Nun, dead and punished because of her sins. While she was alive, she was a prostitute and a murderer before she was murdered by her lover. Her story is the first we receive of how giving in to sexual desires leads to death and eternal unrest. Raymond expects to find Agnes's beautiful, virgin face beneath the veil, but instead finds death. Her unveiling connects the loss of virginity and the giving in to sexual desires with death and punishment. Both the Bleeding Nun and Ambrosio begin pious, but then fall prey to their sexual desires. Ambrosio has already given into his desire for Matilda and the story of the Bleeding Nun told in the subplot foreshadows his further downfall with Antonia and his eternal punishment in the hands of the devil.

=== The reality of the supernatural ===
The Bleeding Nun also introduces the world of the supernatural into The Monk. The supernatural something "that is above nature or belonging to a higher realm or system than that of nature". This introduction brings another Gothic element into the book. Up until this point, the plot has relied on natural elements of the sublime to invoke the terror expected of a Gothic novel. The entrance of the Bleeding Nun transforms this natural world into a world where the supernatural is possible. When she gets into Raymond's carriage, "Immediately thick clouds obscured the sky: The winds howled around us, the lightning flashed, and the Thunder roared tremendously". Nature is acknowledging the presence of a supernatural force.

When Agnes tells Raymond the story of how the Bleeding Nun's ghost haunts the Castle of Lindenberg, Raymond asks her whether she believes the story and she replies "How can you ask such a question? No, no, Alphonso! I have too much reason to lament superstition’s influence to be its Victim myself". It is not until the Bleeding Nun appears to Raymond at night that the idea of the existence of the supernatural begins to be a reality. The Wandering Jew's appearance coincides with this first instance of the supernatural. He can see the Bleeding Nun, proving that she is not a figment of Raymond's imagination. His supernatural abilities give access to the Bleeding Nun's story and provide plausibility to the existence of the supernatural. He also has the power to free Raymond from her presence. The later confirmation of Raymond's uncle to the existence of the Wandering Jew allows the whole story to be taken for fact. This establishes the reality of the supernatural and lays the groundwork for Matilda's later use of magic and her and Ambrosio's interaction with evil spirits.

=== Characteristics of the French Revolution ===
It is unclear which side Lewis stood on when it came to the French Revolution; however, one thing is sure: he was influenced by it, as seen in his work. For example, Ambrosio is a devout Monk who believes he is incapable of human error and finds himself a prisoner by the lustful desires of his heart. Still, the willpower he exemplifies to repress his desires represents the problems during the French Revolution—a struggle for freedom and oppression. Ronald Paulson writes that Ambrosio's desire for sexual freedom results in the restraint of others' liberties. "The Monk was kept in the monastery for so long that when he finally had the opportunity for self-liberation, it cost him his sacred vows of celibacy." In addition, the angry mob murders the nuns for falling into sexual sins, which is the same act that Ambrosio is guilty of; Ronald believes Ambrosio is justified for his actions due to being held captive for so many years. There is a resemblance to the unrest of the French Revolution when the angry mobs murdered the Nuns of St. Clare's. Matthew Lewis uses Gothic fiction to play a role in The Monk by reliving the terror, surprise, and horror of the French Revolution through the lives of his characters.

Equally important, author Daniel Watkins views The Monk as significant to social hierarchy and thinks we should consider the importance of social classes and their violations throughout the novel. Ambrosio's problem with sexuality is not simply an issue of moral conduct but one of political rights. For example, he discusses how "Matilda denies social and patriarchal claims without mentioning class, and even though Ambrosio is attracted to Matilda, he seeks to preserve his sexual purity because of the high standard of class that he represents." Therefore, Matthew Lewis doesn't use Ambrosio's sexuality in the novel to lead the reader to focus on his moral degradation but on the values that have been instilled in him since birth. Ambrosio has entangled himself in a class ranking system, and failing to adhere to its rules results in social collapse. The social hierarchy portrayed in Matthew Lewis's novel is significant to the French Revolution due to its social perception of the characters. During the 1700s, the Kingdom of France established the Ancien Régime, a term for social and political structure also known as the "Third Estate," which was made up of the clergy, the nobility, and the commoners. In The Monk, we see this system of class relations. Lorenzo is a wealthy nobleman, Ambrosio is the clergy, and Antonia is the peasant. During the French Revolution and in the novel, each class of society was expected to behave in a certain way and live up to the standards of their rank.

Matthew Lewis published The Monk when the French Revolution was associated with horror and terror. Łowczanin states that "Lewis wrote The Monk in response to the horrors that revolved around the war, which are seen in how he characterizes women in the novel. The novel's atmosphere focuses on the political upheavals of the anxieties of the time." He speaks about how the Catholic church depicted females as always aiming to broadcast their beauty, especially the Virgin Mary and other saints, and how the novel sought to expose Catholicism by relying on the images of women. To add, the Church and the Revolution used the female body as a display of degradation. On one hand, the female is a representation of beauty and, on the other, is abused at the time of revolt. For example, the once elegant and beautiful Prioress is described in Chapter 10 as beaten, shapeless, and disgusting—one whose lifeless body was dragged through the streets of Madrid. As Edmund Burke's Reflections on the French Revolution (1790) writes, "Lewis represents the female body as beautified and mutilated." Łowczanin thinks the horrors of the time affected the artistic imagination of many authors, leading them to channel their fears through their writings. Gothic is used metaphorically rather than literally because many writers sought coping mechanisms for what happened in the 1790s.

== Adaptations ==
While not a direct adaptation E. T. A. Hoffmann's 1815 novel Die Elixiere des Teufels (The Devil's Elixirs) is based on the basic idea of The Monk and draws heavily from its themes of the corruption of a monk of unknown descent, who is celebrated for his sermons, his involvement in an incestuous affair and temptation by the devil. Lewis' work is also mentioned at one point by a character, who talks about having read it.

La nonne sanglante, a 5-act play by Auguste Anicet-Bourgeois and Julien de Mallian, which premiered on 16 February 1835 in Paris at the Théâtre de la Porte Saint-Martin, was very popular in its day. The legendary actress Mlle Georges created the role of Marie de Rudenz. The melodrama derives its title and certain images and motifs from The Monk.

Maria de Rudenz is a tragic opera by Gaetano Donizetti (1797–1848). The libretto by Salvadore Cammarano is based on a 5-act French play (1835), La nonne sanglante, by Auguste Anicet-Bourgeois and Julien de Mallian, a drama informed by motifs and imagery from The Monk. The opera premiered at the Teatro La Fenice in Venice, 30 January 1838, with soprano Carolina Ungher (1803–1877) singing the eponymous role.

La nonne sanglante (The Bloody Nun), freely based on The Monk, is a five-act opera by Charles Gounod to a libretto by Eugène Scribe and Germain Delavigne. Written between 1852 and 1854, it was first produced on 18 October 1854 at the Salle Le Peletier by the Paris Opéra. Soprano Anne Poinsot created the role of Agnès.

Edward Loder used the work as the basis for his 1855 opera Raymond and Agnes.

The French writer Antonin Artaud's only full-length novel bears the same name and is a "loose translation" of Lewis's work.

Luis Buñuel and Jean-Claude Carrière attempted to film a version of The Monk in the 1960s, but the project was halted due to lack of funds. Buñuel's friend, the Greek director Ado Kyrou, used this script as the basis for his 1972 film version. Le Moine (English The Monk) boasted an international cast with Franco Nero in the title role. The film also starred Nathalie Delon, Eliana de Santis, Nadja Tiller and Nicol Williamson.

BBC Radio 4 broadcast a two-hour audio adaptation by Allan McClelland in December 1985, with Michael Pennington as Ambrosio and Sorcha Cussack as Rosario/Matilda. It was rebroadcast on BBC Radio 4 Extra in 2025.

Juan Tovar, Mexican author, wrote a theatrical adaptation "El Monje" in 1986. It was originally planned as an interlude to his work The manuscript found in Saragossa (adaptation of the novel of the same name by Jan Potocki).

In 1990 The Monk was produced by Celtic Films. It starred Paul McGann as the title character, and was written and directed by Francisco Lara Polop.

Grant Morrison and Klaus Janson's 1990 DC Comics graphic novel Batman: Gothic relies heavily and overtly upon The Monk, combined with elements of Don Giovanni, as the inspiration for the plot.

A film adaption, The Monk, was made by French-German director Dominik Moll in 2011. It was shot in Santes Creus, Girona and Madrid and stars Vincent Cassel, Déborah François, Geraldine Chaplin, and Sergi López. Shooting was scheduled for 12 weeks in April 2010. The film released in France on 13 July 2011, and in the UK on 27 April 2012.

A stage adaptation by Benji Sperring for Tarquin Productions ran at Baron's Court Theatre, London, from 16 October to 3 November 2012.

One of the three fictional films shown in the 2022 video game Immortality is an adaptation of the novel, called Ambrosio.
