= The Necromancers: The Best of Black Magic and Witchcraft =

1971 anthology of occult stories edited by Peter Haining

First edition

The Necromancers: The Best of Black Magic And Witchcraft is an anthology of occult stories edited by Peter Haining and published by Hodder and Stoughton in 1971 (ISBN 9780340125960). The collection of stories in this anthology is a blend of fact and fiction. This anthology includes stories, folklore, essays and focuses on witchcraft and Satanism. The editor's preface by Peter Haining provides a brief overview of the theme of this compilation and it is followed by an introduction by Robert Bloch.

== Stories collected ==
Title	Author
Modern Witchcraft	Robert Graves
Black Magic Today	Rollo Ahmed
The Black Lodge	Aleister Crowley
The Sacrifice	Betty May
The Sorcerers	W. B. Yeats
A Life For A Life	Dennis Wheatley
The Witches’ Sabbat	C. W. Olliver
The Salem Mass	Nathaniel Hawthorne
The Tryals Of The New England Witches	Cotton Mather
The Lancashire Witches	W. Harrison Ainsworth
An Initiation To Witchcraft	Margaret Murray
A Pact With The Devil	N/A
How To Raise A Spirit	N/A
The Black Goat Of Brandenberg	N/A
My Experiences In Necromancy	Benvenuto Cellini
The Necromancer	Lawrence Flammenberg
Gavon’s Eve	E. F. Benson
The Confession Of The Witches Of Elfdale	N/A
The Witch Finders	Sax Rohmer
The Witch-Baiter	Robert Anthony
The Spell On witchcraft	P. T. Barnum
Familiars	Frank Hamel
Saunder’s Little Friend	August Derleth
The Chambre Ardente Affair	Ronald Seth
The Tarn Of Sacrifice	Algernon Blackwood
The Hell-Fire Clubs	Montague Summers
At The Heart Of It	Michael Harrison
Beelzebub	Robert Bloch
