= Falnama =

Book of omens in 16th-, 17th-century Islamic culture

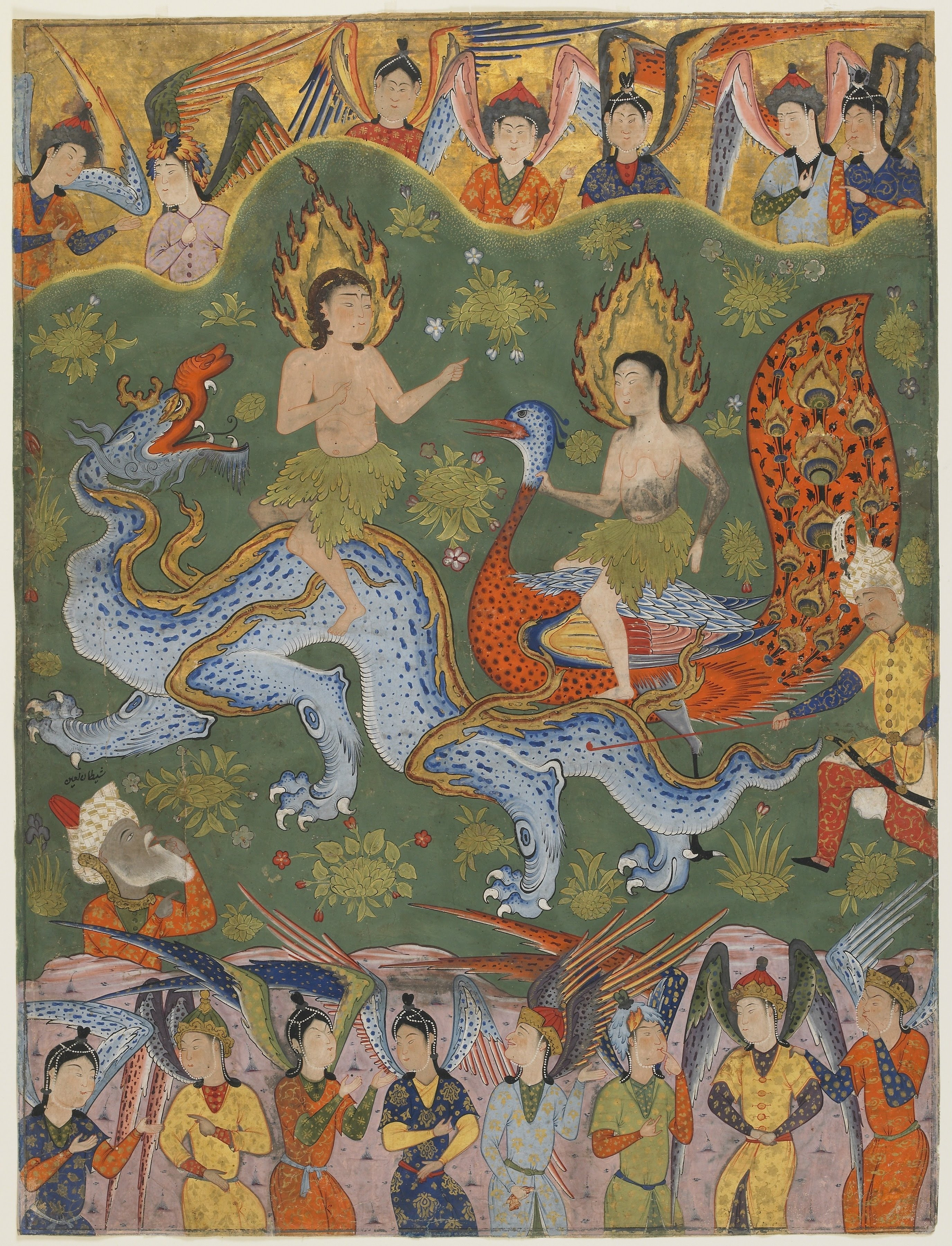
Adam and Eve being cast out from the Garden of Eden in the Dispersed Falnama

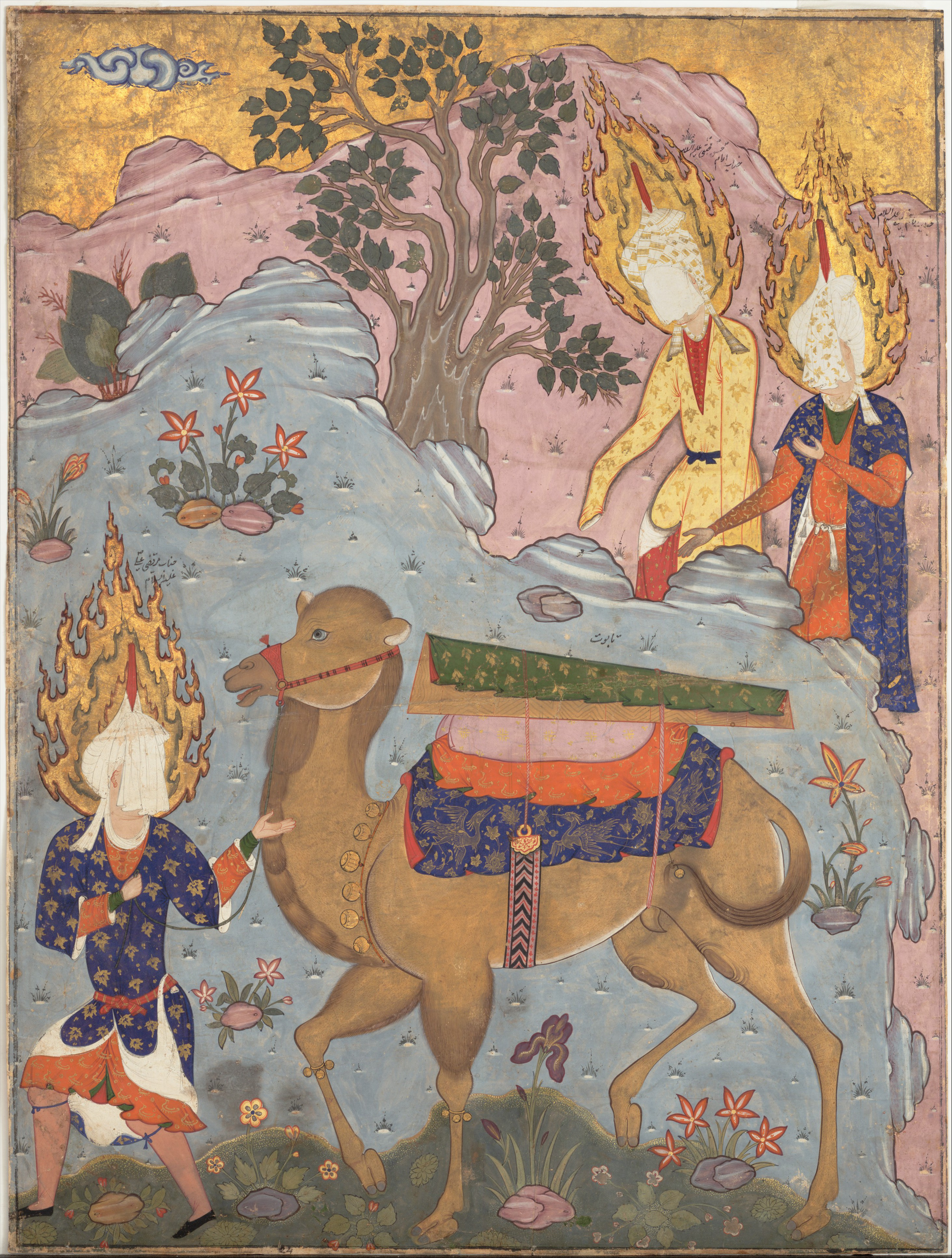
Coffin of Imam 'Ali from the Dispersed Falnama

The Persian word Falnama (Persian: فالنامه, romanized: falnameh, lit. 'omen/divination book') covers two forms of bibliomancy (fortune-telling using a book) used historically in Iran, Turkey, and India. Quranic Falnamas were sections at the end of Quran manuscripts used for fortune-telling based on a grid. In the 16th century, Falnama manuscripts were introduced that used a different system; individuals performed purification rituals, opened a random page in the book and interpreted their fortune in light of the painting and its accompanying text. Only a few illustrated Falnamas now survive; these were commissioned by rich patrons and are unusually large books for the time, with bold, finely executed paintings. These paintings illustrate historical and mythological figures as well as events and figures associated with the Abrahamic religions.

== Creation ==
Bibliomancy has a long history in Islamic culture, using both secular and religious books, especially the Quran. It was common for Quran manuscripts produced in India and Iran to have folios at the end specifically for divination ("Quranic falnamas"), from at least the late 14th century to the 19th. Their popularity intensified in Safavid Iran in the mid-16th century during the reign of Shah Tahmasp. This period also saw the first creation of dedicated Falnama manuscripts, whose popularity spread in the 17th century.

Falnama manuscripts were unusually large books; the surviving examples range from 40 centimetres (16 in) to more than 66 centimetres (26 in) high. The paintings combined secular and religious imagery and their depiction of religious and mythical figures was very influential on other works. Each painting told the story of an event, although there was no narrative for the book as a whole; the order of paintings was random.

== Use ==
Using a Quranic Falnama for bibliomancy involved performing ritual ablutions, reading certain verses from the Quran, then opening the book at random. The tables at the end of the book told the reader how to interpret the omen, and in some versions had numerical tables telling the reader to count a certain number of pages, lines, or words within the Quran and read the word at that position.

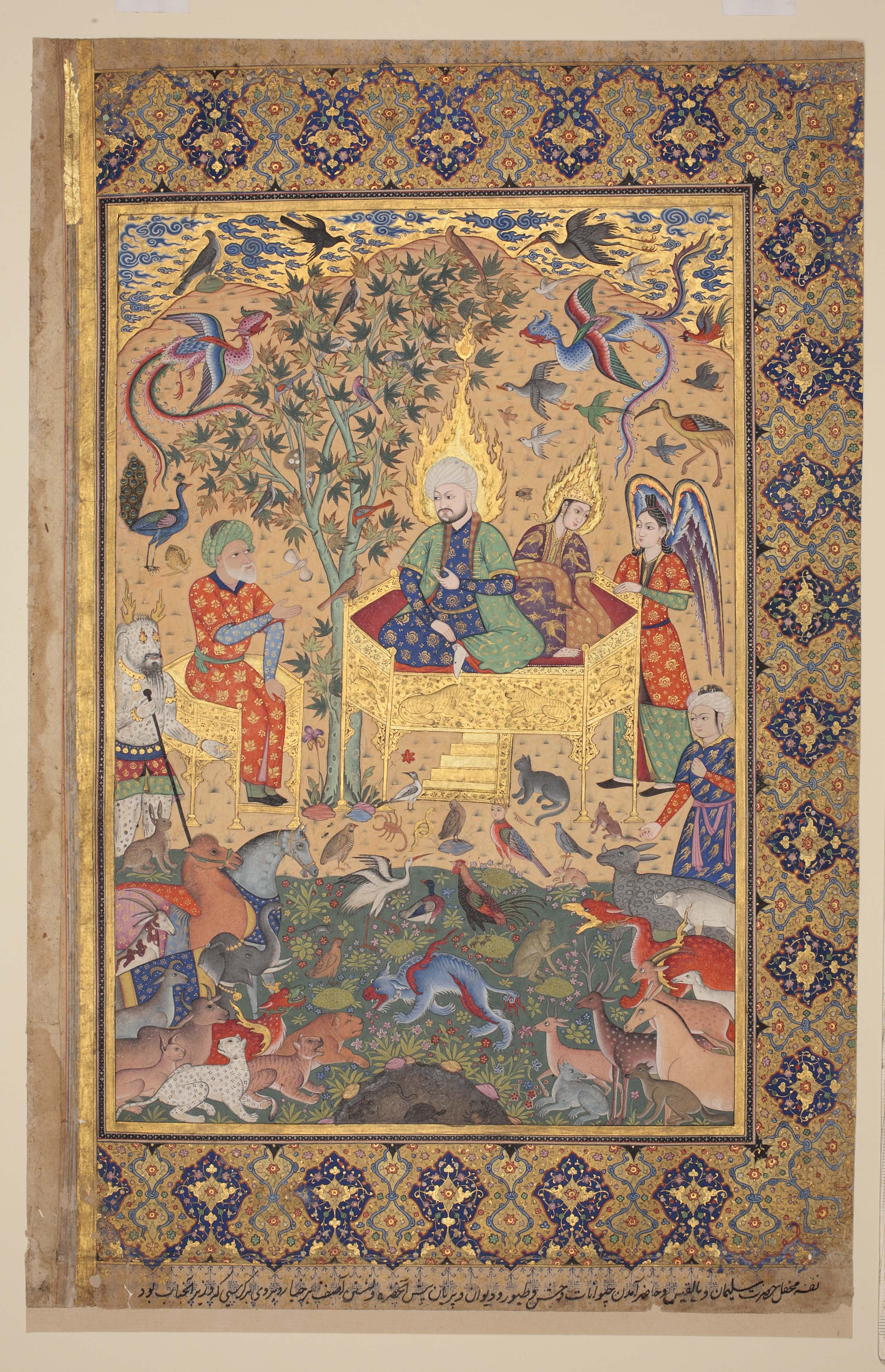
Animals gathering before King Solomon and Queen Bilqis from the Khalili Falnama

Falnama manuscripts built on this tradition. They were consulted to divine the prospects for a major decision (such as a business venture, marriage, or house move) or to divine the condition of absent relatives or friends. Each spread had a painting on the right and text on the left; thus Arabic and Persian readers saw the painting first and then its explanation. To answer a question, readers would perform ablutions, recite prayers from the Quran and then open the book at a random page. The text explained whether the prediction was favourable, unfavourable, or middling. For example, a painting of the Sun would suggest a favourable outcome while a villain usually meant a disastrous outcome. The middle prediction is thought to mean a situation that does not initially seem good but will improve. Falnama manuscripts did not always agree in their interpretations; an event presented as fortunate by one could be unfortunate according to another. To avoid the worst outcomes, the text recommended pious acts such as prayer, pilgrimage, or kindness to others.

Fortune-tellers gave Falnama readings for money on the streets of Istanbul and Isfahan. Some wealthy families commissioned their own Falnama manuscripts; all of the present surviving examples came about in this way.

== Surviving Falnama manuscripts ==
=== The Dispersed Falnama ===
The Dispersed Falnama, also called the Falnama Tahmasbi, is the oldest surviving example. It is so-named because there are folios in many collections in different countries including the Arthur M. Sackler Gallery, the Metropolitan Museum of Art, and the Worcester Art Museum in the United States. It was commissioned during the reign of Shah Tahmasp in the mid-1550s to early 1560s, a time of political and military upheaval. The Islamic calendar was approaching the year 1000 and there was a mood of end time anxiety. Many of the paintings involve Ali, an important figure in Safavid Iran's state religion, Shia Islam. This manuscript contains the earliest known depiction in Islamic art of Adam and Eve in the Garden of Eden.

=== The Khalili Falnama ===
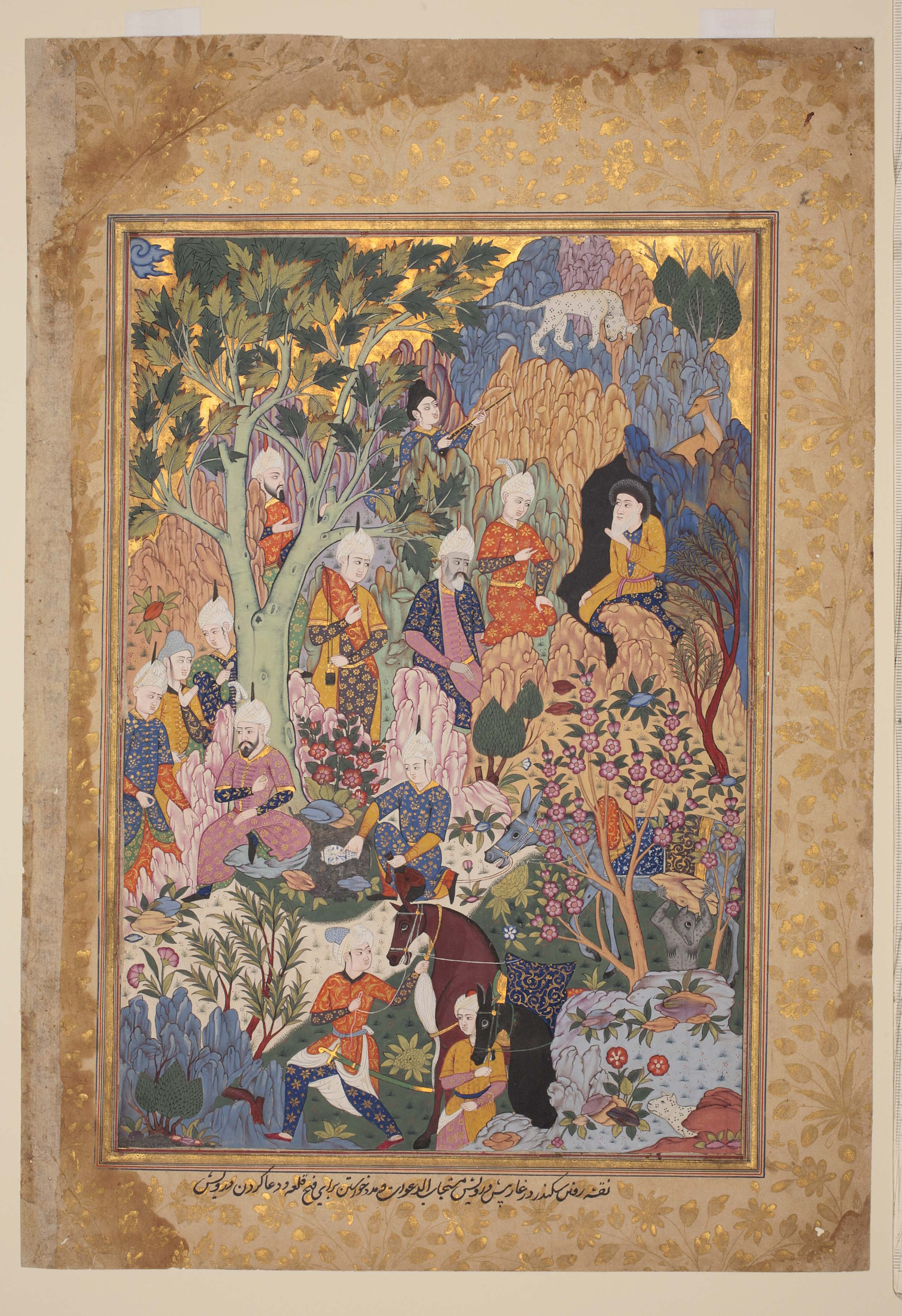
Alexander the Great asking a dervish for knowledge before a battle from the Khalili Falnama

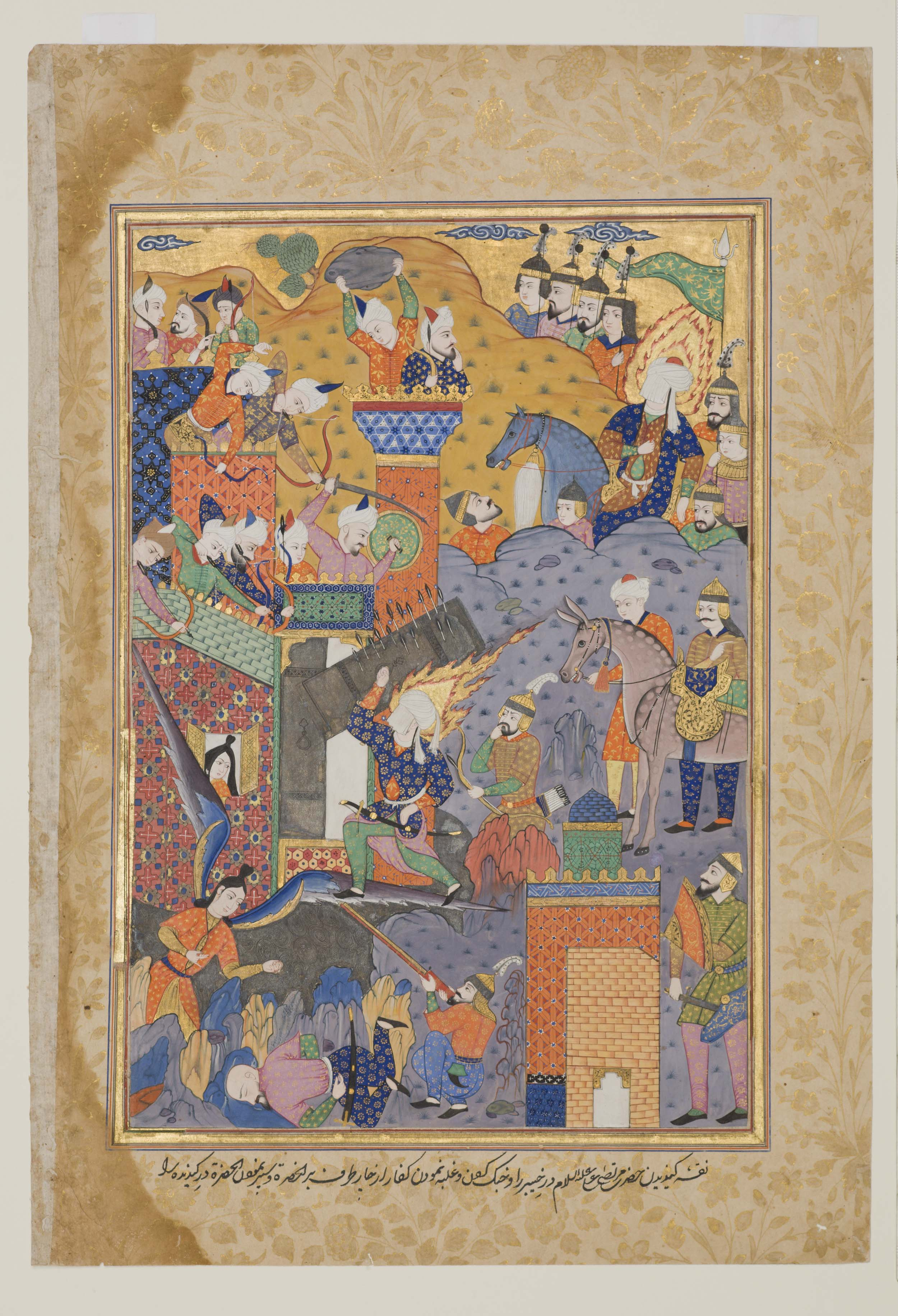
Ali at the Battle of Khaybar from the Khalili Falnama

The Khalili Collection of Islamic Art includes a Falnama manuscript produced during the Qutb Shahi dynasty in 17th century Golconda, in what is now Hyderabad. This is the only surviving illustrated Falnama to have been made in South Asia. It was most likely created between 1610 and 1630. In this period, Golconda's alliance with Safavid Iran was of great military importance and was celebrated many times in art and literature, of which this Falnama is one example. The Khalili Falnama is more opulent than any other Falnama manuscript, with paintings and calligraphy extensively decorated in gold, lapis blue, and other precious materials. The expensive production of the manuscript and its textual advice relating to the business of court suggest it was made for a noble, or even royal, patron. The artists, like the author of the text, are not recorded.

The manuscript is 41 centimetres (16 in) tall, with paintings and textual panels each 30.5 centimetres (12.0 in) by 21 centimetres (8.3 in), excluding their decorative borders. There are 35 spreads that each combine a full-page painting and text, plus two additional paintings. A second caption in Persian (in nastaliq script) was added to each painting some time after the manuscript's creation. There are some similarities, both in the text and paintings, to the Dispersed Falnama, but most of the scenes are not present in that earlier manuscript. The style of the paintings combines a strong Safavid influence with the bright colours associated with local Deccani art. The figures' clothing, for example, matches Safavid dress rather than the much hotter environment of Golconda. The paintings are thus a guide to the design of Safavid buildings, styles of dress, and pottery ware, reproducing the geometric patterns and other design motifs used by Safavid artists, interpreted through subtle influences from Indian art.

The manuscript has many similarities with an illustrated volume of poetry presently at the Salar Jung Museum in Hyderabad; these include the use of bright colours and large amounts of gold as well as many pictorial elements and choices of imagery. That volume is known to have been commissioned by the sultan Muhammad Quli Qutb Shah, whose support for art included funding a workshop bringing together local and foreign artists. This suggests, but does not firmly establish, Muhammad Quli Qutb Shah as the noble for whom the Khalili Falnama was originally created.

Each page of text consists of nine lines: two lines in thuluth script convey a poetic couplet, often drawn from a well-known text, while the remaining seven lines contain the divination in nastaliq script. The language of the text is Persian with occasional phrases from Arabic.

In its textual recommendations and choice of imagery, the Khalili Falnama is explicitly promotional of Shia Islam. Its paintings are inspired by sources including the Qisas al-Anbiya' (Tales of the Prophets) of Al-Kisa'i, the Khamsa of Nizami, and the life of the Islamic prophet Muhammad. Unlike the other Falnama manuscripts, it does not include any imagery from the zodiac. Twenty of the paintings are of subjects or stories that do not appear in any other Falnama, including the infant Moses in the lap of the Pharaoh and the murder of John the Baptist. Where it includes the same stories as the other manuscripts, it usually represents them with different scenes. It is the only surviving Falnama to depict a person from the era in which these manuscripts were created: Shah Tamasp, who had died in 1576.

As well as the central figures of each scene, the paintings also include groups of spectators reacting to the events, each figure having a unique combination of dress and physical characteristics. The paintings show:

| Painting | Omen |
|---|---|
| Ja'far ibn Abi Talib before the king of Aksum The king is not named but the figure in the painting is identifiable as Najashi. | — |
| Alexander the Great meeting Plato The identity of the figures consulted by Alexander is not known for sure. Although the text mentions Plato who is possibly sitting next to Aristotle, the figures are shown veiled with flaming haloes usually reserved for prophets. This suggests the painting was intended to depict the prophets Khizr and Elijah. | Good |
| Muhammad distributing the water of immortality in Paradise This scene has previously been interpreted as from Nizami's story of Khizr finding the water of life. The text refers to the Pool of Kawthar in Paradise from which it is said that Muhammad will distribute water on the Day of Judgement. | Good |
| The death of Alexander the Great This is a scene from the Shahnameh, depicted in a similar way to earlier Shahnamah manuscripts. | Bad/Middle |
| Jesus fighting the false prophet Al-Dajjal, watched by Imam al-Mahdi The story of the young Jesus killing the antichrist, Al-Dajjal, with a spear is taken from Hadith literature. | Good |
| The liar Zaynab being devoured by lions at the command of Imam al-Hadi The caption identifies the veiled, haloed figure as Imam Riza, though this is presumably an error as in the traditional story it is Imam al-Hadi who exposes a liar by feeding her to lions. | Bad |
| Ladies, astonished by the beauty of Joseph, cutting their fingers on fruit knives This scene is from the story of Yusuf and Zulaikha in which Yusuf (Joseph) is brought into the home of Zulaikha (Potiphar's wife). Women are so distracted by his appearance that they accidentally slice their own fingers instead of the lemons they were cutting. | Good |
| The prophet Saleh and his miracle of the camel The story of Saleh miraculously causing a camel to be born from a rock appears several times in the Quran. Although many other paintings depict this story, the composition of this one is unique. | Middle |
| Muhammad visiting the Kaaba The Kaaba is not shown as a black cube, matching its real appearance, but as a colourful domed structure resembling a tomb. An unidentified crowned man is also shown next to the structure. | Good |
| Khidr and Elijah finding the water of life, watched by Alexander The story of Alexander travelling to the Land of Darkness to find the water of life, with his two spiritual advisors, is told by Nizami in the Iskandar-namah (book of Alexander). | Good |
| The Day of Judgement This complex painting includes many aspects of the traditional Islamic view of the Day of Judgement, including the angels Azrafil and Jibrīl. Groups of sinners are shown with physical deformities corresponding to their sins. | Middle |
| Jesus raising the dead The text names the veiled figure as Jesus and that is how the painting has been described by some authors. Parikh (2022) disputes this and labels the painting "The Prophet Muhammad reviving a sick child" since the miracles of Muhammad are a common topic in Falnama paintings. Similar paintings appear in two other Falnama manuscripts, one unlabelled and the other explicitly identifying its subject as Muhammad. | Good |
| Muhammad's flight from Mecca to Jerusalem upon his steed, Buraq The lower half of the painting shows the Al-Aqsa Mosque and its towers. | Good |
| Majnun fainting at the sight of Layla's beauty The third of Nizami's five poems in the Khamsa tells the romance of Layla and Majnun. Most of the painting illustrates details of life in Layla's Bedouin tribe. | Middle |
| Ali rescuing Salman Al-Farsi from a lion Ali, mounted on Muhammad's mule Duldul and wielding the double-pointed sword Dhulfiqar, dominates the scene, representing his power and that of Islam. | Good |
| Muhammad sleeping in Abu Bakr's lap This painting combines a Quranic story about Muhammad and Abu Bakr hiding in a cave with a folkloric story about a dove and spider concealing the cave. | Middle |
| The "Five Holy Ones": Muhammad, his daughter Fatimah, Ali, Hasan and Husayn This is not a scene from a narrative, but shows the five members of the holy family, each veiled and haloed, with attendants and spectators. | Good |
| The Sufi mystic Ahmad-i Jam riding a lion This scene is inspired both by Sadid al-Din Muhammad Ghaznavi's Maqamat-i Zhandah-pil and a rival account of Ahmad-i Jam's life, Siyar al-aqtab. | Good |
| Barsisa, a devotee who succumbed to the Devil, hanged for adultery The story of Barsisa, a monk who is tempted by the Devil, is told by al-Tabari in the History of the Prophets and Kings. | Bad |
| Shaddad dying outside the gates of Paradise Shaddad is briefly mentioned in the Quran and the tale of him meeting the Angel of Death is recounted in Mirkhvand's Rawżat aṣ-ṣafāʾ (Garden of Purity). | Bad |
| The slaughter of Ghilman by Ali A ghilman is a prisoner of war, so this scene presumably refers to the execution of Nadr ibn al-Harith in the aftermath of Muhammad's triumph at the Battle of Badr. Muhammad appears in the painting, as do his grandsons Hasan and Husayn. | Bad |
| Animals gathering before King Solomon and Queen Bilqis This scene is similar to one depicted in frontispieces for Nizami's Khamsa. The animals are rendered in great detail and in a combination of Persian and Indian styles. This spread differs from the rest of the volume, with a more colourful border and text that is decorated with cloud motifs. | Good |
| Shah Tahmasp and his army in battle Corpses and severed heads litter the scene of an active battle between Tahmasp's forces and Ottoman Turks. Tahmasp used dreams and divination to guide many of his decisions, so he is a natural subject for a painting used in divination. | Good |
| Before Yaqub, Joseph's brothers accuse a wolf of eating Joseph and the wolf denies it This story is mentioned briefly in the Quran and expanded upon in the Qisas al-Anbiya (Stories of the Prophets). | Middle |
| Karkhi, porter at the tomb of Imam Riza, being honoured This is an almost exact copy, in better condition, of a mid-16th-century painting titled Scene from a Mausoleum which is presently in the David Collection. | Good |
| Mary and the infant Jesus visited by Zacharias and John the Baptist Rather than a specific narrative, this painting illustrates the parallels between Jesus and John the Baptist that are discussed in the Quran. The text on the neighbouring folio is unrelated to the painting. | Good |
| The construction of Noah's Ark The story of Nūḥ and his ark is mentioned in the Quran as well as subsequent Islamic literature. The Qisas al-Anbiya describes wood being cut and shaped with carpentry tools: an activity that fills almost all of this painting. | Middle |
| Muhammad preaching in Medina Muhammad, veiled and with a flaming halo, addresses an audience of six unidentified prophets who are shown faceless and also haloed, while the surrounding audience of angels is also shown without faces. | Good |
| The death of John the Baptist The execution takes place in the lower third of the painting, much of which is given over to King Joshua and his court in a scene that seems to come from the historian al-Tabari. The text on the neighbouring folio is unrelated to the painting. | Good |
| The tyrant Murra ibn Qays miraculously sliced in two as he tries to desecrate the tomb of Ali The painting depicts the shrine of Ali, from which Ali's two fingers protrude, haloed. Murra, having attempted to desecrate the shrine, is shown chopped in two. | Good |
| The Queen of the Peris (fairies) at her throne in the garden of Iram The scene seems to be based on depictions of courtly entertainment though with angels, rather than people, enjoying the food, music, and flowers. | Good |
| Pharaoh with the infant Moses This is the only depiction of the infant Moses in any Falnama illustration, showing him on the Pharaoh's lap. Next to the Pharaoh is his wife, Asiya. | Good |
| The death of Khusraw Parviz The story of the death of Khusraw at the hands of his son is found in the Nizami's Khamsa, elaborating on a narrative from the Shahnameh. | Bad |
| Zacharias hiding inside a tree, discovered by Satan and other enemies The Muslim legend of Zacharias is told by al-Tabari in the History of the Prophets and Kings, drawing from the story of Isaiah in Jewish and Christian traditions. | Bad |
| Ali at the Battle of Khaybar, being attacked from four sides and using the gates of Khaybar as a shield The tale of Ali lifting the door with the strength of eight men is told by al-Tabari. In this painting, he is watched over by Muhammad on horseback. | Good |
| Khusraw and Shirin hunting Nizami's Khamsa describes many hunting scenes involving Khusraw. This painting seems to combine multiple such episodes. | Good |
| Alexander asking a dervish for advice and prayers before attacking a fortress This scene is based on Nizami's Iskandar-namah but shows the figures in a natural setting, surrounded by plants and animals, rather than in the fortress mentioned in the story. | — |

The Khalili Falnama was the topic of a 2014 doctoral thesis at the University of Cambridge by Rachel Parikh. A complete facsimile of the manuscript, with translation and scholarly commentary by Parikh, was published in 2022.

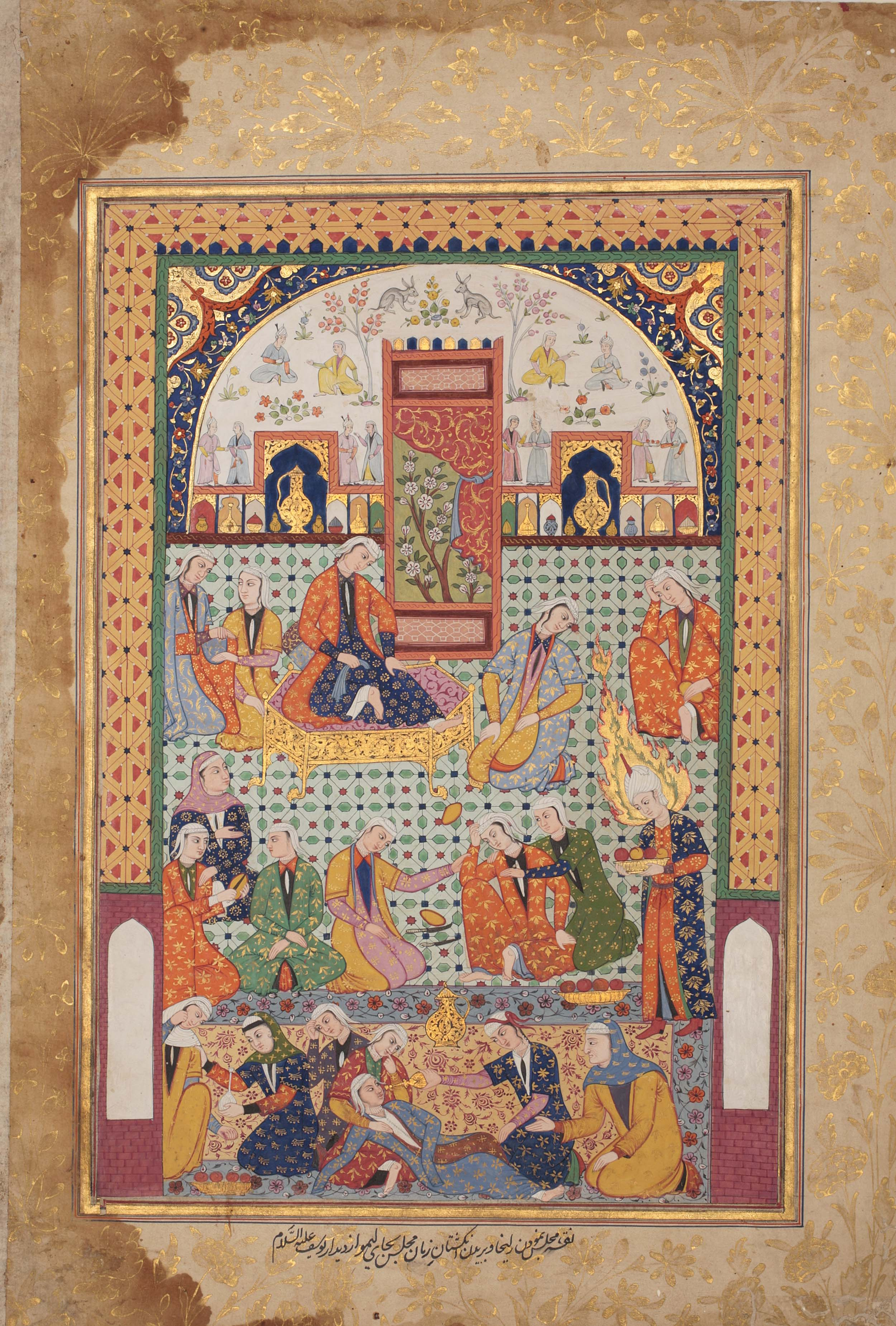
Ladies, astonished by the beauty of Joseph, cutting their fingers on fruit knives

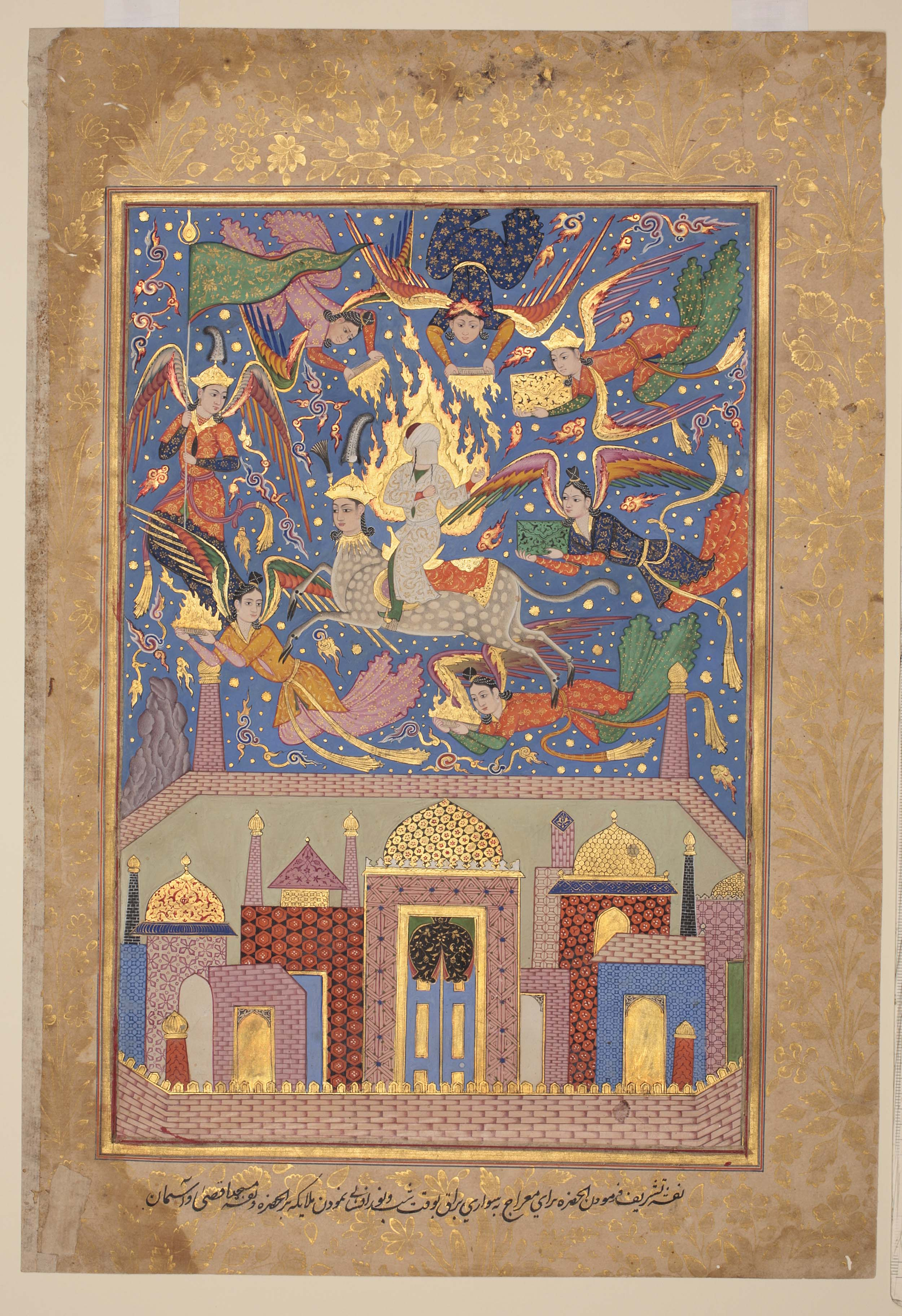
Muhammad's flight from Mecca to Jerusalem upon his steed, Buraq

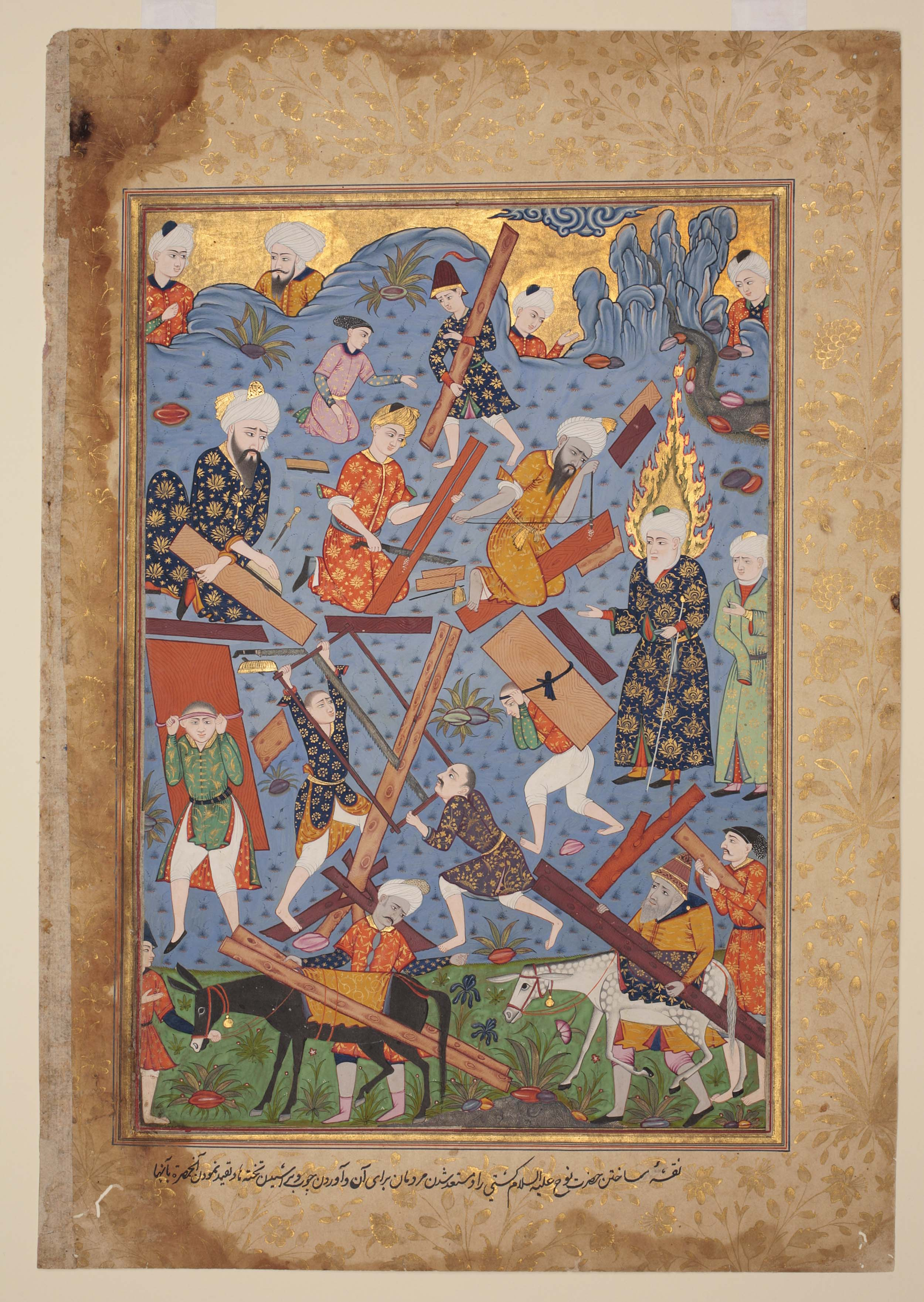
The construction of Noah's Ark

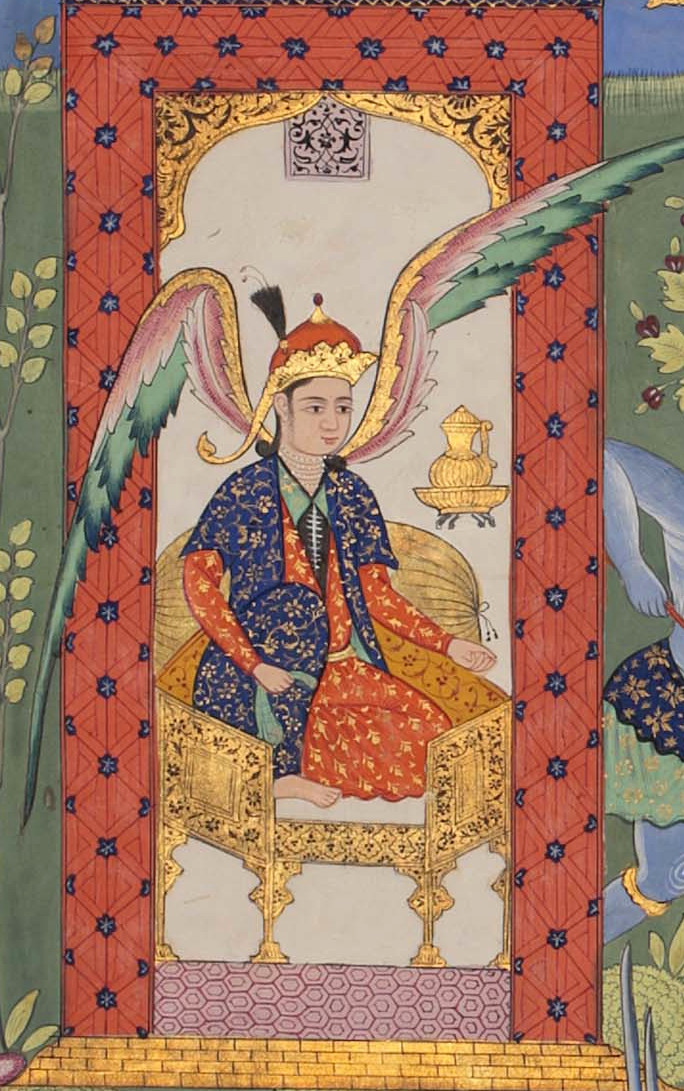
The Queen of the Peris at her throne in the garden of Iram

=== Others ===
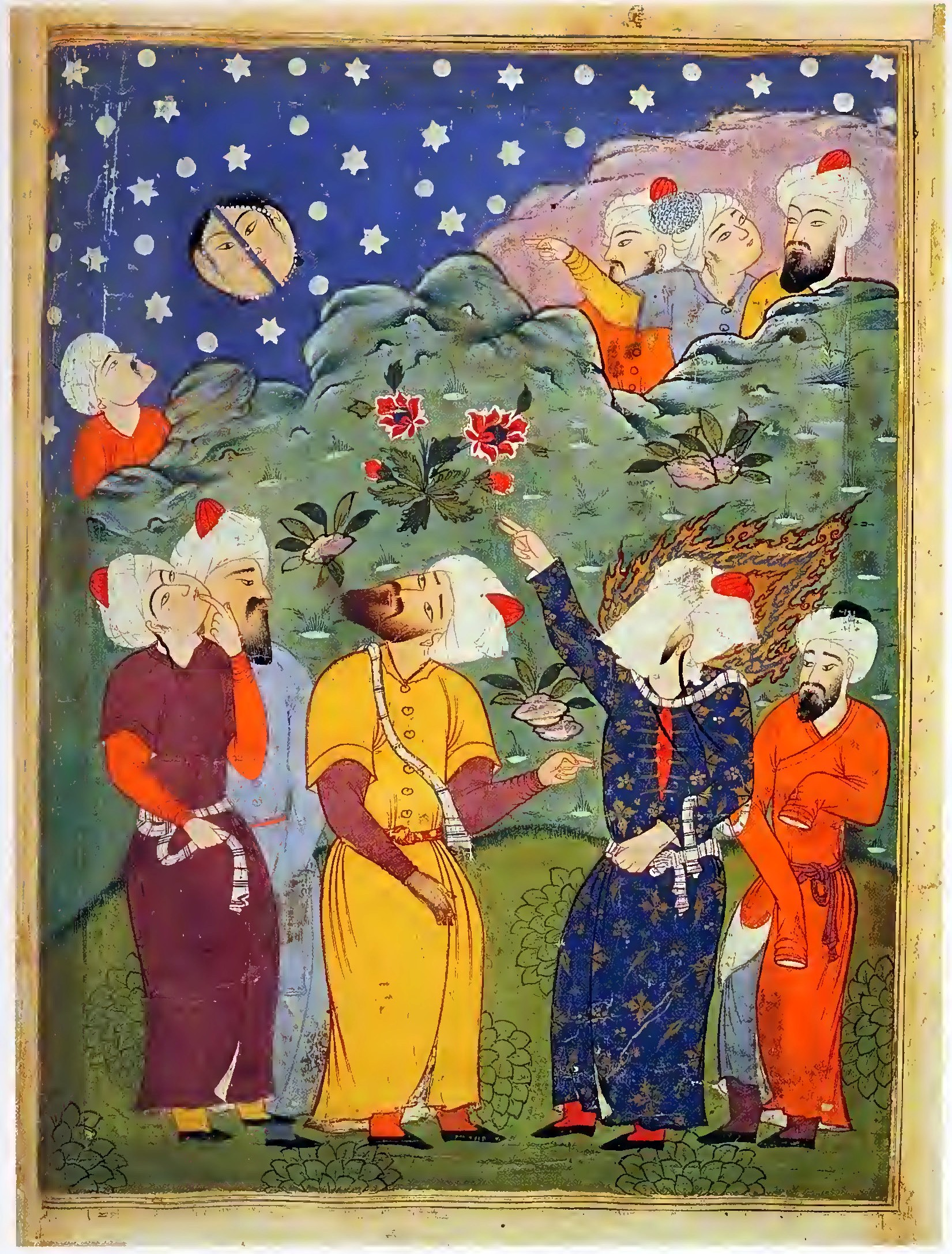
"Muhammad splits the Moon" from the Dresden Falnama

Four more illustrated manuscripts of the Falnama have survived from the 16th and 17th centuries. A 16th-century manuscript is now held by the National Museum of Ethnology in Leiden, the Netherlands. Its 35 paintings include one each for the Moon, Sun, Mercury, Mars, Jupiter, Venus, Saturn and the realm of Paradise. Five more paintings show episodes from the life of Ali and many others have scenes inspired by the Quran. The Kaaba, Noah's Ark, the Last Judgement, and Layla and Majnun have their own paintings. The Dresden Falnama is a Persian volume with similar content which was produced from the 1540s to the 1570s. It is now in the Saxon State and University Library Dresden. The Topkapı Persian Falnama, with 41 double-page spreads, dates from the late 17th century and is now in the collection of the Topkapı Palace in Turkey. The palace also holds an Ottoman Turkish version of the Falnama created for the Sultan Ahmed I in the early 17th century, with 59 double-page spreads. Similarities between these four manuscripts' paintings suggest that they were influenced by common depictions that have not survived.

== See also ==
- Media related to Manuscripts of the Falnama at Wikimedia Commons
