= The Necromancer; or, The Tale of the Black Forest =

1794 novel by Ludwig Flammenberg

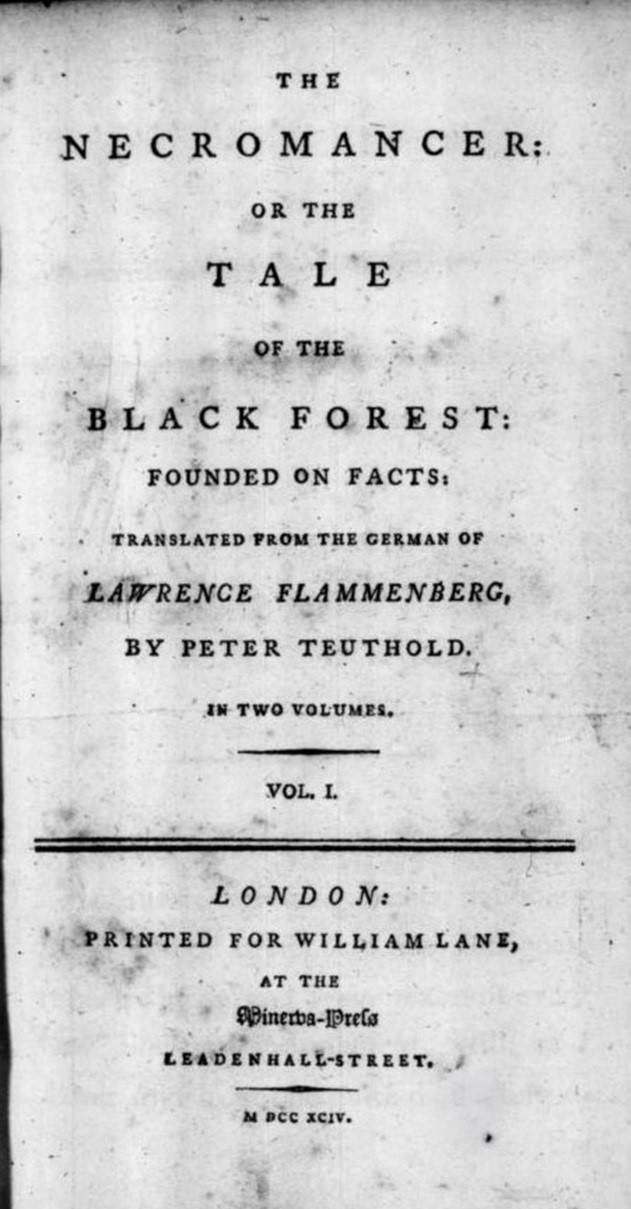
- First edition title page
- Author: Karl Friedrich Kahlert using the pseudonym Lawrence Flammenber
- Translator: Peter Teuthold
- Language: German
- Genre: Gothic fiction
- Publication date: 1794
- Publication place: Germany, England
- Media type: Print (Hardback & Paperback)
- Pages: c.200 pp

The Necromancer; or, The Tale of the Black Forest is a Gothic novel written by Karl Friedrich Kahlert under the alias Lawrence Flammenberg and translated by Peter Teuthold that was first published in 1794. It is one of the seven 'horrid novels' lampooned by Jane Austen in Northanger Abbey. It was once thought not to exist except in the text of Northanger Abbey.

Set in the Black Forest in Germany, the novel consists of a series of lurid tales of hauntings, violence, killings and the supernatural featuring the adventures of Hermann and Helfried and the mysterious wizard Volkert the Necromancer, who has seemingly come back from the dead.

It has recently been republished in a modern edition by Valancourt Books which confirms the identity of the book's German author. Originally said to have been "Translated from the German of Lawrence Flammenberg by Peter Teuthold," a number of its readers, including scholarly readers, assumed this to be a way of adding to the authenticity of a Gothic text by claiming a German genealogy, a common British publishing practice in its day. However, this novel was originally written in German by Karl Friedrich Kahlert and then translated by Peter Teuthold.

Teuthold's translated version of the novel differs from Kahlert's original German version substantially, most noticeably in the conscious addition of a plagiarized portion of the tale forming the robber Christian Wolf's confession from Friedrich Schiller's Der Verbrecher aus verlorner Ehre, written in 1786. Though very little is known about Teuthold, his translation, written unfaithfully to the original German text, reveals him to be "a conservative Englishman with anti-Jacobin sympathies who deliberately designed his translation to discredit German literature." Furthermore, the disorganization of the narrative (i.e., its confusing structure of frame narratives) was a result of Teuthold's poor management of his translation sources. "What might have been an anthology of separate legends and supernatural tales about the Black Forest was hastily amalgamated into a nearly incomprehensible Germanic Gothic meant to allure the [publishing company's] readers." One English contemporary review, published in 1794, comments on the poor quality of Teuthold's translation: "This work calls itself a translation from the German: out of respect to such of our countrymen as are authors, we heartily wish it may be a translation. We should be sorry to see an English original so full of absurdities."

Contemporary English reviews of the novel mostly provide commentary on the superstitious beliefs (e.g., the existence of necromancy, curses, etc.) of the characters of the novel, which most reviewers generalize to the German people in their reviews: "In Germany, no doubt, such [superstitions] have made a wider impression and progress than in our country: since raising ghosts is an operation of frequent recurrence in The Necromancer." Another article says of the novel that "It exposes the arts which have been practiced in a particular part of Germany, for carrying on a series of nocturnal depredations in the neighbourhood, and infusing into the credulous multitude a firm belief in the existence of sorcery." Another review expounds on the usefulness of the book in disarming superstitious beliefs via entertainment: "To those who are fond of reading stories of ghosts, this book may be entertaining, and also instructive, as it may tend to [show] how easily superstition may be worked upon without any foundation in reality."

In 1944, Michael Sadleir noted that "For magniloquent descriptions of 'horrid' episodes, for sheer stylistic fervour in the handling of the supernatural, the work can rank high among its contemporaries." In 1987, Frederick Frank wrote that the novel is a "splendid instance of the Schauerroman at a point of no rational return."

== Plot summary ==
=== Part 1 ===
Herman and Hellfried, two former university classmates and friends, reunite on a stormy night after thirty years of separation due to occupations that forced them to travel. While recounting their past travels, the conversation quickly turns to the supernatural, and the two begin to relate a series of wondrous adventures. Hellfried begins the narrative with a story about a mysterious English lord who is lodging in the same inn as he. During his stay there, Hellfried is plagued by nightmares and apparitions, and loses several valuables and all of his money. The lord inexplicably returns several of his belongings and provides a loan. Hellfried, seeking an explanation to the series of events that have befallen him, meets an unknown figure in a late night rendezvous that claims to have the answers he seeks. The meeting ends in disaster, as Hellfried somehow fractures his leg and is bedridden for months. The story concludes with Hellfried returning to the inn and continuing on his travels.

After a night of rest, Herrman continues the exchange of tales with an account of his travels with a ‘Baron de R–,’ for whom he was a governor. While the two traveled through Germany, they came upon a village in the titular Black Forest. Herrman and the Baron soon discover that the vacant castle in the village is haunted by its former lord, “a very wicked and irreligious man who found great delight in tormenting the poor pesants.” After joining forces with a Danish lieutenant, the group encounters a slew of supernatural and horrific events, culminating in a dark ritual in a dungeon involving an old sorcerer who is revealed as the Necromancer. They eventually escape, and arrive to their destination safely, thus concluding the story. Following several more days of conversation, Herrman and Hellfried part ways. Before Herrman leaves Hellfried's estate, he gives him a manuscript of further adventures that comprise Part II of the novel.

=== Part 2 ===
Part Two continues the novel in epistolary form, with a series of letters from various sources (50). The first is from the Baron to Herrman, describing the former's unexpected reunion with the Lieutenant 20 years after their original adventure in the Black Forest. During this time, The Lieutenant gives the Baron a written account of his adventures.

Having lost one of his favorite servants during the adventure in the Black Forest, the Lieutenant begins a search for new comrades and “hasten[s] to return to the skirts of the Black Forest” (54). He becomes acquainted with an old Austrian officer who also shares tales of the supernatural. The Austrian relays the story of Volkert, a sergeant in his former garrison who “was reported to perform many strange and wonderful exploits” (56). Volkert often dabbled in mysticism as a service to his fellow servicemen and the people of the village in which he was stationed. Volkert channels the husband of a recently widowed woman so that she can learn why he forbade their daughter from marrying her fiancé. The ghost of the father reveals that the fiancé is in fact her brother, and the girl dies of grief soon thereafter. As a result, Volkert ceases to experiment with the occult. At the behest of several soldiers, however, Volkert returns to magic by summoning another foreign Baron who is feuding with an officer in his cohort. The Austrian and his comrades are “chilled with horror” following the incident (66). This foreign Baron later writes to the officer, accusing him of “infernal torrents by supernatural means,”(70) and hastens his arrival to the town to proceed with the duel. Volkert leaves the town knowing that he is at risk of being implicated in the conflict, but not before he informs the town authorities of the duel the morning before it happens. The duel occurs, and the officer from the village is injured while the foreign Baron is arrested. Here the Austrian concludes his story. When the soldiers ask what happened to Volkert, the Austrian says, “he is dead” (76). The Austrian and the Lieutenant depart together and return to the Black Forest in an attempt to get to the bottom of the mystery. When they return to the Haunted Castle, they find a secret passage and overhear a conversation between a band of thieves. They learn that the Lieutenant's servant is still alive. The thieves manage to escape before the heroes can confront them. After another series of minor supernatural events, the heroes decide to confront the Haunted Castle one more time, knowing that the Necromancer is still somehow tied to the myriad supernatural misfortunes that have befallen them. Part II and Volume I ends with the preparations for this endeavor.

=== Part 3 ===
The third part of The Necromancer continues the story of the Lieutenant, as he prepares for his adventure with the Austrian and a miscellany of other officers. They manage to surround the Necromancer in a village inn near the Haunted Castle. After they witness a séance in which the Necromancer summons a phantom, the heroes assault the room. The Austrian realizes that the Necromancer and Volkert are the same person. After a round of brutal interrogation, the officers decide to leave the now enfeebled Necromancer to his own devices. While traveling, the Lieutenant seeks lodging at a suspicious woodman's cabin and is ambushed in the night by “three fellows of a gigantic size” (116). These men capture him and bring him before an assembly of criminals. Among them is Volkert. The Lieutenant is freed from capture thanks to his leniency with Volkert back in the village. As the Lieutenant continues his travels, he is reunited with his lost servant. The servant describes how he was captured and forced to join the same band of thieves that now pervaded the narrative of the novel. With this knowledge, the Lieutenant is able to assist in the capturing of the band and their subsequent trial. Among the imprisoned is Volkert, who explains his origins to the Lieutenant. It was during his work as a servant to a German nobleman that he began to experiment with the occult. He admits the dubious nature of his craft, admitting that he “did everything in [his] power to drain the purses of the weak and credulous” (142). The Necromancer starts to recount all of his deceptions and supposed sorceries, including the story of the fiancé and the village and the duel, which was staged. He admits his devious machinations shamefully: “[I] suffice to say, that a complete account of my frauds would swell many volumes…I had, for the space of six years, carried on my juggling tricks with so much secrecy, that few of my criminal deeds were known…I always suffered myself to be blinded by the two powerful charms of gold and false ambition” (151). The narrative then commences with the trial of the bandits, including the testimony of an innkeeper named Wolf who often led the criminals (“the captain of the robbers”) and who made a majority of the deceptions possible (190). After naming his accomplices and their locations, Wolf is eventually sentenced to life imprisonment in the Black Forest “where he will have ample scope to reflect on his life past” (196).

== Frame Narrative ==
The Necromancer is notable in that it is told by way of multiple nested frame narratives; either verbal or epistolary sequences by characters who tell their own stories to enhance realism. By the time of the novel's publication these sequences had been absorbed by the Gothic genre and had become signposts for contemporary readers confirming the work as fiction, or at least of suspect origin. This tradition gains its peak recognition within the Gothic novel in Mary Shelley's most famous work, Frankenstein.

The out-most frame of the story is told by a semi-omniscient narrator, who we learn at the end of book 1 is Hellfried looking back on his visit at Herman's home. Within this, we are presented with the first stories from Hellfried and Herman respectively, told from the viewpoint of each. Often, multiple smaller narratives are presented to the reader by a single narrator within his story, who offers these first-hand accounts as more qualified to explain details than he himself could. This results in a series of encapsulating events; where a story told by one character can contain multiple stories by others, who each in turn have another outside story to tell. The tales break down, then, as follows (with each name signifying a new narrator who refers to themself as an "I", and indentations representing the depth of narrative relative to the un-indented narrator above it):

=== Part 1 ===
Hellfried's written account

Hellfried's verbal account of his stay at the inn.
Herman's verbal account of his adventure at the castle.

=== Part 2 ===
Baron R—'s Letter to Herman

Lieutenant B—'s Letter to Baron R—

Austrian Lieutenant's Verbal account of Volkert's ability

Old Widow's Account of her deceased husband's seance
Baron T—'s Letter account of Volkert's summoning of him to the duel.

Lieutenant N—'s verbal account of his encounter with the phantom of the inn.
John the Servant's verbal account of his escape from the bandits
Volkert's verbal account revealing his illusions.

Helen's verbal account of her trouble with her desired suitor

Wolf's verbal account of becoming a robber

=== Part 3 ===
P—'s letter continuing Wolf's story in the third person as well as his sentencing.

== Editions ==
- 1794, London: William Lane (2 volumes)
- 1927, London: Robert Holden
- 1968, Folio Press
- 1989, Skoob Books ISBN 1-871438-20-9
- 2007, Valancourt Books ISBN 978-0-9792332-2-7
