= Barṣīṣā =

Concept in Islam

Barsisa, ("the man of priestly regalia", from Aramaic bar, "son", and ṣīṣa, "gold plate", referring specifically to the high priest's breastplate) in Islamic theology dating from the early 10th century, was an ascetic who succumbed to the Devil's temptations and denied God.

The fable passed into European literary culture after its publication under the title "History of Santon Barsisa" in the British periodical The Guardian in 1713. Its anonymous contributor writes that he found the story in a volume of "Turkish Tales" and, worried that its Islamic origin may cause offense, explains that "the moral to be drawn from it is entirely Christian". In this form the fable went on to inspire Matthew Gregory Lewis's 1796 Gothic novel The Monk.

== Story of Barṣīṣā ==
Barsisa was one of the most pious worshippers from the tribe of Israel during his time. Because he was known to be very pious, three brothers asked him to take care of their sister while they went to war, as they did not know any better person to trust and take care of her than him. At first, he refused their request and sought refuge in Allah. However, the brothers persisted in their efforts, and eventually, he agreed as long as she lived next door. So they left her in that house and went to fight in a war, and Barsisa would place food in front of her home and then leave and go back to his house and call out to her to get the food. As the days passed, Shaytan (The devil) attempted to convince him to do wrong. He kept telling him that he was not treating the woman kindly, that it was unacceptable to let a woman go out and get the food in the open where others may see her, and that he should deliver it to her. Barsisa rejected the ideas that kept coming to his head but eventually succumbed to Shaytan. Little by little, as the days went by, he got closer to her, first by delivering it directly, then going in, then getting other ideas like talking to her as she may be lonely; eventually, he ended up committing adultery with her, and she became pregnant. Shaytan tried to convince him now to kill the baby since the brothers may come back any moment, and they would question where the baby came from. Fearing their anger, he killed the baby; then afterwards, Shaytan convinced him to kill the mother because she may tell her brothers what happened. Eventually, the brothers came back, and he had lied to them and told them she got sick and died and had shown them a fake grave. The brothers prayed for her and accepted her death. However, the next day, they discussed how both of them had dreams of her being pregnant and murdered and saw the location of her actual grave, so they decided to go to the actual grave where they found the corpse of the mother and her baby. Afterwards, they returned and seized Barsisa and took him to the ruler; before his execution, Shaytan appeared to him in the form of a man and offered to save him if he performed prostration to him. Barsisa accepted and prostrated; Shaytan then left him on his own. and thus Barsisa died having committed the sins of zina (Adultery), murder, lying, betrayal of trust and shirk without any repentance, In Islamic theology, God will not forgive a person who dies in a state of shirk without repentance.

== See also ==
- Haya
- Zina

== Resources ==
- Encyclopædia Britannica (15th ed.). Encyclopædia Britannica, Inc. 2010.
- Story of Barsisa the worshipper as narrated in Ibn al-Jawzi's Talbees Iblees
- Quadri, Habeeb (6 January 2013). The war within our hearts (2nd ed.). Kube Pub. ISBN 9781847740564.
