= The Criminal of Lost Honour =

1786 short story by Friedrich Schiller

The Criminal of Lost Honour (Der Verbrecher aus verlorener Ehre) is a crime report by Friedrich Schiller, first published in 1786 under the title Verbrecher aus Infamie (Criminal of Infamy).

Partially based on the true crime cases perpetrated by Johann Friedrich Schwan (1729-1760), who was beheaded for his crimes in Swabia, Schiller's Christian Wolf is a poacher, murderer, and for a while leader of a local criminal gang. Wolf gets arrested multiple times for poaching. His incentive for poaching is to enable him to purchase presents for Johanne, whom he feels needs to get nice presents from him since she is significantly more attractive than he deserves. After his release from imprisonment and repeated failure to find employment, he resorts to shooting and killing the man who made multiple accusations against him named Robert. He immediately regrets the act, and attempts to escape Swabia for Prussia to serve as a soldier in the Royal Prussian Army. However, he is caught at the border-crossing and imprisoned.

Schiller describes Christian Wolf as very sensitive, a man with genuine feelings of honor who got left behind in life. Wolf feels the loss of honor most starkly while imprisoned for the third time as a poacher. Near the end of the report he intends to restore his honor by recasting himself from a criminal poacher to a soldier of honor.

The librarian, translator and author Hermann Kurz published a novel Der Sonnenwirt (1856), likewise based on Schwan's criminal life. Schiller's school teacher Jacob Friedrich von Abel told his pupils that his father had arrested Schwan, giving Schiller inspiration for his report.
