= Horrid Mysteries =

1796 novel by Carl Grosse

The Horrid Mysteries; A Story from the German of the Marquis of Grosse
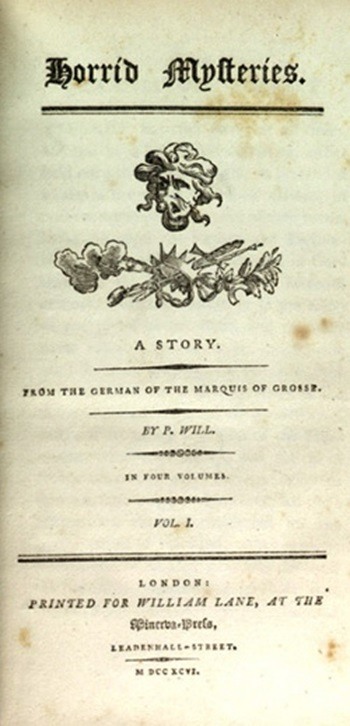
- First edition title page
- Author: Carl Friedrich August Grosse
- Original title: Der Genius, Aus den Papieren des Marquis C* von G**
- Translator: Peter Will
- Genre: Gothic fiction
- Publisher: Minerva Press
- Publication date: 1796
- Media type: Print (Hardback & Paperback)
- Pages: c.200 pp

The Horrid Mysteries, subtitled "A Story From the German Of The Marquis Of Grosse" is a translation by Peter Will of the German Gothic novel Der Genius by Carl Grosse. It was listed as one of the seven "horrid novels" by Jane Austen in her Northanger Abbey and also mentioned by Thomas Love Peacock in Nightmare Abbey. It was first published by the sensationalist Minerva Press in 1796. A later, two-volume edition published by Robert Holden and Co., Ltd. in 1927 includes a new introductory essay by Montague Summers. The books were bound in pictorial boards, and feature a period-style "advertisement" for Pears' Soap on the rear cover.

The hero of the tale, the Marquis of Grosse, finds himself embroiled in a secret revolutionary society which advocates murder and mayhem in pursuit of an early form of communism. He creates a rival society to combat them and finds himself hopelessly trapped between the two antagonistic forces. The book has been both praised and lambasted for its lurid portrayal of sex, violence and barbarism. H. P. Lovecraft, in his lengthy essay Supernatural Horror in Literature, dismissed it and others like it as "...the dreary plethora of trash like Marquis von Grosse's Horrid Mysteries..."

== Editions ==
- 1927, London: Robert Holden & Co Ltd, 2 volumes
- 1968, London: Folio Society
- 2016, Richmond, VA: Valancourt Books
