= List of fellows of the Royal Society A, B, C =

About 8,000 fellows have been elected to the Royal Society of London since its inception in 1660. Below is an incomplete list of people who are or were Fellow or Foreign Member of the Royal Society. The date of election to the fellowship follows the name. Dates in brackets relate to an award or event associated with the person. The Society maintains complete online lists of current fellows and of past and current Fellows. This list is complete up to and including 2019.

List of fellows and foreign members of the Royal Society
A, B, C	D, E, F	G, H, I	J, K, L	M, N, O	P, Q, R	S, T, U, V	W, X, Y, Z

== List of fellows ==
=== A ===
Name	Election date	Notes
Charles Abbot, 1st Baron Colchester	1793-02-14	15 October 1757 – 8 May 1829
John Farr Abbott	1793-06-20	1757 – 22 September 1794
Salim Abdool Karim	2019-04-16	29 July 1960 –
Louis Paul Abeille	1762-04-22	3 June 1719 – 28 July 1807
Clarke Abel	1820-03-11	c. 1780 – 24 November 1826
Frederick Augustus Abel	1860-06-07	18 July 1827 – 6 September 1902
Christopher Abell	2016-04-29	11 November 1957 – 11 October 2020
Michael Abercrombie	1958-03-20	15 August 1912 – 28 May 1979
John Abernethy	1796-04-14	4 April 1764 – 28 April 1831
Mohammed Ben Ali Abgali	1727-03-24	1726–1737
William de Wiveleslie Abney	1876-06-01	25 July 1843 – 3 December 1920
Edward Penley Abraham	1958-03-20	11 June 1913 – 9 May 1999
Samson Abramsky	2005-05-27	12 March 1953 –
Mark Achtman	2015-05-01	Bacterial geneticist
Henry Wentworth Dyke Acland	1847-01-21	24 August 1815 – 16 October 1900
Thomas Dyke Acland	1839-06-20	26 May 1809 – 29 May 1898
Gilbert Smithson Adair	1939-03-16	22 September 1896 – 22 June 1979
James Adair	1789-04-10	c. 1743 – 21 July 1798
John Adair	1689-11-30	? 1647 – 15 May 1718
Robert Alexander Shafto Adair, 1st Baron Waveney	1845-06-05	26 August 1811 – 15 February 1886
Neil Kensington Adam	1935-05-16	6 November 1891 – 19 July 1973
Robert Adam	1761-05-07	1729 – 3 March 1792
John George Adami	1905-05-11	13 January 1862 – 29 August 1926
Alfred Rodney Adams	1996-03-14	11 November 1939 –
Andrew Leith Adams	1872-06-06	22 March 1827 – 29 July 1882
Frank Dawson Adams	1907-05-02	18 September 1859 – 26 December 1942
Jerry McKee Adams	1992-03-12	17 June 1940 –
John Bertram Adams	1963-03-21	25 May 1920 – 4 March 1984
John Couch Adams	1849-06-07	6 June 1819 – 21 January 1892
John Frank Adams	1964-03-19	6 November 1930 – 7 January 1989
Paul Richard Adams	1991-03-14	
William Grylls Adams	1872-06-06	18 February 1836 – 10 April 1915
Michel Adanson	1761-01-22	8 April 1727 – 3 August 1806
Cyril Clifford Addison	1970-03-19	29 November 1913 – 1 April 1994
William Addison	1846-01-29	1803 – 26 September 1881
Swithin Adee	1745-12-06	c. 1704 – 12 August 1786 Physician, Surrey
Saul Adler	1957-03-21	18 May 1895 – 25 January 1966
Edgar Douglas Adrian, 1st Baron Adrian of Cambridge	1923-05-03	31 November 1889 – 4 August 1977
Richard Hume Adrian, 2nd Baron Adrian of Cambridge	1977-03-17	17 October 1927 – 4 April 1995
Gabriel Aeppli	2010-05-20	25 November 1956 –
Ian Affleck	2010-05-20	2 July 1952 –
Adam Afzelius	1798-04-19	1751–1837
Cassem Algiada Aga	1729-12-05	fl 1728–1738 Libyan diplomat
George James Welbore Agar-Ellis, 1st Baron Dover	1816-11-07	15 January 1797 – 10 July 1833
George Charles Agar	1832-06-09	2 August 1780 – 24 June 1856
Welbore Ellis Agar	1782-03-22	c. 1736 – 30 October 1805 Commissioner of the Customs
Wilfred Eade Agar	1921-05-12	28 April 1882 – 14 July 1951
Girish Saran Agarwal	2008-05-16	7 July 1946 –
Varinder Kumar Aggarwal	2012-04-19	1961 –
John Aggleton	2012-04-19	14 June 1955 –
William Aglionby	1668-11-07	c. 1642 – 28 November 1705 Diplomat
George Andre Agricola	1699-01-11	1673–1738
Cyriacus Ahlers	1728-03-09	fl 1727–1756 German Physician
Robert Anthony Ainsworth	2009-05-15	UK Scientist
George Biddell Airy	1836-01-21	28 July 1801 – 2 January 1892
James Edward Tierney Aitchison	1883-06-07	29 October 1835 – 30 September 1898 Scottish Surgeon & Botanist
Alexander Craig Aitken	1936-05-07	2 April 1895 – 3 November 1967
John Aitken	1889-06-06	19 September 1839 – 13 November 1919
Martin Jim Aitken	1984-03-17	11 March 1922 – 13 June 2017 UK Physicist (archeology)
William Aitken	1873-06-12	24 April 1825 – 25 June 1892 Scottish Surgeon
Michael Edwin Akam	2001-05-11	19 June 1952 – Zoologist
Mark Akenside	1753-02-08	10 November 1721 – 23 June 1770
Wallace Alan Akers	1952-03-20	10 September 1888 – 1 November 1954 Chemist & Industrialist
Muhammad Akhtar	1981-03-20	23 February 1933 – Biochemist, Punjab, Pakistan
Jim Al-Khalili	2018-05-09	20 September 1962 –
John Fortescue Aland, 1st Baron Fortescue of Credan	1712-03-20	8 March 1670 – 19 December 1746
Ali Alavi	2015-05-01	Theoretical Chemist
George Monck Albemarle, 1st Duke of Albemarle	1665-01-09	6 December 1608 – 3 January 1670
Albert, Prince Consort of Queen Victoria	1840-04-30	27 August 1819 – 14 December 1861 Royal
Giambattista Albertini	1760-12-11	1716 – 12 May 1788 Envoy Extraordinary from the King of the Two Sicilies
Wyndham John Albery	1986-03-21	5 April 1936 – 3 December 2013
Bernard Siegfried Albinus	1764-02-23	26 February 1697 – 9 September 1770
Alfred William Alcock	1901-06-06	24 June 1859 – 24 March 1933
Nathan Alcock	1751-01-25	September 1707 – 8 December 1779
Roger William Alder	2007-05-18	Organic Chemist
Robert Aldersey	1795-07-03	– 18 November 1802 Barrister
James Alderson	1841-06-17	31 December 1794 – 13 September 1882 English Surgeon (PRCS)
David John Aldous	1994-03-10	13 July 1952 –
Jean le Rond d'Alembert	1748-12-22	17 November 1717 – 29 October 1783
Dario Renato Alessi	2008-05-16	23 December 1967
Henry Alexander	1848-04-22	c. 1782 – January 1859 Oculist to Queen Victoria
Robert Alexander	1835-11-26	19 January 1795 – 21 February 1843
Robert McNeill Alexander	1987-03-17	7 July 1934– 21 March 2016 UK Zoologist
Alfred Ernest Albert, Duke of Edinburgh and Duke of Saxe-Coburg and Gotha	1882-03-16	7 August 1844 – 30 July 1900 Royal
Francesco Algarotti	1736-07-08	12 December 1712 – 24 May 1764
Archibald Alison	1792-11-15	1758 – 17 May 1839
Johann Nicholaus Sebastian Allamand	1747-01-22	19 September 1713 – 2 March 1787
Thomas Allan	1815-04-06	18 July 1777 – 12 September 1833
Thomas Clifford Allbutt	1880-06-03	21 July 1836 – 22 February 1925
Edgar Johnson Allen	1914-05-07	7 April 1866 – 7 December 1942
Edmond Allen	1727-05-12	? – 1763
Geoffrey Allen	1977-03-18	1928 –
Herbert Stanley Allen	1930-05-15	30 December 1873 – 27 April 1954
John Allen	1731-10-22	c. 1660 – 16 September 1741
John Frank Allen	1949-03-17	7 May 1908 – 22 April 2001
John Robert Laurence Allen	1979-03-15	25 October 1932 – UK Geologist
Norman Percy Allen	1956-03-15	5 June 1903 – 23 February 1972
Percival Allen	1973-03-15	15 March 1917 – 3 April 2008
Thomas Allen	1668-02-06	– 1684 Physician
William Allen	1807-11-19	29 August 1770 – 30 December 1843 Quaker scientist
William Allen	1841-11-18	1793 – 23 January 1864 Captain, RN
John Alleyn	1663-05-20	1 March 1621 – 26 June 1663 (Original) Barrister & MP
John Alleyne	1776-05-16	– 1777 Barrister
Thomas Edward Allibone	1948-03-18	11 November 1903 – 9 September 2003
Carlo Allioni	1758-04-06	1725–1804
William Allix	1753-01-25	c. 1689–1769
George James Allman	1854-06-01	1812 – 24 November 1898
George Johnston Allman	1884-06-12	28 September 1824 – 9 May 1904 Prof of Maths, Queens Coll, Galway
Arthur John Allmand	1929-05-02	7 January 1885 – 4 August 1951 Prof of Chemistry, Kings College
Jacques Eugene d'Allonville, Chevalier de Louville	1715-06-09	14 July 1671 – 10 September 1732
Robin Allshire	2011-05-19	19 May 1960 –
Theodore de Almeyda	1758-03-09	1722–1803
Michael Philip Alpers	2008-05-16	Australian scientist (kuru research)
Johann Wilhelm Alruz	1729-11-06	– 1755
John Alstroemer	1778-12-24	1742–1786
George John Althorp, 2nd Earl Spencer	1780-04-06	1 September 1758 – 10 November 1834
John Charles Althorp, 3rd Earl Spencer	1820-11-16	30 May 1782 – 1 October 1845
Joseph Ames	1743-12-15	23 January 1689 – 7 October 1759
Johann Amman	1731-03-18	1707–1741
Emmanuel Ciprian Amoroso	1957-03-21	16 September 1901 – 30 October 1982 Trinidad Physiologist
William Bradshaw Amos	2007-05-17	21 November 1945 – Molecular Biology, Cambridge
Claudius Amyand	1716-04-05	– 6 July 1740 British Royal Surgeon
Thomas Amyot	1824-01-22	7 January 1775 – 28 September 1850 Lawyer & Antiquary
John Proctor Anderdon	1811-05-23	c. 1761 – 30 November 1846 British Merchant
Brian David Outram Anderson	1989-03-16	15 January 1941 –
Donald Thomas Anderson	1977-03-17	29 December 1939 – Australian Zoologist
Ephraim Saul Anderson	1968-03-21	28 October 1911 – 14 March 2006
Harry Anderson	2013-05-02	12 January 1964 –
Jan Mary Anderson	1996-03-14	13 May 1932 – 28 August 2015
John Anderson	1879-06-12	4 October 1833 – 15 August 1900
John Anderson	1759-02-01	1726 – 13 January 1796
Hugh Kerr Anderson	1907-05-02	6 July 1865 – 2 November 1928 Master, Caius College
John Stuart Anderson	1953-03-19	9 January 1908 – 25 December 1990
Roy Malcolm Anderson	1986-03-20	12 April 1947 –
Ross J. Anderson	2009-05-15	15 September 1956 –
William Anderson	1891-06-04	5 January 1835 – 11 December 1898 Dir. of Ordnance
Antonio Freyre de Andrade	1749-05-04	– 1772
Edward Neville da Costa Andrade	1935-05-16	27 December 1887 – 6 June 1971
Andrew, Duke of York	2013-05-02	Royal Member
Edward Raymond Andrew	1984-03-15	27 June 1921 – 27 May 2001 UK Physicist (NMR)
James Andrew	1821-03-29	1774 – 13 June 1833 East India Company
Sydney Percy Smith Andrew	1976-03-18	16 May 1926 – 2 November 2011 UK Engineer
Christopher Howard Andrewes	1939-03-16	7 June 1896 – 31 December 1988
Frederick William Andrewes	1915-05-06	31 March 1859 – 24 February 1932 English Pathologist
Charles William Andrews	1906-05-03	30 October 1866 – 25 May 1924
Joseph Andrews	1727-03-09	c. 1691 – ? 22 April 1753 Paymaster to Forces
Thomas Andrews	1888-06-07	17 February 1847 – 19 June 1907
Thomas Andrews	1849-06-07	19 December 1813 – 26 November 1885
James Roger Prior Angel	1990-03-15	7 February 1941 –
Thomas Anguish	1776-04-24	
Bernt Anker	1782-11-07	1746–1805 Norwegian timber merchant
Carsten Anker	1804-03-01	1747–1824 Norwegian businessman
Anne Elizabeth Alice Louise, Princess Royal	1987-02-12	Royal Member
Arthur Annesley, 1st Earl of Anglesey	1668-04-16	10 July 1614 – 10 April 1686
Arthur Annesley, 1st Earl of Mountnorris	1800-12-18	7 August 1744 – 4 July 1816
Francis Annesley	1704-11-30	24 October 1663 – 7 April 1750 MP Preston & Westbury
George Annesley, 2nd Earl of Mountnorris	1796-11-24	January 1771 – 23 July 1844
James Annesley	1840-01-30	c.1780 – 15 December 1847 Surgeon
James Annesley, 2nd Earl of Anglesey	1663-01-07	1645 – 1 April 1690 Original fellow
Gleb Anrep	1928-05-10	
Charles Ansell	1834-04-10	8 December 1794 – 14 December 1861 Actuary
George Anson, Baron Anson of Soberton	1745-12-05	23 April 1697 – 6 June 1762
Thomas Anson	1730-05-14	c.1695 – 30 March 1773
David Thomas Ansted	1844-01-11	5 February 1814 – 13 May 1880
Janis Antonovics	1988-03-17	1942 –
Edmund Antrobus	1801-03-26	
James Apjohn	1853-06-02	1 September 1796 – 2 June 1886
Edward Victor Appleton	1927-05-12	6 September 1892 – 21 April 1965
John George Appold	1853-06-02	14 April 1800 – 31 August 1865
Francesco d'Aquino	1783-06-05	see Francesco d'Aquino, Prince of Caramanico
Nicolo Alerbo d'Aragona	1723-03-21	
Agnes Arber	1946-03-21	23 February 1879 – 22 March 1960
John Arbuthnot	1704-11-30	29 April 1667 – 27 February 1735
John Arbuthnot	1770-11-22	c.1729 – 27 December 1797
William Archer	1875-06-03	6 May 1830 (?1827) – 14 August 1897
Charles Dickson Archibald	1840-11-26	c. 1802 – 12 September 1868
Charles George Arden, Baron Arden	1786-01-19	1 October 1756 – 5 July 1840
Richard Pepper Arden, 1st Baron Alvanley	1788-11-13	20 May 1744 – 19 March 1804
Charles Frederick Arden-Close	1919-05-15}	10 August 1865 – 19 December 1952
James Arderne	1668-06-11	c. 1636 – c. September 1691
William Arderon	1745-12-12	1703 – 25 November 1767
Robert Areskin	1703-11-30	c. 1674 – 15 January 1719
Antoine Joseph Dezallier d'Argenville	1750-03-22	4 July 1680 – 29 November 1765
John Argyris	1986-03-20	19 August 1916 – 2 April 2004
William Joscelyn Arkell	1947-03-20	9 June 1904 – 18 April 1958
Joseph Arthur Arkwright	1926-05-06	22 March 1864 – 22 November 1944
Steven Peter Armes	2014-04-30	1962 –
Judith Armitage	2013-05-02	21 February 1951 –
Alexander Armstrong	1873-06-12	1818 – 4 July 1899
Edward Frankland Armstrong	1920-05-13	5 September 1878 – 14 December 1945 UK industrial chemist
Fraser Andrew Armstrong	2008-05-16	1951 – UK Chemist
Henry Edward Armstrong	1876-06-01	6 May 1848 – 13 July 1937
John Armstrong	1723-05-02	31 March 1674 – 25 April 1742
Robert Young Armstrong	1892-06-02	19 September 1839 – 1 November 1894
William George Armstrong, Baron Armstrong of Cragside	1846-05-07	26 November 1810 – 27 December 1900
Ulrich Wolfgang Arndt	1982-03-18	23 April 1924 — 24 March 2006
James Henry Arnold	1806-03-20	c. 1759 – 15 January 1836
John Oliver Arnold	1912-05-02	29 December 1858 – 27 March 1930
Polly Arnold	2018-05-09	24 July 1972 –
James Moncrieff Arnott	1843-05-25	15 March 1794 – 27 May 1885 English Surgeon
Neil Arnott	1838-01-25	15 May 1788 – 2 March 1874
Struther Arnott	1985-03-21	25 September 1934 – 20 April 2013
Cyril Arthington	1701-12-31	c. 1666–1720 Yorkshire Gentleman
Arthur Frederick Patrick Albert, Prince of Great Britain and Ireland	1914-03-26	13 January 1883 – 12 September 1938 Royal
Arthur William Patrick Albert, Duke of Connaught and Strathearn	1906-11-08	1 May 1850 – 16 January 1942 Royal
James Greig Arthur	1992-03-12	18 May 1944 –
Richard Arundel	1740-11-20	– 20 December 1757 UK MP & Politician
Peter Ascanius	1755-12-11	fl 1755
Edward Ash	1801-06-18	c. 1764 – 29 March 1829
John Ash	1787-11-08	c. 1723 – 18 June 1798
Eric Albert Ash	1977-03-17	31 January 1928 – UK Physicist, London
Michael Ashburner	1990-03-15	23 May 1942 –
Eric Ashby, Baron Ashby of Brandon, Suffolk	1963-03-21	24 August 1904 – 22 October 1992
Michael Farries Ashby	1979-03-15	20 November 1935 –
Shukbrugh Ashby	1756-03-18	6 October 1724 – 28 January 1792 MP for Leicester
Frances Mary Ashcroft	1999-05-13	15 February 1952 –
St. George Ashe	1686-02-03	? 1658 – 27 February 1718
William Windham Ashe	1749-01-19	–1749 born William Windham
Michael Norman Royston Ashfold	2009-05-15	Physical Chemist, Bristol
Elias Ashmole	1661-01-02	23 May 1617 – 18 May 1692 Original
Jonathan Felix Ashmore	1996-03-14	1948 –
Norman Henry Ashton	1971-03-18	11 September 1913 – 4 January 2000
Alan Ashworth	2008-05-16	1960 –
James Hartley Ashworth	1917-05-03	2 May 1874 – 4 February 1936
Anthony Askew	1750-02-01	1722 – 27 February 1772
Brigitte Alice Askonas	1973-03-15	1 April 1923 – 9 January 2013
H. H. Asquith	1908-11-05	12 September 1852 – 15 February 1928 Statute 12
Stephanus Evodius Assemanni	1738-01-19	1707–1782
Richard Assheton	1914-05-07	23 December 1863 – 24 October 1915 Morphologist and Embryologist
Alan Astbury	1993-03-11	27 November 1934 – 21 July 2014
William Thomas Astbury	1940-03-14	26 February 1898 – 4 June 1961
Edward Astle	1808-06-02	– 1816
Thomas Astle	1766-03-20	22 December 1735 – 1 December 1803
Francis Aston	1678-11-30	1644 – July 1715
Francis William Aston	1921-05-12	1 September 1877 – 20 November 1945
David Francis Atcherley	1841-02-04	1783–1845
Michael Francis Atiyah	1962-03-15	22 April 1929 – 11 January 2019; RS President 1990–1995)
William Ringrose Gelston Atkins	1925-05-07	4 September 1884 – 4 April 1959
Colin Atkinson	1998-05-14	Prof of Maths, Imperial College
Robert Atkyns	1664-11-09	1647 – 29 November 1711
David Frederick Attenborough	1983-06-30	8 May 1926 – Statute
John Attfield	1880-06-03	28 August 1835 – 18 March 1911
Paul Attfield	2014-04-30	27 July 1962 –
Clement Richard Attlee, 1st Earl Attlee	1947-05-15	3 January 1883 – 8 October 1967
David Ian Attwell	2001-05-10	1953 –
Joseph Atwell	1729-03-20	c. 1696 – August 1768
George Atwood	1776-06-13	1746–1807
Abraham D'Aubant	1791-05-05	fl 1791
Alexander Aubert	1772-01-09	11 May 1730 – 19 October 1805
John Aubrey	1663-01-07	12 March 1626 – 7 June 1697 Original
John James Audubon	1830-03-18	26 April 1785 – 27 January 1851
Charlotte Auerbach	1957-03-21	14 May 1899 – 17 March 1994
Augustus Frederick, Duke of Sussex	1828-05-22	27 January 1773 – 21 April 1843 Royal
John Auldjo	1840-05-07	1805 – 6 May 1886
Louis D'Aumont de Rochebaron	1713-05-21	19 July 1667 – 6 April 1723
James Peter Auriol	1808-01-14	fl 1808
George Aust	1797-03-09	– c. 1829
John Austen	1660-12-12	1613–1669 (Original member), Author
Philip D'Auvergne, Duc de Bouillon	1786-05-11	November 1754 – 18 September 1816
Adrien Auzout	1666-05-23	January 1622 – 23 May 1691
Giuseppe Averani	1712-10-23	20 March 1662 – ? 24 August 1738
William Ian Axford	1986-03-20	2 January 1933 – 13 March 2010 Max-Planck-Institut
Joseph Ayloffe	1731-05-27	1709 – 19 April 1781
Charles Nicholas Ayres	1708-11-30	fl 1708
Thomas Ayres	1707-12-01	– 1715 Physician
William Ayrton	1837-06-01	1777 – 8 March 1858
William Edward Ayrton	1881-06-02	14 September 1847 – 8 November 1908
Marco Antonio de Azevado Coutinho	1736-05-06	1688–1750

=== B ===
Name	Election date	Notes
Charles Babbage	1816-03-14	26 December 1791 – 18 October 1871
Henry Baber	1816-05-23	1 January 1775 – 28 March 1869
Benjamin Guy Babington	1828-03-20	1794 – 8 April 1866
Cardale Babington	1851-06-05	23 November 1808 – 22 July 1895
William Babington	1805-05-30	21 May 1756 – 29 April 1833
Boris Babkin	1950-03-16	17 January 1877 – 2 May 1950
George Back	1847-01-07	6 November 1796 – 23 June 1878
Francis Thomas Bacon	1973-03-15	21 December 1904 – 24 May 1992
John Bacon	1751-01-24	1709 – 30 June 1752
Thomas Bacon	1722-03-15	? 1664 – 23 August 1736 MP born Thomas Sclater
Vincent Bacon	1732-11-09	– 6 April 1739
Alan Baddeley	1993-03-11	23 March 1934 – Professor of Psychology, York
James Baddiley	1961-03-16	15 May 1918 – 17 November 2008
Charles Badham	1818-03-12	17 April 1780 – 10 November 1845
Jas Pal Badyal	2016-04-29	March 1964 –
Nicholas Bagenall	1664-11-23	9 August 1629 – 1712
Giorgio Baglivi	1698-07-06	8 September 1668 – 17 June 1707
John Bagnall	1774-12-08	fl 1774
Ralph Bagnold	1944-03-16	3 April 1896 – 28 May 1990
Kenneth Bagshawe	1989-03-16	17 August 1925 – 27 December 2022
Arthur Bailey	1683-11-30	– 1712 Merchant
Kenneth Bailey	1953-03-19	18 August 1909 – 22 May 1963 Biochemist, Trinity College, Cambridge
Richard William Bailey	1949-03-17	6 January 1885 – 4 September 1957
Edward Battersby Bailey	1930-05-15	1 July 1881 – 19 March 1965
David Baillie	1836-02-11	– 17 June 1861
John Baillie (of Leys)	1817-06-05	1772 – 20 April 1833
Matthew Baillie	1790-06-03	27 October 1761 – 23 September 1823
Chevalier de Baillou	1749-11-02	fl 1749
Edward Hodges Baily	1842-01-13	1788 – 22 May 1867
Francis Baily	1821-02-22	28 April 1774 – 30 August 1844
Francis Arthur Bainbridge	1919-05-15	29 July 1874 – 21 October 1921
Thomas Baines	1663-05-20	c. 1622 – 5 September 1680 Original, Physician
Andrew Baird	1828-12-11	1757 – 17 July 1843
Andrew Wilson Baird	1885-06-04	26 April 1842 – 2 April 1908
William Baird	1867-06-06	1803 – 27 January 1872
Leonard Bairstow	1917-05-03	25 June 1880 – 8 September 1963
Alan Baker	1973-03-15	19 August 1939 – 4 February 2018
Benjamin Baker	1890-06-05	31 March 1840 – 19 May 1907
Frederick Francis Baker	1811-03-14	13 May 1772 – 1 October 1830
George Baker	1762-02-04	1 January 1722 – 15 June 1809
Henry Baker	1741-03-12	8 May 1698 – 25 November 1774
H. F. Baker	1898-06-09	3 July 1866 – 17 March 1956
Herbert Brereton Baker	1902-06-05	25 June 1862 – 27 April 1935
John Baker	1810-12-13	1 January 1736 – 16 May 1818
John Baker	1958-03-20	23 October 1900 – 8 June 1984
John Baker, Baron Baker	1956-03-15	19 March 1901 – 9 September 1985
John Gilbert Baker	1878-06-06	13 January 1834 – 16 August 1920
John Wynn Baker	1771-02-17	– 24 August 1775
Peter Frederick Baker	1976-03-18	11 March 1939 – 10 March 1987
Raymond Baker	1994-03-10	1 November 1936 – Biotechnologist BBSRC
Samuel Baker	1869-06-03	8 June 1821 – 30 December 1893
Thomas Baker	1684-11-19	1625 – 5 June 1690 Clergyman & Mathematician
Wilson Baker	1946-03-21	24 January 1900 – 3 June 2002
Shankar Balasubramanian	2012-04-19	30 September 1966 –
Steven Balbus	2016-04-29	23 November 1953 –
Giovanni Antonio, Count Baldini	1713-01-29	? 8 July 1654 – ? 23 January 1725
Christopher Adolphus Baldwin	1677-02-08	1632–1682
John Evan Baldwin	1991-03-14	6 December 1931 – 7 December 2010
Roger Baldwin	1760-12-18	c. 1717 – 28 August 1801 Clergyman
Jack Edward Baldwin	1978-03-16	8 August 1938 – 4 January 2020
Charles Bale	1719-11-30	1 January 1692 – 17 September 1730
Arthur James Balfour, 1st Earl of Balfour	1888-01-12	25 July 1848 – 19 March 1930
Francis Maitland Balfour	1878-06-06	10 November 1851 – 18 July 1882
Henry Balfour	1924-05-15	11 April 1863 – 9 February 1939
John Hutton Balfour	1856-06-05	15 September 1808 – 11 February 1884
Isaac Bayley Balfour	1884-06-12	31 March 1853 – 30 November 1922
Thomas Graham Balfour	1858-06-03	18 March 1813 – 17 January 1891
John Ball	1868-06-04	20 August 1818 – 21 October 1889
Keith Ball	2013-05-02	26 December 1960 –
Peter Ball	1663-05-20	c. 1638 – July 1675 Original, Physician
John Macleod Ball	1989-03-16	19 May 1948 –
Robert Stawell Ball	1873-06-12	1 July 1840 – 25 November 1913
Valentine Ball	1882-06-08	14 July 1843 – 15 June 1895
Edward Ballard	1889-06-06	15 April 1820 – 19 January 1897
Robert Balle	1708-11-30	– 1733
William Balle	1660-11-28	c. 1627 – October 1690 Founder
William Lawrence Balls	1923-05-03	3 September 1882 – 18 July 1960
Allan Balmain	2015-05-01	Cancer Geneticist
Edward Balme	1801-03-12	– 31 January 1823
Andrew Balmford	2011	
Edward Charles Cyril Baly	1909-05-06	10 February 1871 – 3 January 1948
William Baly	1847-04-15	1814 – 28 January 1861
John Bamber	1718-12-11	c. 1667 – 7 November 1753 Surgeon
Clement Henry Bamford	1964-03-19	10 October 1912 – 7 November 1999
Edward Bancroft	1773-05-20	9 January 1744 – 8 September 1821
Jillian Banfield	2018-05-09	18 August 1959 –
Alec Douglas Bangham	1977-03-17	10 November 1921 – 9 March 2010 Biophysicist
Charles Bangham	2019-04-16	
Robert Bankes	1736-11-11	– November 1746
William John Bankes	1822-03-28	11 December 1786 – 15 April 1855
John Banks	1668-12-10	August 1627 – 19 October 1699
Joseph Banks	1730-12-10	21 June 1695 – 31 March 1741 MP & High Sheriff
Joseph Banks	1766-05-01	14 February 1744 – 19 June 1820
Frederick Grant Banting	1935-05-16	15 November 1891 – 21 February 1941
Horace Newton Barber	1963-03-21	26 May 1914 – 17 April 1971
James Barber	2005-05-26	16 July 1940 – 5 January 2020
Michael Barber	1985-03-21	3 November 1934 – 8 May 1991 Chemist
Johannes Mendez Saquet Barboza	1750-05-10	– 1773
Arthur Kett Barclay	1852-06-03	20 June 1806 – 20 November 1869
James Robertson Barclay	1790-11-11	– ? 1827
Yves-Alain Barde	2017-05-05	
Henry Barcroft	1953-03-19	18 October 1904 – 10 January 1998
Joseph Barcroft	1910-05-05	26 July 1872 – 21 March 1947
David Barford	2006-05-18	
George Barger	1919-05-15	4 April 1878 – 6 January 1939
Henry Barham	1717-11-14	c. 1670 – May 1726
Evelyn Baring, 1st Earl of Cromer	1911-11-23	26 February 1841 – 29 January 1917
Francis Thornhill Baring, Baron Northbrook	1849-02-22	20 April 1796 – 6 September 1866
Thomas Baring	1841-06-10	12 June 1772 – 3 April 1848
Thomas Baring	1860-06-07	7 September 1799 – 18 November 1873
Thomas George Baring, 1st Earl of Northbrook	1880-01-08	22 January 1826 – 15 November 1904
William Bingham Baring, 2nd Baron Ashburton	1854-04-27	June 1799 – 23 March 1864
David James Purslove Barker	1998-05-14	29 June 1938 – 27 August 2013 Epidemiologist
George Barker	1839-06-06	1776 – 6 December 1845
John Barker	1953-03-19	24 April 1901 – 30 December 1970 Plant physiologist
John Adair Barker	1981-03-19	24 March 1925 – 27 October 1995
Robert Barker	1732-03-09	– 9 September 1745 Physician
Robert Barker	1775-03-16	? 1729 – 14 September 1789 Army officer & MP
Charles Glover Barkla	1912-05-02	7 June 1877 – 23 October 1944
Sir Henry Barkly	1864-06-02	25 February 1815 – 20 October 1898
Harold Everard Monteagle Barlow	1961-03-16	15 November 1899 – 20 April 1989
Horace Basil Barlow	1969-03-20	8 December 1921 – 5 July 2020
John Barlow	1834-12-18	c. 1799 – 8 July 1869
Martin Thomas Barlow	2005-05-26	16 June 1953 –
Peter Barlow	1823-05-29	October 1776 – 1 March 1862 Mathematician
Peter William Barlow	1845-11-20	2 February 1809 – 19 May 1885 Engineer
Robert Barlow	1819-01-21	25 December 1757 – 11 May 1843 Admiral
Thomas Barlow	1909-05-06	4 September 1845 – 15 January 1945 Physician
William Barlow	1908-05-07	8 August 1845 – 28 February 1934
William Henry Barlow	1850-06-06	10 May 1812 – 12 November 1902
Edward Barnard	1828-06-05	fl 1828 Horticulture Society
Eric Albert Barnard	1981-03-19	2 July 1927 – 23 May 2018
Joseph Edwin Barnard	1924-05-15	7 December 1870 – 25 October 1949
Frederick Augusta Barnard	1790-05-13	c. 1743 – 27 January 1830
Thomas Barnard	1783-05-29	c. 1728 – 7 June 1806
Ernest William Barnes	1909-05-06	1 April 1874 – 29 November 1953
Howard Turner Barnes	1911-05-04	21 July 1873 – 4 October 1950
Joshua Barnes	1710-11-08	10 January 1654 – 3 August 1712
Peter John Barnes	2007-05-17	29 October 1946 –
Stephen Mark Barnett	2006-05-18	
Matthias Barnewall	1765-06-27	– 1767
Charles Frederick Barnwell	1809-03-09	c. 1781 – 22 March 1849
Frederick Henry Turnor Barnwell	1818-11-12	c. 1770 – 24 October 1843
John Baron	1823-02-13	24 May 1786 – 2 October 1851 Physician
Archibald Barr	1923-05-03	18 November 1855 – 5 August 1931
Murray Llewellyn Barr	1972-03-16	20 June 1908 – 4 May 1995
Richard Maling Barrer	1956-03-15	16 June 1910 – 12 September 1996
Anthony Gerard Martin Barrett	1999-05-13	2 March 1952 –
Richard Barrett	1713-06-11	fl 1713
Spencer Charles Hilton Barrett	2004-05-27	7 June 1948 –
William Fletcher Barrett	1899-06-01	11 February 1844 – 26 May 1925
Joseph Barretto	1818-05-28	– 1824
Daines Barrington	1767-06-04	1727 – 14 March 1800
Ernest James William Barrington	1967-03-16	18 February 1909 – 15 December 1985
Thomas Barrington	1669-11-18	c. 1648 –
Laurence David Barron	2005-05-26	12 February 1944 –
Isaac Barrow	1662-09-17	October 1630 – 4 May 1677 Original
John Barrow	1805-07-04	19 June 1764 – 23 November 1848
John Barrow	1844-12-12	28 June 1808 – 9 December 1898 Archivist
John David Barrow	2003-05-15	29 November 1952 – 26 September 2020
William Barrowby	1721-11-02	1682 – 30 December 1751
Alexander Barry	1832-02-02	– 7 October 1832 Chemist
Charles Barry	1849-06-07	23 May 1795 – 12 May 1860
David Barry	1832-04-05	12 March 1780 – 4 November 1836 Physician
Edward Barry	1732-02-03	1698 – 29 March 1776
Martin Barry	1840-02-13	28 March 1802 – 27 April 1855
Jean Jacques Barthelemy	1755-06-12	20 January 1716 – 30 April 1795
Frederic Charles Bartlett	1932-05-05	20 October 1886 – 30 September 1969
Maurice Stevenson Bartlett	1961-03-16	18 June 1910 – 8 January 2002
Neil Bartlett	1973-03-15	15 September 1932 – 5 August 2008
Philip Nigel Bartlett	2012-05-19	
Derek Harold Richard Barton	1954-03-18	8 September 1918 – 16 March 1998
Edwin Henry Barton	1916-05-11	23 October 1858 – 23 September 1925
Nicholas Hamilton Barton	1994-03-10	30 August 1955 –
Philip Barton	1757-11-24	c. 1695 – 13 July 1765 Clergyman
Allan Irwin Basbaum	2006-05-18	
George Basevi	1843-05-11	1794 – 16 October 1845
Zbigniew Stanislaw Basinski	1980-03-20	28 April 1928 – 12 August 1999
Jacques Basnage de Beauval	1697-11-30	8 August 1653 – ? 22 December 1722
Jean Baptiste Bassand	1732-03-23	24 November 1680 – 30 November 1742
Alfred Barnard Basset	1889-06-06	25 July 1854 – 5 December 1930
Francis Basset, Baron de Dunstanville of Tehidy and Baron Basset of Stratton	1829-04-09	10 August 1757 – 5 February 1835
Job Baster	1738-06-01	2 April 1709 – 6 March 1775
Henry Charlton Bastian	1868-06-04	26 April 1837 – 17 November 1915
George Keith Batchelor	1957-03-21	8 March 1920 – 30 March 2000
Charles Spence Bate	1861-06-06	16 March 1819 – 29 July 1889
Christopher Michael Bate	1997-05-15	21 December 1943 –
George Bate	1660-12-12	1608 – 19 April 1669 Original
Harry Bateman	1928-05-10	29 May 1882 – 21 January 1946
James Bateman	1838-02-08	18 July 1811 – 27 November 1897
John Frederic La Trobe Bateman	1860-06-07	30 May 1810 – 10 June 1889
Leslie Clifford Bateman	1968-03-21	21 March 1915 – 12 October 2005
William Bateman, Viscount Bateman	1733-02-22	c. 1694 – December 1744
David Robert Bates	1955-03-17	18 November 1916 – 5 January 1994
Gillian Patricia Bates	2007-05-17	19 May 1956 –
Henry Walter Bates	1881-06-02	9 February 1825 – 16 February 1892
Leslie Fleetwood Bates	1950-03-16	7 March 1897 – 20 January 1978
Paul Bates	2021	
Thomas Bates	1718-12-11	– c. 1760 Surgeon
Paul Patrick Gordon Bateson	1983-03-17	31 March 1938 – 1 August 2017
William Bateson	1894-06-07	8 August 1861 – 8 February 1926
Francis Arthur Bather	1909-05-06	18 February 1863 – 20 March 1934
Benjamin Bathurst	1731-12-09	– 5 November 1767
Ralph Bathurst	1663-08-19	1620–1704
John Thomas Batt	1742-04-08	– 26 August 1762
Richard William Battarbee	2006-05-18	
Joseph Hallett Batten	1816-03-14	25 August 1778 – 11 October 1838
Alan Rushton Battersby	1966-03-17	4 March 1925 – 10 February 2018
William Battie	1742-01-07	1704 – 13 June 1776
William Battine	1797-06-01	25 January 1765 – 5 September 1836
John Michael Batty	2009-05-15	11 January 1945 –
Robert Batty	1822-02-28	1789 – 20 November 1848
Francis Bauer	1821-02-08	4 October 1758 – 11 December 1840
David Charles Baulcombe	2001-05-10	7 April 1952 –
Jeremy John Baumberg	2010-05-20	14 March 1967 –
Kamal Bawa	2015-05-01	7 April 1939 – Biologist
Frederick Charles Bawden	1949-03-17	18 August 1908 – 8 February 1972
Cecil Edwin Henry Bawn	1952-03-20	6 November 1908 – 19 September 2003
Joseph Baxendell	1884-06-12	19 April 1815 – 7 October 1887
Rodney James Baxter	1982-03-18	8 February 1940 – 20 July 2025
Ottavio Antonio Bayardi	1755-04-24	c. 1690 – c. 1765
Thomas Bayes	1742-11-04	1701 – 7 April 1761
David Bayford	1770-04-26	c. 1739 – 16 April 1790
William Frederick Baylay	1828-02-21	– c. 1845
Hagan Bayley	2011-05-19	13 February 1951 –
John Bayley	1823-11-20	– 25 March 1869 Antiquary
Thomas Butterworth Bayley	1773-02-18	20 June 1744 – 24 June 1802
William Maddock Bayliss	1903-06-11	2 May 1860 – 27 August 1924
Denis Baylor	2003-05-15	8 February 1940 – 16 March 2022
Polina Bayvel	2016-04-29	14 April 1966 –
David Beach	1996-03-14	Microbiologist St Barts
Evelyn Martin Lansdowne Beale	1979-03-15	8 September 1928 – 23 December 1985
Geoffrey Herbert Beale	1959-03-19	11 June 1913 – 16 October 2009
John Beale	1663-01-21	c. 1613 – c. 1683 Clergyman, Scientific writer
John Beale	1721-11-02	– 20 June 1724 Freemason
Lionel Smith Beale	1857-06-11	6 February 1828 – 28 March 1906
Carlyle Smith Beals	1951-03-15	29 June 1899 – 2 July 1979
James William Longman Beament	1964-03-19	17 November 1921 – 10 March 2005
North Ludlow Beamish	1827-11-15	31 December 1797 – 27 April 1872
Richard Beamish	1836-03-24	16 July 1798 – 20 November 1873 Civil Engineer
Richard Beard	1726-05-26	? 1688 – 8 July 1734 Physician
William Beatty	1818-04-30	– 25 March 1842
Charles Beauclerk, 1st Duke of St Albans	1722-11-01	8 May 1670 – 10 May 1726
Lord Amelius Beauclerk	1809-12-07	1771 – 10 December 1846
Topham Beauclerk	1770-03-08	December 1739 – 11 March 1780
H. Berenger de Beaufain	1730-04-23	– 1767
Louis de Beaufort	1746-10-23	6 October 1703 – 11 August 1795
Francis Beaufort	1814-06-30	1774 – 17 December 1857
Henry Beaufoy	1782-02-21	– 17 May 1795
Henry Benjamin Hanbury Beaufoy	1815-12-14	1786 – 12 July 1851
Mark Beaufoy	1790-02-18	1764 – 4 May 1827
Edward Blackett Beaumont	1835-06-04	1802 – 7 June 1878
Jean-Baptiste-Jacques Elie de Beaumont	1765-04-25	October 1732 – 10 January 1786
John Beaumont	1685-05-13	– ? March 1731
Richard Beaumont	1684-11-19	c. 1654 – 1 March 1692
Osmond Beauvoir	1785-06-09	– 1 July 1789
Giacomo Bartolommeo Beccari	1728-06-27	25 July 1682 – ? 19 January 1766
Giovanni Battista Beccaria	1755-05-29	? 2 October 1716 – 27 May 1781
Henry Thomas de la Beche	1819-12-23	11 February 1796 – 13 April 1855
Thomas Snow Beck	1851-06-05	1814 – 6 January 1877
Axel Dieter Becke	2006-05-18	10 June 1953 –
Balthasar Becker	1698-07-06	20 March 1634 – 11 June 1698
John Beckett	1816-03-14	17 May 1775 – 31 May 1847
William Beckett	1718-12-11	1684 – 25 November 1738 Surgeon
Samuel Husbands Beckles	1859-06-09	1814 – 4 September 1890
Athelstan Laurence Johnson Beckwith	1988-03-17	20 February 1930 – 15 May 2010 Canberra
Frank Evers Beddard	1892-06-02	19 June 1858 – 14 July 1925
John Rex Beddington	2001-05-10	13 October 1945 –
Rosa Susan Penelope Beddington	1999-05-13	23 March 1956 – 18 May 2001
John Beddoe	1873-06-12	21 September 1826 – 19 July 1911
William Bedford	1745-05-30	– 10 July 1747 Physician
Samuel Phillips Bedson	1935-05-16	1 December 1886 – 11 May 1969 Virologist
Frederick William Beechey	1824-12-23	18 February 1796 – 29 November 1856
Gavin Rylands De Beer	1940-03-14	1 November 1899 – 21 June 1972
David John Beerling	2014-04-30	21 June 1965 –
Albert William Beetham	1835-02-05	20 August 1802 – 11 March 1895
William Beetham	1828-01-10	– 1839
Jean Duthie Beggs	1998-05-14	16 April 1950 –
Henry Beighton	1720-11-03	– October 1743
George Thomas Beilby	1906-05-03	17 November 1850 – 1 August 1924
Otto John Beit	1924-11-06	8 December 1865 – 7 December 1930 Statute
John Belchier	1732-11-23	1706 – 6 February 1785
Bernard Forest de Belidor	1726-11-03	1693 – 8 September 1761
Matthias Belius	1738-06-01	1684–1749 aka Matthias Bel
Susan Jocelyn Bell Burnell	2003-05-15	15 July 1943 –
Charles Bell	1826-11-16	November 1774 – 28 April 1842
George Bell	1750-01-25	– 4 June 1758 Surgeon
George Douglas Hutton Bell	1965-03-18	18 October 1905 – 27 June 1993
Graham Bell	2016-04-29	3 March 1949 –
Isaac Lowthian Bell	1874-06-04	16 February 1816 – 20 December 1904
James Bell	1884-06-12	1824 – 31 March 1908 Chemist
John Bell	1824-12-16	23 October 1764 – 6 February 1836
John Irving Bell	2008-05-16	1 July 1952 –
John Stewart Bell	1972-03-16	28 July 1928 – 1 October 1990
Ronald Percy Bell	1944-03-16	24 November 1907 – 9 January 1996
Robert Bell	1897-06-03	3 June 1841 – 18 June 1917
Robert Edward Bell	1965-03-18	29 November 1918 – 1 April 1992
Thomas Bell	1828-01-10	11 October 1792 – 13 March 1880
Tony Bell	2017-05-05	
James William Bellamy	1834-12-18	15 November 1788 – 11 March 1874
Fettiplace Bellers	1711-11-30	23 August 1687 – ? 1752
John Bellers	1719-02-05	c. 1654 – 8 February 1725
Jacques Nicolas Bellin	1753-02-22	1703 – 21 March 1772
Bernardo de Belluga	1780-01-20	fl 1780
Richard Belward	1790-02-11	c. 1746 – 16 May 1803
John Van de Bemde	1678-11-30	c. 1655 – c. 1726
Tommaso Del Bene	1695-11-30	9 November 1652 – 2 December 1739
Guy Dunstan Bengough	1938-03-17	12 February 1876 – 20 January 1945
William Blaxland Benham	1907-05-02	29 March 1860 – 21 August 1950
Thomas Brooke Benjamin	1966-03-17	15 April 1929 – 16 August 1995
Thomas Archibald Bennet-Clark	1950-03-16	13 January 1903 – 24 November 1975
Abraham Bennet	1789-03-19	? December 1749 – May 1799
Henry Grey Bennet	1812-03-05	2 December 1777 – 29 May 1836
Richard Henry Alexander Bennet	1767-12-10	11 May 1743 – 14 March 1814
Geoffrey Thomas Bennett	1914-05-07	30 June 1868 – 11 October 1943
George Macdonald Bennett	1947-03-20	25 October 1892 – 9 February 1959
John Joseph Bennett	1841-12-16	8 January 1801 – 29 February 1876
Martin Arthur Bennett	1995-03-09	
James Risdon Bennett	1875-06-03	29 September 1809 – 14 December 1891 Physician
Noel Benson	1941-03-20	26 December 1885 – 20 August 1957
George Bentham	1862-06-05	22 September 1800 – 10 September 1884
John Albert Bentinck	1765-06-20	29 December 1737 – 23 September 1775
William Bentinck	1787-05-17	18 June 1764 – 21 February 1813
William Bentinck, 1st Count Bentinck	1731-05-27	1704 – 13 October 1774
William Henry Cavendish Bentinck, 3rd Duke of Portland	1766-06-05	1738 – 30 October 1809
William Bentinck, 2nd Duke of Portland	1739-12-06	1 March 1708 – 1 May 1762
Richard Bentley	1695-11-30	27 January 1662 – 14 July 1742
Michael Benton	2014-04-30	8 April 1956 –
Valerie Beral	2006-05-18	28 July 1946 –
Alexander James Beresford Beresford-Hope	1880-06-17	25 January 1820 – 20 October 1887
Franz Bergel	1959-03-19	14 February 1900 – 1 January 1987
Fraser John Bergersen	1981-03-19	26 May 1929 – 3 October 2011
Sidney van den Bergh	1988-03-17	20 May 1929 –
Peter Jonas Bergius	1770-05-31	6 July 1730 – 10 July 1790
Torbern Olof Bergman	1765-04-25	9 March 1735 – 8 July 1784
Theodor de Beringhen	1667-10-24	1644 –
Charles Berkeley, 2nd Earl of Berkeley	1667-11-21	8 April 1649 – 24 September 1710
George Berkeley, 1st Earl of Berkeley and Viscount Dursley	1663-05-20	1628–1698 Original
Maurice Berkeley, 3rd Viscount Fitzhardinge	1667-10-17	1628 – 13 June 1690
Miles Joseph Berkeley	1879-06-12	1 April 1803 – 30 July 1889
Randal Thomas Mowbray Rawdon Berkeley, 8th Earl Berkeley	1908-05-07	31 January 1865 – 15 January 1942
Samuel Frank Berkovic	2007-05-17	13 October 1953 –
John Desmond Bernal	1937-05-06	10 May 1901 – 15 September 1971
Charles Bernard	1696-11-30	1650–1711 Royal surgeon
Edward Bernard	1673-04-09	2 May 1638 – 12 January 1697
Hermann Bernard	1738-11-02	– 27 June 1766
James Bernard, 2nd Earl of Bandon	1845-06-05	14 June 1785 – 31 October 1856
Jean Baptiste Bernard	1760-03-27	1702–1779
John Peter Bernard	1738-01-19	– 5 April 1750
Timothy John Berners-Lee	2001-05-10	8 June 1955 –
Daniel Bernoulli	1750-05-03	10 February 1700 – 17 March 1782
Jean Bernoulli	1712-12-01	27 July 1667 – 1 January 1748
Nicholas Bernoulli	1714-03-11	10 October 1687 – 29 November 1759
Michael John Berridge	1984-03-15	22 October 1938 – 13 February 2020
Norman John Berrill	1952-03-20	28 April 1903 – 15 October 1996
Michael Victor Berry	1982-03-18	14 March 1941 –
Joseph-Etienne Berthier	1768-06-02	31 December 1702 – 15 November 1783
Claude Louis, Count Berthollet	1789-04-30	9 November 1748 – 6 November 1822
Ferdinand Berthoud	1764-02-16	1727–1807
Robert Bertie, 3rd Earl of Lindsey	1666-11-21	8 November 1630 – 8 May 1701
Julian Besag	2004-05-27	26 March 1945 – 6 August 2010 Prof of Statistics
William Henry Besant	1871-06-08	1 November 1828 – 2 June 1917
Abram Samoilovitch Besicovitch	1934-05-03	24 January 1891 – 2 November 1970
Gurdyal Besra	2019-04-16	
Henry Bessemer	1879-06-12	19 January 1813 – 15 March 1898
Charles Best	1938-03-17	28 February 1899 – 31 March 1978
George Best, Baron Best	1791-03-17	c. 1756 – 12 March 1823
John Bethune	1773-02-18	1725 – 15 April 1774 Clergyman
Coenraad van Beuningen	1682-12-13	1622 – 20 October 1693
Michael John Bevan	1991-03-14	
Michael Bevan	2013-05-02	5 June 1952 –
Silvanus Bevan	1725-12-09	28 October 1691 – 5 June 1765
Keith Beven	2017-05-05	23 July 1950 –
Charles James Beverly	1831-05-05	August 1788 – 16 September 1868
Raymond John Heaphy Beverton	1975-03-20	29 August 1922 – 23 July 1995
John Bevis	1765-11-21	31 October 1693 – 6 November 1771
John Herbert Beynon	1971-03-18	29 December 1923 – 24 August 2015
William John Granville Beynon	1973-03-15	24 May 1914 – 11 March 1996
Homi Jehangir Bhabha	1941-03-20	30 October 1909 – 24 January 1966
Harshad Kumar Dharamshi Hansraj Bhadeshia	1998-05-14	27 November 1953 –
Manjul Bhargava	2019-04-16	8 August 1974 –
Shanti Swarupa Bhatnagar	1943-03-18	22 February 1895 – 1 January 1955
Sushantha Kumar Bhattacharyya	2014-04-30	6 June 1940 – 1 March 2019
Vendramino Bianchi	1710-11-08	26 July 1667 – 12 January 1738
Francesco Bianchini	1713-01-29	13 December 1662 – 2 March 1729
Mervyn Bibb	2013-05-02	
James Ebenezer Bicheno	1827-05-10	26 January 1785 – 25 February 1851
Robert Bickersteth	1858-12-16	24 August 1816 – 15 April 1884
Richard Hussey Bickerton	1810-02-22	1760 – 9 February 1832
Michael James Bickle	2007-05-17	26 February 1948 –
Wendy Bickmore	2017-05-05	28 July 1961 –
John Laurens Bicknell	1821-03-08	c. 1786 – 3 August 1845
Govard Bidloo	1696-04-29	12 March 1649 – 31 December 1713
Shelford Bidwell	1886-06-04	6 March 1848 – 18 December 1909
Mariann Bienz	2003-05-15	
Rowland Harry Biffen	1914-05-07	28 May 1874 – 12 July 1949
George Biggin	1802-07-01	c. 1762 – 3 November 1803
Peter Martin Biggs	1976-03-18	
Jean-Paul Bignon	1734-11-07	19 September 1662 – 14 March 1743
John Jeremiah Bigsby	1869-06-03	15 August 1792 – 10 February 1881
Robert Bigsby	1837-06-08	11 April 1806 – 27 September 1873
Hendrik Johannes van der Bijl	1944-03-16	23 November 1887 – 2 December 1948
Bruce Alexander Bilby	1977-03-17	3 September 1922 – 20 November 2013 Mechanical Engineer
William Billers	1726-11-30	– 14 October 1745 Lord Mayor of London,1733
Archibald Billing	1844-06-06	10 January 1791 – 2 September 1881
Rupert Everett Billingham	1961-03-16	15 October 1921 – 16 November 2002
Henry Bilson-Legge	1745-01-10	29 May 1708 – 23 August 1764
John Bingham	1977-03-17	Crop geneticist
Robert Bingley	1809-06-22	– 17 July 1847
Edward William Binney	1856-06-05	7 December 1812 – 19 December 1881
James Jeffrey Binney	2000-05-11	12 April 1950 –
Alfred Maurice Binnie	1960-03-24	7 February 1901 – 31 December 1986
Geoffrey Morse Binnie	1975-03-20	13 November 1908 – 5 April 1989
Andrew Birch	1673-11-27	c. 1652 – c. 1691 Physician
Arthur John Birch	1958-03-20	3 August 1915 – 8 December 1995
Bryan John Birch	1972-03-16	25 September 1931 –
Thomas Birch	1735-02-20	23 November 1705 – 9 January 1766
James Derek Birchall	1982-03-18	7 October 1930 – 7 December 1995
Adrian Peter Bird	1989-03-16	3 July 1947 –
Golding Bird	1846-01-22	9 December 1814 – 27 October 1854
Robert Joseph Birgeneau	2001-05-10	25 March 1942 –
Caucher Birkar	16 April 2019	July 1978 –
John Birkenhead	1663-06-22	24 March 1616 – 4 December 1679 Original
Timothy Robert Birkhead	2004-05-27	28 February 1950 –
Ewan Birney	2014-04-30	6 December 1972 –
Peter Biron, Duke of Courland	1771-11-07	16 February 1724 – 13 January 1800
William Sawney Bisat	1947-03-20	19 October 1886 – 14 May 1973
Ann Bishop	1959-03-19	19 December 1899 – 7 May 1990 Parasitologist
Christopher Bishop	2017-05-05	7 April 1959 –
Dorothy Bishop	2014-04-30	14 February 1952 –
George Bishop	1848-06-09	21 August 1785 – 14 June 1861 Astronomer
John Bishop	1844-05-09	15 September 1797 – 29 September 1873 Surgeon
Peter Orlebar Bishop	1977-03-17	14 June 1917 – 3 June 2012 Prof. of Physiology, Australia
Richard Evelyn Donohue Bishop	1980-03-20	1 January 1925 – 12 September 1989
Philip Bisse	1706-02-13	1677 – 6 September 1721
Cecil Bisshopp, 12th Baron Zouche	1791-11-17	20 December 1753 – 11 November 1828
Barrington Pope Blachford	1815-06-01	– 14 May 1816
Davidson Black	1932-05-05	25 July 1884 – 15 March 1934
James Whyte Black	1976-03-18	14 June 1924 – 22 March 2010 Prof of Analytical Pharmacology, London
Elizabeth Helen Blackburn	1992-03-12	26 November 1948 –
John Blackburne	1794-11-20	5 August 1754 – 31 December 1833
Samuel Blackburne	1681-12-14	fl 1681
Thomas Blackburne	1781-06-14	c. 1749 – 23 June 1782
Patrick Maynard Stuart Blackett, Baron Blackett of Chelsea	1933-05-11	18 November 1897 – 13 July 1974, PRS 1965-1970
Frederick Frost Blackman	1906-05-03	25 July 1866 – 30 January 1947
Geoffrey Emett Blackman	1959-03-19	17 April 1903 – 8 February 1980
James Blackman	1827-03-29	1769 – 24 August 1831
Moses Blackman	1962-03-15	6 December 1908 – 3 June 1983
Vernon Herbert Blackman	1913-05-01	8 January 1872 – 1 October 1967
Jonas Blackwell	1692-11-30	– 22 June 1754
Frederick Temple Hamilton-Temple Blackwood, 1st Marquess of Dufferin and Ava	1865-02-09	21 June 1826 – 12 February 1902
Richard Blacow	1754-04-04	20 May 1723 – 13 May 1760
Charles Blagden	1772-06-25	17 April 1748 – 26 March 1820
Archibald Blair	1799-05-02	fl 1799
John Blair	1755-01-09	– 24 June 1782 Clergyman
Patrick Blair	1712-12-01	fl 1706–1728 Physician and Botanist
Andrew Blake	2005-05-26	12 March 1956 –
Benjamin Blake	1830-03-04	– c. 1868
Henry Wollaston Blake	1843-04-06	1815 – 27 June 1899
Francis Blake	1746-06-19	1708 – 29 March 1780
William Blake	1807-05-14	c. 1774 – 24 November 1852 Mathematician
William John Blake	1831-01-20	12 May 1805 – 15 September 1875
Colin Brian Blakemore	1992-03-12	1 June 1944 –
Peyton Blakiston	1841-01-21	6 September 1801 – 17 December 1878
Michael Bland	1816-02-08	c. 1777 – 19 April 1851 Brewer
Miles Bland	1821-04-12	11 October 1786 – 27 December 1867
Roger David Blandford	1989-03-16	28 August 1949 –
Gilbert Blane	1784-12-23	27 August 1749 – 27 June 1834
William Blane	1795-04-16	1750 – 1835
Henry Francis Blanford	1880-06-03	3 June 1834 – 23 January 1893
William Thomas Blanford	1874-06-04	7 October 1832 – 23 June 1905
Richard Blanshard	1827-05-10	c. 1781 – 21 February 1836 Merchant
Wilkinson Blanshard	1759-12-06	c. 1734 – 5 January 1770
John Blaquiere, 1st Baron de Blaquiere	1803-01-13	5 May 1732 – 27 August 1812
William Blaquiere	1805-02-21	27 January 1778 – 12 November 1851
Hermann Karl Felix Blaschko	1962-03-15	4 January 1900 – 18 April 1993
Kenneth Lyon Blaxter	1967-03-16	19 June 1919 – 18 April 1991
Brebis Bleaney	1950-03-16	6 June 1915 – 4 November 2006
Benjamin Blencowe	2019-04-16	
Edward Bligh, 2nd Earl of Darnley	1738-02-09	9 November 1715 – 22 July 1747
Edward Bligh, 5th Earl of Darnley	1833-05-02	26 February 1795 – 11 February 1835
John Bligh, 4th Earl of Darnley	1810-03-22	1767 – 17 March 1831
William Bligh	1801-05-21	? October 1754 – 7 December 1817
Roger John Blin-Stoyle	1976-03-18	24 December 1924 – 30 January 2007
Nathaniel Bliss	1742-05-20	28 November 1700 – 2 September 1764
Timothy Vivian Pelham Bliss	1994-03-10	27 July 1940 –
William Blizard	1787-05-03	1 March 1743 – 27 August 1835
Thomas Blizard	1803-03-10	1772 – 7 May 1838
Stephen R. Bloom	2013-05-02	24 October 1942 –
Edward Blore	1841-06-10	13 September 1787 – 4 September 1879
Thomas Blount	1665-02-08	c. 1604 – Soldier, Inventor
David Mervyn Blow	1972-03-16	27 June 1931 – 9 June 2004
Jeremy Bloxham	2007-05-17	29 April 1960 –
Tom Leon Blundell	1984-03-15	7 July 1942 –
Jonathan David Blundy	2008-05-16	7 August 1961 –
Richard Blyke	1773-04-29	– 1775
Norman Keith Boardman	1978-03-16	16 August 1926 – 26 October 2026
Henry Samuel Boase	1837-05-11	2 September 1799 – 5 May 1883
Martin Bobrow	2004-05-27	6 February 1938 –
Johann Elert Bode	1789-04-30	19 January 1747 – 23 November 1826
Walter Fred Bodmer	1974-03-21	10 January 1936 –
Herman Boerhaave	1730-04-30	31 December 1668 – 23 September 1738
Germain Boffrand	1745-01-10	7 May 1667 – 18 March 1754
William Bogdani	1730-02-26	– 1771
David Vernon Boger	2007-05-17	13 November 1939 – 5 July 2025
Johann Baptist Bohadsch	1762-12-23	– 1772
David Joseph Bohm	1990-03-15	20 December 1917 – 27 October 1992
John Theophilus Boileau	1840-03-05	21 May 1805 – 7 November 1886
John Peter Boileau	1843-06-01	2 September 1794 – 9 March 1869
Charles Du Bois	1700-11-30	? 1656 – 21 October 1740
Alexander Boksenberg	1978-03-16	18 March 1936 –
Peter Patten Bold	1815-01-19	– 17 October 1819
Béla Bollobás	2011-05-19	3 August 1943 –
Charles Bolton	1918-05-02	24 September 1870 – 6 December 1947 Pathologist
John Gatenby Bolton	1973-03-15	5 June 1922 – 6 July 1993
Francois Xavier Bon	1739-02-15	15 October 1678 – 18 January 1761
George Bond	1972-03-16	22 February 1906 – 5 January 1988 Prof. of Biology
John Richard Bond	2001-05-10	1950 – Canadian cosmologist
Phineas Bond	1815-03-16	c. 1748–1815
Hermann Bondi	1959-03-19	1 November 1919 – 10 September 2005
Quentin Bone	1984-03-15	17 August 1931 – 6 July 2021
William Arthur Bone	1905-05-11	19 March 1871 – 11 June 1938
Ludwig Friedrich Bonet	1711-11-30	– ? 1773
William Bonfield	2003-05-15	6 March 1937 –
Silvestro Bonfigliuoli	1696-04-29	? 1637 – ? 12
John George Bonner	1840-06-18	c. 1788 – 3 March 1867
Charles Bonnet	1743-11-17	13 March 1720 – 20 May 1793
Thomas George Bonney	1878-06-06	27 July 1833 – 10 December 1923
Frank Featherstone Bonsall	1970-03-19	31 March 1920 – 22 February 2011
George Boole	1857-06-11	2 November 1815 – 8 December 1864
William Robert Boon	1974-03-21	20 March 1911 – 28 October 1994
Benjamin Booth	1772-01-09	– 21 April 1807
Charles Booth	1899-06-01	30 March 1840 – 23 November 1916
Eric Stuart Booth	1967-03-16	14 October 1914 – 1 May 2005
James Booth	1846-01-22	25 August 1806 – 15 April 1878 Clergyman & Mathematician
Felix Booth	1834-04-10	1775 – 25 January 1850
Peniston Booth	1703-02-03	1681 – 21 September 1765
Richard Wilbraham Bootle	1761-04-02	– 1796
Robert Bootle	1757-12-08	– 7 May 1758
Richard Ewen Borcherds	1994-03-10	29 November 1959 –
Jules Jean Baptiste Vincent Bordet	1916-03-23	13 June 1870 – 6 April 1961
Marcantonio Borghese, Principe di Sulmona e Rossano	1682-11-29	20 May 1660 – 22 May 1729
George Simon Borlase	1828-11-20	30 January 1792 – 19 March 1837
William Borlase	1750-05-17	3 February 1695 – 31 August 1772
Gustav Victor Rudolf Born	1972-03-16	29 July 1921 – 16 April 2018
Ignace De Born	1774-06-02	26 December 1742 – 24 July 1791
Max Born	1939-03-16	11 December 1882 – 5 January 1970
Philip Julius Borneman	1722-11-01	fl 1722–1726
William Borrer	1835-06-04	13 June 1781 – 10 January 1862
Leszek Borysiewicz	2008-05-16	13 April 1951 –
Benjamin Bosanquet	1747-05-21	25 September 1708 – 22 December 1755
Robert Holford Macdowall Bosanquet	1890-06-05	30 July 1841 – 7 August 1912
Samuel Bosanquet	1793-06-06	1768–1843
Roger Joseph Boscovich	1761-01-15	19 May 1711 – 13 February 1787
Georg Matthias Bose	1757-06-30	22 September 1710 – 17 September 1761
Satyendra Nath Bose	1958-03-20	1 January 1894 – 4 February 1974
Jagadish Chandra Bose	1920-05-13	30 November 1858 – 23 November 1937
Brice Bosnich	2000-05-11	3 June 1936 – 13 April 2015
Hugh Bostock	2001-05-10	25 August 1944 –
John Bostock	1818-04-02	1773 – 6 August 1846
William Bosville	1792-06-07	21 July 1745 – 16 December 1813
Percy George Hamnall Boswell	1931-05-07	7 August 1886 – 22 December 1960
Joseph Bosworth	1829-06-04	1789 – 27 May 1876
Beriah Botfield	1839-01-17	5 March 1807 – 7 August 1863
Thomas Botfield	1833-04-18	1762 – 17 January 1843
Martin Harold Phillips Bott	1977-03-17	12 July 1926 – 20 October 2018
James Thomson Bottomley	1888-06-07	10 January 1845 – 18 May 1926
Domenico Bottoni	1695-10-23	6 October 1641 – c. 1721
Louis Antoine de Bougainville	1756-01-08	11 November 1729 – 31 August 1811
John Fenton Boughey	1822-12-05	1 May 1784 – 27 June 1823
Sir Charles Rouse-Boughton, 9th Baronet	1814-05-05	December 1747 – 26 February 1821
William Edward Rouse Boughton	1814-05-05	14 September 1788 – 22 May 1856
Pierre Bouguer	1750-01-25	17 February 1698 – 15 August 1758
George Albert Boulenger	1894-06-07	19 October 1858 – 23 November 1937
Geoffrey Stewart Boulton	1992-03-12	28 November 1940 –
Matthew Boulton	1785-11-24	3 September 1728 – 18 August 1809
Claude Bourdelin	1703	20 June 1667 – 20 April 1711
Gilbert Charles Bourne	1910-05-05	5 July 1861 – 9 March 1933
Alfred Gibbs Bourne	1895-06-13	8 August 1859 – 14 July 1940
Jacques Louis, Count of Bournon	1802-02-25	21 January 1751 – 24 August 1825
William Robert Bousfield	1916-05-11	12 January 1854 – 16 July 1943
William Bouverie, 1st Earl of Radnor	1767-12-17	27 February 1725 – 28 January 1776
Henry Taylor Bovey	1902-06-05	7 March 1850 – 2 February 1912
William Bovill	1867-05-09	26 May 1814 – 1 November 1873
Frank Philip Bowden	1948-03-18	2 May 1903 – 3 September 1968
Thomas Bowdler	1781-05-10	12 July 1754 – 24 February 1825
James Bowdoin	1788-04-03	7 August 1726 – 6 November 1790
Charles Synge Christopher Bowen, Baron Bowen	1885-05-21	1 January 1835 – 10 April 1894
David Keith Bowen	1998-05-14	
Edmund John Bowen	1935-05-16	29 April 1898 – 19 November 1980
Edward George Bowen	1975-03-20	14 January 1911 – 12 August 1991
Frederick Orpen Bower	1891-06-04	4 November 1855 – 11 April 1948
Thomas Bower	1712-10-23	fl 1703–1723 Prof. of Maths., Aberdeen
James Scott Bowerbank	1842-11-17	July 1797 – 8 March 1877
Martin Bowes	1699-11-30	c. 1671–1726 Barrister
Stanley Hay Umphray Bowie	1975-03-20	24 March 1917 – 3 September 2008
William Bowman	1841-04-22	20 July 1816 – 29 March 1892
Walter Bowman	1742-11-04	– February 1782
John Bowring	1856-06-05	17 October 1792 – 23 November 1872
George Edward Pelham Box	1985-03-21	18 October 1919 – 28 March 2013
Edward Mourrier Boxer	1858-06-03	
Geoffrey Allan Boxshall	1994-03-10	13 June 1950 –
Rubert William Boyce	1902-06-05	22 April 1863 – 16 June 1911
Arthur Edwin Boycott	1914-05-07	6 April 1877 – 12 May 1938
Brian Blundell Boycott	1971-03-18	10 December 1924 – 22 April 2000
John Smith Knox Boyd	1951-03-15	18 September 1891 – 10 June 1981
Robert Lewis Fullarton Boyd	1969-03-20	20 October 1922 – 5 February 2004
Jean Baptiste Nicolas Boyer	1749-04-20	1693 – 2 April 1768
Charles Boyle, 4th Earl of Orrery	1706-04-03	28 July 1674 – 28 August 1731
Charles Boyle, 3rd Viscount Dungarvan	1664-01-06	17 November 1639 – 12 October 1694
Courtenay Boyle	1814-06-23	3 September 1770 – 21 May 1844
George Boyle, 4th Earl of Glasgow	1788-06-05	? 18 September 1765 – 6 July 1843
John Boyle, 5th Earl of Cork	1746-10-23	2 January 1707 – 16 November 1762
Richard Boyle	1663-05-20	– 3 June 1665 Original MP, KIA
Richard Boyle, 3rd Earl of Burlington and 4th Earl of Cork	1722-10-25	25 April 1695 – 15 December 1753
Robert Boyle	1663-04-22	25 January 1627 – 30 December 1691
Zabdiel Boylston	1726-07-07	9 March 1679 – 1 March 1766
Samuel Francis Boys	1972-03-16	20 December 1911 – 16 October 1972
Charles Vernon Boys	1888-06-07	15 March 1855 – 30 March 1944
Edward Arthur Boyse	1977-03-17	11 August 1923 – 14 July 2007
Claude Gros de Boze	1749-04-06	1680 – 10 September 1753
Laurence Braddon	1681-04-27	– 29 November 1724
John Rose Bradford	1894-06-07	7 May 1863 – 7 April 1935
Albert James Bradley	1939-03-16	5 January 1899 – 4 September 1972
Allan Bradley	2002-05-09	
Daniel Joseph Bradley	1976-03-18	18 January 1928 – 7 February 2010 Prof of Optical Electronics, Dublin
Derek Bradley	1988-03-17	
Donal Donat Conor Bradley	2004-05-27	3 January 1962 –
Donald Charlton Bradley	1980-03-20	7 November 1924 – 20 December 2014
James Bradley	1718-11-06	March 1693 – 13 July 1762
Richard Bradley	1712-12-01	– ? 5 November 1732
Alexander Marian Bradshaw	2008-05-16	12 July 1944 –
Anthony David Bradshaw	1982-03-18	17 January 1926 – 21 August 2008
Peter Bradshaw	1981-03-19	26 December 1935 –
George Stewardson Brady	1882-06-08	18 April 1832 – 25 December 1921
Henry Bowman Brady	1874-06-04	24 February 1835 – ? 3 January 1891
John Michael Brady	1997-05-15	30 April 1945 – Information Engineering, Oxford Univ.
William Henry Bragg	1907-05-02	2 July 1862 – 12 March 1942, PRS 1935-1940
William Lawrence Bragg	1921-05-12	31 March 1890 – 1 July 1971
Walter Russell Brain, 1st Baron Brain	1964-03-19	23 October 1895 – 29 December 1966
Daniel Braithwaite	1782-03-14	c. 1731 – 28 December 1817
Paul Martin Brakefield	2010-05-20	31 May 1952 –
William Brakenridge	1752-11-09	c. 1700 – 30 July 1762
Francis William Rogers Brambell	1949-03-17	26 February 1901 – 6 June 1970
George William Wilshere, Baron Bramwell	1882-01-12	12 June 1808 – 9 May 1892
Frederick Joseph Bramwell	1873-06-12	7 March 1818 – 30 November 1903
Andrea Hilary Brand	2010-05-20	9 March 1959 –
William Thomas Brande	1809-04-13	12 February 1788 – 11 February 1866
Gustavus Brander	1754-03-07	1720 – 21 January 1787
Dietrich Brandis	1875-06-03	31 March 1824 – 29 May 1907
Henry Rowland Brandreth	1841-01-21	– 20 February 1848
Thomas Shaw Brandreth	1821-03-08	24 July 1788 – 27 May 1873
Gilles Brassard	2013-05-02	20 April 1955 –
William Brattle	1714-03-11	22 November 1662 – 15
Kenneth Noel Corbett Bray	1991-03-14	
Edward William Brayley	1854-06-01	1803 – 1 February 1870
Robert Bree	1808-02-11	1759 – 6 October 1839
Francois de Bremond	1741-02-26	14 September 1713 – 1742
Sydney Brenner	1965-03-18	13 January 1927 – 5 April 2019
Owen Salusbury Brereton	1762-06-17	1715 – 8 September 1798
William Brereton, 3rd Baron Brereton	1663-04-22	May 1632 – 17 March 1680 Original
Mark Steven Bretscher	1985-03-21	8 January 1940 –
David Brewster	1815-05-04	12 December 1781 – 10 February 1868
Johannes Philippus Breynius	1703-04-21	c. 1680–1764
Percy Wragg Brian	1958-03-20	5 September 1910 – 17 August 1979
Bewick Bridge	1812-06-11	1767 – 15 May 1833
Thomas William Bridge	1903-06-11	5 November 1848 – 29 June 1909
Tom A. Bridgeland	2014-04-30	1973 –
Orlando Bridgeman	1696-04-29	– 25 April 1731
Orlando Bridgeman	1698-03-23	? December 1649 – 20 April 1701
William Bridgeman	1679-12-18	c. 1646-10 May 1699
Edward Bridgen	1777-03-13	– 28 July 1787
Edward Ettingdean Bridges, Baron Bridges	1952-05-15	4 August 1892 – 27 August 1969
John Bridges	1708-04-07	1666 – 16 March 1724 Barrister
Brook Bridges	1726-05-12	12 August 1679 – 16 March 1728
William Bridgman	1821-03-15	– 6 December 1847
Martin Robert Bridson	2016-04-29	1964 –
Derek Ernest Gilmor Briggs	1999-05-13	10 January 1950 –
George Edward Briggs	1935-05-16	25 June 1893 – 7 February 1985
John Briggs	1838-11-22	18 September 1785 – 27 April 1875 EIC officer
Robert Briggs	1693-11-30	1660 – 22 December 1718
Richard Bright	1821-03-08	28 September 1789 – 16 December 1858
Owen Brigstocke	1710-11-30	? April 1679 – April 1746
Margaret Brimble	2018-05-09	20 August 1961 –
Giles Skey Brindley	1965-03-18	30 April 1926 –
David Maurice Brink	1981-03-19	Physics Professor, Oxford University
John Brinkley, Bishop of Cloyne	1803-03-17	1763 – 14 September 1835
William Brinton	1864-06-02	20 November 1823 – 17 January 1867
Thomas Makdougall Brisbane	1810-05-10	23 July 1773 – 27 January 1860
James Briscoe	2019-04-16	
Henry William Bristow	1862-06-05	17 May 1817 – 14 June 1889
William Bristow	1742-03-25	– 22 March 1758
John Syer Bristowe	1881-06-02	19 January 1827 – 20 August 1895
Donald Eric Broadbent	1968-03-21	6 May 1926 – 10 April 1993
Edward Granville Broadbent	1977-03-17	
William Henry Broadbent	1897-06-03	23 January 1835 – 10 July 1907
Neil Brockdorff	2018-05-09	1958 –
William Brockedon	1834-12-18	13 October 1787 – 29 August 1854
Jeremy Patrick Brockes	1994-03-10	29 February 1948 –
Bertram Neville Brockhouse	1965-03-18	15 July 1918 – 13 October 2003
Richard Brocklesby	1747-02-26	11 August 1722 – 11 December 1797
Charles Broderip	1816-01-11	fl 1816
William John Broderip	1828-02-14	21 November 1789 – 27 February 1859
James Brodie	1797-07-06	31 August 1744 – 17 January 1824
Benjamin Collins Brodie	1849-06-07	6 February 1817 – 24 November 1880
Benjamin Collins Brodie	1810-02-18	9 June 1783 – 21 October 1862, PRS 1858-1861
Thomas Gregor Brodie	1904-05-05	9 February 1866 – 20 August 1916
Alec Nigel Broers	1986-03-20	17 September 1938 –
Robert Bromfield	1779-04-15	– 24 March 1786 Physician
Thomas Bromfield	1714-03-11	c. 1678–1722
Edward Thomas French Bromhead	1817-03-13	26 March 1789 – 14 March 1855
Thomas John I'Anson Bromwich	1906-05-03	9 February 1875 – 24 August 1929
Charles Brooke	1847-03-04	30 June 1804 – 17 May 1879
Henry James Brooke	1819-04-22	25 May 1771 – 26 June 1857
John Brooke	1819-01-21	28 January 1773 – 23 November 1821 Clergyman
Arthur de Capell Brooke	1823-05-29	22 October 1791 – 6 December 1858
John Brooke	1662-01-08	c. 1635 – 18 November 1691 Original
William O'Shaughnessy Brooke	1843-03-16	October 1809 – 10 January 1889 See William Brooke O'Shaughnessy
Joshua Brookes	1819-11-18	24 November 1761 – 10 January 1833
Joseph Brookesbank	1751-06-13	– 19 April 1759
Frederick Tom Brooks	1930-05-15	17 December 1882 – 11 March 1952
John Burns Brooksby	1980-03-20	25 December 1914 – 17 December 1998
Robert Broom	1920-05-13	30 November 1866 – 6 April 1951
Henry Peter Brougham, 1st Baron Brougham and Vaux	1803-03-03	19 September 1778 – 7 May 1868
Robert Edwards Broughton	1842-02-17	c. 1781 – 29 June 1860
Samuel Daniel Broughton	1830-02-11	July 1787 – 20 August 1837
John Allan Broun	1853-06-02	21 September 1817 – 22 November 1879
William Brouncker, 2nd Viscount Brouncker	1660-11-28	c. 1620 – 5 April 1684, PRS 1662-1677
Peter Maria Augustus Broussonet	1782-02-14	19 January 1761 – 27 July 1807
Charles Edward Brown-Sequard	1860-06-07	8 April 1817 – 1 April 1894
Adrian John Brown	1911-05-04	1852 – 2 July 1919
Alexander Crum Brown	1879-06-12	26 March 1838 – 28 October 1922
Daniel McGillivray Brown	1982-03-18	3 February 1923 – 24 April 2012 Chemist
David Anthony Brown	1990-03-15	
Edward Brown	1668-01-02	1644 – 28 August 1708 Physician
Ernest William Brown	1898-06-09	29 November 1866 – ? 22 July 1938
Fred Brown	1981-03-19	31 January 1925 – 20 February 2004 Virologist
George Lindor Brown	1946-03-21	10 February 1903 – 22 February 1971
George Malcolm Brown	1975-03-20	5 October 1925 – 27 March 1997
Horace Tabberer Brown	1889-06-06	20 July 1848 – 6 February 1925
John Brown	1902-06-5	25 February 1850 – 1 November 1911 Manufacturer
John Michael Brown	1996-03-14	
John Milton Brown	2003-05-15	
Lawrence Michael Brown	1982-03-18	18 March 1936 –
Littleton Brown	1730-01-15	– 1749
Malcolm Watson Brown	2004-05-27	
Nicholas Brown	1826-06-15	fl 1826
Robert Brown	1811-12-12	21 December 1773 – 10 June 1858
Robert Brown	1956-03-15	29 July 1908 – July 1999 Plant Physiologist
Robert Hanbury Brown	1960-03-24	31 August 1916 – 16 January 2002
Sidney George Brown	1916-05-11	6 July 1873 – 7 August 1948
Steve David Macleod Brown	2015-05-01	3 May 1955 – Director, Medical Research Council
Thomas Graham Brown	1927-05-12	27 March 1882 – 28 October 1965
William Brown	1938-03-17	18 February 1888 – 18 January 1975 Plant pathologist
William Brown	1777-02-20	c. 1747 – 26 April 1794 County Clerk
Henry Browne	1797-05-25	c. 1754 – 16 June 1830 East India Company
Isaac Hawkins Browne	1770-07-05	7 December 1745 – 30 May 1818
Isaac Hawkins Browne	1750-02-22	22 January 1705 – 14 February 1760
Edmund John Philip Browne, Baron Browne of Madingley	2006-05-18	20 February 1948 –
John Browne	1721-11-30	– 8 June 1735 Chemist
William Browne	1739-02-15	1692 – 10 March 1774
Thomas Browne	1699-11-30	January 1673 – 1710 Physician
Carl Hamilton Browning	1928-05-10	21 May 1881 – 22 January 1972
Keith Anthony Browning	1978-03-16	31 July 1938 –
George Gow Brownlee	1987-03-19	13 January 1942 –
John Brownlow, Baron Brownlow of Belton	1783-05-08	1744 – 25 December 1807
John Brownlow, 1st Viscount Tyrconnel	1735-04-17	c. 1690–1754
William Brownrigg	1742-05-20	24 March 1711 – 6 January 1800
Alexander Bruce, 2nd Earl of Kincardine	1663-05-20	c. 1629 – 9 July 1680
David Bruce	1663-05-20	fl 1657-1690 Original, Physician
David Bruce	1899-06-01	29 May 1855 – 27 November 1931
Henry Austin Bruce, 1st Baron Aberdare	1876-01-20	16 April 1815 – 25 February 1895
James Bruce	1776-01-11	14 December 1730 – 27 April 1794
John Bruce	1791-05-26	1745 – 16 April 1826
Peter George Bruce	2007-05-17	2 October 1956 –
Robert Bruce, 2nd Earl of Elgin	1663-05-20	March 1626 – 20 October 1685
Stanley Melbourne Bruce, Viscount Bruce of Melbourne	1944-06-15	15 April 1883 – 25 August 1967
Johann Moritz, Count of Bruhl	1765-11-07	20 December 1736 – 9 June 1809
Isambard Kingdom Brunel	1830-06-10	9 April 1806 – 15 September 1859
Marc Isambard Brunel	1814-03-24	25 April 1769 – 12 December 1849
Giuseppe Lorenzo Bruni	1744-02-23	– 18 November 1775
David Brunt	1939-03-16	17 June 1886 – 5 February 1965
Thomas Lauder Brunton	1874-06-04	14 March 1844 – 16 December 1916
Norman Adrian de Bruyne	1967-03-16	8 November 1904 – 7 March 1997
George Hartley Bryan	1895-06-13	1 March 1864 – 13 October 1928
Peter Elwood Bryant	1991-03-14	
James Bryce, Viscount Bryce	1893-12-14	10 May 1838 – 22 January 1922
Thomas Hastie Bryce	1922-05-11	20 October 1862 – 16 May 1946
Harry Leonard Bryden	2005-05-26	9 July 1946 –
James Brydges, 1st Duke of Chandos	1694-11-30	6 January 1674 – 9 August 1744
Patrick Brydone	1773-03-04	5 January 1736 – 19 June 1818
Alexander Bryson	1854-06-01	1802 – 12 December 1869
William Maguire Bryson	2013-05-02	8 December 1951 – Honorary Fellow
Alexander Buchan	1898-06-09	11 April 1829 – 13 May 1907
Francis Buchanan-Hamilton	1806-05-01	15 February 1762 – 15 June 1829
John Young Buchanan	1887-06-09	20 February 1844 – 16 October 1925
George Buchanan	1882-06-08	5 November 1831 – 5 May 1895 Physician
Andreas Elias Buchner	1763-02-17	9 April 1701 – 29 July 1769
Martin Buck	2009-05-15	
Amyand David Buckingham	1975-03-20	28 January 1930 –
William Buckland	1818-02-26	12 March 1784 – 15 August 1856
John Charles Bucknill	1866-06-07	25 December 1817 – 19 July 1897
George Bowdler Buckton	1857-06-11	24 May 1818 – 25 September 1905
George Budd	1836-01-21	23 February 1808 – 14 March 1882
William Budd	1871-06-08	? 11 September 1811 – 9 January 1880
Kenneth Budden	1966-03-17	23 June 1915 – 4 September 2005
Thomas Bugge	1788-04-03	12 October 1740 – 15 January 1815
Paul Buissiere	1699-11-30	c. 1655 – January 1739
George Buist	1846-01-29	? 22 November 1805 – 1 October 1860
Edith Bulbring	1958-03-20	27 December 1903 – 4 July 1990
Eugenius Bulgaris	1788-04-03	1716–1806
Richard Bulkeley	1685-11-25	17 August 1660 – 7 April 1710
Edward Crisp Bullard	1941-03-20	21 September 1907 – 3 April 1980
Keith Edward Bullen	1949-03-17	29 June 1906 – 23 September 1976
Arthur Henry Reginald Buller	1929-05-02	19 August 1874 – 3 July 1944
Walter Lawry Buller	1879-06-12	9 October 1838 – 19 July 1906
William Bullerwell	1972-03-16	27 September 1916 – 25 November 1977
Ismael Bullialdus	1667-04-04	28 September 1605 – 25 November 1694
William Bulloch	1913-05-01	19 August 1868 – 11 February 1941 Bacteriologist
Ronald Bullough	1985-03-21	6 April 1931 – 20 November 2020
Oliver Meredith Boone Bulman	1940-03-14	20 May 1902 – 18 February 1974
Michael George Bulmer	1997-05-15	10 May 1931 –
Charles James Fox Bunbury	1851-06-05	5 February 1809 – 18 June 1886
Alan Richard Bundy	2012-04-19	18 May 1947 Prof. of Informatics
Oscar Peter Buneman	2009-05-15	1943 –
Charles William Bunn	1967-03-16	15 January 1905 – 13 April 1990
Eleanor Margaret Burbidge	1964-03-19	12 August 1919 – 5 April 2020
Geoffrey Ronald Burbidge	1968-03-21	24 September 1925 – 26 January 2010 Physicist, San Diego
Samuel Hawksley Burbury	1890-06-05	18 May 1831 – 18 August 1911
Cecil Reginald Burch	1944-03-16	12 May 1901 – 19 July 1983
George James Burch	1900-06-14	11 May 1852 – 17 February 1914
William Ernest Burcham	1957-03-21	
Frederick Michael Burdekin	1993-03-11	1938 –
John Scott Burdon-Sanderson	1867-06-06	21 December 1828 – 23 November 1905
William Burge	1840-05-21	1786 – 12 November 1849
Arnold Stanley Vincent Burgen	1964-03-19	20 March 1922 –
Neil Burgess	2017-05-05	1966 –
Thomas Burgess	1807-02-19	18 November 1756 – 19 February 1837
Ivan de Burgh Daly	1943-03-18	14 April 1893 – 8 February 1974
John Smith de Burgh, 11th Earl of Clanricarde	1753-02-08	11 Nov 1720 – 21 April 1782
John Fox Burgoyne	1856-06-05	24 July 1782 – 7 October 1871
Eric Henry Stoneley Burhop	1963-03-21	31 January 1911 – 22 January 1980
Philip George Burke	1978-03-16	18 October 1932 – 4 June 2019
John Charles Burkill	1953-03-19	2 February 1900 – 6 April 1993
Denis Parsons Burkitt	1972-03-16	28 February 1911 – 23 March 1993
John Boscawen Burland	1997-05-15	4 March 1936 –
Eric Burman	1728-06-27	23 September 1692 – 3 November 1729 Swedish Mathematician
Joshua Harold Burn	1942-03-19	6 March 1892 – 13 July 1981
Richard Higgins Burne	1927-05-12	5 April 1868 – 9 October 1953
James Burnes	1835-04-02	13 February 1801 – 19 September 1862 Surgeon
Alexander Burnes	1834-04-10	16 May 1805 – 2 November 1841
John Burnet	1837-03-16	20 March 1784 – 29 April 1868
Frank Macfarlane Burnet	1942-03-19	3 September 1899 – 31 August 1985
Thomas Burnet	1838-05-03	– 7 January 1875 Clergyman
William Burnet	1706-02-13	March 1688 – 7 September 1729
Gilbert Burnett	1664-03-23	18 September 1643 – 17 March 1715
Gilbert Burnett	1723-11-30	1690 – 17 June 1726
Keith Burnett	2001-05-10	30 September 1953 –
Thomas Burnett	1748-12-22	1694 – 8 January 1753 Judge
William Burnett	1833-04-18	1779 – 16 February 1861
Charles Burney	1802-02-25	4 December 1757 – 28 December 1817
Charles Burney	1773-12-16	12 April 1726 – 12 April 1814
Charles Parr Burney	1814-12-22	19 October 1785 – 1 November 1864
James Burney	1809-06-08	1750 – 17 November 1821
Benedict Delisle Burns	1968-03-21	23 February 1915 – 6 September 2001
John Burns	1830-04-01	1774 – 18 June 1850
William Burnside	1893-06-01	2 July 1852 – 21 August 1927
Geoffrey Burnstock	1986-03-20	10 May 1929 – 2 June 2020
Sidney Gerald Burrard	1904-05-05	12 August 1860 – 16 March 1943
Peter Burrell	1752-05-28	27 August 1724 – 6 November 1775
Jeremy Henley Burroughes	2012-04-19	August 1960 –
William Burroughs	1817-04-24	– 1829 Barrister
Edward John Burrow	1818-02-26	1785 – 8 August 1861
Robert Burrow	1762-03-18	– 13 August 1793
James Burrow	1737-04-07	28 November 1701 – 5 November 1782, PRS 1768-1768
George Burrows	1847-04-22	28 November 1801 – 12 December 1887 Physician and President of RS
John P. Burrows	2016-04-29	16 August 1954 –
Malcolm Burrows	1985-03-21	28 May 1943 –
Michael Burrows	2013-05-02	1963 –
Thomas Seymour Burt	1836-03-17	c. 1805 – 8 March 1890
Decimus Burton	1832-12-06	30 September 1800 – 14 December 1881
Edward Burton	1836-05-05	9 January 1791 – 11 March 1867 Magistrate
Kenneth Burton	1974-03-21	26 June 1926 – 22 November 2010
Charles William Bury, 1st Earl of Charleville	1803-03-31	1764 – 31 October 1835
Edward Bury	1844-02-01	22 October 1794 – 25 November 1858
Thomas Bury	1718-12-01	1655 – 4 May 1722
Thaddeus Joseph, Count Burzynski	1769-05-11	– 1773
John Busby	1719-04-09	fl 1719
Stephen John Williams Busby	2005-05-26	
Amyas Bushe	1758-06-15	fl 1758
George Busk	1850-06-06	12 August 1807 – 10 August 1886
Colin Gasking Butler	1970-03-19	26 October 1913 – 4 January 2016
George Butler	1819-05-20	5 July 1774 – 30 April 1853
John Alfred Valentine Butler	1956-03-15	15 February 1899 – 16 July 1977
Samuel Butler, Bishop of Lichfield	1822-06-27	30 January 1774 – 4 December 1839
Clifford Charles Butler	1961-03-16	20 May 1922 – 19 June 1999
Edwin John Butler	1926-05-06	13 August 1874 – 4 April 1943
Peter A. Butler	2019-04-16	22 November 1949 –
John Martin Butt	1767-02-26	– October 1769
John Butter	1822-03-21	22 January 1791 – 13 January 1877
Anthony Edward Butterworth	1994-03-10	
Ian Butterworth	1981-03-19	3 December 1930 – 29 November 2013 Prof. of Physics, Imperial College, London
George Buxton	1779-04-22	14 December 1730 – 1 January 1805 Physician
Patrick Alfred Buxton	1943-03-18	24 March 1892 – 13 December 1955
Willem Buys	1706-02-13	1661–1749
George Stevens Byng, 2nd Earl of Strafford	1841-05-06	8 June 1806 – 29 October 1886
George Byng, 6th Viscount Torrington	1817-06-19	5 November 1768 – 18 June 1831
William Byrd	1696-04-29	28 March 1674 – 26 August 1744
John Byrom	1724-03-12	29 February 1692 – 26 September 1763
George Gordon Byron, 6th Baron Byron	1816-01-11	22 January 1788 – 19 April 1824
Edward Bysshe	1663-06-22	c. 1615 – 15 December 1679 Original

=== C ===
Name	Election date	Notes
Benjamin Bond Cabbell	1837-01-19	1781 – 9 December 1874
William Archibald Cadell	1810-06-28	28 June 1775 – 19 February 1855
John Cadman, 1st Baron Cadman	1940-03-14	7 September 1877 – 31 May 1941
Charles Cadogan, 2nd Baron Cadogan	1718-12-1	1685 – 24 September 1776
John Cadogan	1976-03-18	8 October 1930 – 9 February 2020
William Cadogan	1752-05-28	1712 – 26 February 1797
Susanne von Caemmerer	2017-05-05	
Robert Wolfgang Cahn	1991-03-14	9 September 1924 – 9 April 2007
Arthur James Cain	1989-03-16	25 July 1921 – 20 August 1999
James Caird	1875-06-03	29 July 1816 – 9 February 1892
Hugh John Forster Cairns	1974-03-21	21 November 1922 – 12 November 2018
Marco Antonio Leopoldo Caldani	1772-06-04	21 November 1725 – 30 December 1813
Alexander Caldcleugh	1831-03-10	– ? 11 June 1858
John Caldecott	1840-02-20	1800 – 16 December 1849
William Calderwood	1776-06-06	– 3 July 1787
Peter Christopher Caldwell	1975-03-20	25 January 1927 – 7 June 1979
James Caldwell	1752-12-21	c. 1722 – Army Officer
John Caley	1821-06-07	c. 1763 – 28 April 1834
John Call	1775-11-09	30 June 1732 – 1 March 1801
Christopher Reuben Calladine	1984-03-15	19 January 1935 –
Paul Terence Callaghan	2001-05-10	19 August 1947 – 24 March 2012 Physicist, New Zealand
Harold Garnet Callan	1963-03-21	5 March 1917 – 3 November 1993
Hugh Longbourne Callendar	1894-06-07	18 April 1863 – 21 January 1930
George William Callender	1871-06-08	24 June 1830 – 20 October 1878
Robert Kenneth Callow	1958-03-20	15 February 1901 – 12 April 1983
William Thomas Calman	1921-05-12	29 December 1871 – 29 September 1952
Roy Yorke Calne	1974-03-21	30 December 1930 –
Edward Killwick Calver	1873-06-12	6 December 1813 – 28 October 1892
Benedict Leonard Calvert	1731-03-25	21 September 1700 – 1 June 1732
Charles Calvert, 5th Baron Baltimore	1731-12-09	29 September 1699 – 24 April 1751
Frederick Crace Calvert	1859-06-09	14 November 1819 – 24 October 1873
Frederick Calvert, 6th Baron Baltimore	1767-02-26	7 February 1732 – 14 September 1771
Peter Calvert	1781-03-29	– 13 August 1788
William Camac	1821-02-01	c. 1762 – 11 August 1837
John Campbell	1868-06-04	31 March 1817 – 30 June 1878 Ordnance Survey
Gordon Roy Cameron	1946-03-21	30 June 1899 – 7 October 1966
Alexander Robert Campbell-Johnston	1845-06-05	14 June 1812 – 21 January 1888
Archibald Campbell, 1st Baron Blythswood	1907-05-02	23 February 1835 – 8 July 1908
Archibald Campbell, 9th Earl of Argyll	1663-10-28	27 February 1629 – 30 June 1685
Colin Campbell	1730-12-10	– 26 January 1752
Eleanor Campbell	2010-05-25	13 April 1960 –
Fergus William Campbell	1978-03-16	30 January 1924 – 3 May 1993
George Campbell	1730-12-10	– 10 May 1766
George Douglas Campbell, 8th Duke of Argyll	1851-06-19	30 April 1823 – 24 April 1900
Hugh Campbell	1748-05-19	fl 1748
Hugh Campbell, 3rd Earl of Marchmont	1753-02-01	15 March 1708 – 10 January 1794
Iain Donald Campbell	1995-03-09	24 April 1941 – 5 March 2014 Biochemist
James Campbell	1718-12-01	– 21 January 1733 Army Physician
John Campbell	1764-05-17	c. 1720 – 16 December 1790
John Campbell, 7th Duke of Argyll	1819-05-20	21 December 1777 – 25 April 1847
John Edward Campbell	1905-05-11	17 May 1862 – 1 October 1924
John Campbell, 1st Earl of Cawdor	1812-06-11	8 November 1790 – 7 November 1860
John Campbell, 2nd Marquess of Breadalbane	1834-06-05	26 October 1796 – 8 November 1862
John Campbell, 4th Earl of Breadalbane	1784-02-19	1762 – 29 March 1834
John Campbell, 4th Earl of Loudoun	1738-02-09	5 May 1705 – 27 April 1782
John Campbell, Baron Cawdor	1795-06-04	c. 1755 – 1 June 1821
Lord Frederick Campbell	1793-11-07	1729 – 8 June 1816
Simon Fraser Campbell	1999-05-13	27 March 1941 –
Peter Camper	1751-01-17	11 May 1722 – 7 April 1789
Charles Etienne Louis Camus	1764-01-26	26 August 1699 – 2 February 1768
Philip Candelas	2010-05-20	24 October 1951 –
Johnson Robin Cann	1995-03-09	18 October 1937 –
George Canning	1826-01-12	11 April 1770 – 8 August 1827
George Canning, 1st Baron Garvagh	1810-02-01	15 November 1778 – 20 August 1840
Herbert Graham Cannon	1935-05-16	14 April 1897 – 6 January 1963
John Canton	1750-03-22	31 July 1718 – 22 March 1772
Doreen Cantrell	2011-05-19	
Andrew Cantwell	1738-06-01	– 11 July 1764
Peter Canvane	1765-05-16	c. 1720–1786
Jonathan Cape	1852-06-03	c. 1790 – 9 September 1868
William Capell, 3rd Earl of Essex	1737-11-17	1697 – 8 January 1743
Maurice Antonio de Capeller	1725-04-15	9 June 1685 – 16 September 1769
Pietro Andrea Capello	1744-06-07	fl 1744
Robert Capper	1797-01-26	1767 – 22 April 1851
Domenico Caracciolo	1765-05-23	1715–1789
Giovanni Carafa, Duke of Noia	1759-03-08	? 1715 – 8 July 1768
Francesco d'Aquino, Prince of Caramanico	1783-06-05	1736 – 1795
Joanne Baptista Carbone	1729-11-06	– c. 1750
Giovanni Battista Carburi, Count Carburi	1765-03-21	1722 – ? 1808
Henry Card	1820-03-02	1779 – 4 August 1844
Luca Cardelli	2005-05-26	
Edward Cardwell, Viscount Cardwell	1873-12-18	24 July 1813 – 15 February 1886
John Lawrence Cardy	1991-03-14	19 March 1947 –
James Carkesse	1664-03-23	fl 1657–1675
Richard Carleton	1826-02-09	11 February 1792 – 2 February 1869 Clergyman
Nicholas Carlisle	1814-05-19	? January 1771 – 27 August 1847
Anthony Carlisle	1804-03-08	16 February 1768 – 2 November 1842
Ian Stuart Edward Carmichael	1999-05-13	29 March 1930 – 27 August 2011 Geologist
John Carnac	1772-02-20	1716–1800
James Rivett Carnac	1838-05-03	11 November 1784 – 28 January 1846
Joseph Carne	1818-05-28	17 April 1782 – 12 October 1858
David Carnegie	1799-11-21	22 November 1753 – 25 May 1805
George Carpenter, 2nd Baron Carpenter of Killaghy	1729-06-05	? 1694 – 12 July 1749
Lucy Carpenter	2018-04-16	21 October 1969 –
Henry Cort Harold Carpenter	1918-05-02	7 February 1875 – 13 September 1940
Philip Herbert Carpenter	1885-06-04	7 February 1852 – 21 October 1891
William Benjamin Carpenter	1844-02-01	29 October 1813 – ? 19 November 1885
Joseph Constantine Carpue	1817-02-13	4 May 1764 – 30 January 1846
Robert James Carr	1831-02-24	1774 – 24 April 1841
Thomas William Carr	1815-04-27	– 27 April 1829
William Carr	1727-06-22	– 16 May 1742 MP and Mayor of Newcastle
William Holwell Carr	1806-01-16	1758 – 24 December 1830
Robin Wayne Carrell	2002-05-09	5 April 1936 –
Alan Carrington	1971-03-18	6 January 1934 – 31 August 2013 Chemist
Richard Christopher Carrington	1860-06-07	26 May 1826 – 27 November 1875
Robert Carrington, 2nd Baron Carrington	1839-02-14	16 January 1796 – 17 March 1868
Codrington Edmund Carrington	1800-12-18	22 October 1769 – 28 November 1849
Carron, Count of Briancon	1706-06-05	– 25 October 1709
William Carruthers	1871-06-08	29 May 1830 – 2 June 1922
James Carson	1837-06-01	1772 – 12 August 1843 Liverpool Physician
John Carstairs	1811-03-14	– 1837
Brandon Carter	1981-03-19	1942 –
Frederick William Carter	1932-05-05	16 December 1870 – 29 May 1952
Henry John Carter	1859-06-09	18 August 1813 – 4 May 1895
Philippe Carteret	1665-02-15	24 October 1642 – 28 May 1672
Mary Lucy Cartwright	1947-03-20	17 December 1900 – 3 April 1998
David Edgar Cartwright	1984-03-15	21 October 1926 – 2 December 2015
Edmund Cartwright	1821-04-05	24 April 1743 – 30 October 1823
Samuel Cartwright	1841-02-11	1789 – 10 June 1864
Thomas Cartwright	1716-04-05	1671 – 10 March 1748
Frank Caruso	2018-05-09	1 January 1968 –
Walter Cary	1727-06-22	17 October 1685 – 27 April 1757
Charles, Marquis of Casaux	1780-04-13	– 1795
John Casey	1875-06-03	May 1820 – 3 January 1891
Raymond Casey	1970-03-19	10 October 1917 – 26 April 2016
John Theodore Cash	1887-06-09	16 December 1854 – 30 November 1936
Katharine Cashman	2016-04-29	19 July 1954 – Volcanologist
Roger John Cashmore	1998-05-14	22 August 1944 –
James Macdonald Cassels	1959-03-19	9 September 1924 – 18 October 1994
John William Scott Cassels	1963-03-21	11 July 1922 – 27 July 2015
Lorna Ann Casselton	1999-05-13	18 July 1938 – 14 February 2014
César-François Cassini de Thury	1751-01-17	17 June 1714 – 4 September 1784
Jacques Cassini	1698-03-23	19 February 1677 – 16 April 1756
Jean Dominique Cassini	1672-05-22	8 June 1625 – 14 September 1712
Andrew John Casson	1998-05-14	1943 –
Louis-Bertrand Castel	1730-04-23	11 November 1688 – 11 January 1757
Edmund Castell	1674-04-16	1606–1685
George Castle	1669-02-04	c. 1635 – 12 October 1673 Physician
John Castlecomer, 1st Earl Wandesford	1754-04-04	? 1725 – 12 January 1784
Jacob de Castro Sarmento	1730-02-05	1692 – 14 September 1762
Claude-Nicolas Le Cat	1740-01-31	6 September 1700 – 20 August 1768
David Guthrie Catcheside	1951-03-15	31 May 1907 – 1 June 1994
Michael Elmhirst Cates	2007-05-17	5 May 1961 –
Mark Catesby	1733-04-26	24 March 1683 – 23 December 1749
Edward Provan Cathcart	1920-05-13	18 July 1877 – 18 February 1954 Prof. of Physiology, Univ. of London
Charles Richard Arthur Catlow	2004-05-27	24 April 1947 –
Bruce Macintosh Cattanach	1987-03-19	5 November 1932 – 8 April 2020
Thomas Catton	1821-05-31	1760 – 6 January 1838
James Caulfeild, 1st Earl of Charlemont	1755-05-29	18 August 1728 – 4 August 1799
Wade Toby Caulfeild	1778-04-02	1732 – August 1800
R(obert?) Caumont	1754-05-09	– 1784 French Physician to King of France
Proby Thomas Cautley	1846-04-02	1802 – 25 January 1871
Thomas Cavalier-Smith	1998-05-14	21 October 1942 – 19 March 2021
Tiberius Cavallo	1779-12-09	30 March 1749 – 21 December 1809
Thomas Cave	1778-04-09	22 August 1737 – 31 May 1780 Naturalist
Henry Cavendish	1760-05-01	10 October 1731 – 10 March 1810
Charles Cavendish	1727-06-08	c. 1693 – 28 April 1783
James Cavendish	1719-04-09	c. 1673 – 14 December 1751
Spencer Compton Cavendish, 8th Duke of Devonshire	1892-03-03	23 July 1833 – 24 March 1908
William Cavendish, 1st Duke of Devonshire	1663-05-20	25 January 1641 – 18 August 1707 Original
William Cavendish, 3rd Duke of Devonshire	1748-01-21	1698 – 5 December 1755
William Cavendish, 3rd Earl of Devonshire	1663-05-20	10 October 1617 – 23 November 1684
William Cavendish, 4th Duke of Devonshire	1761-11-12	1720 – ? 2 October 1764
William Cavendish, 7th Duke of Devonshire	1829-12-10	27 April 1808 – 21 December 1891
John Caverhill	1769-02-09	– 1 September 1781
Peter Cawley	2010-05-20	
Arthur Cayley	1852-06-03	16 August 1821 – 26 January 1895
Brownlow Cecil, 9th Earl of Exeter	1767-01-15	21 September 1725 – 26 December 1793
Henry Cecil, 1st Marquess of Exeter	1800-05-08	14 March 1754 – 1 May 1804
James Cecil, 1st Marquess of Salisbury	1784-05-13	1748 – 13 June 1823
Paolo Celesia	1757-06-16	fl 1757
Anders Celsius	1736-01-29	27 November 1701 – 25 April 1744
Gasparo Cerati	1736-02-05	1690–1769
Vincenzo Cerundolo	2018-05-09	20 December 1959 – 7 January 2020
Joseph Cervi	1736-12-09	1663 – 25 January 1748
Joseph Bernard Chabert	1764-05-10	29 February 1724 – 1 December 1805
James Chadwick	1696-07-15	c. 1660 – 11 May 1697 MP for Dover
Peter Chadwick	1977-03-17	Prof. of Mathematics, Univ of East Anglia
James Chadwick	1927-05-12	20 October 1891 – 24 July 1974
Ernst Boris Chain	1949-03-17	19 June 1906 – 12 August 1979
James Challis	1848-06-09	12 December 1803 – 3 December 1882
George Chalmers	1791-05-05	1742 – 31 May 1825
Robert Chaloner	1811-04-04	1776-1846 MP for York 1820-26
William Gilbert Chaloner	1976-03-18	22 November 1928 – 13 October 2016
Arthur Neville Chamberlain	1938-06-16	19 March 1869 – 9 November 1940 Statute
Joseph Chamberlain	1882-12-14	8 July 1836 – 2 July 1914
Edward Chamberlayne	1668-12-03	13 December 1616 – May 1703
John Chamberlayne	1702-05-06	c. 1666 – 2 November 1723
Hugh Chamberlen	1681-04-06	c. 1630 – ? 1720
Charles Chambers	1869-06-03	30 May 1834 – 26 February 1896
Ephraim Chambers	1729-11-06	c. 1680 – 15 May 1740
Richard Dickinson Chambers	1997-05-15	16 March 1935 — 18 April 2019
William Chambers	1776-04-25	1726 – 8 March 1796
William Frederick Chambers	1828-03-13	10 October 1786 – 16 December 1855
Anthony Chamier	1767-05-28	6 October 1725 – 12 October 1780
George Chandler	1833-02-07	c. 1780 – 3 February 1859
John Chandler	1735-02-06	1700 – 12 December 1780 London apothecary
Samuel Chandler	1754-12-05	1693 – 8 May 1766
Sivaramakrishna Chandrasekhar	1983-03-17	6 August 1930 – 8 March 2004
Subrahmanyan Chandrasekhar	1944-03-16	19 October 1910 – 21 August 1995
Francis Legatt Chantrey	1818-04-30	7 April 1781 – 25 November 1841
Jean-Baptiste de La Chapelle	1747-06-18	? 1710–1792
Alfred Chaston Chapman	1920-05-13	24 April 1869 – 17 October 1932 Chemist
David Leonard Chapman	1913-05-01	6 December 1869 – 17 January 1958
Dennis Chapman	1986-03-20	6 May 1927 – 28 October 1999 Biospectroscopist
John James Chapman	1836-04-28	1790–1867 Captain, of Whitby
Stephen Remnant Chapman	1816-11-21	1776 – 6 March 1851 Military Engineer
Sydney Chapman	1919-05-15	29 January 1888 – 16 June 1970
Thomas Chapman	1842-05-26	21 June 1798 – 8 December 1885 of Whitby
Thomas Algernon Chapman	1918-05-02	2 June 1842 – 17 December 1921 Entomologist
Leonard Chappelow	1792-03-15	c. 1744 – 11 September 1820 Clergyman
Jean Chardellou	1702-11-30	c. 1664–1771
John Chardin	1682-11-30	16 November 1643 – 25 December 1712
Charles Frederic, Margrave of Baden-Dourlach	1747-12-10	22 November 1728 – 10 June 1811
Charles II, King of Great Britain and Ireland	1665-01-09	30 May 1630 – 6 February 1686
Charles Philip Arthur George, Prince of Wales	1978-02-09	Royal
Charles Theodore, Elector Palatine of Bavaria	1784-08-12	11 December 1724 – 16 February 1799
Charles William Ferdinand, Prince of Brunswick	1764-01-19	9 October 1735 – 10 November 1806
Brian Charlesworth	1991-03-14	29 April 1945 –
Deborah Charlesworth	2005-05-26	? March 1943 –
Rice Charleton	1748-11-03	1710–1789
Walter Charleton	1663-05-20	1620–1707 Original Fellow
David G. Charlton	2014-04-30	
Henry Marshall Charlton	1994-03-10	
John Charnley	1975-03-20	29 August 1911 – 5 August 1982
Henry Charnock	1976-03-18	25 December 1920 – 27 November 1997
Mark Wayne Chase	2003-05-15	1951 –
Stephen Chase	1724-11-30	– January 1742
Keith Frederick Chater	1995-03-09	23 April 1944 –
Joseph Chatt	1961-03-16	6 November 1914 – 19 May 1994
Frederick Daniel Chattaway	1907-05-02	9 November 1860 – 26 January 1944
Krishna Chatterjee	2017-05-05	1958 –
Arthur Prince Chattock	1920-05-13	14 August 1860 – 1 July 1934
Lewis Andrew de la Chaumette	1826-05-04	1763 – 1 January 1836
Francis Stephen Bennet Francois de Chaumont	1879-06-12	7 April 1833 – 18 April 1888
Charles Chauncey	1741-01-29	30 September 1709 – 25 December 1777 Physician
Anthony Kevin Cheetham	1994-03-10	16 November 1946 –
Richard Chenevix	1801-03-05	c. 1774 – 5 April 1830
Thomas MacFarland Cherry	1954-03-18	21 May 1898 – 21 November 1966
William Cheselden	1711-11-30	19 October 1688 – 10 April 1752
Francis Rawdon Chesney	1834-02-06	16 March 1789 – 30 January 1872
John Hugh Chesters	1969-03-20	16 October 1906 – 14 December 1994
Richard Brown Cheston	1781-03-15	fl 1781
John Chetwode	1776-05-16	1732–1779
Walter Chetwynd	1678-01-31	1 May 1633 – 21 March 1693
John Chevalier	1754-05-23	c. 1730 – 7 March 1789
Thomas Chevalier	1819-02-18	3 November 1767 – 9 June 1824
George Cheyne	1702-03-18	1671 – ? 13 April 1743
William Watson Cheyne	1894-06-07	14 December 1852 – 19 April 1932
Albert Charles Chibnall	1937-05-06	28 January 1894 – 10 January 1988
Mark Sheard Child	1989-03-16	17 August 1937 –
Hugh Culling Eardley Childers	1873-01-16	25 June 1827 – 29 January 1896
John George Children	1807-03-12	18 May 1777 – 1 January 1852
Amos Henry Chilver, Baron Chilver of Cranfield	1982-03-18	30 October 1926 – 8 July 2012
Colin Chisholm	1808-11-24	1755–1825 Army Surgeon, West Indies
Malcolm Harold Chisholm	1990-03-15	15 October 1945 – 20 November 2015
George Cholmondeley, 2nd Earl of Cholmondeley	1715-06-09	c. 1666 – 7 May 1733
Cyrus Chothia	2000-05-11	19 February 1942 – 26 November 2019
Charles Chree	1897-06-03	5 May 1860 – 12 August 1928
Michel Chrétien	2009-05-15	26 March 1936 –
Alexander, Margrave of Brandenburg-Ansbach	1780-02-10	25 February 1736 – 5 January 1806
Christian VII, King of Denmark	1768-09-01	1749 – 13 March 1808 Royal
Christian VIII, King of Denmark	1822-06-06	18 September 1786 – 20 January 1848 Royal
John Wyrill Christian	1975-03-20	10 April 1926 – 27 February 2001
James Robert Christie	1847-03-18	10 February 1814 – 28 February 1879
Samuel Hunter Christie	1826-01-12	22 March 1784 – 24 January 1865
William Henry Mahoney Christie	1881-06-02	1 October 1845 – 22 January 1922
Samuel Rickard Christophers	1926-05-06	27 November 1873 – 19 February 1978
Derman Guy Christopherson	1960-03-24	6 September 1915 – 7 November 2000
Nam-Hai Chua	1988-03-17	8 April 1944 –
Arthur Harry Church	1921-05-12	28 March 1865 – 24 April 1937
Arthur Herbert Church	1888-06-07	2 June 1834 – 31 May 1915
Henry John Spencer Churchill	1832-06-09	22 September 1797 – 2 June 1840
Winston Churchill (Cavalier)	1664-12-28	April 1620 – 26 March 1688
Winston Leonard Spencer Churchill	1941-05-29	30 November 1874 – 24 January 1965
Francis Chute	1743-03-10	– 1745
Giovanni Francesco Cigna	1764-11-22	2 July 1734 – 16 July 1790
Jennifer Alice Clack	2009-05-15	3 November 1947 – 26 March 2020
Alexis Claude Clairaut	1737-10-27	7 May 1713 – 17 May 1765
Arthur Roy Clapham	1959-03-19	24 May 1904 – 18 December 1990
Martin Clare	1735-03-27	– 19 May 1751
Alfred Joseph Clark	1931-05-07	19 August 1885 – 30 July 1941
Andrew Clark	1885-06-04	28 October 1826 – 6 November 1893
Colin Whitcomb Clark	1997-05-15	1931–
Graeme Milbourne Clark	2004-05-27	16 August 1935 –
James Clark	1832-06-09	14 December 1788 – 29 June 1870
James Clark	1799-04-11	– 21 January 1819 Physician in Dominica
Josiah Latimer Clark	1889-06-06	10 March 1822 – 30 October 1898
Robin Jon Hawes Clark	1990-03-15	16 February 1935 – 6 December 2018
William Clark	1836-01-28	5 April 1788 – 15 September 1869 Prof of Anatomy, Cambridge University
William Tierney Clark	1837-05-11	23 August 1783 – 22 September 1852
Alexander Ross Clarke	1862-06-05	17 December 1828 – 11 February 1914
Bryan Campbell Clarke	1982-03-18	24 June 1932 – 27 February 2014
Charles Baron Clarke	1882-06-08	17 June 1832 – 25 August 1906
Charles Mansfield Clarke	1825-06-09	28 May 1782 – 7 September 1857
Cyril Astley Clarke	1970-03-19	22 August 1907 – 21 November 2000
David William Clarke	1998-05-14	
George Sydenham Clarke, Baron Sydenham of Combe	1896-06-04	4 July 1848 – 7 February 1933
Jacob Augustus Lockhart Clarke	1854-06-01	1817 – 25 January 1880
James Stanier Clarke	1792-04-19	? 1765 – 4 October 1834
Jane Clarke	2015-05-01	10 September 1950 –
John Clarke	1986-03-20	10 February 1942 –
John Frederick Clarke	1987-03-19	1 May 1927 – 11 June 2013
Loftus Longueville Tottenham Clarke	1820-05-18	? 1794 – 24 April 1863
Malcolm Roy Clarke	1981-03-19	24 October 1930 – 10 May 2013
Patricia Hannah Clarke	1976-03-18	29 July 1919 – 28 January 2010
Samuel Clarke	1735-04-17	– 1778 of Staffordshire
Samuel Clarke	1728-05-02	– 1767
Thomas Clarke	1754-11-14	1703 – 13 November 1764
Timothy Clarke	1663-04-22	– 11 February 1672 Original Fellow
William Branwhite Clarke	1876-06-01	2 June 1798 – 17 June 1878
William Stanley Clarke	1821-06-07	– c. 1844
Peter John Bell Clarricoats	1990-03-15	6 April 1932 – 17 January 2020
David Charles Clary	1997-05-15	14 January 1953 –
Antoine Jean Francois Claudet	1853-06-02	12 August 1797 – 27 December 1867 French photographer
Walter Clavell	1704-11-30	fl 1704–1740
Douglas Charles Clavering	1824-05-13	fl 1824
John Clayton	1688-11-30	1657 – 23 September 1725
John Clayton	1663-05-20	– c. 1710 Original, Barrister
Nicola Susan Clayton	2010-05-20	22 November 1962 –
Robert Clayton	1744-01-12	1696 – 26 February 1758 Irish bishop
Robert Norman Clayton	1981-03-19	20 March 1930 – 30 December 2017
Richard Clayton	1806-03-20	c. 1745 – 29 April 1828 Barrister
Sarah Cleaveland	2016-04-29	
John Brian Clegg	1999-05-13	
John Cleland	1872-06-06	15 June 1835 – 5 March 1925 Anatomist
George Roger Clemo	1937-05-06	2 August 1889 – 2 March 1983
Andrew Clench	1680-04-01	– 4 January 1692
John Clendinning	1841-02-18	fl 1841
John Clephane	1747-01-08	– ? October 1758
Henry Clerk	1848-06-09	27 December 1821 – 28 February 1913 Army Captain
Dugald Clerk	1908-05-07	31 March 1854 – 12 November 1932
George Clerk	1819-05-27	19 November 1787 – 23 December 1867
John Clerk	1729-10-16	8 November 1676 – 4 October 1755
Henry Clerke	1667-10-24	c. 1622 – 24 March 1687
Thomas Henry Shadwell Clerke	1833-04-18	1792 – 19 April 1849
Robert Clifford	1797-06-01	16 October 1767 – 18 February 1817
William Kingdon Clifford	1874-06-04	4 May 1845 – 3 March 1879
William Clift	1823-05-08	15 February 1775 – 20 June 1849
Clifford Clifton	1667-03-28	June 1626 – June 1670
Francis Clifton	1727-06-22	– 1736
Marshall Waller Clifton	1828-06-05	1 November 1787 – 10 April 1861
Robert Bellamy Clifton	1868-06-04	13 March 1836 – 22 February 1921
Henry Cline	1807-01-15	1750 – 2 January 1827
Henry Pelham-Clinton, 2nd Duke of Newcastle	1747-10-22	24 April 1720 – 22 February 1794
Robert Clive, Baron Clive of Plassey	1768-11-24	29 September 1725 – 22 November 1774
Frederick Geoffrey Nethersole Cloke	2007-05-17	12 April 1953 –
Gideon Marius Clore	2020-04-29	6 June 1955 –
Charles Frederick Arden Close	1919-05-15	(1865–1952) See Arden-Close, Sir Charles Frederick
John Clotworthy, 1st Viscount Massereene	1663-05-20	– 25 September 1665
Thomas Clutterbuck	1676-11-30	c. 1627–1683
Timothy Hugh Clutton-Brock	1993-03-11	13 August 1946 –
Dethlevus Cluverus	1678-11-30	c. 1645 – 21 February 1708
John Flavell Coales	1970-03-19	14 September 1907 – 6 June 1999
John Henry Coates	1985-03-21	26 January 1945 – 9 May 2022
Thomas Spencer Cobbold	1864-06-02	26 May 1828 – 20 March 1886
Antonio Cocchi	1736-02-05	1695 – 1 January 1758
William Cochran	1962-03-15	30 July 1922 – 28 August 2003
George Cock	1666-03-21	– c. April 1679
David John Hugh Cockayne	1999-05-13	19 March 1942 – 22 December 2010
Leonard Cockayne	1912-05-02	7 April 1855 – 8 July 1934
George Cockburn	1820-12-21	22 April 1772 – 19 August 1853
William Cockburn	1696-11-30	1669 – November 1739
John Douglas Cockcroft	1936-05-07	27 May 1897 – 18 September 1967
Christopher Sydney Cockerell	1967-03-16	4 June 1910 – 1 June 1999
Edward Charles Daniel Cocking	1983-03-17	26 September 1931 –
James Cockle	1865-06-01	14 January 1819 – 27 January 1895
Clifford Cocks	2015-05-01	28 December 1950 –
James Cocks	1815-03-09	2 December 1774 –
Reginald Cocks	1799-05-23	14 January 1777 – 19 November 1805
James Cockshutt	1804-12-06	c. 1742 – 29 September 1819
Henry Coddington	1829-02-12	– 3 March 1845
Edward Codrington	1822-11-21	27 April 1770 – 28 April 1851
Enrico Sandro Coen	1998-05-14	29 September 1957 –
John Michael David Coey	2003-05-15	24 February 1945 –
Richard John Cogdell	2007-05-17	4 February 1949 –
Francis Cohen	1821-11-15	See Palgrave, Sir Francis
Julius Berend Cohen	1911-05-04	6 May 1859 – 14 June 1935
Philip Cohen	1984-03-15	22 July 1945 –
Stephen Michael Cohen	2008-05-16	Prof of Biology, Singapore
Sydney Cohen	1978-03-16	18 September 1921 – 25 July 2017
Paul Moritz Cohn	1980-03-20	8 January 1924 – 20 April 2006
Thomas Coke, 1st Earl of Leicester and Viscount Coke	1735-03-27	c. 1695 – 20 April 1759
Ernest George Coker	1916-05-11	26 April 1869 – 9 April 1946
Thomas Frederick Colby	1820-04-13	1 September 1784 – 9 October 1852
Francis Joseph Cole	1926-05-06	3 February 1872 – 27 January 1959
Grenville Arthur James Cole	1917-05-03	21 October 1859 – 21 April 1924
Stewart Thomas Cole	2007-05-17	1955 –
William Willoughby Cole, 3rd Earl of Enniskillen	1829-01-15	25 January 1807 – 12 November 1886
Leonard Colebrook	1945-03-22	2 March 1883 – 29 September 1967
Henry Thomas Colebrooke	1816-02-22	15 June 1765 – 10 March 1837
Josiah Colebrooke	1755-03-13	– 16 August 1775
James Edward Colebrooke	1821-12-20	7 July 1761 – 5 November 1838
Arthur Philemon Coleman	1910-05-05	5 April 1852 – 27 February 1939
Edward Coleman	1831-06-09	1766 – 14 July 1839
William Colenso	1886-06-04	c. 1811 – 10 February 1899
Thomas Colepeper	1668-05-28	25 December 1637 – December 1708 Steward
John Coleridge, 1st Baron Coleridge	1877-05-03	3 December 1820 – 14 June 1894
Bryan Randell Coles	1991-03-14	10 June 1926 – 24 February 1997
Arthur Roderick Collar	1965-03-18	23 February 1908 – 12 February 1986
Philibert Collet	1711-11-30	27 February 1643 – 30 March 1718
Peter Colleton	1677-12-13	c. September 1635 – 24 March 1694
John Norman Collie	1896-06-04	10 September 1859 – 1 November 1942
Charles Collier	1830-02-18	c. 1784 – 6 May 1870 Army Surgeon
James D. Y. Collier	2016-04-29	December 1958 –
John Gordon Collier	1990-03-15	22 January 1935 – 18 November 1995
Charles Collignon	1770-05-03	1725 – 1 October 1785 Physician
John Collinge	2005-05-26	Biochemist, Prof. at UCL
Graham Collingridge	2001-05-10	1 February 1955 –
George Lewis Newnham Collingwood	1819-12-09	c. 1782 – 4 July 1837
Edward Collingwood	1965-03-18	17 January 1900 – 25 October 1970
John Collins	1667-10-17	5 March 1625 – 10 November 1683
Rory Collins	2015-05-01	3 January 1955 –
Peter Collinson	1728-12-05	January 1694 – 11 August 1768
James Collip	1933-05-11	20 November 1892 – 19 June 1965
Peter Colman	2014-04-30	3 April 1944 –
David Colquhoun	1985-03-21	19 July 1936 –
James Nisbet Colquhoun	1830-01-14	23 June 1791 – 17 September 1853 Lt-Col, RA
John Colson	1713-06-11	1680 – 20 January 1760
James William Colvile	1875-04-29	12 January 1810 – 6 December 1880
Daniel Colwall	1663-05-20	– November 1690 Original
John Colwall	1668-05-14	fl 1664–1679
Charles Combe	1776-01-11	23 September 1743 – 18 March 1817
Taylor Combe	1807-03-05	1774 – 7 July 1826
Peter George Le Comber	1992-03-12	20 February 1941 – 9 September 1992
Andrew Ainslie Common	1885-06-04	7 August 1841 – 2 June 1903
Alistair Compston	2016-04-29	Neurologist
William Compston	1987-03-19	19 February 1931 –
James Compton, 3rd Earl of Northampton	1663-05-20	19 August 1622 – 15 December 1681 Original
Spencer Compton, 2nd Marquess of Northampton	1830-05-27	1 January 1790 – 17 January 1851, PRS 1838-1848
Leslie Comrie	1950-03-16	15 August 1893 – 11 December 1950
James Comyn	1760-04-24	– 1778
Charles Marie de La Condamine	1748-12-15	28 January 1701 – 13 February 1774)
John Conduitt	1718-12-01	March 1688 – 23 May 1737
William Congreve	1811-03-28	20 May 1772 – 16 May 1828
Arthur Connell	1855-06-07	30 November 1794 – 31 October 1863
John William Connor	2010-05-20	
Bernard Connor	1695-11-27	c. 1666 – 30 October 1698
Arthur Conolly	1839-02-21	2 July 1807 – ? 17 June 1842
Valentine Conolly	1804-03-15	– 2 December 1819
John Conroy	1891-06-04	16 August 1845 – 15 December 1900 Scientist, Keble College, Oxon
William Constable	1775-05-04	1721 – May 1791
Hayne Constant	1948-03-18	26 September 1904 – 12 January 1968
Antonio Schinella Conti	1715-11-10	22 January 1677 – 6 April 1749
Simon Conway Morris	1990-03-15	6 November 1951 –
Arthur William Conway	1915-05-06	2 October 1875 – 11 July 1950
Edward Joseph Conway	1947-03-20	3 July 1894 – 29 December 1968
Edward Conway, 1st Earl of Conway	1668-01-02	c. 1623 – 11 August 1683
John Horton Conway	1981-03-19	26 December 1937 – 11 April 2020
Gordon Richard Conway	2004-05-27	6 July 1938 –
William Daniel Conybeare	1819-12-09	7 June 1787 – 12 August 1857
Alan Hugh Cook	1969-03-20	2 December 1922 – 23 July 2004
Arthur Herbert Cook	1951-03-15	10 July 1911 – 26 July 1988
Gilbert Cook	1940-03-14	26 October 1885 – 28 August 1951 Prof of Engineering, Kings College
James Cook	1776-02-29	27 October 1728 – 14 February 1779
James Wilfred Cook	1938-03-17	10 December 1900 – 21 October 1975
Stanley Smith Cook	1928-05-10	25 January 1875 – 21 May 1952
Stephen Arthur Cook	1998-05-14	14 December 1939 –
Thomas Cook	1840-06-04	– 11 December 1858
William Richard Joseph Cook	1962-03-15	10 April 1905 – 16 September 1987
Benjamin Cooke	1736-03-11	– 1758 Surgeon
Edward William Cooke	1863-06-04	27 March 1811 – 4 January 1880
George W. Cooke	1969-03-20	6 January 1916 – 10 February 1992
John Cooke	1821-12-06	1756 – 1 January 1838
John Cooksey	1754-04-04	– 1777 Clergyman
Richard Clive Cookson	1968-03-21	27 August 1922 – 17 December 2008
Robin Coombs	1965-03-18	9 January 1921 – 25 January 2006
Andy Cooper	2015-05-01	Professor of Chemistry, Liverpool
Anthony Ashley Cooper, 1st Earl of Shaftesbury	1663-08-05	22 July 1621 – 21 January 1683
Anthony Ashley-Cooper, 5th Earl of Shaftesbury	1785-02-03	17 September 1761 – 14 May 1811
Anthony Ashley Cooper, 4th Earl of Shaftesbury	1754-03-28	10 February 1711 – 27 May 1771
Bransby Blake Cooper	1829-06-18	2 September 1792 – ? 11 August 1853
Charles Purton Cooper	1832-12-06	1793 – 26 March 1873
Edward Joshua Cooper	1853-06-02	May 1798 – 23 April 1863
John Hutton Cooper	1819-05-20	7 December 1765 – 24 December 1828
John Philip Cooper	1977-03-17	16 December 1923 – 18 November 2011
Leslie Hugh Norman Cooper	1964-03-19	17 June 1905 – 20 September 1985
Samuel Cooper	1846-02-05	September 1780 – 2 December 1848 Surgeon PRCS
Astley Paston Cooper	1802-02-18	23 August 1768 – 12 February 1841
William Cooper	1776-04-25	– 10 July 1786 Clergyman
John Mordaunt Cope	1765-06-20	1731 – 7 March 1779
Thomas Copeland	1834-02-06	May 1781 – 19 November 1855
Sydney Copeman	1903-06-11	22 February 1862 – 11 April 1947
James Copland	1833-12-05	November 1791 – 12 July 1870
John Singleton Copley, Baron Lyndhurst	1826-04-13	21 May 1772 – 12 October 1863
Godfrey Copley	1691-11-30	? 1653 – 9 April 1709
Douglas Harold Copp	1971-03-18	16 January 1915 – 17 March 1998
John Copping	1740-11-13	– 1743
John Copplestone	1666-05-09	1623 – 24 August 1689 Clergyman
Francis Corbaux	1834-04-10	c. 1769 – 1 May 1843
Richard Corbet	1665-05-03	September 1640 – 1 August 1683 MP for Shrewsbury
Paul Bruce Corkum	2005-05-26	30 October 1943 – Physicist
Francesco Cornaro	1708-11-30	1670–1734 Venetian Ambassador
Edred John Henry Corner	1955-03-17	12 January 1906 – 14 September 1996
George Washington Corner	1955-04-28	12 December 1889 – 28 September 1981
John Warcup Cornforth	1953-03-19	7 September 1917 – 8 December 2013
Samuel Cornish	1749-03-09	– 30 October 1770
John Corrie	1820-02-17	c. 1769 – 16 August 1839 Clergyman, JP
Francis Edward Corrigan	1995-03-09	10 August 1946 –
Isaac Corry	1811-02-21	1755 – 15 May 1813
Suzanne Cory	1992-03-12	11 March 1942 –
Vernon Ellis Cosslett	1972-03-16	16 June 1908 – 21 November 1990
Emanuel Mendes da Costa	1747-11-26	5 June 1717 – 31 May 1791
Moses da Costa	1737-02-10	– 7 May 1770
Pierre Coste	1742-11-25	27 October 1668 – 24 January 1747
Kevin Costello	2018-05-09	
Roger Cotes	1711-11-30	10 July 1682 – 5 June 1716
Caleb Cotesworth	1718-07-03	– 2 May 1741
James Henry Cotterill	1878-06-06	2 November 1836 – 8 January 1922
Edward Cotton	1663-05-20	c. 1616 – 11 November 1675 Original member
Joseph Cotton	1810-03-15	7 March 1746 – 26 January 1825 Trinity House
Robert Salusbury Cotton	1774-11-24	– c. 1790
William Cotton	1821-05-24	12 September 1786 – 1 December 1866
Alan Howard Cottrell	1955-03-17	17 July 1919 – 15 February 2012 Master of Jesus College
Charles Alfred Coulson	1950-03-16	13 December 1910 – 7 January 1974
George Coupland	2007-05-17	20 December 1959 –
Leonard Francis La Cour	1970-03-19	28 July 1907 – 3 November 1984
Peter Courthope	1668-08-06	fl 1655-1685
John Le Couteur	1843-05-11	21 October 1794 – 24 December 1875
William Maxwell Cowan	1982-03-18	27 September 1931 – 30 June 2002
Russell Paul Cowburn	2010-05-20	
Philip Herbert Cowell	1906-05-03	7 August 1870 – 6 June 1949
Alan Cowey	1988-03-17	28 April 1935 – 19 December 2012
Lennox Cowie	2004-05-27	18 October 1950 –
Alan Herbert Cowley	1988-03-17	29 January 1934 – 2 August 2020
John Lodge Cowley	1768-04-14	c. 1729 – 29 December 1797
John Maxwell Cowley	1979-03-15	19 February 1923 – 18 May 2004
Roger Arthur Cowley	1978-03-16	24 February 1939 – 27 January 2015 Physicist
Stanley William Herbert Cowley	2011-05-19	1947 –
Steven Cowley	2014-04-30	1959 –
Thomas George Cowling	1947-03-20	17 June 1906 – 16 June 1990
Alan Frederick Cowman	2011-05-19	27 December 1954 –
George Nassau Clavering Cowper, 3rd Earl Cowper	1777-02-13	26 August 1738 – 22 December 1789
Peter Leopold Louis Francis Nassau Clavering Cowper, 5th Earl Cowper	1809-05-11	6 May 1778 – 21 July 1837
William Cowper	1699-01-11	c. 1666 – 8 March 1709
William Clavering Cowper, 2nd Earl Cowper	1732-05-11	1709 – 18 September 1764
William Cowper, 1st Earl Cowper	1706-04-03	c. 1665 – 10 October 1723
Brian Cox	2016-04-29	3 March 1968 –
Keith Gordon Cox	1988-03-17	25 April 1933 – 27 August 1998
Leslie Reginald Cox	1950-03-16	22 November 1897 – 5 August 1965
David Roxbee Cox	1973-03-15	15 July 1924 – 18 January 2022
Ernest Gordon Cox	1954-03-18	24 April 1906 – 23 June 1996
William Sands Cox	1836-05-05	1802 – 23 December 1875
Daniel Coxe	1665-03-22	1640 – 19 January 1730
Thomas Coxe	1663-11-04	c. 1640 –
Thomas Coxe	1663-05-20	c. 1615–1685 Original
William Coxe	1782-02-14	7 March 1747 – 8 June 1828
Harold Scott MacDonald Coxeter	1950-03-16	10 February 1907 – 31 March 2003
Francois Gabriel Coyer	1766-03-20	18 November 1707 – 18 July 1782
Robert Crabtree	2018-05-09	17 April 1948 –
Clayton Mordaunt Cracherode	1785-12-15	23 June 1730 – 5 April 1799
David Parker Craig	1968-03-21	23 December 1919 – 1 July 2015
John Craig	1711-11-30	– 11 October 1731
James Craigie	1947-03-20	25 June 1899 – 26 August 1978 Epidemiologist, professor.
John Hubert Craigie	1952-03-20	8 December 1887 – 26 February 1989
Fergus Ian Muirden Craik	16/5/2008	17 April 1935 –
Gabriel Cramer	1749-02-09	31 July 1704 – 4 January 1752
Philip Crampton	1812-04-16	7 June 1777 – 10 June 1858
Morley Benjamin Crane	1947-03-20	17 March 1890 – 17 September 1983
Peter Robert Crane	1998-05-14	18 July 1954 –
Henry Crathorne	1795-04-23	– 6 December 1797
Patrick George Craufurd	1774-06-09	– 1804
John Crawford-Lindsay	1663-05-20	1596–1678 Original member
Adair Crawford	1786-05-11	1748 – 29 July 1795
Andrew Charles Crawford	1990-03-15	12 January 1949 –
Lionel Vivian Crawford	1988-03-17	1932 –
John Crawfurd	1818-05-07	13 July 1783 – 11 May 1868
Michael John Crawley	2002-05-09	1949 –
Jeremiah Cray	1730-10-22	– 23 November 1731
Ettrick William Creak	1885-06-04	28 May 1835 – 3 April 1920 Royal Navy Surveyor
James Creed	1743-02-10	– 7 February 1762
John Creed	1663-12-16	– 1701 Civil servant
Lorenz Florenz Friedrich von Crell	1788-04-03	? 21 January 1744 – 7 June 1816
Henry Cressener	1709-05-04	1683 – 11 February 1710
Daniel Cresswell	1823-11-20	1776 – 21 March 1844
Peter Cresswell	2000-05-11	Immunologist
Augustin Francis Bullock Creuze	1842-12-22	1800 – 23 November 1852
Francis Albert Eley Crew	1939-03-16	2 March 1886 – 26 May 1973
Hungerford Crewe, 3rd Baron Crewe	1841-06-17	10 August 1812 – 3 January 1894
James Crichton-Browne	1883-06-07	29 November 1840 – 31 January 1938
John Crichton-Stuart, 2nd Marquess of Bute	1818-01-08	10 August 1793 – 18 March 1848
Alexander Crichton	1800-05-08	2 December 1763 – 4 June 1856
Francis Harry Compton Crick	1959-03-19	8 June 1916 – 29 July 2004
David George Crighton	1993-03-11	15 November 1942 – 12 April 2000
Richard Stafford Cripps	1948-05-27	24 April 1889 – 21 April 1952
Dennis John Crisp	1968-03-21	29 April 1916 – 18 January 1990
John Crisp	1788-01-17	1788 Deputy Governor, Fort Marlborough
Thomas Crisp	1666-05-23	-–1715 Merchant
Giovanni Francesco Crivelli	1734-01-24	20 September 1690 – 14 February 1743
John Croft	1818-03-05	21 March 1778 – 5 February 1862 Diplomat
Morgan William Crofton	1868-06-04	27 June 1826 – 13 May 1915
Thomas Crofts	1776-06-13	– 8 November 1781
François Boissier de Sauvages de Lacroix		See Sauvages de Lacroix, Francois Boissier
George Croke	1677-02-08	– 17 November 1680
John Wilson Croker	1810-07-05	20 December 1780 – 10 August 1857
James Croll	1876-06-01	2 January 1821 – 15 December 1890
Alexander Crombie	1829-02-05	1762–1840
Leslie Crombie	1973-03-15	10 June 1923 – 3 August 1999
Rookes Evelyn Bell Crompton	1933-05-11	31 May 1845 – 15 February 1940
Andreas Henry de Cronhelm	1725-04-15	fl 1725–1753
William Crookes	1863-06-04	17 June 1832 – 4 April 1919, PRS 1913-1915
William Croone	1663-05-20	15 September 1633 – 12 October 1684 Original
John Crosbie, 2nd Earl of Glandore	1803-02-24	25 May 1752 – 23 October 1815
Charles Frederick Cross	1917-05-03	11 December 1855 – 15 April 1935
George Alan Martin Cross	1984-03-15	27 September 1942 –
Richard Assheton Cross, 1st Viscount Cross	1879-04-03	30 May 1823 – 8 January 1914
Barry Albert Cross	1975-03-20	17 March 1925 – 27 April 1994
John Green Crosse	1836-02-18	6 September 1790 – 9 June 1850
Bernard Crossland	1979-03-15	20 October 1923 – 17 January 2011
Arthur William Crossley	1907-05-02	26 February 1869 – 5 March 1927
Jonathan Andrew Crowcroft	2013-05-02	23 November 1957 –
Richard Anthony Crowther	1993-03-11	26 July 1942 –
John Patrick Croxall	2005-05-26	19 January 1946 –
Francis Rawdon Moira Crozier	1843-12-07	c. 1796 – c. 1848
Durward William John Cruickshank	1979-03-15	7 March 1924 – 13 July 2007
William Cruickshank	1802-06-24	– ? 1811
William Cumberland Cruikshank	1797-06-01	1745 – 27 June 1800
Jodocus Crull	1681-11-23	– ? 1713
Walter Crum	1844-02-29	1796 – 5 May 1867
Michael Joseph Crumpton	1979-03-15	7 June 1929 –
Nicolaus Cruquius	1724-03-12	2 December 1678 – 6 February 1754 Dutch Surveyor
Lewis Crusius	1754-03-07	1701 – 23 May 1775
Samuel Cruwys	1718-12-01	– 1747
William Cubitt	1830-04-01	1785 – 13 October 1861
Ralph Cudworth	1662-03-17	1617 – 26 June 1688
John Leonard Celistus Culhane	1985-03-21	14 October 1937 –
Stuart Graham Cull-Candy	2002-05-09	2 November 1946 –
Alexander Lamb Cullen	1977-03-17	30 April 1920 – 27 December 2013
William Cullen	1777-05-08	15 April 1710 – 5 February 1790
Anthony George Cullis	2004-05-27	16 January 1946 – 9 December 2021
John Cullum	1775-03-02	21 June 1733 – 9 October 1785
Thomas Gery Cullum	1787-04-19	30 November 1741 – 8 September 1831
Alexander Cuming	1720-06-30	c. 1690 – 20 August 1775
Thomas Hovell Thurlow Cumming Bruce, Baron Thurlow	1886-06-10	5 December 1838 – 12 March 1916
James Cumming	1816-01-11	24 October 1777 – 10 November 1861
Antonio Alvares da Cunha	1668-04-09	1626–1690
Daniel John Cunningham	1891-06-04	15 April 1850 – 23 June 1909
David Douglas Cunningham	1889-06-06	29 September 1843 – 31 December 1914
Gordon Herriot Cunningham	1950-03-16	27 August 1892 – 18 July 1962
James Cunningham	1699-12-20	c. 1667–1709 Merchant & Financier
William Cureton	1838-01-25	1808 – 17 June 1864
Thomas Blizard Curling	1850-06-06	1 January 1811 – 4 March 1888
Samuel Crowe Curran	1953-03-19	24 May 1912 – 25 February 1998
Tom Curran	2005-05-26	14 February 1956
Frederick Currey	1858-06-03	19 August 1819 – 8 September 1881 Barrister
George Gilbert Currey	1819-01-28	– 11 December 1822
James Currie	1792-12-20	31 May 1756 – 31 August 1805
Ardaseer Cursetjee	1841-05-27	6 October 1808 – 16 November 1877
David Roderick Curtis	1974-03-21	3 June 1927 – 11 December 2017
William Edward Curtis	1934-05-03	23 October 1889 – 6 May 1969
Sir William Curtius, 1st Baronet Curtius of Sweden	1667-10-03	12 August 1599 – 23 January 1678
George Nathaniel Curzon, 1st Marquess Curzon of Kedleston	1898-12-15	11 January 1859 – 20 March 1925
Stephen A. Cusack	2015-05-01	Molecular Biologist
David Henry Cushing	1977-03-17	14 March 1920 – 14 March 2008
Arthur Robertson Cushny	1907-05-02	7 March 1866 – 25 February 1926
John Cust, 1st Earl Brownlow	1805-05-02	19 August 1779 – 15 September 1853
Edward Cust	1834-02-06	17 March 1794 – 14 January 1878 Bt and MP
Alan William Cuthbert	1982-03-18	7 May 1932 – 27 August 2016
John Cuthbert	1765-06-13	– 14 December 1782 Barrister
Clive Cuthbertson	1914-05-07	29 November 1863 – 16 November 1943
Anne Cutler	2015-05-01	17 January 1945 – Psycholinguistics
John Cutler	1664-11-09	c. 1608 – 15 April 1693
Jack Cuzick	2016-04-29	11 August 1948
Abraham Cyprianus	1700-11-30	c. 1660 – 26 April 1718
Nicola Cyrillo	1727-03-09	12 September 1671 – 2 July 1735
Peter Czernichew	1748-03-10	24 March 1712 – 17 August 1773

== Foreign members ==
=== A ===
Name	Election date	Notes
John Jacob Abel	1938-05-19	19 May 1857 – 26 May 1938
Anatole Abragam	1983-06-30	15 December 1914 – 8 June 2011
Alexei Alekseyevich Abrikosov	2002-05-10	26 June 1928 – 29 March 2017
Walter Sydney Adams	1950-04-27	21 December 1876 – 11 May 1956
Alexander Agassiz	1891-11-26	18 December 1835 – 27 March 1910
Jean Louis Rodolphe Agassiz	1838-12-20	29 May 1807 – 14 December 1873
Bruce Martin Alberts	1993-03-11	14 April 1938 –
Hannes Olof Gosta Alfven	1980-04-24	31 May 1908 – 2 April 1995
Claude Jean Allegre	2003-05-09	31 March 1937 –
Richard Alley	2014-04-30	18 August 1957 –
Emile Hilaire Amagat	1897-03-04	2 January 1841 – 15 February 1915
Edoardo Amaldi	1968-04-25	5 September 1908 – 5 December 1989
Viktor Amazaspovich Ambartsumian	1969-04-24	18 September 1908 – 12 August 1996
André-Marie Ampère	1827-03-08	22 January 1775 – 10 June 1836
Per Oskar Andersen	2002-05-09	12 January 1930 – 17 February 2020
Philip Warren Anderson	1980-04-24	13 December 1923 – 29 March 2020
Anders Jonas Ångström	1870-11-24	13 August 1814 – 21 June 1874
Dominique François Jean Arago	1818-03-12	26 February 1786 – 2 October 1853
Friedrich Wilhelm Argelander	1846-04-23	22 March 1799 – 17 February 1975
Duilio Arigoni	1991-06-20	6 December 1928 – 10 June 2020
Vladimir Igorevich Arnold	1988-06-30	12 June 1937 – 3 June 2010 Mathematician, Moscow
Svante August Arrhenius	1910-06-30	20 February 1859 – 2 October 1927
Kenneth Joseph Arrow	2006-05-18	23 August 1921 – 21 February 2017
Alain Aspect	2015	15 June 1947 French physicist
Karl Frank Austen	2004-05-27	
Arthur Auwers	1879-04-03	12 September 1838 – 24 January 1915
Oswald Theodore Avery	1944-06-15	21 October 1877 – 20 February 1955
Richard Axel	2014-04-30	2 July 1946 –
Julius Axelrod	1979-04-26	30 May 1912 – 29 December 2004

=== B ===
Name	Election date	Notes
Alexander Dallas Bache	1860-05-24	19 July 1806 – 17 February 1867
Jons Oskar Backlund	1911-11-09	28 April 1846 – 29 August 1916
Karl Ernst von Baer	1854-06-15	29 February 1792 – 28 November 1876
Johann Friedrich Wilhelm Adolf von Baeyer	1885-12-10	31 October 1835 – 20 August 1917
Chunli Bai	2014-04-30	26 September 1953 –
Henri Ernest Baillon	1894-04-26	29 November 1827 – 18 July 1895
David Baltimore	1987-06-25	7 March 1938 –
John Bardeen	1973-05-03	23 May 1908 – 30 January 1991
Grigory Isaakovich Barenblatt	2000-05-11	10 July 1927 – 22 June 2018
Barry Barish	2019-04-16	27 January 1936 –
Charles Eugene Barrois	1913-06-26	21 August 1851 – 5 November 1939
Anton Heinrich de Bary	1884-01-31	26 January 1831 – 22 January 1888
Bonnie L. Bassler	2012-04-19	1962–
Felipe Bauza	1819-04-01	20 February 1764 – 3 March 1834
Denis Baylor	2003-05-15	30 January 1940 – 16 M
Zdeněk Bažant	2015	10 December 1937 – Professor of Civil Engineering
George Wells Beadle	1960-04-28	22 October 1903 – 9 June 1989
Jean Baptiste Armand Louis Leonce Elie de Beaumont	1835-06-04	25 September 1798 – 21 September 1874
Alexandre Edmond Becquerel	1888-05-31	24 March 1820 – 11 May 1891
Antoine Cesar Becquerel	1837-04-27	8 March 1788 – 18 January 1878
Antoine Henri Becquerel	1908-06-04	15 December 1852 – 25 August 1908
Martinus Willem Beijerinck	1926-04-29	16 March 1851 – 1 January 1931
Joseph Achille Le Bel	1911-11-09	? 21 January 1847 – 6 August 1930
Pierre-Joseph van Beneden	1875-04-08	19 December 1809 – 8 January 1894
Seymour Benzer	1976-04-08	15 October 1921 – 30 November 2007
Paul Berg	1992-06-18	30 June 1926 –
Claude Bernard	1864-06-09	12 July 1813 – 10 February 1878
Pierre Eugene Marcellin Berthelot	1877-12-13	25 October 1827 – 18 March 1907
Carolyn Bertozzi	2018-05-09	10 October 1966 –
Joseph Louis Francois Bertrand	1875-04-08	11 March 1822 – 2 April 1900
Jons Jakob Berzelius	1813-04-29	29 August 1779 – 7 August 1848
Friedrich Wilhelm Bessel	1825-06-09	22 July 1784 – 17 March 1846
Hans Albrecht Bethe	1957-05-09	2 July 1906 – 6 March 2005
J. Michael Bishop	2008-05-16	22 February 1936 –
Johannes Martin Bijvoet	1972-04-27	23 January 1892 – 4 March 1980
Jean Baptiste Biot	1815-04-06	21 April 1774 – 3 February 1862
Theodor Ludwig Wilhelm Bischoff	1868-03-26	28 October 1807 – 5 December 1882
Vilhelm Friman Koren Bjerknes	1933-05-25	14 March 1862 – 9 April 1951
Henri Marie Ducrotay de Blainville	1832-06-09	12 September 1788 – 1 May 1850
Konrad Emil Bloch	1985-06-27	21 January 1912 – 18 October 2000
Johann Friedrich Blumenbach	1793-04-11	11 May 1752 – 22 January 1840
Niels Henrik David Bohr	1926-04-29	7 October 1885 – 18 November 1962
Emil Heinrich Du Bois-Reymond	1877-12-13	1818–1896
Ludwig Boltzmann	1899-06-01	21 February 1844 – 5 September 1906
Norman Ernest Borlaug	1987-06-25	25 March 1914 – 12 September 2009
Jean Baptiste Edouard Bornet	1910-06-30	2 September 1828 – 18 December 1911
Piet Borst	1986-06-26	5 July 1934 –
Raoul Bott	2005-05-26	1 January 1923 – 19 December 2005
Alexis Bouvard	1826-11-23	27 June 1767 – 7 June 1843
Daniel Bovet	1962-05-03	23 March 1907 – 8 April 1992
Nathaniel Bowditch	1818-03-12	26 March 1773 – ? 17 March 1838
Norman Levi Bowen	1949-05-12	21 June 1887 – 11 September 1956
Albert Brachet	1928-06-21	1 January 1869 – 27 December 1930
Jean Brachet	1966-04-21	19 March 1909 – 10 August 1988
Jean Louis Armand de Quatrefages de Breau	1879-04-03	11 February 1810 – 12 January 1892
Ronald Breslow	2000-05-11	14 March 1931 – 25 October 2017
Edouard Brézin	2006-05-18	1 December 1938 –
Percy Williams Bridgman	1949-05-12	21 April 1882 – 20 August 1961
Wallace Smith Broecker	2007-05-17	29 November 1931 – 18 February 2019
Waldemar Christofer Brogger	1902-11-27	11 November 1851 – 17 February 1940
Louis Cesar Victor Maurice de Broglie, Duc de Broglie	1940-05-23	27 April 1875 – 14 July 1960
Louis Victor Pierre Raymond de Broglie, Duc de Broglie	1953-04-23	15 August 1892 – 19 March 1987
Adolphe Theodore Brongniart	1852-11-25	15 January 1801 – 18 February 1876
Alexandre Brongniart	1825-06-09	6 February 1770 – 7 October 1847
Detlev Wulf Bronk	1948-05-27	13 August 1897 – 17 November 1975
Luitzen Egbertus Jan Brouwer	1948-05-27	28 February 1881 – 2 December 1966
Michael S. Brown	1991-06-20	13 April 1941 –
Leopold von Buch	1828-05-15	26 April 1774 – 4 March 1853
Linda B. Buck	2015	29 January 1947 Physiologist
Margaret Buckingham	2013-05-02	2 March 1945 –
Robert Wilhelm Bunsen	1858-11-25	31 March 1811 – 16 August 1899
Adolf Friedrich Johann Butenandt	1968-04-25	24 March 1903 – 18 January 1995

=== C ===
Name	Election date	Notes
Leon Charles Albert Calmette	1921-05-05	12 July 1863 – 29 October 1933
Melvin Calvin	1959-04-23	8 April 1911 – 8 January 1997
Avelino Corma Canos	2012-04-19	15 December 1951 –
William Wallace Campbell	1918-02-28	11 April 1862 – ? 15 June 1938
Alphonse Louis Pierre Pyramus de Candolle	1869-04-29	? 27 October 1806 – 4 April 1893
Augustin Pyramus de Candolle	1822-04-18	5 February 1778 – 9 September 1841
Stanislao Cannizzaro	1889-12-05	13 July 1826 – 10 May 1910
Walter Bradford Cannon	1939-05-11	19 October 1871 – 2 October 1945
Lennart Axel Edvard Carleson	1993-06-17	18 March 1928 –
Francesco Carlini	1832-06-09	8 January 1783 – 29 August 1862
Élie Joseph Cartan	1947-05-01	9 April 1869 – 6 May 1951
Henri Paul Cartan	1971-04-22	8 July 1904 – 13 August 2008
John Edward Casida	1998-05-14	22 December 1929 – 30 June 2018
Hendrik Brugt Gerhard Casimir	1970-04-23	15 July 1909 – 4 May 2000
Torbjorn Oskar Caspersson	1978-04-20	15 October 1910 – 7 December 1997
Jean Dominique Cassini, Count of Thury	1789-04-30	30 June 1748 – 18 October 1845
William A. Catterall	2008-05-16	12 October 1946 –
Augustin Louis Cauchy	1832-06-09	21 August 1789 – 23 May 1857
Maurice Jules Gaston Corneille Caullery	1948-05-27	5 September 1868 – 13 July 1958
Robert Cava	2016-04-29	1951 –
Luigi Luca Cavalli-Sforza	1992-06-18	25 January 1922 – 31 August 2018
Vint Cerf	2016-04-29	23 June 1943 –
Catherine Jeanne Cesarsky	2005-05-26	24 February 1943 –
Martin Chalfie	2018-05-09	15 January 1947 –
Britton Chance	1981-04-09	24 July 1913 – 16 November 2010
David Chandler	2011-05-19	15 October 1944 – 18 April 2017
Jean Antoine Claude Chaptal	1825-06-09	? 4 June 1756 – 30 July 1832
Michel Chasles	1854-06-15	15 November 1793 – 18 December 1880
Henry Louis Le Chatelier	1913-06-26	8 October 1850 – 17 September 1936
Jean Baptiste Auguste Chauveau	1889-12-05	21 November 1827 – 4 January 1917
Zhu Chen	2013-05-02	17 August 1953 –
Shiing-Shen Chern	1985-06-27	26 October 1911 – 3 December 2004
Michel Eugene Chevreul	1826-11-23	31 August 1786 – 9 April 1889
Joanne Chory	2011-05-19	1955 –
Steven Chu	2014-04-30	28 February 1948 –
Ralph J. Cicerone	2012-04-19	2 May 1943 – 5 November 2016
Rudolph Julius Emmanuel Clausius	1868-03-26	2 January 1822 – 24 August 1888
Hans Clevers	2019-04-16	27 March 1957 –
Alfred Louis Olivier Des Cloizeaux	1875-04-08	17 October 1817 – 6 May 1897
Ernst Julius Cohen	1926-04-29	7 March 1869 – c. 5 March 1944
Ferdinand Julius Cohn	1897-03-04	24 January 1828 – ? 26 June 1898
Kenneth Stewart Cole	1972-04-27	10 July 1900 – 18 April 1984
Francis Sellers Collins	2020-04-29	14 April 1950 –
James Bryant Conant	1941-03-29	27 March 1893 – 11 February 1978
Elias James Corey	1998-05-14	12 July 1928 –
Carl Ferdinand Cori	1950-04-27	5 December 1896 – 19 October 1984
Alfred Marie Cornu	1884-12-18	6 March 1841 – 12 April 1902
Marie Jules Constant Robert Courrier	1953-04-23	6 October 1895 – 13 March 1986
Max Dale Cooper	2017-05-05	31 August 1933 –
Pascale Cossart	2010-05-20	21 March 1948 –
Frank Albert Cotton	1994-06-09	9 April 1930 – 20 February 2007
Luigi Cremona	1879-04-03	7 December 1830 – 10 June 1903
James Watson Cronin	2007-05-17	29 September 1931 – 25 August 2016
James Franklin Crow	2001-05-10	18 January 1916 – 4 January 2012 Geneticist
Paul Josef Crutzen	2006-05-18	3 December 1933 – 28 January 2021
Harvey Williams Cushing	1933-05-25	8 April 1869 – 7 October 1939
Frederic Cuvier	1835-06-04	28 June 1773 – 17 July 1838
Georges Cuvier	1806-04-17	23 August 1769 – 13 May 1832
