= Cecilia (Burney novel) =

Novel by Frances Burney

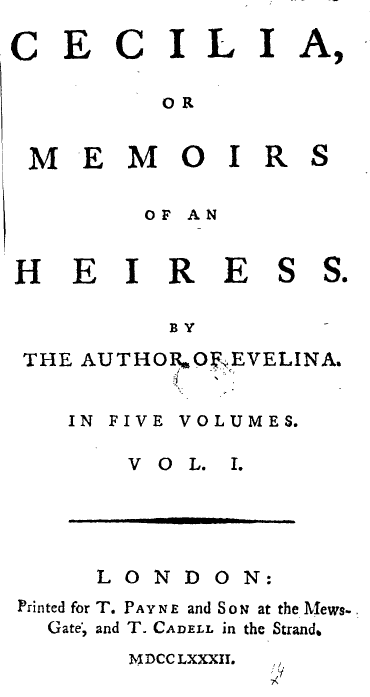
- Title page from the first edition of the first volume of Cecilia
- Author: Frances Burney
- Publication date: July 1782

Cecilia, subtitled (and alternatively titled) Memoirs of an Heiress, is the second novel by English author Frances Burney, set in 1779 and published in 1782. The novel, about the trials and tribulations of a young upper-class woman who must negotiate London society for the first time and who falls in love with a social superior, belongs to the genre of the novel of manners. A panoramic novel of eighteenth-century London, Cecilia was highly successful with at least 51 editions.

== Background ==
Cecilia, or Memoirs of an Heiress was published in July 1782. Frances Burney began working on the novel in 1780, after her father, Dr. Charles Burney, and her literary mentor, Samuel Crisp, suppressed her play entitled The Witlings. Burney's father had concerns that the play, a comedic satire of bluestocking(s), would offend "real people" whom he depended on for artistic patronage, particularly Elizabeth Montagu. This disappointment and the pressure to produce a second novel in order to capitalize on the success of her first work Evelina, seems to have placed considerable strain on Burney, and may have coloured the tone and content of Cecilia. It seems that the Cecilia Stanley of The Witlings became the Cecilia Beverley of Cecilia.

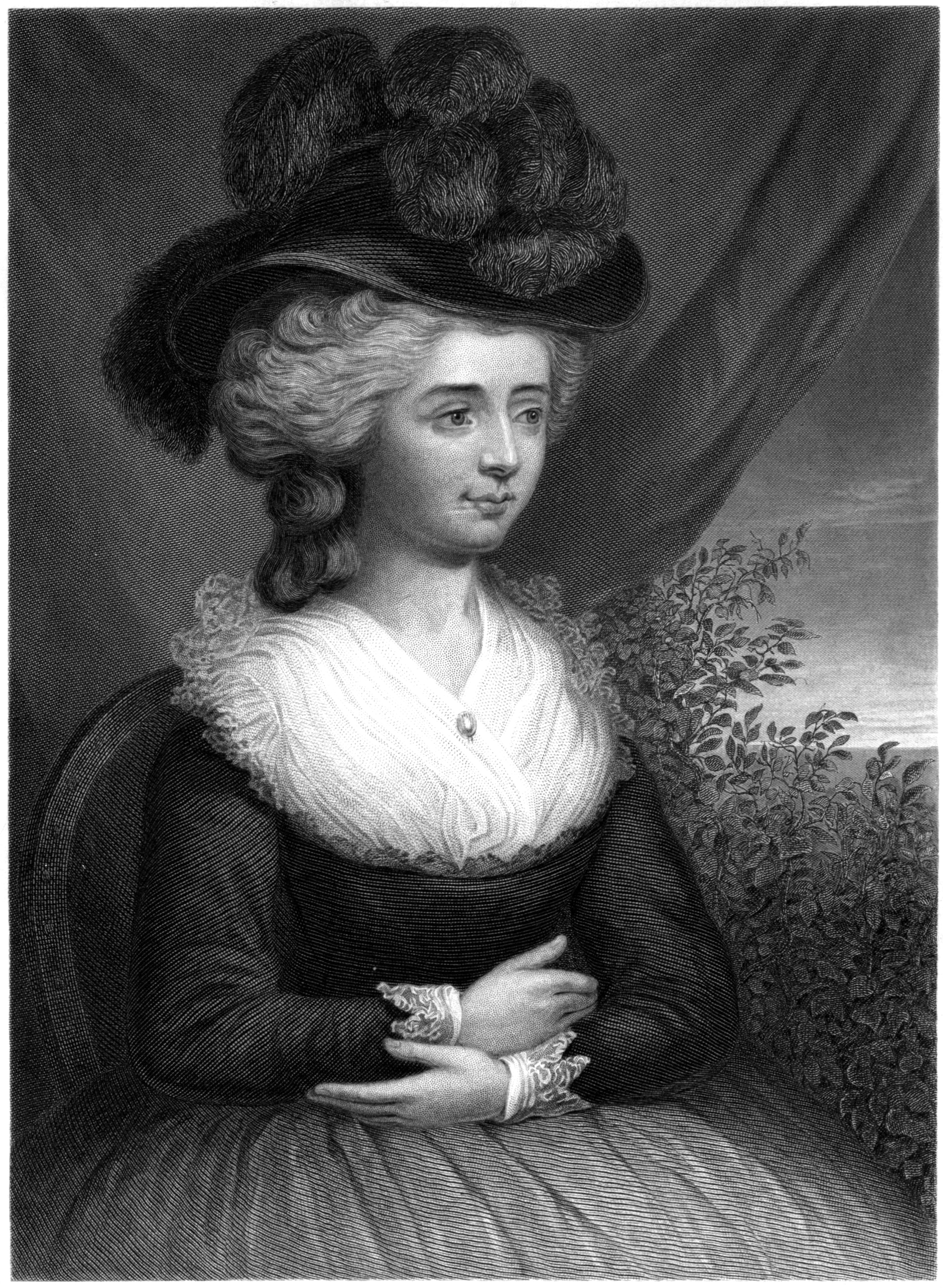
Frances Burney

== Plot ==
Cecilia opens with the beautiful 20-year-old heroine, Cecilia Beverley, saying goodbye to her country home to go on a journey to London. She is an orphan heiress (£3000 a year as soon as she becomes of age, with a smaller personal fortune of £10,000). A stipulation in her uncle's will requires whomever she marries to take her surname, that is, become Mr. Beverley.

Cecilia goes to live with one of her three guardians, Mr. Harrel, but is invited first to her friend Mr. Monckton's house for breakfast. Mr. Monckton has married an old, ugly woman for her money, but secretly regrets his decision after meeting Cecilia—a woman who combines wealth with beauty, youth, and intelligence. Mr. Monckton wants to marry Cecilia as soon as his own wife dies. He is afraid that Cecilia might fall in love or forget him while in London, and warns her continually to be careful of all ‘temptations’. At his house she meets Mr. Morrice, a young lawyer who tries to flatter everyone who is important; Captain Aresby, who likes to compliment ladies in fancy words; and Mr. Belfield, a clever, lively, proud young man who can't settle down. Mr. Monckton's wife and her poor companion, Miss Bennet, who helps Mr. Monckton with his schemes, are also there. Cecilia notes the sharp behaviour of an old man sitting quietly in the corner. She also does not understand why Lady Margaret (Mr. Monckton's wife) dislikes her so much.

Mr. Harrel is the husband of Cecilia's childhood friend, Priscilla. But Cecilia is sad to see that Mrs. Harrel doesn't care about her, and has become silly, worldly, and profligate. On her arrival, Mrs. Harrel presents her to her “friends”, and every day is filled with parties and London amusements which soon tire Cecilia. She sees Captain Aresby and Mr. Morrice again, and is introduced to many people, such as the insolent Sir Robert Floyer, who soon begins to pursue her for her money; Mrs. Harrel's gentle, serious, and shy brother Mr. Arnott, who falls in love with her; the sturdier of characters, Mr. Gosport; the frivolous and very chatty Miss Larolles; and the proud, silent Miss Leeson, but she cannot truly be attached to any of them. Mr. Monckton visits her, and she greets him with a real happiness which delights him.

Cecilia goes to an opera, where she sees the strange, gruff old man, Albany again. He warns her that she is in danger from the people around her, and admonishes her to help the poor before he leaves. The next morning, she sees a poor but honest woman named Mrs. Hill who begs her to help her starving family. Mr. Harrel has neglected to pay her husband for work. Cecilia tries to convince him to pay, but he makes excuses, and finally, Mr. Arnott, feeling sorry for the Hills, lends him the money to pay them.

Cecilia, shocked at the meanness of Mr. Harrel, tries to make arrangements to stay with one of her other guardians, but finds out they are, in different ways, perhaps just as bad: Mr. Harrel is profligate and gambles with his money, her other guardian, Mr. Briggs, is a selfish miser, while Mr. Delvile is a vain man, over-proud of his family name and history.

Meanwhile, Mrs. Harrel holds a masquerade party. At the party, Cecilia is tormented by a black demon who keeps close to her, chasing away anyone who comes near (actually Mr. Monckton in disguise). Someone dressed as a white domino, along with Mr. Arnott, Mr. Gosport, and Mr. Belfield, whom she meets again dressed up as a knight, help her. Cecilia, delighted and mystified by the white domino is surprised at how well he knows the faults of her guardians. She wonders about his identity.

After becoming bored with both solitude and the party atmosphere and frivolities of the Harrels, she decides to join Mrs. Harrel in another outing to the Opera. There, she meets Mr. Belfield who offers to help her out of her seat, but Sir Robert Floyer, pushing rudely by him, tries to help her himself. She refuses him coldly. Furious, he quarrels with Mr. Belfield and they almost duel. Terrified, Cecilia cries out, “Oh stop him!—good God! Will nobody stop him!”—at which a young man rushes up to Sir Robert Floyer and tried to stop him while reassuring Cecilia. Embarrassed and annoyed, Cecilia hurries home and worries over the duel.

The next morning, the same man comes to her telling her that they had dueled: Mr. Belfield has been a little hurt, but Sir Robert Floyer unhurt. Cecilia finds out that he is the white domino she saw at the masquerade party, and also that he is proud Mr. Delvile's son! Soon after, she meets Mrs. Delvile, and is delighted to see that she is a kind, witty, and refreshingly elegant lady, and begins to think of staying with them, instead of with the Harrels. However, she is annoyed to find that Mortimer Delvile (the white domino) first thinks that she is in love with Mr. Belfield, and then seems to think that she is engaged with Sir Robert Floyer. Indeed, Sir Robert Floyer has asked her to marry him, and though she firmly refused him, Mr. Harrel told everyone (including Mr. Delvile) that they will be married soon. Later, she meets Mr. Albany again, who introduces her to a pretty young girl, saying to Cecilia that she should help her. Cecilia finds out, with horror, that Mr. Belfield's wound was really serious, but because he did not have enough money he could not call a doctor. She helps the Belfields, and begins a warm friendship with the girl (Belfield's sister, Henrietta), and also finds out that Mortimer Delvile, too, is helping them. More and more disgusted with Sir Robert Floyer's rude boldness, and the Harrels’ silliness, she stays for a short, but very happy, while with Mrs. Delvile, whom she begins to really love, and Mortimer. However, Mr. Monckton, alarmed at her growing attachment to the Delviles, says bitter lies about them. Cecilia, however, cannot believe him, and she finally realizes she has fallen in love with Mortimer. However, she is displeased to see that he still seems to think she is engaged with Sir Robert Floyer. Meanwhile, Mr. Harrel, threatening her with his own suicide, forces Cecilia to lend him his money for his debts. Cecilia tries hard to warn Mrs. Harrel not to spend money so thoughtlessly, but weak and in denial, she will not listen to her friend.

The next day she goes to Mr. Delvile's house and asks him to help her because Mr. Harrel is of no help in discouraging Sir Robert Floyer's unwanted attentions. Mr. Delvile is suddenly called away, and Mortimer is very greatly excited and surprised when she is announced as a visitor. However, when she meets him again she is surprised and perplexed by his sudden coldness towards her.

Mr. Harrel continues to rack up unpaid gambling debts, and his sudden violent behaviour to his wife frightens Cecilia. He suddenly takes them all to Vauxhall Gardens, where, after drinking, he kisses his wife and then commits suicide shortly thereafter by shooting himself. Cecilia meets Mortimer, and noticing her terror, he feels empathetic accompanying her and Mrs. Harrel to Mrs. Delvile himself. They travel to Delvile Castle, where Cecilia finds Mortimer's behaviour yet more confusing, and Mrs. Delvile makes clear to her that she does not want Cecilia to marry her son. Lady Honoria, a relative of Mrs. Delvile's, comes and teases her about Mortimer. Finally he explains that he cannot marry her, deeply as he loves her, because then he would have to change his name from Delvile to Beverley; and because he cannot bear to see her anymore, he decides to leave the country. Angry and proud, though hurt inside, Cecilia says goodbye to him coolly. When Mrs. Delvile decides to go see her son, Cecilia goes to her old family friend, Mrs. Charlton, and stays with her. While there, Mr. Biddulph, a man who used to like her, and a friend of Mortimer's, sees with surprise that she is embarrassed whenever he talks about his friend, and tells that to Mortimer in a letter: confused, Mortimer decides to see for himself. Lady Honoria plays a trick by stealing Mortimer's dog, Fidel, giving it to Cecilia to tease her. One day, Cecilia, patting the dog, talks to him about her love for Mortimer, and how much she misses him. Meanwhile, Mortimer overhears this entire conversation.

Amazed and delighted to learn that she loves him, and that he had misunderstood her propriety for coldness, he asks her to marry him. She refuses at first even though her love is evident. She becomes very angry when he suggests that they elope. He explains that he is sure that his parents will never, ever allow their marriage, and even though Cecilia is afraid and feels guilty, she says yes. She innocently tells Mr. Monckton about her plans, and furious, he does his best to break them up. He foils their plan. He sends Miss Bennet, Lady Margaret's servant, and his helper, to interrupt the marriage ceremony; and Mrs. Delvile, hearing of it, comes and makes clear to Cecilia that she will never let them marry. Cecilia is very unhappy, but she loves and respects Mrs. Delvile and finally agrees that she will not meet Mortimer. Mortimer, however, insists on seeing her again. Because of this, all three come together for a last meeting. Mortimer, forgetting to be proud, and begs Cecilia to be his wife, and says he doesn't care if he is Mr. Beverley or not: Mrs. Delvile, horrified, suddenly falls so ill that both Mortimer and Cecilia are frightened, and finally decide to do as she says, and never meet each other again. They part.

Mrs. Delvile, after kissing Cecilia goodbye gratefully, leaves as soon as she becomes a little better, and Cecilia is very unhappy. Mr. Albany comes, however, and says that his sadness is greater, and tells his history—how he loved a woman, but she became a prostitute, and after a fight, she died and this made him crazy for three years. Cecilia listens to this bitter story, and decides that she is not really as unhappy as she thinks she is, and hopes, more cheerfully, to help the poor. The next day, however, Mrs. Charlton suddenly dies, and she is again sad and lonely.

She goes to London and fetches Henrietta Belfield. Because she is now old enough to have her fortune, she buys a quiet house in her neighborhood and lives there with her. She is shocked by Mortimer's sudden visit there, and finds out that Mrs. Delvile has said that if she will give up her fortune (then Mortimer will not be Mr. Beverley, but Mr. Delvile), she can marry her son. Mortimer happily says that they can just marry with her personal fortune. Cecilia, horrified, tells him that she has none of her personal fortune left, having lent most of it to Mr. Harrel, and using the rest for other things, such as helping the Hills. Cecilia also finds out that somebody told a half true version of this already to Mr. Delvile. She begins to suspect Mr. Monckton. Mrs. Delvile agrees to the marriage, but Mr. Delvile says so many bad things about Cecilia that they argue, and separate. Cecilia and Mortimer marry quietly and happily.

Two days later, Mrs. Matt, one of the poor people she has helped, tells her who stopped her first wedding—Miss Bennet! Cecilia quickly figures out that the person who sent her must have been Mr. Monckton. She also realizes that he, too, must have been the one who lied so bitterly about her to Mr. Delvile. Shortly after, a servant comes and tells her that Mr. Monckton is dead.

Soon after, Mortimer comes and tells her that he, too, has found out Mr. Monckton's meanness, and he angrily told Mr. Monckton to tell Mr. Delvile the truth about Cecilia. Mr. Monckton just as angrily said no, and they shot each other in a furious fight. Mortimer was safe, but Mr. Monckton, even though he was not dead, was injured. Cecilia tells him to leave England with his mother before she can hear about the fight, and agreeing, he goes. However, her marriage has been heard of, and her fortune is suddenly taken away from her while Mortimer is gone. Confused and unhappy, and now unable to live in the house she bought, she tells Henrietta to live with Mrs. Harrel and Mr. Arnott while she looks for Mortimer, and goes to Mr. Belfield to ask for help; but when she goes there, Mortimer suddenly walks into the room and sees them together.

Angry, surprised, and jealous, he leaves. Cecilia begins to grow crazy. She tries to go to Mr. Delvile for help, but he proudly refuses to see her. At last, some people, thinking she has escaped from an insane asylum, lock her up in a room and write in a newspaper about her. Albany recognizes her, and calls Mortimer to come quickly; Henrietta, too, reads the newspaper, recognizes her, and hurries to see her. Mortimer sees her, and terrified, quickly calls his old friend Dr Lyster to heal Cecilia. Even though she grows more deranged and she is in a fever, she finally regains her sanity, and she and Mortimer apologize to each other and explain what really happened. Mr. Delvile, feeling very guilty when he hears that Cecilia almost died, finally lets her and Mortimer come to his house and see him again. There, they meet Lady Honoria, and Dr. Lyster says his famous speech about pride and prejudice.

In the end, they live happily together, and later, Mrs. Delvile's sister gives Cecilia a lot of money when she dies, so Cecilia can begin helping the poor again with Albany, who is very happy that she did not die. As for the rest of the characters, Mrs. Harrel marries again, and soon begins to have parties and “friends” again; the gentle Mr. Arnott and Henrietta marry; Mr. Belfield still cannot settle down to a job, but finally, with the help of Mortimer, goes into the army and is happy.

== Characters ==
- Cecilia Beverley: an heiress who moves from Bury, Suffolk to London to live with the Harrels. She is described as being very lovely and joins innocence with intelligence. She is open and liberal, and is ever ready and eager to help others and defend justice.
- The Dean: Cecilia's uncle who died shortly before the beginning of the story. He left her an inheritance and arranged for her guardians (none of whom are very well chosen). The inheritance, however, will only be given to Cecilia if her husband consents to take her surname.
- Priscilla Harrel: Cecilia's childhood friend. Cecilia is dismayed to learn that since Mrs. Harrel's marriage and removal to town, she has become a thoughtless, extravagant socialite.
- Mr. Harrel: Mrs. Harrel's husband and one of Cecilia's guardians. He alarms Cecilia by his careless behaviour towards others and his wild spending. Gaming and extravagance bring upon his ruin, and he kills himself at last by suicide.
- Mr. Briggs: one of Cecilia's guardians and a miser. He is described as being short and stocky, and his dialect is some of the most ungrammatical in the whole book.
- Mr. Delvile: one of Cecilia's guardians, notable for his extreme pride. His pompous condescension towards Cecilia mortifies her severely.
- Augusta Delvile: Mr. Delvile's proud but elegant, intelligent and kind wife; she is "not more than fifty years of age", and retains proofs of former loveliness. She is revered by her son, and she and Cecilia develop a strong and mutual regard for each other. Cecilia finds her company refreshing after living with the Harrels
- Mortimer Delvile: The Delviles' son; often referred to as "young Delvile". He is tall and finely formed, and though his features are not handsome, they are full of expression. Cecilia eventually realizes that she loves him, but is uncertain that he returns her affection or that he is as good as he seems. He has strong passions, but has some of his parents' pride which creates a struggling conflict of pride and affection at first.
- Mr. Monckton: an old acquaintance from the country. In his youth, he married the much older Lady Margaret for her money, only to meet the rich, intelligent, and charming Cecilia later. He plays on Cecilia's hopes and fears in an attempt to keep her single until his wife dies and he can marry her. He grows very jealous of Mortimer Delvile when he observes Cecilia's partiality for him, and by disparaging her to the Delviles and trying to prevent their marriage, he does all in his power to break them up. When Mortimer Delvile learns of his shameless perfidy, he is angered to the point of challenging Mr. Monckton to a duel.
- Lady Margaret Monckton: the rich, unpleasant, and elderly wife of Mr. Monckton. She is very jealous of the unsuspicious and innocent Cecilia.
- Sir Robert Floyer: Mr. Harrel's arrogant associate and unwelcome suitor to Cecilia. Mr. Harrel relentlessly promotes the match between Sir Robert and Cecilia, even spreading gossip about it and keeping Sir Robert ignorant of Cecilia's refusal.
- Mr. Belfield: an acquaintance of Mr. Monckton. Despite his potential and honourable nature, he is ruined by his attempts to cover up his humble origins as a tradesman's son.
- Henrietta Belfield: the youngest of Mr. Belfield's sisters. Henrietta and her mother move in with her wounded brother and through Albany, is befriended by Cecilia. She is sweet tempered, grateful, and amiable, and adores Cecilia. She secretly cherishes a hopeless passion for Mortimer Delvile. She later marries the gentle Mr. Arnott.
- Mrs. Belfield: Mr. Belfield's mother and the widow of a shopkeeper. She is a coarse woman who spoils her son, often to the exclusion of her daughter, and angers Cecilia by her brazen suggestions of marrying her son.
- Mrs. Hill: a poor but honest woman whose husband was Mr. Harrel's carpenter. Her son Billy died before her first appearance in the story and her husband has been fatally injured while working for Mr. Harrel, leaving Mrs. Hill and her young daughters to perform hard labour and nearly starve to death. When Cecilia learns that Mr. Harrel has refused to honour his debt to the Hills, she comes to the family's aid.
- Albany: an older man who makes speeches against the uncharitable use of riches - "his friends call him the 'moralist'; the young ladies, the 'crazy-man'; the maccaronis, the 'bore'; in short, he is called by any and every name but his own."
- Mr. Arnott: Mrs. Harrel's brother. He is in love with Cecilia and will do just about anything to win her good opinion but has little hope of her returning his affection. Cecilia cannot return his love, but values his gentle and amiable qualities and is shocked when they are taken advantage of by Mr. Harrel.
- Mr. Marriot: a wealthy but "simple" young man with Cecilia dances at the Harrels' ball. Mr. Harrel uses his attraction for Cecilia in an attempt to raise money.
- Mr. Gosport: an older man and studier of absurd characters. He often appears to instruct Cecilia in the ways of the Ton (the upper-class trendsetters of London society of the era).
- Captain Aresby: an overly gallant officer that Cecilia first meets at the Monckton's. Mr. Gosport classifies him as part of Jargonist sect of the Ton, due to his pretentious use of fashionable jargon.
- Miss Larolles: a leader of the Voluble sect of the Ton (according to Mr. Gosport's classification).
- Miss Leeson: a leader of the Supercilious sect of the Ton. Cecilia is mortified by her failure at conversation with her.
- Mr. Meadows: a leader of the Insensibilist sect of the Ton, who strives to find everything dull.
- Mr. Morrice: a sycophant whom Cecilia meets at the Moncktons'. He abuses his very slight acquaintance with Cecilia to visit her at the Harrels', and is probably used by Mr. Monckton to try to prevent Cecilia's marriage.
- Mr. Hobson and Mr. Simkins: two of Mr. Harrel's creditors, introduced at the Vauxhall scene. Mr. Hobson is more financially settled and less respectful towards the upper class, while Mr. Simkins is less settled and more servile.
- Lady Honoria Pemberton: a relative of the Delviles, whom Cecilia meets during her stay at Delvile Castle. She is quick and very high-spirited, but without discretion or delicacy for others, and often torments Cecilia with her thoughtless remarks and arch raillery. She enjoys infuriating the haughty Mr. Delvile by giddy remarks on his castle, such as calling it a jail.
- Mrs. Charlton: a generous and extremely kind-hearted old woman, who was an old friend of Cecilia's. She is not very bright or quick, but has an excellent heart, an amiable disposition, and a very sweet temper. She has two narrow-minded and rapacious granddaughters, both single, whom she loves dearly; however, her excessive fondness for Cecilia is superior even to the affection she cherishes for them. Cecilia, in return, looks up to her as a mother and a friend. Though Cecilia is little assisted by her counsel, she is always sure of Mrs. Charlton's ready sympathy, and is greatly shocked and saddened by her death.

== Publishing history ==
Burney spent about a year and a half, starting in 1780, composing Cecilia while staying at the home of family friend Samuel Crisp. Burney then spent six months copying, correcting and proofing the draft and the book was published in 1782, the same year as her father's second volume of the General History of Music. According to what can be inferred from her letters, Burney wrote under tremendous anxiety and familial pressure, but Crisp's home provided a respite and he highly encouraged her work. A highly successful novel, Cecilia went through 51 known editions, and there were at least 25 international editions in places such as the US, Belgium, Germany, Ireland, Sweden and Russia during Burney's own lifetime. The first and subsequent editions of Cecilia sold out quickly and at Burney's death in 1828, there were 27 editions.

== Critical reception ==
Burney's work raised women's writing to a higher level of critical approbation. Cecilia, her second novel, is twice as long as the first, Evelina. Burney switched from the epistolary style to the third person and her use of free indirect discourse, also called free indirect speech reveals characters more intimately, creating a more expansive range of the social fabric of eighteenth-century London.

Although she is often compared to Jane Austen, Burney's tone is much darker and serious. In Burney's novels, the heroine is tested by the hero and has to prove her worth, and marriage does not guarantee a fairytale happy ending. Burney's heroines are female counterparts to the male picaro and are described as "liminal" characters, orphans or youths, who must stake out their identity in a world of social obstacles. The highly emotional tone and the bizarre events in Cecilia have "disturbed" some critics and readers while others recognize these as among Burney's unique authorial merits.

== Literary allusions ==
Jane Austen referred to Cecilia and other novels in her novel, Northanger Abbey: “'And what are you reading, Miss — ?' 'Oh! It is only a novel!' replies the young lady, while she lays down her book with affected indifference, or momentary shame. 'It is only Cecilia, or Camilla, or Belinda'; or, in short, only some work in which the greatest powers of the mind are displayed, in which the most thorough knowledge of human nature, the happiest delineation of its varieties, the liveliest effusions of wit and humour, are conveyed to the world in the best–chosen language."

The title of Austen's Pride and Prejudice may have been inspired by a passage at the end of Cecilia: “remember: if to pride and prejudice you owe your miseries, so wonderfully is good and evil balanced, that to pride and prejudice you will also owe their termination.”

In Persuasion, Anne Elliot alludes to "the inimitable Miss Larolles".

In Thackeray's Vanity Fair, Rebecca Sharp writes to Amelia Sedley and says they "used to read Cecilia at Chiswick".

Burney often combined comedy and tragedy and her works contain some of the darker elements of Shakespearean characters such as Prince Hamlet or King Lear. In Cecilia, Burney quotes or references Romeo and Juliet, Hamlet, Macbeth, King Lear, Henry IV Part 1, and The Merchant of Venice.

== Sources ==
Klekar, Cynthia. “‘Her Gift was Compelled’: Gender and the Failure of the ‘Gift’ in Cecilia.” Eighteenth-Century Fiction 18, no. 1 (Fall 2005): 177–94.
