= Lemierre =

Lemierre is a surname. Notable people with the surname include:

- André Lemierre (1875–1956), French bacteriologist
- Antoine-Marin Lemierre (1733–1793), French dramatist and poet
- Auguste-Jacques Lemierre d'Argy (1762–1815), French writer and translator, nephew of Antoine-Marin
