= The Wanderer (Burney novel) =

1814 novel by Frances Burney

The Wanderer; or, Female Difficulties
- Author: Frances Burney
- Language: English
- Publisher: Longman, Hurst, Rees, Orme, and Brown
- Publication date: 28 March 1814
- Publication place: London, England, United Kingdom
- Media type: Hardcover
- Pages: 443 (volume I), 458 (volume II), 438 (volume III), 359 (volume IV), 395 (volume V)
- OCLC: 1015495808

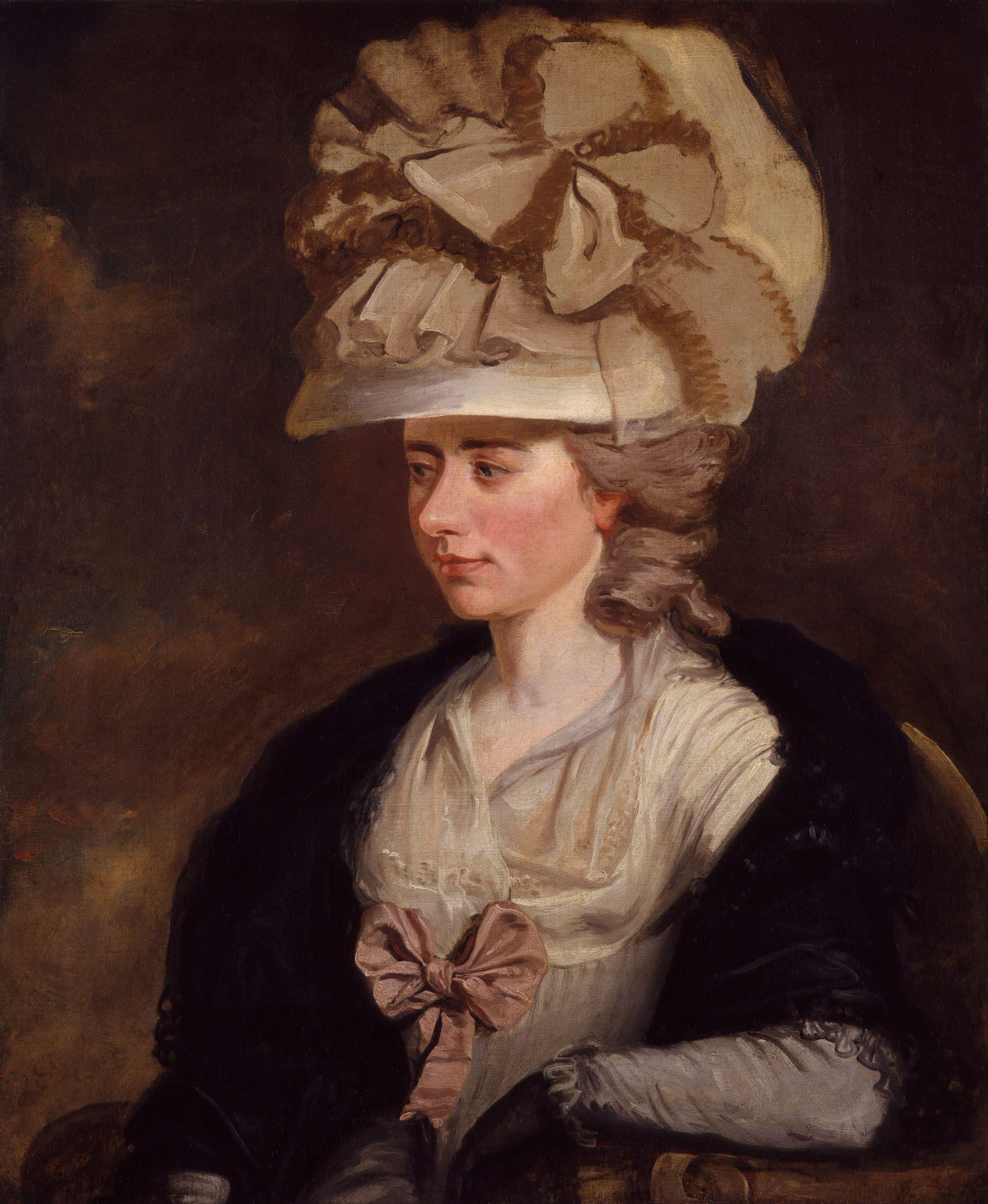
Frances Burney's (1752–1840) last novel before The Wanderer was Camilla, published eighteen years earlier in 1796.

The Wanderer; or, Female Difficulties is Frances Burney’s last novel. Published on 28 March 1814 by Longman, Hurst, Rees, Orme and Brown, this historical novel with Gothic overtones set during the 1790s tells the story of a mysterious woman who attempts to support herself while hiding her identity. The novel focuses on the difficulties faced by women as they strive for economic and social independence.

Begun in the 1790s, the novel took Burney fourteen years to complete. She worked on it sporadically while she wrote plays and was an exile in France. Although the first edition sold out on the strength of Burney's reputation, the scathing reviews of the novel caused it to sell poorly. Reviewers disliked its portrayal of women and its criticism of British society.

== Composition ==
Burney spent fourteen years writing The Wanderer—the longest amount of time she spent writing any of her works. She began the novel in the late 1790s, after finishing Camilla, but stopped, deciding to write plays, which were more profitable. In 1801, Burney's husband, General Alexandre-Jean-Baptiste Piochard D'Arblay, returned to his home country of France and tried to acquire a commission in the French army that would not require him to fight the British. He was unsuccessful and could not then leave France without raising the suspicions of the government, so Burney joined him in April 1802. The French Revolutionary and Napoleonic Wars, which had halted briefly, resumed and Burney was forced to spend ten years as an exile in France. While there, she worked on a draft of The Wanderer; however, no manuscript of the novel exists, so it is impossible to track the exact progress of the novel.

In 1812, Burney left France with her son on the Mary Anne, ostensibly to go to the United States; in actuality, she intended to return to England. The ship illegally docked in England and was detained, making Burney and a few other passengers nominally prisoners. Burney had not originally intended to work on the novel while in England, but during a long wait for her ship at Dunkirk, she had decided to continue working on it. Burney's husband sent her the manuscript there, to do which he had to promise the French government that "upon his Honour...the Work had nothing in it political, nor even National...possibly offensive to the Government". The customs officer, however, was enraged that the manuscript had been sent. According to Burney, he "began a rant of indignation & amazement, at a sight so unexpected & prohibited...He sputtered at the Mouth, & stamped with his feet". He accused Burney of being a traitor; Burney herself believed that without the help of an English merchant at the time, her manuscript would have been destroyed. However, in her Dedication Burney gave a completely opposite account, no doubt to avoid any difficulties for her husband in France.

== Plot and themes ==
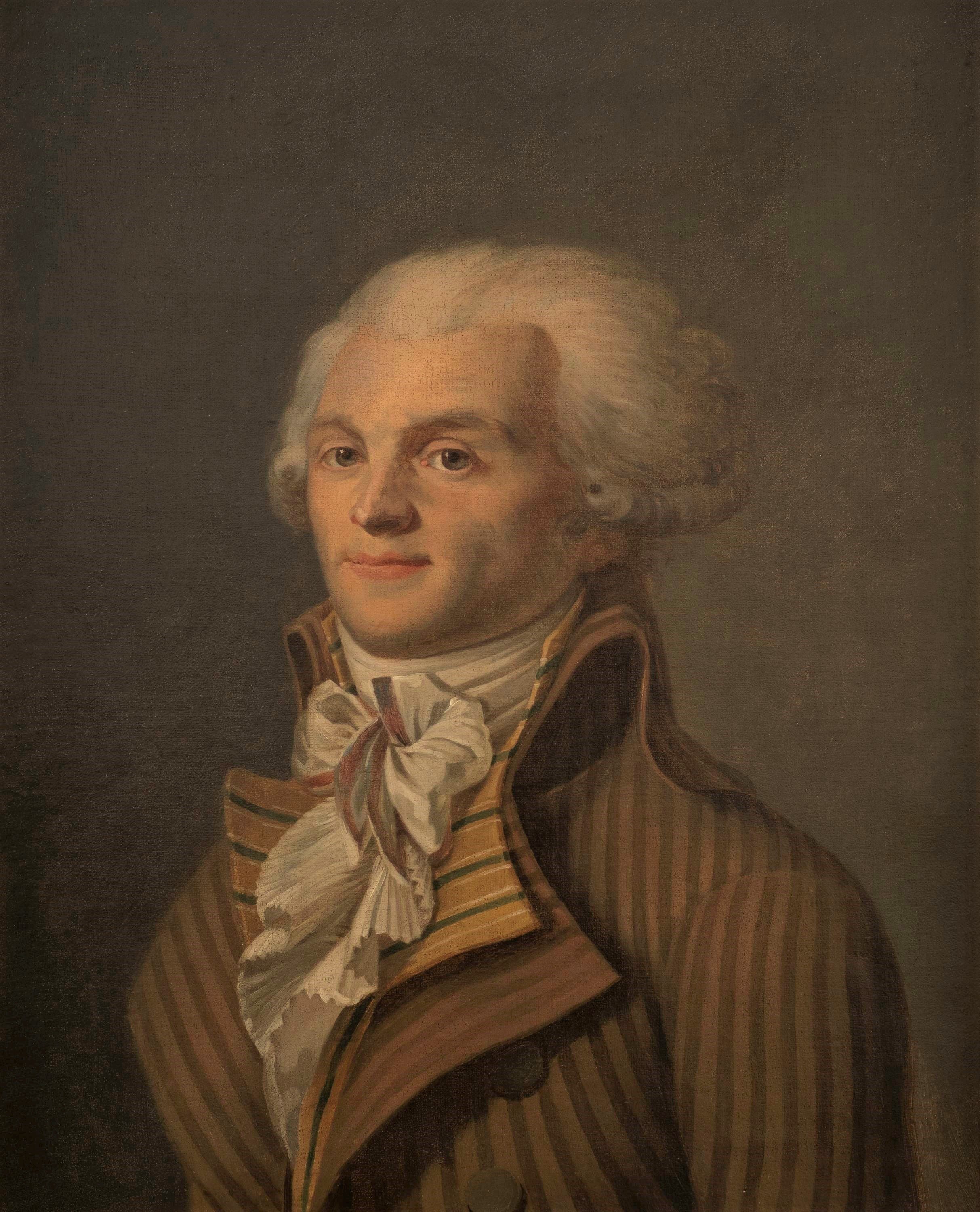
The Wanderer is set during the Reign of Terror, exemplified by the rise and fall of Maximilien Robespierre.

The Wanderer opens with a group of people fleeing the Terror. Among them is the protagonist, who refuses to identify herself. No one can place her socially—even her nationality and race are in doubt. As Burney scholar Margaret Doody explains, "the heroine thus arrives [in England] as a nameless Everywoman: both black and white, both Eastern and Western, both high and low, both English and French." She asks for help from the group, but because she knows no one, she is refused.

The protagonist, later identified as Juliet Granville, tries to become self-sufficient, but her story reveals the “difficulties” of a woman in her friendless situation. Women take advantage of her economically and men importune her. She is “a woman totally dispossessed by political events”. Miss Arbe, for example, takes control of Juliet's life and her money (although inexpertly); she also attempts to organise a ladies committee, becoming "a comic spectacle of political life". Specifically, Burney compares Miss Arbe to Robespierre: as Doody explains, "the arrangements of both become swallowed in egotism, are highly disorganized if impetuously directed, and are bound to end in failure". Throughout The Wanderer, Burney comments on the tyrannical hold that the rich have over the poor in England, showing how the wealthy will accept music lessons from Juliet but refuse to pay for them, placing her in a desperate situation. She also charts the downward spiral of Juliet from gentility to working woman; she begins as a musician and slips into the less-reputable positions of milliner and seamstress. In her cross-class analysis of the problems of women, Burney was probably influenced by Mary Wollstonecraft's Maria: or, The Wrongs of Woman (1798). However, according to Doody, "Burney is the first novelist seriously to express sympathy for the working women in their normal conditions of work—and to see how the system of employment, not merely individual bad employers, creates conditions of impossible monotony."

Elinor Joddrel is the antagonist of the story. She controls her own destiny, largely because she is an umarried heiress, and articulates "feminist views on the economic and sexual oppression of women". During the 1790s, novelists often portrayed feminist characters, sometimes as heroines, such as in Mary Hays’s Memoirs of Emma Courtney (1796), but more frequently as "grotesque satires" as in Elizabeth Hamilton’s Memoirs of Modern Philosophers (1800). In the character of Elinor, Justine Crump argues in her article on the novel for The Literary Encyclopedia, Burney represents feminist arguments, but she does not either explicitly criticise or endorse them. Doody, however, contends that Burney endorses Elinor's feminist arguments because no character contradicts them and Juliet appears to agree with them. When the two discuss women's issues, Juliet does not dispute Elinor's point of view, she adds more points to her argument.

Elinor falls hopelessly in love with Harleigh, the brother of her fiancé and a suitor of Juliet's. Harleigh is uncertain whether he should propose to Juliet, as he knows nothing of her family and she earns money by giving young ladies music lesson and instruction on the harp. After Harleigh rejects her, Elinor “abandons decorum altogether”; she dresses up as a man and frightens Juliet with her threats of suicide. It is Harleigh who discovers Juliet's true identity—she is the daughter of a "clandestine" marriage of the Earl of Granville. She was raised in France and forced to marry a revolutionary to save her guardian from the guillotine. Juliet fled the marriage, but her husband pursued her, believing that she would inherit the Granville fortune. The Granville family know of her predicament, but refuse to help her. Harleigh abandons Juliet after discovering that she is married. She is eventually rescued by a friend. In the end, Juliet's husband is deported and executed as a spy; her guardian comes to England, thereby granting her respectability and her inheritance. Harleigh returns and proposes. Finally, “Elinor is brought to repudiate, if not her feminist principles, at least her suicidal intentions, and order is restored to the novel”. However, as Doody explains, "Burney gives us the 'happy ending' of course, but not until after she has made sure that we see it is just a formality, and by no means a solution." The reader cares little for Juliet's marriage to Harleigh and recognises instead that she has become a commodity.

The love triangle between Harleigh, Elinor, and Juliet suggests that Elinor should be a villainess who disrupts the happy love of Harleigh and Juliet, however the characterisations of both Elinor and Harleigh challenge this assumption. Harleigh is a "very passive and fussy person", and as Doody argues, "he does not satisfy our ideas of the 'hero' of a love story—who ought to be handsome, dashing, strong, and courageous, if a trifle self-willed." His purpose in the novel is to mark out what is respectable and proper, claiming that Juliet should not perform her music in public nor should she profit monetarily from it. Juliet's defence of her performances to Harleigh mirror Burney's own defence of playwriting to her father, Charles Burney, who strongly disapproved. Harleigh is named after Henry Mackenzie's Harley in The Man of Feeling (1771) and reminiscent of him—a hero of "sentiment and delicacy".

== Genre ==
The Wanderer is a historical novel, part of a new genre that was a response to the French Revolution. During the 1790s and early 19th century, novelists examined the past using fiction. Charlotte Smith analysed the revolution in Desmond (1792) and The Banished Man (1794) while Jane West's The Loyalists looked at the English Civil War. Sir Walter Scott's Waverley (1814) was published the same year as The Wanderer. Although the novel is set during 1793–94, "the dire reign of the terrific Robespierre", Burney does not fill the text with references to specific historical events. Neither Louis XVI nor Marie Antoinette are mentioned in the novel, for example.

The Wanderer also draws on the conventions of Gothic fiction, specifically "mystery and concealment, spying and flight". Like Ann Radcliffe's The Romance of the Forest (1791), the heroine of The Wanderer is unknown and in need of sympathy at the beginning of the story. Throughout the story, the heroine's name is consistently concealed and later only half-revealed.

== Publication and reception ==
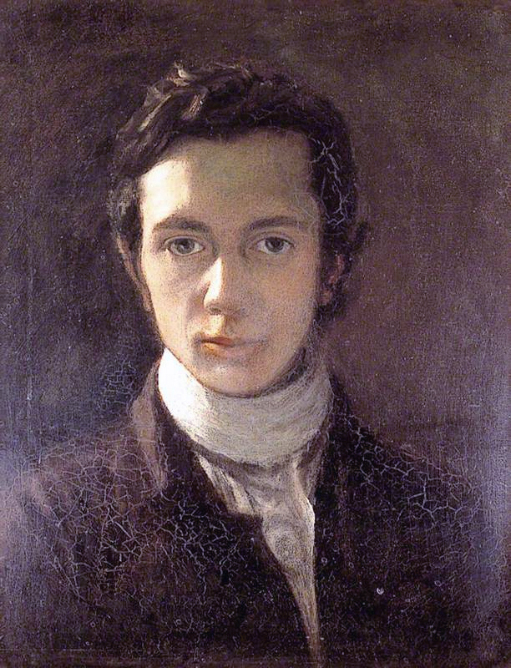
Critic William Hazlitt's harsh review of The Wanderer helped turn public opinion against it.

The Wanderer was published in five volumes by Longman, Hurst, Rees, Orme and Brown on 28 March 1814. Burney was one of the most popular novelists in Britain at the beginning of the 19th century, but she had not published a novel since 1796. The Wanderer was greatly anticipated and Longman printed a large first edition of 3,000 copies. All of these copies were sold to booksellers before the novel's actual release. Believing the novel would be a best-seller, they issued a second edition of 1,000 copies on 15 April 1814 and planned three additional ones. However, compared to Burney's earlier novels, The Wanderer was not a success. Only 461 copies of the second edition were sold during 1814 and over the next ten years, only 74. The leftovers were pulped.

The Wanderer was translated into French by Jean-Baptiste Joseph Breton de la Martinière and Auguste-Jacques Lemierre d'Argy under the title La Femme errante and published in Paris in 1814; Burney described the translation as "abominable". A three-volume American edition was published in New York in 1814. No other editions were published until Pandora Press's 1988 reissue.

The Wanderer received unfavourable reviews, "with one or two quite damning", which may have seriously affected its sales. Reviewers argued that Burney's earlier novels had been better; The Wanderer was improbable and the language was "prolix and obscure". They were also taken aback by its criticism of British society at a time when the country was celebrating its victory over Napoleon. The negative reviews were published quickly (for the 19th century): two hostile reviews appeared in April 1814; a genuinely favourable review did not appear until April 1815. Critic William Hazlitt, in particular, complained in the Edinburgh Review about the novel's focus on women: “The difficulties in which [Burney] involves her heroines are indeed, ‘Female Difficulties;’ – they are difficulties created out of nothing.” According to Hazlitt, women did not have problems that could be made into interesting fiction. The reviewer for the British Critic found the character of Elinor distasteful and guided readers to Hamilton's more conservative Memoirs of Modern Philosophers. Since the 1980s, The Wanderer, along with Burney's other works, has become the focus of serious scholarship and is popular among students.

== Bibliography ==
- Crump, Justine. "The Wanderer, or, Female Difficulties". The Literary Encyclopedia (subscription required). 29 February 2004. Retrieved 29 January 2009.
- Doody, Margaret Anne. "Introduction" and "Note on the text". The Wanderer. Oxford: Oxford University Press, 2001. ISBN 0-19-283758-3.
