= Belinda (Edgeworth novel) =

1801 novel by Maria Edgeworth

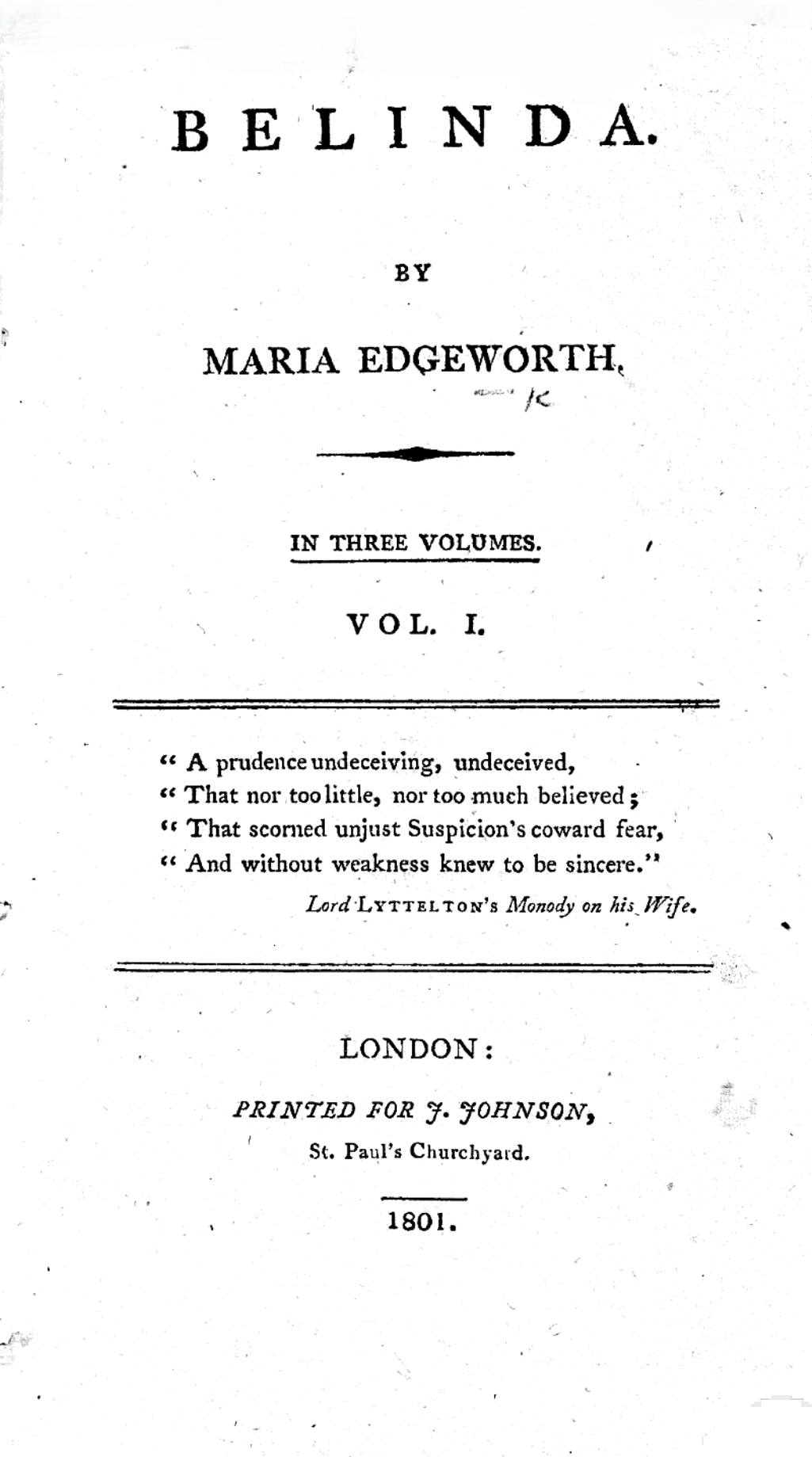
- Title page of first edition
- Author: Maria Edgeworth
- Language: English
- Genre: Novel
- Publisher: Joseph Johnson
- Publication date: 6 June 1801
- Publication place: United Kingdom
- Media type: Print (Hardback & Paperback)

Belinda is an 1801 novel by the Anglo-Irish writer Maria Edgeworth. It was first published in three volumes by Joseph Johnson of London. The novel was Edgeworth's second published, and was considered controversial in its day for its depiction of an interracial marriage. It was reprinted by Pandora Press in 1986.

In its first (1801) and second (1802) editions, Juba, a Black servant, marries an English farmgirl named Lucy. The third edition of the book, published in 1810, omitted the character Juba, and instead has Lucy betrothed to one James Jackson. Also, in the first two editions, Belinda almost marries Mr. Vincent, a rich West Indian Creole; in the 1810 edition, Belinda only esteems him and never agrees to marry him. It has been argued that this change came at the insistence of Edgeworth's father, rather than the author herself, because he edited several of her works after their publication.

== Synopsis ==
Belinda is a young lady who lives with her aunt, Mrs. Stanhope. Being unwed, Belinda is sent to live with Lady Delacour, whom Belinda considers fascinating and charming. Lady Delacour believes herself to be dying of breast cancer. She hides her emotional distress caused by her impending death and poor relationships with her family from Belinda through wit and charm. The first half of the novel is concerned with the blooming friendship between Belinda and Lady Delacour, which is broken by Lady Delacour's fear that Belinda plans to marry Lord Delacour, as expressed in the line, "I see...that she [Belinda] who I thought had the noblest of souls has the meanest! I see that she is incapable of feeling."

Belinda subsequently moves to the home of the Percival family, the embodiment of the ideal family. Once Lady Delacour seeks treatment for her illness, Belinda returns to support her. Upon her visit to the doctor, Lady Delacour discovers her disease is not terminal and reconciles herself with Belinda. She eventually makes a full recovery from her illness.

== Main characters ==
Lady Delacour: A fashionable bel esprit (woman of wit), who Belinda at first considers "the most agreeable—no, that is too feeble an expression—the most fascinating person she had ever beheld". Later, however, after Belinda hears her unhappy history, she feels "astonishment—pity—admiration—and contempt". She is very kind and considerate to Lady Delacour, who begins to feel affectionate towards her. Through Belinda's gentleness, Lady Delacour begins to be kinder to her husband, and grows warmer towards her daughter Helena. However, Lady Delacour's sudden jealousy towards Belinda makes Belinda part with her and go to the Percivals' house, where Helena had formerly been staying. Later, Lady Delacour finds out that she had absolutely no foundation for her jealousy, and being very ill, begs Belinda to come back to her. Belinda rejoins her, and now contrite and humbled, Lady Delacour takes Belinda's advice and reconciles with her husband – even telling him about her mysterious history and her fears that she has cancer. Lord Delacour is affectionately concerned. She goes to obtain surgery, and is told that she has not cancer at all! The quack doctor she had been going to in her desperation had given her certain medicines to increase her pain and agitation, to feed her fears. Joyfully, she decides to cast aside her folly and dissipation, and uses her talents energetically to be a good wife, a fervent friend, and a kind mother, and she ends the book by saying laughingly, "Now, Lady Delacour, to show that she is reformed, comes forward to address the audience with a moral—a moral!—yes,

Our tale contains a moral, and no doubt,
You all have wit enough to find it out."

Her strong character and the very important part she plays in the novel make some critics think the book should bear her name instead of Belinda's.

Belinda Portman: a young lady of about seventeen, "handsome, graceful, sprightly, and highly accomplished". She has excellent abilities, but is unused to thinking for herself, for her aunt has chiefly directed her actions (though her thoughts are often very different). Belinda is innocent and loving, and feels affection towards Clarence Hervey, though she hardly admits it even to herself. Mr. Vincent and Sir Philip both wish to marry her. She is generous and warmly forgiving, as seen when she sincerely forgives Lady Delacour, but has great self-control over her emotions – for example, she keeps her face straight and does not blush later when people talk about Clarence Hervey, and is not shaken by Mrs. Freke's vow to be her "sworn enemy". This rationality, however, led some contemporary critics to call her cold, and though in response Edgeworth made some minor changes to her second edition of 1802, she did not change the substance of Belinda.

Clarence Hervey: An eccentric, idealistic young man, who is clever, witty, and gallant, and in Belinda's first impression of him is thus worded: "a most uncommonly pleasing young man". He is shown to have a warm heart, for he frankly asks Lady Delacour to make his peace with Belinda after he spoke rashly about her. He admires Lady Delacour, and endeavors to "reform" her; and being constantly of her party, he begins to admire Belinda. However, he had been secretly bringing up the innocent Virginia in an attempt to create a perfect wife, and now, thinking that in all honor he must marry Virginia, he struggles vainly to relinquish the lovely and intelligent Belinda. This almost ruins all hope of happiness; but Virginia reveals to him that she loves somebody else (or actually, to be more exact, the "figure" of Captain Sunderland – for she has never actually met him). Thus freed from all restraint, he confesses his love for Belinda, and they are married.

Lady Anne Percival: a very different lady from Lady Delacour, she is a gentle, motherly, delicate, and admirably amiable lady. Clarence Hervey is struck with "the expression of happiness in Lady Anne's countenance," and regards her as one of the most amiable and happiest women he ever saw; and Belinda thinks to herself, "...Lady Anne Percival's wit is like the refulgent moon, we 'Love the mild rays, and bless the useful light.'" She later also remarks to Mr. Vincent, when he compares Lady Anne Percival and Lady Delacour, "I have never seen any woman who would not suffer by a comparison with Lady Anne Percival." She has much knowledge, and a love of literature, that makes her a fine companion to Mr. Percival. She is kind and motherly, and loves Helena like her daughter, but does not try to take her affections from her blood mother, and refrains from telling Helena of the faults and foibles of her mother. She treats Belinda with kind affection, and does not like to judge or condemn anybody hastily. She wished for Belinda to marry Mr. Vincent. At first, Lady Delacour regarded her with angry aversion, suspecting her of having all of Helena's affections, perhaps influenced by a still remaining spark of affection for Mr. Percival, and saying, "I hate pattern women!" However, at the end, she probably becomes good friends with Lady Anne Percival.

== Literary significance and reception ==
Literary critic George Saintsbury argued that Jane Austen's naturalistic female characters owed a debt to this society novel's spirited heroine. When Austen was updating her early novel-draft Susan, which eventually appeared in print as Northanger Abbey, she added a reference to Belinda:

" 'Oh, it is only a novel.....It is only Cecilia or Camilla, or Belinda '; or, in short, only some work in which the greatest powers of the mind are displayed".

Belinda was itself in the tradition of British society novels by writers such as Frances Sheridan and Frances Burney, who also charted the travails of bright young women in search of a good marriage. Perhaps Edgeworth's best courtship novel, Belinda replaces mercenary fortune-hunting with a deeper quest for marital compatibility, valorising irrationality and love over reason and duty in a way that prefigures Austen's treatments of the same theme.

Aristocratic Lady Delacour in Belinda has been compared to Miss Milner in English novelist Elizabeth Inchbald's A Simple Story (1791).
