= Auguste-Jacques Lemierre d'Argy =

French writer and translator

Auguste-Jacques Lemierre d'Argy (1 March 1762, Paris – 12 December 1815, Paris) was an 18th–19th-century French writer and translator.

== Life ==
An interpreter and translator, among others by ministries and courts (conseil des prises maritimes, codirecteur du bureau de législation étrangère ... ), but also a bookseller in Paris, Auguste-Jacques Lemierre d'Argy is mostly known for his popular dramas. He is often mentioned for his drama in four acts in prose Calas, ou Le fanatisme dealing with the Calas affair, premiered in Paris 17 December 1790 at the Théâtre du Palais Royal and published in 1791. He was also the nephew of Antoine-Marin Lemierre (1723-1793), a poet and playwright, member of the Académie française.

== Works ==
- 1788: L'Élève du plaisir, with Samuel Jackson Pratt.
- 1791: Calas, ou le Fanatisme
- 1798: Poésie de Gray, by Thomas Gray and Auguste-Jacques Lemierre d'Argy (coauthor and translator), notes and explanations by M. Lemierre d'Argy.
- 1814: Relation authentique... de l'assaut donné, le 6 juillet 1809, au palais Quirinal et de l'enlèvement du Souverain Pontife le pape Pie VII....
- 1814: Le Château de l'indolence, poem in 2 chants (with James Thomson).

=== Translations ===
- 1787: Nouveau code criminel de l'empereur, published in Vienna in 1787, Hardouin and Gatey publishers, Paris.
- 1814: Mémoires de la reine d'Étrurie Marie-Louise de Bourbon, written by herself, translated from Italian, Éditions Chaumerot jeune.
- 1815: La Femme errante, by Frances Burney, translated from English by J.-B.-J. Breton de La Martinière and Auguste-Jacques Lemierre d'Argy.
