= Edwy and Elgiva =

1795 play

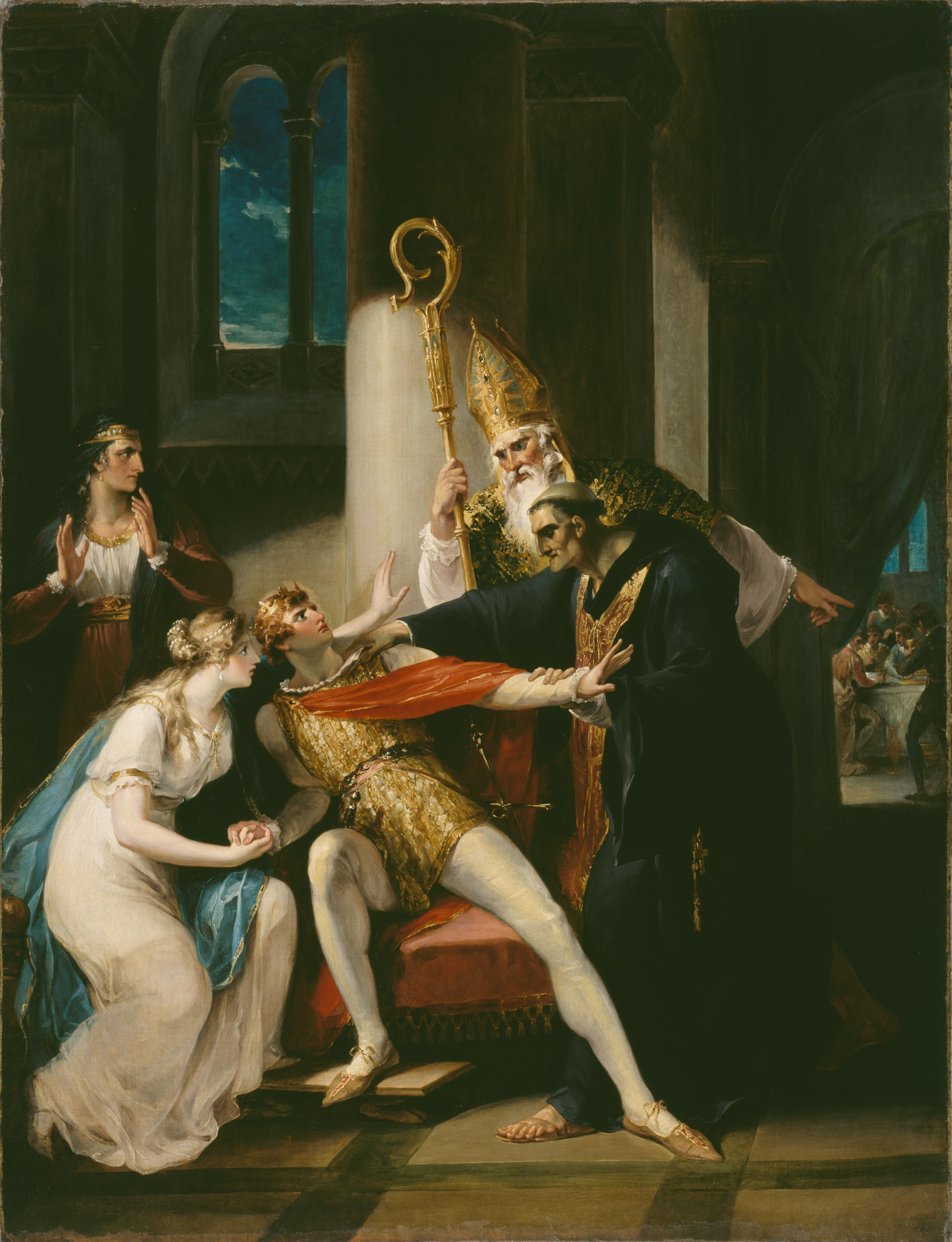
- Edwy and Elgiva by William Hamilton. Burney based the play on the historical figures Eadwig and Ælfgifu.
- Written by: Fanny Burney
- Original language: English
- Genre: Tragedy
- Setting: Anglo-Saxon England

Premiere
- Date premiered: 21 March 1795
- Place premiered: Theatre Royal, Drury Lane, London

Edwy and Elgiva is a historical tragedy by the English writer Fanny Burney. Written in 1790 it was first performed at the Theatre Royal, Drury Lane in London on 21 March 1795. The original cast included John Philip Kemble as Edwy, Sarah Siddons as Elgiva, John Palmer as Aldhem, William Barrymore as Cedric, Thomas Caulfield as Ernulf, John Whitfield as Redwald, Robert Bensley as Dunstan, Robert Benson as Orgar, Charles Kemble as Sigebert, John Hayman Packer as Leofric, Walter Maddocks as Peasant, John Phillimore as Ruffian and Jane Powell as Eltruda. The prologue was written by the author's brother Charles Burney. Despite its high-profile cast including three members of the Kemble dynasty, it was withdrawn after only one performance.

== Bibliography ==
- Greene, John C. Theatre in Dublin, 1745-1820: A Calendar of Performances, Volume 6. Lexington Books, 2011.
- Nicoll, Allardyce. A History of English Drama 1660–1900: Volume III. Cambridge University Press, 2009.
- Hogan, C.B (ed.) The London Stage, 1660–1800: Volume V. Southern Illinois University Press, 1968.
- Sabor, Peter. The Complete Plays of Frances Burney. Routledge, 2016.
