= Elizabeth Blower =

English writer and actress c. 1757/1763 – post-1816

Elizabeth Blower (c. 1757/1763 – post-1816) was an English poet, novelist and actress. Her earlier work comments on political, electoral and critical matters, but her two later novels are dominated by sentiment.

== Life ==
Elizabeth Blower was born in Worcester, England, a city then notorious for electoral violence, where her father once supported an unsuccessful independent candidate. According to a letter from William Hayley to Anna Seward, she took to writing when her family fell on hard times. She and a younger sister acted in Ireland for five years and in London in 1787–1788. Little more is known of her family background or personal life, but for a while, as Hayley wrote to Seward, she lived in London under the protection of the sculptor John Flaxman.

== Writings ==
Blower wrote her four novels and poetry between the ages of 17 and 25, initially publishing them anonymously. She featured in 1788 in the Catalogue of Five Hundred Celebrated Authors of Great Britain, Now Living.

Blower's first novel, The Parsonage House (1780) is epistolary. It casts a satirical eye over styles of fiction prominent at the time. Two years later she published some poetry and a second novel, George Bateman (1782), which includes a vivid account of electioneering, with some dialogue in dialect. This was well received as a novel and later as a stage adaptation. It includes a spirited discussion between some characters about Frances Burney's likewise epistolary novel Evelina, then newly published.

Her third novel, Maria (1785) follows an orphaned heroine through various vicissitudes to a decorous marriage. Features from Life, or a Summer Visit (1788) gives way to unbridled sentiment, beginning with a self-sacrifice offered by the wife to her husband. She is then betrayed and widowed and left in deep grief. Both these later novels exemplify "Blower's skill in concocting social satire and comedies of manners." The latter follows a rural marriage "broken by the seductions of London life." Another critic has described Features from Life as "a convincing, but repellent psychological study".
