= The Witlings =

Comedic play by Frances Burney

The Witlings is a comedic play written by Frances Burney in 1779. It is a comedy of manners that satirizes literary society. Burney's father believed the play was insulting and persuaded her to bury the play. The Witlings was first acted on stage in the 1990s, over two hundred years after it was written.

== History ==
The Witlings is a comedy that satirizes literary society. Burney's father, Charles Burney, understood the insulting parallels in the play, and persuaded his daughter to bury the play. The play went unproduced and almost unknown, until 1945, when her papers were acquired by the New York Public Library. The Witlings was not published until 1994, when Katherine Rogers included it in her anthology of Restoration and 18th-century women playwrights. In 1995, her plays, including The Witlings were published by McGill University.

The play was first performed on February 7, 1998 at the Main Street Theatre. The play was adapted for modern audiences by Patrick Young in 2014.

== Plot ==
=== Synopsis ===
The story involves the young lovers, Beaufort and Cecilia, who become estranged when Cecilia's estate is suddenly lost. Lady Smatter, Beaufort's aunt and guardian, will not allow the match to proceed, but Beaufort's friend, Censor, catches Smatter in her own literary pretensions. Thus blackmailed, Smatter is forced to relent, and the lovers are reconciled and the estate is recovered.

=== Act 1 ===
The opening to the play takes place in a Milliner's shop where the audience is introduced to a variety of characters: the owner of the shop, workers, and a few guests and clients. As the workers are rushed to work on a few items, a few clients come in and out with concerns on late items. During this time, Mr. Beaufort and Censor walk into the shop. Right away the audience is notified that the Milliner is a public place but really is meant for women, which is also the reason why Censor is so uncomfortable accompanying Mr. Beaufort in the Milliner's shop. They are waiting for Miss Stanley, Beaufort's soon to be wife. Meanwhile, Mrs. Voluble talks everyone's head off, and Mrs. Sapient also comes in, which adds more to Censor's dreadful impression of the place. Throughout Act 1, the audience gets a good understanding of who the characters are as well as their characteristics and backstory. Towards the end of the act, Jack reveals that he was to inform Mr. Beaufort that Miss Stanley was no longer going to meet him and right away Mr. Beaufort and Censor are annoyed with Jack's lack of focus. The act ends with Mrs. Voluble's son asking for his mother for dinner and being shooed off by Mrs. Voluble. A few key characters are Mrs. Wheedle, Mr. Beaufort, Censor, Mrs. Voluble, Mrs. Sapient, and Jack.

=== Act 2 ===
Act 2 begins with a conversation between Miss Stanley (Cecilia), and Lady Smatter, Mr. Beaufort's Aunt in a drawing room of Lady Smatter's. Their conversations consist of Mr. Dabler's literary works as well as their knowledge of literature in general. The audience starts to understand each other's point of what use is their knowledge and their purpose for involving themselves in these topics. Other characters that walk into the scene are Mr. Codger, Beaufort, Mr. Dabler, and Mrs. Sapient. Beaufort walks into the scene first and addresses the ladies and speaks of Jack's lack of communication in a timely manner. Then Mr. Codger enters and Lady Smatter asks him about friends from the north and Mr. Codger tries to tell a story but takes too long to do so and keeps getting interrupted. Mr. Dabler then enters and Lady Smatter starts to praise his work and at first he seems concerned but then feels at ease talking and sharing his works to Miss Smatter. Mr. Codger questions his work but doesn't really want to read his work. Mrs. Sapient talks just to talk and isn't really being listened to. Then Jack comes with news for Cecilia. Jack tells her that she has news for her but will tell her later in private. Everyone insists that he just tell the news and so finally he announces that Cecilia has gone broke.

=== Act 3 ===
Scene 1: During this act Cecilia reacts in total disappointment about her being broke. Mr. Beaufort is concerned because Cecilia is so upset and asks that his aunt calm her down. His aunt immediately reconsiders Cecilia's engagement with Mr. Beaufort and thinks it's unfortunate that she is broke but doesn't hesitate to disown her. Both Censor and Lady Smatter want Mr. Beaufort to leave Cecilia be and not marry her anymore but Mr. Beaufort is adamant about marrying Cecilia because he truly loves her.

Scene 2: Opens with Mr. Dabler in his room working on his literature and being interrupted. He becomes frustrated and finally Mrs. Voluble starts to praise his work and skill. Mr. Dabler then leaves and asks Mrs. Voluble to close his room and not let anyone go through his items. Mrs. Voluble waits for him to leave and goes through his papers. As Mrs. Voluble rumuges through his papers she is interrupted by Miss Jenny and Bob. Cecilia then comes asking for advice on where to go to figure out her situation but Mrs. Voluble insists on knowing what is going on.

=== Act 4 ===
The Esprit Party is introduced at Lady Smatter's apartment. Burney uses this scene to really showcase how ridiculous a few of the characters are in pretending to understand literature and having conversations that mean nothing. The gathering becomes a background once it is interrupted, which also proves that the gathering is really of no importance. The gathering is interrupted and focuses on Censor's concern for Beaufort and Beaufort declaring his loyalty to Cecilia and willingness to give up Lady Smatter's inheritance.

=== Act 5 ===
The conclusion of the play.

=== Characters ===
Lady Smatter:

Miss Stanley/Cecilia:

Beaufort:

Censor:

Codger:

Dabler:

Jack:

Mrs. Wheedle:

Mrs. Voluble:

Mrs. Sapient:

Miss Jenny:

Miss Sally:
