= Althea Douglas =

Canadian genealogist, archivist, researcher and writer

Althea Douglas (1926–2018) was a Canadian genealogist, archivist, researcher and writer who authored several books about archival and genealogical research. Over the course of her career, Douglas conducted research for what would become the Burney Centre and McGill University, was an author of technical manuals for IMAX Corporation, and ran a Toronto-based consulting business.

== Early life and education ==
Douglas was born December 25, 1926, in Moncton, New Brunswick and was the only daughter of George E. and Anne "Nan" (née Chapman) McCoy. Raised in Toronto, she attended Branksome Hall School before her family relocated to Montreal, where she spent the next several decades of her life. She obtained a B.Sc. (1947) and M.A. (1958) at McGill University. Douglas marries J. Creighton Douglas on February 28, 1948.

== Career ==
Following graduation Douglas worked for ten years as a costume designer in Montreal and New York. A career change landed her at McGill University, where she worked as a lecturer in English (1947–1959) and as a researcher on a project related to what would become the Burney Centre. She later worked as an archivist from 1978 to 1981 at the Dr. Wilder Penfield Collection at the Montreal Neurological Institute. During this period she began working as a genealogist and in 1989 was certified by the Genealogical Institute of the Maritimes.

In 1982 Douglas and her husband relocated to Toronto, where both worked for IMAX. Douglas began as a part-time employee editing standard manuals, and eventually becoming an author of specialised manuals for use of IMAX technology in various countries based on the region's technological context. As an employee at IMAX, she was an early adopter of AutoCAD to facilitate the use of diagrams, and subsequent updates, as part of her technical work. Outside of work, Douglas continued archival and genealogical work, establishing "Althea Douglas Consultants". One of her projects consisted of working for the Girl Guides of Canada to establish the arrangement structure for their archives, as well as developing a catalogue and digital finding aids.

Following a move to Ottawa, Douglas transitioned to work as a professional genealogist researching and publishing a number of works through the Ontario Genealogical Society. In addition to her own books, Canadian Railway Records – A Guide for Genealogists (1994) was co-authored with her husband. In a review of "Help! I’ve Inherited an Attic Full of History", Douglas' guide for non-archivists, Candice Vetter called the work "useful and easy to follow" containing "advice essential for the layperson".

== Later life and death ==
Douglas' consulting business closed in 1991, at which time she relocated to Ottawa and continued working and writing as a genealogist. Douglas died October 21, 2018, in Ottawa, where she has lived in a retirement home since 2015.
