= Camilla (Burney novel) =

1796 novel by Frances Burney

Camilla A Picture of Youth
- Author: Frances Burney
- Language: English
- Publication date: 1796

Camilla, subtitled A Picture of Youth, is a novel by Frances Burney, first published in 1796. Camilla deals with the matrimonial concerns of a group of young people: Camilla Tyrold and her sisters, the sweet tempered Lavinia and the smallpox scarred Eugenia, and their cousin, the beautiful Indiana Lynmere—and in particular, with the love affair between Camilla herself and her eligible suitor, Edgar Mandlebert. They have many hardships, however, caused by misunderstandings and mistakes, in the path of true love.

Camilla was published by subscription, a Georgian version of crowdfunding. Amongst the 1058 subscribers listed were Elizabeth Montagu, Hannah More, Ann Radcliffe, and Jane Austen. This was the first occasion in her lifetime that Jane Austen's name appeared in print.

== Plot summary ==
Camilla focuses on the story of the Tyrold family. Augustus ("Mr Tyrold") and Sir Hugh Tyrold are brothers who, after a period of estrangement lasting an unspecified number of years, are reunited after Sir Hugh sends Mr Tyrold a letter expressing his desire to move near his parsonage, requesting him to purchase an estate called Cleves and prepare it for the arrival of Sir Hugh, his niece Indiana Lynmere, and her governess Miss Margland (his other ward, Clermont Lynmere, is to be sent to "the Continent" to be educated). His primary motivation for the move is that after years of being active, and a confirmed bachelor, he is injured and becomes too weak to partake of the active physical and social life he once enjoyed. Forced to pursue entertainment and solace in more sedentary ways, he finds himself woefully unprepared and further persuades Mr Tyrold to engage a tutor. Mr Tyrold complies and hires Dr Orkborne, a man better suited to private academic pursuits than pedagogy. This plan proves to be untenable and Sir Hugh is left scrambling to find a permanent "scholar" to place under Orkborne's tutelage, not wanting to offend the academic by dismissing him so soon after dragging him all the way out to Cleves.

In the meantime, Sir Hugh becomes enchanted by his brother's middle daughter, Camilla, and decides to make her heiress to most of his fortune. He also requests the privilege of raising her, which makes Mr and Mrs Tyrold uneasy because as much as they value Sir Hugh's kindness and generosity, they both find him unsuitable as a guardian as he is too indulgent and desirous to please. Nevertheless, they allow Camilla to go to Cleves. It is there that Camilla's brother Lionel, elder sister, Lavinia, and younger sister, Eugenia, and her father's ward, Edgar Mandelbert, go to celebrate Camilla's tenth birthday.

Mrs Tyrold allowed Eugenia to join the festivities only on the promise that the party of young people would not leave the grounds of Cleves because the girl had not yet been inoculated against smallpox. Unfortunately, Lionel's mischievous and restless nature leads him to convince his uncle to allow the entire party of children to go to a fair. It is here that Eugenia is exposed to and contracts smallpox. Eugenia is disfigured but survives, only to suffer a tragic see-saw accident which leaves her further maimed and crippled. As a result, Sir Hugh disowns not only Camilla but all of his nieces and nephews in favour of making Eugenia his sole heiress. He justifies this sweeping action by arranging an eventual marriage between Eugenia and Clermont Lynmere. In the meantime, he consigns Eugenia's education to Dr Orkbourne so that if she will not be a beautiful bride, she will at least be a highly intelligent one able to entertain and engage her future husband in what he calls hic hæc hoc—that is, is to receive the same sort of intensive, classical education that was at the time more generally given to boys and rarely to girls. Though at first dismissive of the idea of educating girls in general and the teaching of Greek and Latin to females in particular, Dr Orkbourne discovers that Eugenia is not only an enthusiastic student but one who is also extremely intelligent and capable.

At first, Edgar Mandelbert finds himself drawn to Indiana's exquisite beauty. Sir Hugh decides that despite their young ages (13 and ten respectively), Edgar and Indiana are clearly destined for each other. This means that Sir Hugh spends much of the early part of the novel waiting and planning for the day when Edgar and Clermont leave off their educations and finishing tours of the Continent so that they may marry Indiana and Eugenia.

When Edgar does finish his education and reaches the age of majority, he leaves university to take over the running of his finances and estate, Beech Park, from his guardian, Mr Tyrold. In re-acquainting himself with the Tyrold sisters and Indiana, Edgar finds himself drawn to Camilla. She also finds herself drawn to Edgar. Unfortunately, the mortifying realization that he is considered to be Indiana's intended complicates his attempts at courtship until he can resolve the misunderstanding. Even so, the machinations of Miss Margland, the jealousy of Indiana, circumstances in general (including Camilla's misadventures in navigating country society and new acquaintances such as the dim-witted Mr Dubster, the rakish Sir Sedley Clarendel, and the beautiful, reputable, witty, but lamentably satirical widow Mrs Arlbery) and Edgar's judgmental nature in particular serve to make his wooing of Camilla extremely protracted. He finally wins Camilla's hand only to relinquish it almost immediately after catching Sir Sedley Clarendel kissing Camilla's hand.

Clarendel, a frivolous and flirtatious baronet, mortified to have fallen in love with Camilla, tries to save face by protesting that he had no serious designs on Camilla's affections, or pretensions to marriage with her. Once done, he kisses the confused girl's hand. Edgar witnesses this act with revulsion and astonishment, which offends Camilla. She frees him from their engagement and with her father's blessing and encouragement, removes to Southampton to visit her new friend, Mrs Berlington, with Eugenia, Indiana, and Miss Margland following behind a few hours later to provide company and proper supervision. This is, of course, taken by Edgar as further sign that Camilla is capricious, weak, frivolous, and above all a debased flirt. Dr Marchmont, Edgar's tutor and mentor in matters of the heart, encourages these assumptions.

While Camilla suffers through one misadventure after the other, her sister Eugenia attracts the notice of fortune hunter Alphonso Bellamy. He appeals to Miss Margland's vanity by flattering her into pleading his case to Eugenia and Sir Hugh, and eventually asks Sir Hugh for Eugenia's hand. He is refused, not being known to Sir Hugh nor particularly welcome as Eugenia is intended for Clermont.

Bellamy eventually kidnaps Eugenia and forces her into marriage; Edgar eventually stops listening to the misogynistic Dr Marchmont; Camilla falls into and gets out of debt; Lionel is forced to give up frivolity; Sir Hugh is nearly bankrupted by his nephews; and Mr Tyrold spends some time in debtors' prison. But all ends well as Bellamy accidentally kills himself, Mr Tyrold is freed, Camilla and Edgar are married, Lavinia marries Hal Westwyn, Indiana elopes with a penniless hotheaded military ensign called Macdersey, Clermont gets beaten by a servant he unfairly tried to whip, and Eugenia (it is hinted) eventually marries Mr Melmond, a man whose fine education and extremely emotional outbursts had won her heart early in the novel.

== Main characters ==
Camilla is the seventeen-year-old protagonist of the novel. She is in love with Edgar Mandlebert but frequent misunderstandings prevent their union.
Frances Burney decided on the name 'Camilla' for her heroine shortly before the novel's publication. At one time she was called Clarinda, but most frequently Ariella. As late as 15 July 1795, Frances Burney wrote to her brother Charles to say, 'The name of my heroine is ARIELLA.' Dr. Burney, however, objected to the name Ariella, so the novelist struck out the name Ariella and wrote in the name he suggested, Camilla.
Camilla is very pretty, though not as exquisitely beautiful as Indiana. She is generous (caring about poor people and the singing bird that was "pinched"), cheerful spirited, sincere, and very emotional. She loves her family dearly. Her naive simplicity and admiration can sometimes lead her into danger, such as when she makes friends with the witty and eccentric Mrs. Arlbery, or the beautiful and romantic Mrs. Berlinton. Her brother Lionel calls her "the best girl in the world, when she did not mount the pulpit."
Edgar Mandlebert is a ward of Mr. Tyrold. He is in possession of a large inheritance and estate at Beech Park. He is handsome, chivalrous, and in love with Camilla but must first make sure that she is as virtuous and worthy of his esteem as he wants her to be, especially since some of her actions, though innocent, have the appearance of coquetry. At his best, he is an uncertain lover too easily led astray by the misogynistic Dr Marchmont. At his worst—and sadly, too frequent—he is judgmental and cold; too prudish for his generation and even that preceding him. He is nearly as superficial as Indiana, though his shallowness takes a different bent. Obsessed with being upright and several times described by other characters in the novel as "nice" and "peculiar" (that is, fastidious and particular), he cares more about the appearance of what is proper and is disinclined to probe for any deeper meaning or to ask for (much less accept) any explanation. He makes baseless assumption after baseless assumption. When he does not, Dr Marchmont does for him, always tending to whatever makes others, especially Camilla, appear in the worst possible light.
Eugenia is Camilla's fifteen-year-old sister. As a result of Sir Hugh's actions at the beginning of the novel she is crippled and bears smallpox pits: therefore, though she had originally been the prettiest of the Tyrold sisters, she is now the plainest. Because of this Sir Hugh leaves the entirety of his fortune to her after his death. Her mind, however, is intelligent while being very innocent; and her heart is extremely gentle, merciful, and humble. Sir Hugh Tyrold attempts to keep from her all knowledge of her own personal defects, and therefore she is the more shocked at some peasant women's coarse insults to her. Mr. Tyrold, however, teaches her that beauty is superficial, by showing her a beautiful but mad woman. Her generosity and freedom from selfish jealousy astonishes Melmond when she gives him up to Indiana, even trying to help their marriage financially.
Lavinia is Camilla's nineteen-year-old sister. The book describes her as:

"Her polished complexion was fair, clear, and transparent; her features were of the extremest delicacy, her eyes of the softest blue, and her smile displayed internal serenity. The unruffled sweetness of her disposition bore the same character of modest excellence...the meekness of her composition degernated not into insensibility; it was open to all the feminine of pity, of sympathy, and of tenderness."

She later earns well-deserved happiness with Hal Westwyn, Sir Hugh Tyrold's close friend's son, an amiable and chivalrous young man. Her personality is very gentle, modest, and sympathizing, but a fine sense of morality points out to her the error of her brother Lionel's ways, which cost her many a remonstrating, but ineffectual, sigh.
Lionel is Camilla's older brother. He is very mischievous and enjoys practical jokes. Later on his violent spirits and lack of morals carry him too far. He is dearly loved by all his sisters, especially Camilla, but his shameless sefishness taxes her affection severely by making her sacrifice much happiness for his benefit.
Indiana Lynmere is Camilla's seventeen-year-old cousin under the care of Sir Hugh. She is exquisitely beautiful but shallow and selfish, and has a taste for flirting. She is very easily flattered by eloquent compliments, but her heart not being deep or passionate, she is not very constant.
Clermont Lynmere is Camilla's cousin under the care of Sir Hugh. He is at school for most of the novel and when he returns is found to be brutish and rude, and is one of the only people in the book who actually makes Sir Hugh Tyrold anything near angry. He is extremely aggravating towards servants, and is very violent. Mr. Westwyn heartily disapproves of him and is rather satisfied when Clermont's selfish brutality lands him in a fight.
Sir Hugh Tyrold is Camilla's uncle who lives at Cleves. He is uneducated but very good natured and sweet tempered, with good morals and an excellent heart. Camilla is his favourite niece, her sprightliness and lively sweetness endearing her to him. He is very generous and charitable. However, his naiveness sometimes entangles those whom he wishes best: for instance, he wants Edgar to marry Indiana, and Clermont to marry Eugenia; however, both hopes are unfulfilled—Edgar marries Camilla, which he rejoices in, and Eugenia marries Melmond. At the end of the book, his new matchmaking hopes have landed on Miss Margland and Dr. Orkbourne.
Mr Tyrold is Camilla's father whom she lives with at Etherington. He is a pastor and is very well respected by his daughters. He has a kind, gentle temper, strengthened by steady sense.
Mrs Tyrold is Camilla's mother. She is revered by her daughters, and she loves her husband. However, sometimes her perfectionism frightens Camilla: for instance, when Camilla has landed her father in prison because of her debts, she thinks she can muster up courage to beg her father and uncle's forgiveness, but at the thought of going near her mother, she is almost frightened out of her senses. Mrs. Tyrold has a truly good heart, however, and she kindly forgives Camilla in the end.
Miss Margland is the governess at Cleves. She is Indiana's almost constant companion and an annoyance to Sir Hugh and Dr. Orkbourne. Scornful and selfish, her greatest object is to go to London again, and when she is dismayed by Edgar's preference for Camilla, she has no scruples in treating her with indelicate cruelty herself, and egging Indiana to do the same.
Dr Orkbourne is Eugenia's teacher at Cleves. He is interested almost solely in his studies. The servants think he is "cracked," but Sir Hugh insists they respect Dr. Orkbourne. Eugenia respects him.
Dr Marchmont is an advisor and friend to Edgar. He is extremely skeptical of women based on his past experiences, and though honest and kind, he continually dissuades Edgar from proposing to Camilla, and cautions him.
Mrs Arlbery is a friend of Camilla. Her status as a widow allows her to have much more freedom than generally allowed to women at the time. She enjoys bossing fashionable men around with ridiculous orders. Her sense of satire aside, she is the only one who sees Edgar Mandlebert for the emotional coward he really is, explaining perfectly his faults to a disbelieving Camilla.
Sir Sedley Clarendel is a friend of Mrs Arlberry. He is a baronet whose fortune of £15,000 per annum makes him wealthier than Mandlebert as well as his social superior. However, Sir Sedley's foppish manners prove initially repulsive to Camilla. Eventually, Camilla's sweet disposition, breeding, disinterestedness, and loveliness penetrate through Sir Sedley's foppish facade, leading to acts of generosity and a genuine admiration for her. Camilla is often too flustered to seriously withstand his attentions and her brother Lionel too often encourages Sir Sedley in the hopes that it will lead to many generous gifts of money once the baronet is married to Camilla. Upon finding that his attentions and hand are unwanted, he feigns a horror of any serious design on Camilla and flees to the Hebrides.

Melmond is a school acquaintance of Lionel's. He falls in love with Indiana before speaking to her, saying, "...she is all I ever read of! all I ever conceived! she is beauty in its very essence! she is elegance, delicacy, and sensibility personified!' To which even the thoughtless Lionel replies, 'All very true...but how should you know anything of her besides her beauty?'. Eugenia develops a crush on him because of his studious nature and fervent love of literature. Sometimes his romantic passions carry him away, as in the case of Indiana, but he has a good heart and principles underneath.
Mrs Berlinton is an eighteen-year-old friend of Camilla's and Melmond's sister. Camila describes her to Edgar as "attractive, gentle, amiable." She was forced to marry a much older man by her aunt but continues a correspondence with a mystery male. She is very beautiful and her sweetness of manners are captivating, which makes Camilla enraptured with her. She is very romantic, just like Melmond, but without the firmness of his principles: thus she sinks into gambling, flirting, and immoral "friendships."
Jacob is a faithful old family servant, who adores his master, Sir Hugh Tyrold. He speaks affectionately of Camilla to Edgar, loves his master, and is plain-spoken to Clermont Lynmere.
Nicholas Gwigg (Alphonso Bellamy): the younger son of the master of a great gaming-house. In his first youth, he had been utterly neglected, and run wild; but his father afterwards becoming rich, had bestowed on him as good an education as the late business with which it had begun could possibly give (it was pity, perhaps, that the education did not include morals). He tried gaming, but spending as fast as he earned, he acquired nothing; and once, in a tide of disfavour, he had cheated, and been found out. His father dead, his elder brother passive, he went to London, hoping to elope with some heiress by relying on his handsome face and flattery. In the process he changed his name to Alphonso Bellamy. He had first met with the beautiful Mrs. Berlinton, and though this would not make him any money, her romantic turn of mind and loveliness tempted him to a scheme yet darker. They had exchanged letters with each other after she left, and soon after he forced Eugenia to marry him by shocking her gentleness of disposition with a suicidal threat. He treated her cruelly, yelling at her and trying to force her to write to her uncle for money, and continuing his heinous correspondence, and even meeting with, Mrs. Berlinton. Several unpleasant debts of honour being claimed, he had tried to force Eugenia to write to her uncle for money by putting a gun to her head and saying he would kill himself immediately after she was dead. Terrified, she was beginning to agree, when the alarmed postillion shouted out, "Hold, villain! or you are a dead man!" His hand shook—the gun went off—and he dropped dead. His behavior to Eugenia throughout was selfish, unfeeling, and brutally cruel. At first, Eugenia really believed in his passion for her, and though refusing to accept it, she sincerely pitied him and would not suspect him. After the marriage, she found out what he was really like, but refused to persecute him in court ("Solemn has been my vow! sacred I must hold it!")
Mr Westwyn: A good-hearted old man and very close friend of Sir Hugh Tyrold. Though not so gentle or sweet tempered as his friend, he is affectionate and unassumingly plain spoken. He is very strict with his son, Hal, but clearly loves him dearly. He treats Clermont with well-deserved contempt, saying, "That person...is a fellow I have prodigious longing to give a good caning to." He takes a great liking to Camilla at first, but when he observes her seemingly coquettish behavior (in reality she was just making a naive mistake in the process of trying to repulse Hal's affection), his partiality for her soon cools. Later he grows delighted with Lavinia, who is "pretty near as pretty" as her sister, and whose gentle sweetness wins his blunt heart over.

== Literary references ==
Jane Austen referred to Camilla and other novels in her novel, Northanger Abbey: "'And what are you reading, Miss — ?' 'Oh! It is only a novel!' replies the young lady, while she lays down her book with affected indifference, or momentary shame. 'It is only Cecilia, or Camilla, or Belinda; or, in short, only some work in which the greatest powers of the mind are displayed, in which the most thorough knowledge of human nature, the happiest delineation of its varieties, the liveliest effusions of wit and humour, are conveyed to the world in the best–chosen language.'"

Lady Delacour in Maria Edgeworth's novel Belinda also mentions Camilla to the heroine Belinda, saying, "You are thinking that you are like Camilla, and I like Mrs Mitten".
