= Frances Burney =

English novelist, diarist and playwright (1752–1840)

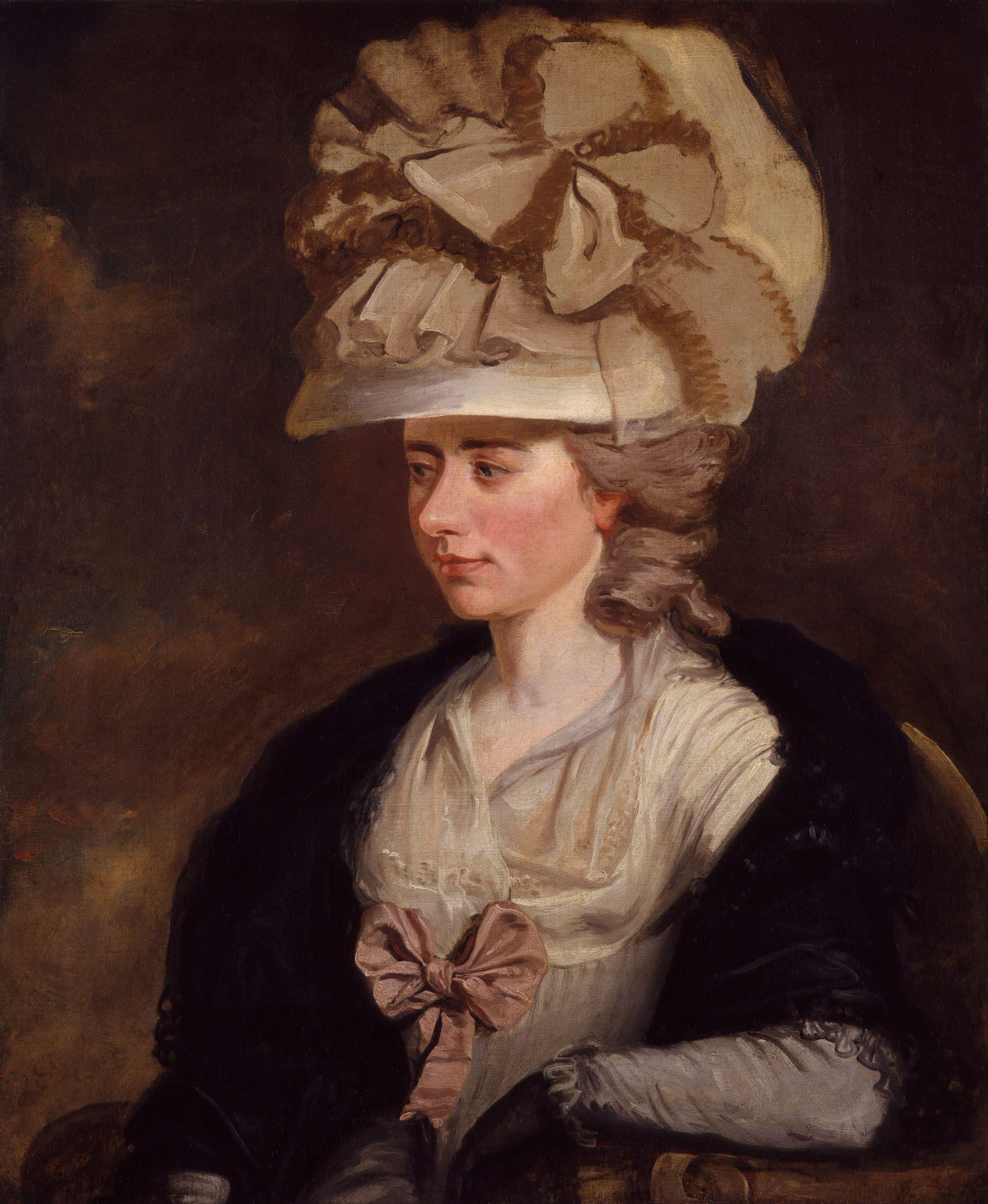
- Portrait by her cousin Edward Francis Burney
- Born: 13 June 1752; Lynn Regis, England
- Died: 6 January 1840 (aged 87); Bath, England
- Writing career
- Notable works: Journals (1768–1840); Evelina (1778); Cecilia (1782); Camilla (1796); The Wanderer (1814)

Signature
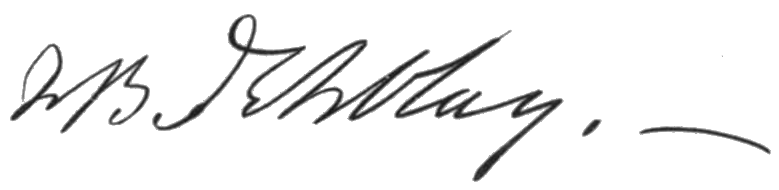

Frances Burney (13 June 1752 – 6 January 1840), also known as Fanny Burney and later Madame d'Arblay, was an English novelist, diarist and playwright. In 1786–1790 she held the post of "Keeper of the Robes" to Charlotte of Mecklenburg-Strelitz, George III's queen. In 1793, aged 41, she married a French exile, General Alexandre d'Arblay. After a long writing career that gained her a reputation as one of England's foremost literary authors, and after wartime travels that stranded her in France for over a decade, she settled in Bath, England, where she died on 6 January 1840. The first of her four novels, Evelina (1778), was the most successful and remains her most highly regarded, followed by Cecilia (1782). She also wrote a number of plays. She wrote a memoir of her father (1832), and is perhaps best remembered as the author of letters and journals that have been gradually published since 1842, whose influence has overshadowed the reputation of her fiction, establishing her posthumously as a diarist more than as a novelist or playwright.

== Overview of career ==
Frances Burney was a novelist, diarist and playwright. In all, she wrote four novels, eight plays, one biography and twenty-five volumes of journals and letters. She has gained critical respect in her own right, but she foreshadowed such novelists of manners with a satirical bent as Jane Austen and William Makepeace Thackeray.

She published her first novel, Evelina, anonymously in 1778. Burney feared that her father would find what she called her "scribblings", so she only told her siblings and two trusted aunts about the work. Her closest sister, Susanna, helped with the cover-up. Eventually, her father read the novel and guessed that she was its author. News of her identity spread. The novel brought Burney almost immediate fame with its unique narrative and comic strengths. She followed it with Cecilia in 1782, Camilla in 1796 and The Wanderer in 1814.

All Burney's novels explore the lives of English aristocrats and satirise their social pretensions and personal foibles, with an eye to larger questions such as the politics of female identity. With one exception, Burney never succeeded in having her plays performed, largely due to objections from her father, who thought that publicity from such an effort would be damaging to her reputation. The exception was Edwy and Elgiva, which was not well received by the public and closed after the first night's performance despite having Sarah Siddons in the cast.

Although her novels were hugely popular during her lifetime, Burney's reputation as a writer of fiction suffered after her death at the hands of biographers and critics, who felt that the extensive diaries, published posthumously in 1842–1846, offer a more interesting and accurate portrait of 18th-century life. Today, critics are returning to her novels and plays with renewed interest in her outlook on the social lives and struggles of women in a predominantly male-oriented culture. Scholars continue to value Burney's diaries as well, for their candid depictions of English society.

Throughout her writing career, Burney's talent for satirical caricature was widely acknowledged: figures such as Dr Samuel Johnson, Edmund Burke, Hester Lynch Thrale, David Garrick and other members of the Blue Stockings Society to which she aligned herself were among her admirers. Her early novels were read and enjoyed by Jane Austen, whose own title Pride and Prejudice derives from the final pages of Cecilia. Thackeray is said to have drawn on the first-person account of the Battle of Waterloo recorded in her diaries while writing his Vanity Fair.

Burney's early career was strongly affected by her relations with her father and the critical attentions of a family friend, Samuel Crisp. Both encouraged her writing, but used their influence to dissuade her from publishing or performing her dramatic comedies, as they saw the genre as inappropriate for a lady. Many feminist critics see her as an author whose natural talent for satire was stifled by the social pressures on female authors. Burney persisted despite the setbacks. When her comedies were poorly received, she returned to novel writing, and later tried her hand at tragedy. She supported both herself and her family on the proceeds of her later novels, Camilla and The Wanderer.

== Family life ==
Burney was born in Lynn Regis, now King's Lynn, England, on 13 June 1752, to the musician Dr Charles Burney (1726–1814) and his first wife, Esther Sleepe Burney (1725–1762), as the third of her mother's six children. Her elder siblings were Esther (Hetty, 1749–1832) and James (1750–1821); those younger were Susanna Elizabeth (1755–1800), Charles (1757–1817) and Charlotte Ann (1761–1838). Of her brothers, James became an admiral and sailed with Captain James Cook on his second and third voyages. The younger Charles Burney became a well-known classical scholar, after whom The Burney Collection of Newspapers is named.

Her younger sister Susanna married, in 1781, Molesworth Phillips, an officer in the Royal Marines who had sailed in Captain Cook's last expedition; she left a journal that gives a principal eye-witness account of the Gordon Riots. Her younger half-sister Sarah Harriet Burney (1772–1844) also became a novelist, publishing seven works of fiction. Esther Sleepe Burney also bore two other boys, both named Charles, who died in infancy in 1752 and 1754.

Frances Burney began composing small letters and stories almost as soon as she learnt the alphabet. She often joined with her brothers and sisters in writing and acting in plays. The Burney family had many close friends. "Daddy Crisp" was almost like a second father to Frances and a strong influence on her early writing years. Burney scholar Margaret Anne Doody has investigated conflicts within the Burney family that affected Burney's writing and her personal life. She alleged that one strain was an incestuous relationship between Burney's brother James and their half-sister Sarah in 1798–1803, but there is no direct evidence for this, and Burney was affectionate towards Sarah and provided her with financial assistance in later life.

Frances Burney's mother, Esther Sleepe, described by historians as a woman of "warmth and intelligence", was the daughter of a French refugee named Dubois and had been brought up a Catholic. This French heritage influenced Frances Burney's self-perception in later life, possibly contributing to her attraction and subsequent marriage to Alexandre d'Arblay. Esther Burney died in 1762 when Frances was ten years old.

Frances's father, Charles Burney, was noted for his personal charm, and for his talents as a musician, a musicologist, a composer and a man of letters. In 1760 he moved his family to London, a decision that improved their access to English high society and social standing. They lived amidst an artist social circle that gathered round Charles at their home in Poland Street, Soho.

In 1767, Charles Burney eloped to marry for a second time, to Elizabeth Allen, the wealthy widow of a King's Lynn wine merchant. Allen had three children of her own, and several years after the marriage the two families merged. This new domestic situation was fraught with tension. The Burney children found their new stepmother overbearing and quick to anger, and they made fun of her behind her back. However, their collective unhappiness may have also brought them closer to one another. In 1774 the family moved again, to what had been the house of Isaac Newton in St Martin's Street, Westminster.

== Education ==
Burney's sisters Esther and Susanna were favoured by their father, for what he perceived as their superior attractiveness and intelligence. At the age of eight, Burney had yet to learn the alphabet; some scholars suggest she had a form of dyslexia. By the age of ten, however, she had begun to write for her own amusement. Esther and Susanna were sent by their father to be educated in Paris, while at home Burney educated herself by reading from the family collection, including Plutarch's Lives, works by Shakespeare, histories, sermons, poetry, plays, novels and courtesy books. She drew on this material, along with her journals, when writing her first novels. Scholars who have looked into the extent of Burney's reading and self-education find a child who was unusually precocious and ambitious, working hard to overcome an early disability.

From the age of fifteen, Burney lived in the midst of a brilliant social circle, gathered round her father in Poland Street, and later in St Martin's Street. David Garrick was a frequent visitor, often arriving before eight o'clock in the morning. Burney left detailed accounts of people they entertained, notably of Omai, a young man from Raiatea, and of Alexis Orlov, a favourite of Catherine the Great. She first met Dr Samuel Johnson at her father's home in March 1777.

A critical aspect of Burney's literary education was her relationship with a family friend, the dramatist Samuel Crisp, who had met her father in about 1745 at the house of Charles Cavendish Fulke Greville. He encouraged Burney's writing by soliciting frequent journal-letters from her that recounted to him the goings-on in her family and social circle in London. Burney paid her first formal visit to Crisp at Chessington Hall in Surrey in 1766.

== Journal-diaries and Caroline Evelyn ==
The first entry in Frances Burney's journal was dated 27 March 1768 and addressed to "Nobody". The journal itself was to extend over 72 years. Burney kept the journal-diary as a form of correspondence with family and friends, recounting life events and her observations of them. The diary contains a record of her extensive reading in her father's library, as well as the visits and behaviour of notable people who visited their home. Burney and her sister Susanna were particularly close, and Burney continued to send journal-letters to Susanna throughout her adult life.

Burney was 15 when her father married Elizabeth Allen in 1767. Her diary entries suggest that she had begun to feel pressure to abandon her writing as something "unladylike" that "might vex Mrs. Allen." Feeling that she had transgressed, the same year she burnt her first manuscript, The History of Caroline Evelyn, which she had written in secret. Frances recorded in her diary an account of the emotions that led up to that dramatic act and eventually used it as a foundation for her first novel, Evelina, which follows the life of the fictional Caroline Evelyn's daughter.

In keeping with Burney's sense of propriety, in later life she heavily edited sections of her earlier diaries, destroying much of the material. Editors Lars Troide and Joyce Hemlow recovered some of this obscured material while researching their editions of Burney's journals and letters in the late twentieth century.

== Evelina ==
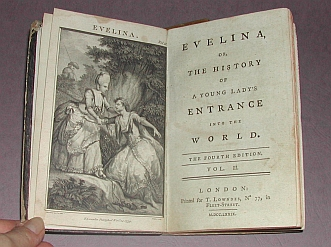
Evelina, Volume II, 4th edition (1779)

Burney's Evelina or the History of a Young Lady's Entrance into the World was published anonymously in 1778 without her father's knowledge or permission, by Thomas Lowndes, who voiced an interest after reading its first volume and agreed to publish it upon receipt of the finished work. The novel had been rejected by a previous publisher, Robert Dodsley, who declined to print an anonymous work. Burney, who worked as her father's amanuensis, had copied the manuscript in a "disguised hand" to prevent any identification of the book with her family, thinking that her own handwriting might be recognised by a publisher. Burney's second attempt to publish Evelina involved the help of her eldest brother James, who posed as its author to Lowndes. Inexperienced at negotiating with a publisher, he only extracted twenty guineas (£21) as payment for the manuscript.

The novel was a critical success, with praise from respected persons, including the statesman Edmund Burke and the literary critic Samuel Johnson. It was admired for its comic view of wealthy English society and realistic portrayal of working-class London dialects. It is known today as a satire. It was even discussed by characters in another epistolary novel of the time: Elizabeth Blower's George Bateman (1782). Burney's father read public reviews of Evelina before learning that the author was his daughter. Although the act of publication was radical for its time, he was impressed by the favourable reactions and largely supported her. He certainly saw social advantages in having a successful writer in the family.

=== Critical reception ===
Written in epistolary form just as this was reaching its height of popularity, Evelina portrays the English upper middle class through a 17-year-old woman who has reached marriageable age. It was a Bildungsroman ahead of its time. Evelina pushed boundaries, for female protagonists were still "relatively rare" in that genre. Comic and witty, it is ultimately a satire of the oppressive masculine values that shaped a young woman's life in the 18th century, and of other forms of social hypocrisy. Encyclopædia Britannica calls it a "landmark in the development of the novel of manners".

In choosing to narrate the novel through letters written by the protagonist, Burney made use of her own writing experience. This course has won praise from critics past and present, for the direct access it provides to events and characters, and the narrative sophistication it demonstrates in linking the roles of narrator and heroine. The authors of Women in World History argue that she identifies difficulties faced by women in the 18th century, especially those on questions of romance and marriage. She is seen as a "shrewd observer of her times and a clever recorder of its charms and its follies". What critics have consistently found interesting in her writing is the introduction and careful treatment of a female protagonist, complete with character flaws, "who must make her way in a hostile world." These are recognisable also as features of Jane Austen's writing, and show Burney's influence on her work. Furthermore, she sought to put to use the epistolary form espoused periodically by Burney, as seen in Lady Susan and to a lesser extent Pride and Prejudice.

As a testament to its popularity, the novel went through four immediate editions. In 1971, Encyclopædia Britannica stated of Evelina: "Addressed to the young, the novel has a quality perennially young."

== Hester Thrale and Streatham ==
Evelina brought Burney to the attention of a patron of the arts, Hester Thrale, who invited Burney to visit her home in Streatham. The house was a centre for literary and political conversation. Though shy by nature, Burney reportedly impressed those she met, including Dr Johnson, who would remain a friend and correspondent throughout the period of her visits, from 1779 to 1783. Thrale wrote to Dr Burney on 22 July: "Mr. Johnson returned home full of the Prayes of the Book I had lent him, and protesting that there were passages in it which might do honour to Richardson: we talk of it for ever, and he feels ardent after the dénouement; he could not get rid of the Rogue, he said." Many of Johnson's compliments were transcribed into Burney's diary. Visits to Streatham occupied months at a time, and on several occasions the guests, including Frances Burney, made trips to Brighton and to Bath. Like other notable events, these were recorded in letters to her family.

== The Witlings ==
In 1779, encouraged by the public's warm reception of comic material in Evelina, and with offers of help from Arthur Murphy and Richard Brinsley Sheridan, Burney began to write a dramatic comedy called The Witlings. The play satirised a wide segment of London society, including the literary world and its pretensions. It was not published at the time because Burney's father and the family friend Samuel Crisp thought it would offend some of the public by seeming to mock the Bluestockings, and because they had reservations about the propriety of a woman writing comedy. The play tells the story of Celia and Beaufort, lovers kept apart by their families due to "economic insufficiency".

Burney's plays were discovered in 1945 when her papers were acquired by the Berg Collection of the New York Public Library. A complete edition was published in 1995.

== Cecilia ==
In 1782 Burney published Cecilia, or Memoirs of an Heiress, written partly at Chessington Hall and after much discussion with Crisp. The publishers, Thomas Payne and Thomas Cadell, paid Frances £250 for her novel, printed 2000 copies of the first edition, and reprinted it at least twice within a year.

The plot revolves around a heroine, Cecilia Beverley, whose inheritance from an uncle comes with the stipulation that she find a husband who will accept her name. Beset on all sides by suitors, the beautiful and intelligent Cecilia's heart is captivated by a man whose family's pride in its birth and ancestry would forbid such a change of name. He finally persuades Cecilia, against all her judgement, to marry him secretly, so that their union – and consequent change of name – can be presented to the family as an accomplished fact. The work received praise for the maturity of its ironic third-person narration, but was viewed as less spontaneous than her first work, and weighed by the author's self-conscious awareness of her audience. Some critics claim to have found the narration intrusive, while friends found the writing too closely modelled on Johnson's. Edmund Burke admired the novel, but moderated his praise with criticism of the array of characters and tangled, convoluted plots.

Jane Austen may have been inspired by a sentence in Cecilia to name her famous novel Pride and Prejudice: "'The whole of this unfortunate business,' said Dr Lyster, 'has been the result of pride and prejudice.'"

Her fellow Bluestocking, Anna Laetitia Barbauld wrote to Burney in 1813 encouraging her to publish her novel The Wanderer in the United States where her work, including Cecilia, was popular.

== The royal court ==
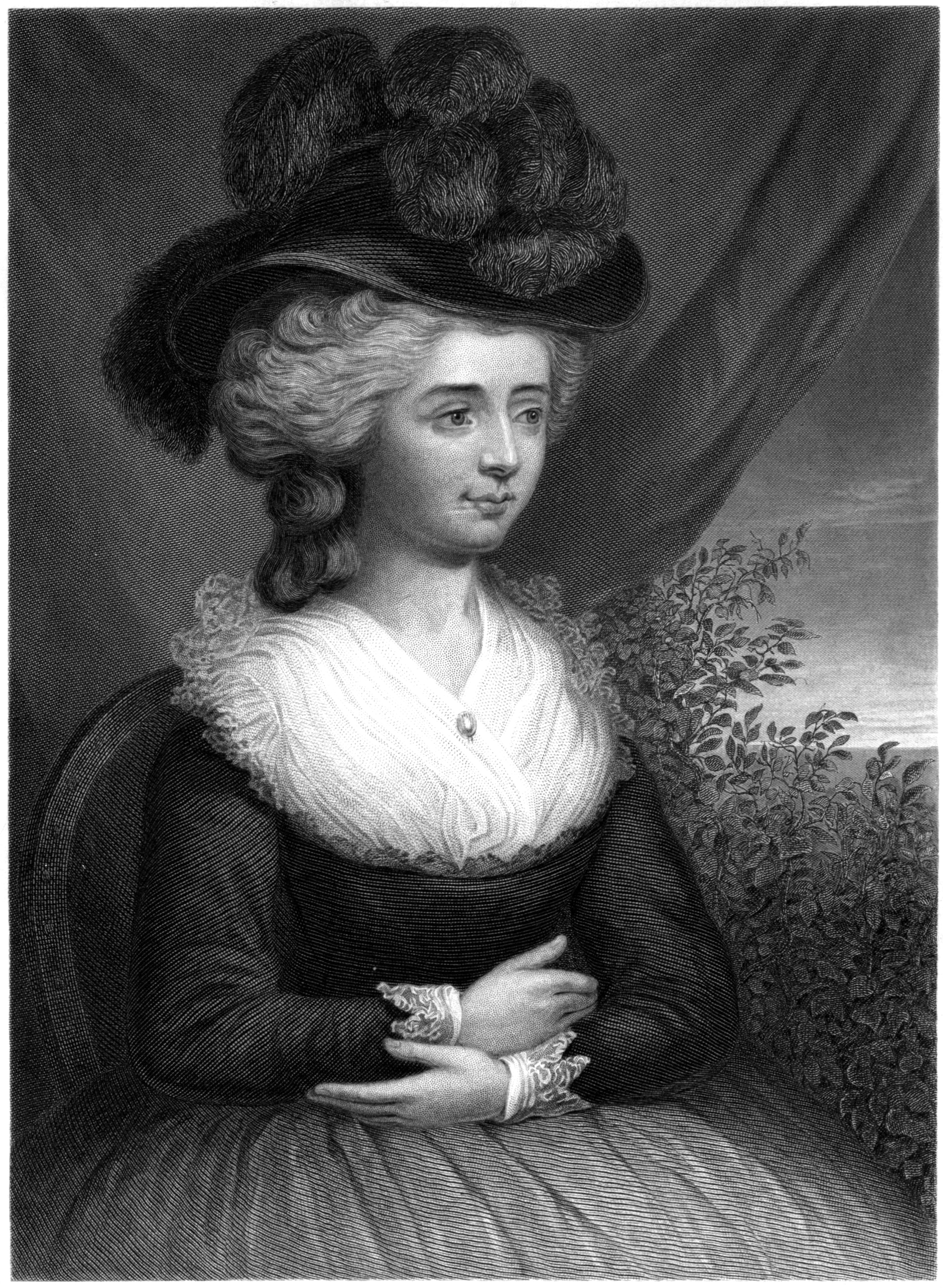
Print of Burney, 1782

In 1775 Burney turned down a marriage proposal from one Thomas Barlow, a man whom she had met only once. Her side of the Barlow courtship is amusingly told in her journal. During 1782–1785 she enjoyed the rewards of her successes as a novelist; she was received at fashionable literary gatherings throughout London. In 1781 Samuel Crisp died. In 1784 Dr Johnson died, and that year also brought her failure in a romance with a clergyman, George Owen Cambridge. She was 33 years old.

In 1785, an association with Mary Granville Delany, a woman known in both literary and royal circles, allowed Burney to travel to the court of King George III and Queen Charlotte, where the Queen offered her the post of "Keeper of the Robes", with a salary of £200 per annum. Burney hesitated to accept, not wishing to be separated from her family, and especially resistant to employment that would restrict free use of her time in writing. However, unmarried at 34, she felt pressure to accept and thought that improved social status and income might allow her greater freedom to write. Having accepted the post in 1786, she developed a warm relationship with the queen and princesses that lasted into her later years, yet her doubts proved accurate: the position exhausted her and left her little time for writing. Her sorrow was intensified by poor relations with her colleague Juliane Elisabeth von Schwellenburg, co-Keeper of the Robes, who has been described as "a peevish old person of uncertain temper and impaired health, swaddled in the buckram of backstairs etiquette."

Burney's continued to write journals during her years in the court. To her friends and to her sister Susanna, she recounted her life in court, along with major political events, including the public trial of Warren Hastings for "official misconduct in India". She recorded the speeches of Edmund Burke at the trial.

Burney was courted by an official of the royal household, Colonel Stephen Digby, but he eventually married another woman of greater wealth. The disappointment, combined with the other frustrations of office, may have contributed to her health failing at this time. In 1790 she prevailed on her father (whose own career had taken a new turn when he was appointed organist at Chelsea Hospital in 1783) to request that she be released from the post, which she was. She returned to her father's house in Chelsea, but continued to receive a yearly pension of £100. She kept up a friendship with the royal family and received letters from the princesses from 1818 until 1840.

=== The court plays ===
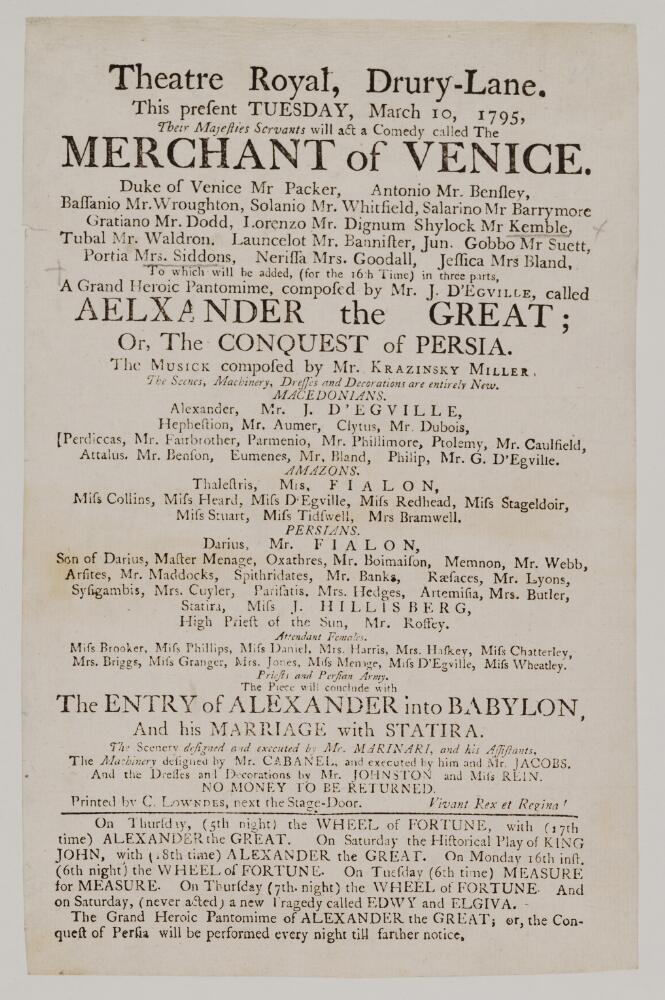
Bodleian Libraries, Playbill of Drury Lane Theatre, Tuesday, 10 March 1795, announcing The merchant of Venice &c.

From 1788, Burney's diaries record the composition of a small number of playtexts which were neither performed nor published in the author's lifetime, remaining in manuscript until 1995. These are the dramatic fragment conventionally known as Elberta and three completed plays copied out in handwriting in ordered booklets, suitable for private circulation, if not publication. These are Edwy and Elgiva, Hubert de Vere, and The Siege of Pevensey. Edwy and Elgiva was the only one to be staged, although for one night only, on 21 March 1795, garnering unanimous negative reviews from the public and critics. The long-delayed publication of these plays has largely kept critics. Even for the handful of scholars who have dealt with them, these texts remain devoid of particular dramatic qualities, indeed 'wretched', as they are often called: in the form in which they have come to us they seem too long to be staged; characterizations are stereotyped; the endings are weak, and the plots convoluted and inconsistent. The style, rhetorical and emphatic, makes them sound clumsy and heavy to the modern ear. However, when properly contextualized and studied as theatrical texts, rather than as unfortunate second-order productions within the works of a successful novelist as Burney, the four Court plays suggest a distinct thematic-stylistic-discursive alignment, more in line with the dramatic production of the late 18th century than has been recognized thus far.

== Marriage ==
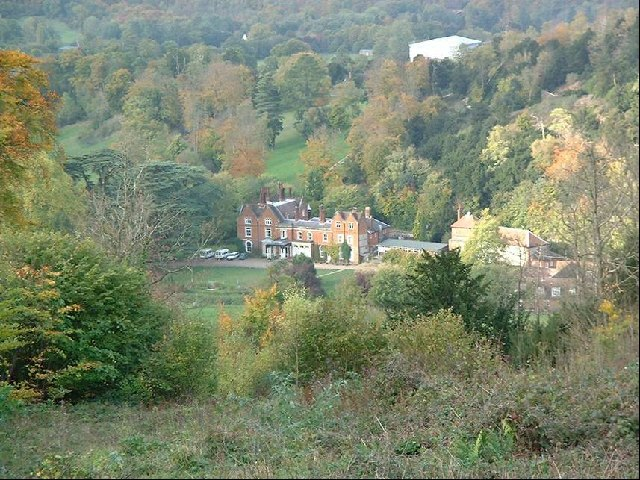
Juniper Hall, near Box Hill in Surrey, where Burney met Alexandre d'Arblay

In 1790–1791 Burney wrote four blank-verse tragedies: Hubert de Vere, The Siege of Pevensey, Elberta and Edwy and Elgiva, only the last of which was performed. One of a profusion of paintings and literary works about the early English king Eadwig (Edwy) and his wife Ælfgifu (Elgiva) to appear in the later 18th century, it met with public failure, playing in London for one night in March.

When the French Revolution began in 1789, Burney was among the many literary figures in England who sympathized with its early ideals of equality and social justice. During this period Burney became acquainted with some French exiles known as "Constitutionalists", who fled to England in August 1791 and were living at Juniper Hall, near Mickleham, Surrey, where Burney's sister Susanna lived. She quickly became close to General Alexandre d'Arblay (1754-1818), an artillery officer who had been adjutant-general to Lafayette. D'Arblay taught her French and introduced her to the writer Germaine de Staël.

Burney's father disapproved of d'Arblay's poverty, Catholicism, and ambiguous social status as an émigré. Nonetheless, she and d'Arblay were married on 28 July 1793 at St Michaels and All Angels Church in Mickleham. The same year she produced her pamphlet Brief Reflections relative to the Emigrant French Clergy. This short work resembled other pamphlets produced by French sympathisers in England, calling for financial support for the revolutionary cause. It is noteworthy for the way that Burney employed her rhetorical skills in the name of tolerance and human compassion. On 18 December 1794, Burney gave birth to a son, Alexander Charles Louis (died 19 January 1837), who took holy orders and became minister of Ely Chapel, London, and perpetual curate of Camden Town Chapel. Her sister Charlotte's remarriage in 1798 to the pamphleteer Ralph Broome caused her and her father further consternation, as did the move by her sister Susanna and penurious brother-in-law Molesworth Phillips and their family to Ireland in 1796.

== Camilla ==
Burney and her new husband, General Alexandre d'Arblay, were saved from poverty in 1796 by the publication of Burney's "courtesy novel" Camilla, or a Picture of Youth, a story of frustrated love and impoverishment. The first edition sold out; she made £1000 on the novel and sold the copyright for another £1000. This enabled them to build a house in Westhumble near Dorking in Surrey, which they called Camilla Cottage. Their life at this time was by all accounts happy, but the illness and death in 1800 of Burney's sister and close friend Susanna cast a shadow and ended a lifelong correspondence that had been the motive and basis for most of Burney's journal writing. However, she resumed her journal at the request of her husband, for the benefit of her son.

== Comedies ==
In the period 1797–1801 Burney wrote three comedies that remained unpublished in her lifetime: Love and Fashion, A Busy Day and The Woman Hater. The last is partly a reworking of subject-matter from The Witlings, but with fewer satirical elements and more emphasis on reforming her characters' faults. First performed in December 2007 at the Orange Tree Theatre in Richmond, it retains one of the central characters, Lady Smatter – an absent-minded but inveterate quoter of poetry, perhaps meant as a comic rendering of a Bluestocking. All other characters in The Woman Hater differ from those in The Witlings.

== Life in France: revolution and mastectomy ==
In 1801 d'Arblay was offered service with the government of Napoleon Bonaparte in France, and in 1802 Burney and her son followed him to Paris, where they expected to remain for a year. The outbreak of war between France and England overtook their visit and they remained there in exile for ten years. Although isolated from her family while in France, Burney was supportive of her husband's decision to move to Passy, outside Paris.

In August 1810 Burney developed pains in her breast, which her husband suspected could be due to breast cancer. Through her royal network, she was eventually treated by several leading physicians, and a year later, on 30 September 1811, underwent a mastectomy performed by "7 men in black, Dr. Larrey, M. Dubois, Dr. Moreau, Dr. Aumont, Dr. Ribe, & a pupil of Dr. Larrey, & another of M. Dubois". The operation was performed like a battlefield operation under the command of M. Dubois, then accoucheur (midwife or obstetrician) to the Empress Marie Louise and considered the best doctor in France. Burney later described the operation in detail, since she was conscious through most of it, as it took place before the development of anesthetics.

I mounted, therefore, unbidden, the Bed stead – & M. Dubois placed me upon the Mattress, & spread a cambric handkerchief upon my face. It was transparent, however, & I saw, through it, that the Bed stead was instantly surrounded by the 7 men & my nurse. I refused to be held; but when, Bright through the cambric, I saw the glitter of polished Steel – I closed my Eyes. I would not trust to convulsive fear the sight of the terrible incision. Yet – when the dreadful steel was plunged into the breast – cutting through veins – arteries – flesh – nerves – I needed no injunctions not to restrain my cries. I began a scream that lasted unintermittingly during the whole time of the incision – & I almost marvel that it rings not in my Ears still? so excruciating was the agony. When the wound was made, & the instrument was withdrawn, the pain seemed undiminished, for the air that suddenly rushed into those delicate parts felt like a mass of minute but sharp & forked poniards, that were tearing the edges of the wound. I concluded the operation was over – Oh no! presently the terrible cutting was renewed – & worse than ever, to separate the bottom, the foundation of this dreadful gland from the parts to which it adhered – Again all description would be baffled – yet again all was not over, – Dr. Larry rested but his own hand, & – Oh heaven! – I then felt the knife (rack)ling against the breast bone – scraping it!

Burney sent her account of this experience months later to her sister Esther without rereading it. It is impossible to know today whether the breast removed was indeed cancerous. She survived, and returned to England with her son in 1812 to visit her ailing father and to avoid her son's conscription into the French army. Charles Burney died in 1814, and she returned to France later that year after the Treaty of Paris had been concluded, to be with her husband.

In 1815 Napoleon escaped from Elba, and returned to power in France. D'Arblay, who was serving with the King's Guard, remained loyal to King Louis XVIII and became involved in the military actions that followed. Burney fled to Belgium. When her husband was wounded she joined him at Trèves (Trier) and together they returned to Bath in England, to live at 23 Great Stanhope Street. Burney wrote an account of this experience and of her Paris years in her Waterloo Journal of 1818–1832. D'Arblay was promoted to lieutenant-general, but died shortly afterwards of cancer, in 1818.

== The Wanderer and Memoirs of Dr Burney ==
Burney published her fourth novel, The Wanderer: Or, Female Difficulties, a few days before her father's death. "A story of love and misalliance set in the French Revolution", it criticises the English treatment of foreigners in the war years. It also criticizes the hypocritical social restriction put on women in general – as the heroine tries one means after another to earn an honest living – and the elaborate class criteria for social inclusion or exclusion. That strong social message sits uneasily within an unusual structure that might be called a melodramatic proto-mystery novel with elements of the picaresque. The heroine is no scallywag, but she is wilful and for obscure reasons refuses to reveal her name or origin. So as she darts about the South of England as a fugitive, she arouses suspicions.

Some parallels of plot and attitude have been drawn between The Wanderer and the early novels of Helen Craik, which she could have read in the 1790s.

Burney made £1500 from the first run, but the work disappointed her followers and did not go into a second English printing, although it met her immediate financial needs. Critics felt it lacked the insight of her earlier novels. It was reprinted in 1988 with an introduction by the novelist Margaret Drabble in the "Mothers of the Novel" series.

After her husband's death at 23 Great Stanhope Street, Bath, Burney moved to London to be nearer to her son, then a fellow at Christ's College. In homage to her father she gathered and in 1832 published in three volumes the Memoirs of Doctor Burney. These were written in a panegyric style, praising her father's accomplishments and character, and she drew on many of her own personal writings from years before to produce them. Protective of her father and the family reputation, she destroyed evidence of facts that were painful or unflattering and was soundly criticised by contemporaries and later by historians for doing so.

== Later life ==
Burney's son died in 1837 and her sister Charlotte Broome in 1838. While in Bath, Burney received visits from younger members of the Burney family, who found her a fascinating storyteller with a talent for imitating the personalities that she described. She continued to write often to members of her family.

Frances Burney died on 6 January 1840. She was buried with her son and her husband in Walcot cemetery in Bath. A gravestone was later erected in the churchyard of St Swithin's across the road, adjacent to that of Jane Austen's father, George Austen.

== Plaques and other memorials ==
In addition to the gravestone erected in the churchyard of St Swithin, Bath, other memorials and plaques record Burney's life.

A plaque on the wall at 84 High Street, King's Lynn, shows where she and her father lived in the 1750s.

In 1780, two years after the publication of Evelina, she stayed at 14 South Parade, Bath, with Mr and Mrs Thrale, who were great friends of Dr Johnson. A plaque on the wall of the house records her visit.

At 78 West Street, Brighton, Sussex a blue plaque records her visits to the Thrales' home there.

At Windsor Castle Wall, St Alban's Street, Windsor, a plaque records the residence of Mary Delaney between 1785 and 1788, where she was frequently visited by Burney.

A blue plaque on a wall in Chapel Lane, Westhumble, Surrey records the d'Arblays' life there in their cottage, 'Camilla', which they built and in which they lived between 1797 and 1801.

At St Margaret's Vicarage, St Margaret's Place, King's Lynn a blue plaque records Burney's regular visits there, where she observed the social life of Lynn.

Elizabeth Goudge's four-act play, "Fanny Burney" (in Three Plays: Suomi, The Brontës of Haworth, Fanny Burney: Gerald Duckworth, London, 1939) has scenes from the life of Frances Burney from 1768 to 1840. Under the title "Joy Will Come Back", the play was performed in London, in the Arts Theatre in 1937. Under the published title, "Fanny Burney", it was performed at Oldham, Lancashire, in 1949.

A Royal Society of Arts brown plaque records her period of residence at 11 Bolton Street, Mayfair.

On 13 June 2002 the Burney Society of North America and the Burney Society UK unveiled a memorial panel in the new Poets' Corner window in Westminster Abbey in memory of Frances Burney.

In 2013, a marble plaque was unveiled in the gallery of St Swithin's Church, Bath, to record Burney's life. This replaces two original plaques—one to her and one to her half-sister Sarah Harriet—that were lost. In 1958, the St Swithin's church authorities had sought to protect the plaques by removing them during renovations to the church organ, but they later disappeared.

== List of works ==
=== Novels ===
- The History of Caroline Evelyn, (ms. destroyed by author, 1767)
- Evelina: Or The History of A Young Lady's Entrance into the World, London, 1778
- Cecilia: Or, Memoirs of an Heiress, London, 1782
- Camilla: Or, A Picture of Youth, London, 1796, revised (shortened) 1802
- The Wanderer: Or, Female Difficulties, London: Longmans, 1814

=== Non-fiction ===
- Brief Reflections Relative to the French Emigrant Clergy. London, 1793
- Memoirs of Doctor Burney. London: Moxon, 1832

=== Posthumously published journals and letters ===
- The Early Diary of Frances Burney 1768–1778. 2 vols. Ed. Annie Raine Ellis. London: 1889
- Diary and Letters of Madame d'Arblay, 1778-1840. Edited by her niece [Charlotte Barrett]. In 7 vols. London: H. Colburn (1842–1846).
- The Diary and Letters of Madame d'Arblay. Ed. Austin Dobson. London: Macmillan, 1904
- Dr. Johnson & Fanny Burney [HTML at Virginia], by Fanny Burney. Ed. Chauncy Brewster Tinker. London: Jonathan Cape, 1912
- The Diary of Fanny Burney. Ed. Lewis Gibbs. London: Everyman, 1971

==== McGill University's Burney Centre Editions ====
- The Early Journals and Letters of Fanny Burney, 1768–1783. 5 vols. Vols. 1–2, ed. Lars Troide; Vol. 3, ed. Lars Troide and Stewart Cooke; Vol. 4, ed. Betty Rizzo; Vol. 5, ed. Lars Troide and Stewart Cooke.
- The Additional Journals and Letters of Frances Burney vol. 1 (1784–1786). Edited by Peter Sabor and Stewart Cooke, Oxford: Oxford University Press, 2015.
- The Court Journals and Letters of Frances Burney (1786-July 1791). In 6 vols. Oxford: Oxford University Press, 2011–2019.
- The Journals and Letters of Fanny Burney (Madame d'Arblay) 1791–1840, (12 vols.) Vols. I–VI, ed. Joyce Hemlow, with Patricia Boutilier and Althea Douglas; Vol. VII, ed. Edward A. and Lillian D. Bloom; Vol. VIII, ed. Peter Hughes; Vols. IX–X, ed. Warren Derry; Vols. XI–XII, ed. Joyce Hemlow with Althea Douglas and Patricia Hawkins. Oxford: Oxford University Press, 1972–1984.
- The Additional Journals and Letters of Frances Burney vol. 2 (1791-1840). Edited by Peter Sabor, Oxford: Oxford University Press, 2018.

=== Plays ===
- The Witlings, 1779 (satirical comedy)
- Edwy and Elgiva, 1790 (verse tragedy). Produced at Drury Lane, 21 March 1795
- Hubert de Vere, c. 1788–1791 (verse tragedy)
- The Siege of Pevensey, c. 1788–1791 (verse tragedy)
- Elberta, (fragment) 1788–1791? (verse tragedy)
- Love and Fashion, 1799 (satirical comedy)
- The Woman Hater, 1800–1801 (satirical comedy)
- A Busy Day, 1800–1801 (satirical comedy)
- The Complete Plays of Frances Burney, Peter Sabor, Geoffrey Sill, and Stewart Cooke editors, Montreal: McGill-Queen's University Press: 1995, Volume 1: Comedies, Volume 2: Tragedies

== General and cited references ==
- Michael E. Adelstein, Fanny Burney. New York: Twayne, 1968
- H. H. Asquith, "Fanny Burney", published privately by Sir Charles Russell, 1923
- Kate Chisholm, Fanny Burney: Her Life 1752-1840. London: Chatto & Windus, 1998. ISBN 978-0-701-16378-5
- Sophie Marie Coulombeau, 'New Perspectives on the Burney Family', Special issue of Eighteenth-Century Life 42, 2 (2018) ISSN 0098-2601
- Commire, Anne, and Deborah Klezmer. Women in World History: A biographical encyclopaedia. Waterford: Yorkin, 1999–2002
- D.D. Devlin, The Novels and Journals of Frances Burney. Hampshire: Macmillan, 1987
- Marianna D'Ezio, "Transcending National Identity: Paris and London in Frances Burney's Novels". Synergies Royaume-Uni et Irlande 3 (2010), pp. 59–74
- Margaret Anne Doody, Frances Burney: The Life in The Works. New Brunswick: Rutgers University Press, 1988
- Julia Epstein, The Iron Pen: Frances Burney and the Politics of Women's Writing. Madison: University of Wisconsin Press, 1989
- Mascha Gemmeke, Frances Burney and the Female Bildungsroman: An Interpretation of The Wanderer; or, Female Difficulties. Frankfurt/M: Peter Lang, 2004
- Claire Harman, Fanny Burney: A Biography. New York: Knopf, 2001
- Joyce Hemlow, The History of Fanny Burney. Oxford: Oxford University Press, 1958
- Francesca Saggini, Backstage in the Novel. Frances Burney and the Theater Arts. Charlottesville: University of Virginia Press, 2012
- Francesca Saggini, "The wolf, the lamb, and the big "Oh!”: voids, (w)holes, and epitaphic emptiness in Frances Burney's Hubert de Vere." Open Res Europe 2023, 3:138 (https://doi.org/10.12688/openreseurope.16439.1)
- Judy Simons, Diaries and Journals of Literary Women from Fanny Burney to Virginia Woolf. Hampshire: Macmillan, 1990
- Paula Stepankowsky, "Frances Burney d'Arblay". Dawson College.
- Fanny Burney, The Complete Plays of Frances Burney (Vol. 1: Comedies; Vol. 2: Tragedies), ed. Peter Sabor, Stewart Cooke, and Geoffrey Sill, Montreal: McGill-Queen's University Press, 1995 ISBN 0-7735-1333-7
- Fanny Burney, Journals and Letters. Ed. Peter Sabor and Lars E. Troide: Penguin Classics, 2001
- Fanny Burney, The Witlings and The Woman-Hater. Ed. Peter Sabor and Geoffrey Sill, Peterborough: Broadview Press, 2002
- "Burney, Fanny, 1752–1840." Literature Online Biography. Fredericton: University of New Brunswick. 3 December 2006
- "Burney, Fanny." Encyclopædia Britannica. Vol. 4, 1971
- "Burney, Fanny." The Bloomsbury Guide to Women's Literature. Ed. Claire Buck. London, New York: Prentice-Hall, 1992.
