= Evelina =

1778 novel by Frances Burney

Evelina: Or the History of a Young Lady's Entrance into the World
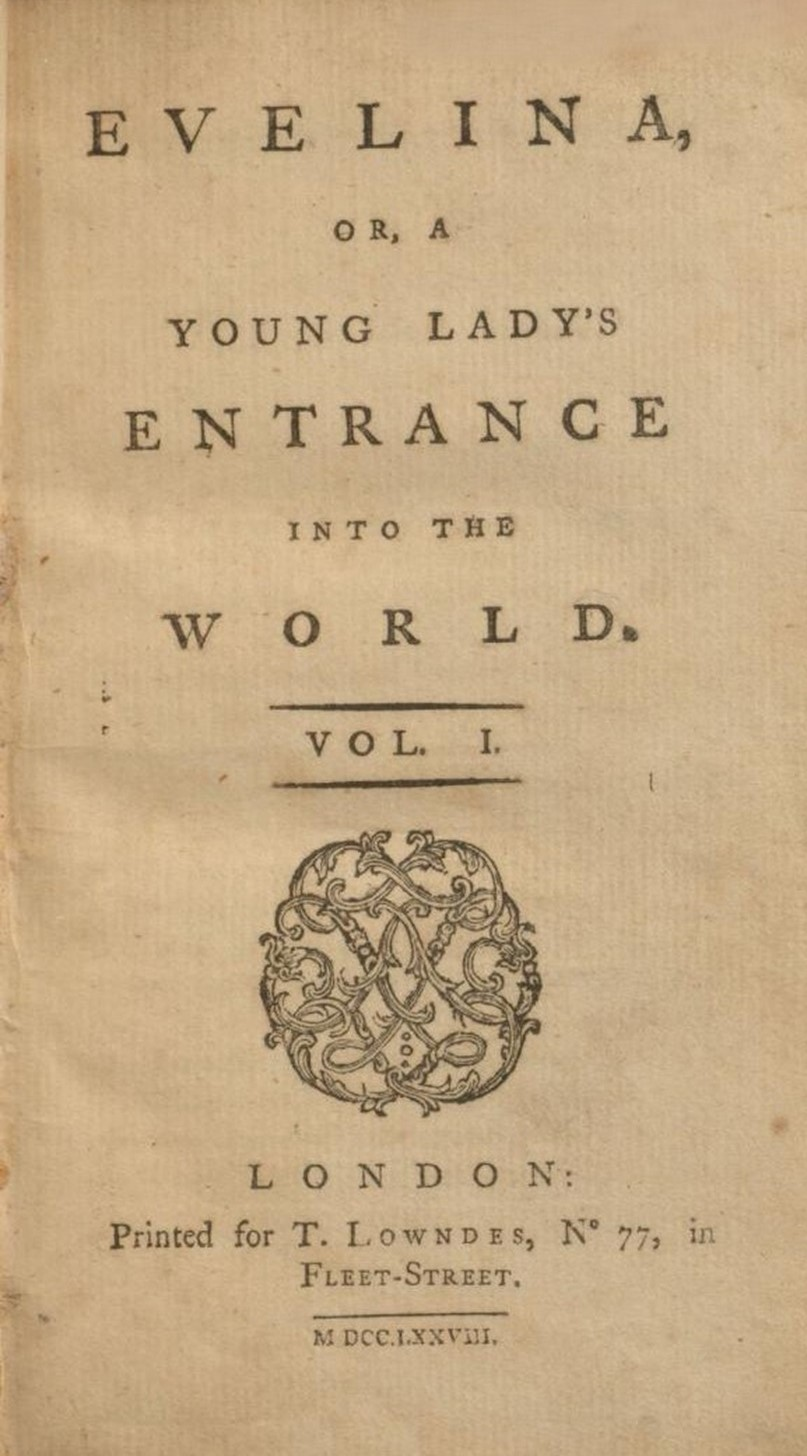
- First edition title page
- Author: Frances Burney
- Illustrator: John Mortimer
- Language: English
- Genre: Novel
- Publisher: Thomas Lowndes
- Publication date: 1778
- Publication place: United Kingdom
- Pages: 455

Evelina, or the History of a Young Lady's Entrance into the World is a novel written by English author Frances Burney and first published in 1778. Although published anonymously, its authorship was revealed by the poet George Huddesford in what Burney called a "vile poem".

In this 3-volume epistolary novel, title character Evelina is the unacknowledged but legitimate daughter of a dissipated English aristocrat, and thus raised in rural seclusion until her 17th year. Through a series of humorous events that take place in London and the resort town of Hotwells, near Bristol, Evelina learns to navigate the complex layers of 18th-century English society and come under the eye of a distinguished nobleman with whom a romantic relationship is formed in the latter part of the novel. This sentimental novel, which has notions of sensibility and early romanticism, satirizes the society in which it is set and is a significant precursor to the work of Jane Austen and Maria Edgeworth, whose novels explore many of the same issues.

== Plot summary ==
The novel opens with a distressed letter from Lady Howard to her longtime acquaintance, the Reverend Arthur Villars, in which she reports that Madame (Mme) Duval, the grandmother of Villars' ward, Evelina Anville, intends to visit England to renew her acquaintance with her granddaughter Evelina. Eighteen years earlier, Mme Duval had broken off her relationship with her daughter Caroline, Evelina's mother, but never knew of the birth or even existence of Evelina until Evelina was in her late teens. Upon this discovery, Mme Duval desires to reclaim Evelina and whisk her away to France as her closest blood relation. Reverend Villars fears Mme Duval's influence could lead Evelina to a fate similar to that of her mother Caroline, who secretly wedded Sir John Belmont, a libertine, who afterwards denied the marriage. To keep Evelina from Mme Duval, the Reverend lets her visit Howard Grove, Lady Howard's home, on an extended holiday. While she is there, the family learns that Lady Howard's son-in-law, naval officer Captain Mirvan, is returning to England after a seven-year absence. Desperate to join the Mirvans on their trip to London, Evelina entreats her guardian to let her attend with them, promising that the visit will last only one week. Villars reluctantly consents.

In London, Evelina's beauty and ambiguous social status attract unwanted attention and unkind speculation. Ignorant of the conventions and behaviours of 18th-century London society, she makes a series of humiliating (but humorous) faux pas that further expose her to social ridicule. She soon earns the attentions of two gentlemen: Lord Orville, a handsome and extremely eligible peer and pattern-card of modest, becoming behaviour; and Sir Clement Willoughby, a baronet with duplicitous intentions. Evelina's untimely reunion in London with her grandmother and the Branghtons, her long-unknown extended family, along with the embarrassment their boorish, social-climbing antics cause, soon convince Evelina that Lord Orville is completely out of reach.

The Mirvans finally return to the country, taking Evelina and Mme Duval with them. Spurred by Evelina's greedy cousins, Mme Duval concocts a plan to sue Sir John Belmont, Evelina's father, and force him to recognize his daughter's claim to his estate in court. Reverend Villars is displeased, and they decide against a lawsuit, but Lady Howard still writes to Sir John Belmont, who responds unfavourably. He does not believe it possible for Evelina to be his daughter, as he already has a young lady who is his supposed daughter (who, unbeknownst to him is actually illegitimate), and therefore assumes Mme Duval to be trying to dupe him for his money.

Mme Duval is furious and threatens to rush Evelina back to Paris to pursue the lawsuit. A second compromise sees Evelina return to London with her grandmother, where she is forced to spend time with her ill-bred Branghton cousins and their rowdy friends, but she is distracted by Mr. Macartney, a melancholy and direly-poor Scottish poet. Finding him with a pair of pistols, she supposed him to be considering suicide and bids him to look to his salvation; later he informs her that he has been contemplating not only self-destruction but more-so highway robbery. He is in dreadful financial straits, is engaged in tracing his own obscure parentage, as well as recovering from his mother's sudden death and the discovery that his beloved is actually his sister. Evelina charitably gives him her purse. Otherwise, her time with the Branghtons is uniformly mortifying: during her visit to the Marylebone pleasure garden, for instance, she is attacked by a drunken sailor and accosted by several rowdy men before being rescued by prostitutes—and in this humiliating company, she meets Lord Orville again. Sure that he can never respect her now, she is stunned when he seeks her out in London's unfashionable section and seems interested in renewing their acquaintance. When an insulting and brash letter supposedly from Lord Orville devastates her and makes her believe she misperceived him, she returns home to Berry Hill and falls ill.

Slowly recuperating from her illness, Evelina agrees to accompany her neighbour, a sarcastically tempered widow named Mrs. Selwyn, to the resort town of Clifton Heights, where she unwillingly attracts the attention of womanizer Lord Merton, on the eve of his marriage to Lord Orville's sister, Lady Louisa Larpent. Aware of Lord Orville's arrival, Evelina tries to distance herself from him because of his impertinent letter, but his gentle manners work their spell until she is torn between attraction to him and belief in his past duplicity.

The unexpected appearance of Mr. Macartney reveals an unexpected streak of jealousy in the seemingly imperturbable Lord Orville. Convinced that Macartney is a rival for Evelina's affections, Lord Orville withdraws. However, Macartney has intended only to repay his financial debt to Evelina.

Lord Orville's genuine affection for Evelina and her assurances that she and Macartney are not involved finally win out over Orville's jealousy, and he secures a meeting between Evelina and Macartney. It appears that all doubts have been resolved between Lord Orville and Evelina, especially when Mrs. Selwyn informs her that she overheard Lord Orville arguing with Sir Clement Willoughby about the latter's inappropriate attentions to Evelina. Lord Orville proposes, much to Evelina's delight. However, Evelina is distraught at the continuing gulf between herself and her father and the mystery surrounding his false daughter. Finally, Mrs. Selwyn is able to secure a surprise meeting with Sir John. When he sees Evelina, he is horrified and guilt-stricken because she clearly resembles her mother, Caroline. This means that the other Miss Belmont (the false daughter) is recognized as a fraud. Evelina is able to ease his guilt with her repeated gentle pardons and the delivery of a letter written by her mother on her deathbed in which she forgives Sir John for his behaviour if he will remove her ignominy (by acknowledging their marriage) and acknowledge Evelina as his legitimate daughter.

Mrs Clifton, Berry Hill's longtime housekeeper, is able to reveal the second Miss Belmont's parentage. She identifies Polly Green, Evelina's former wet nurse, mother of a girl 6 weeks older than Evelina, as the perpetrator of the fraud. Polly has been passing her own daughter off as that of Sir John and Caroline for the past 18 years, hoping to secure a better future for her. Ultimately, Lord Orville suggests that the unfortunate girl be named co-heiress with Evelina; kindhearted Evelina is delighted.

Finally, Sir Clement Willoughby writes to Evelina, confessing that he had written the insulting letter (she had already suspected this), hoping to separate Evelina and Lord Orville. In Paris, Mr. Macartney is reunited with the false Miss Belmont, his former beloved: separated by Sir John, at first because Macartney was too poor and lowly to marry his purported daughter, and then because his affair with Macartney's mother would have made the sweethearts brother and sister, they are now able to marry because Miss "Belmont"'s true parentage has been revealed and the two are not related at all. They are married in a joint ceremony alongside Evelina and Lord Orville, who decide to visit Reverend Villars at Berry Hill for their honeymoon trip.

== Characters ==
- Miss Evelina Anville, the novel's main character, is the daughter of Lady Caroline Belmont (born Caroline Evelyn) and Sir John Belmont. A series of letters convey the story, and she summarizes specific experiences of her life, mainly to her guardian/pseudo-father Reverend Villars. She embodies the desirable traits for women at the time. Although she is called a social "nobody" by the fop Mr. Lovel, other characters have high opinions of her. She is deemed "a very pretty modest-looking girl" by Lord Orville and an "angel" by Sir Clement in the first volume. The novel traces her trials and tribulations and growing confidence in her own abilities and discernment.
- Reverend Arthur Villars is the man who raised Evelina as his own and refers to her as the "child of his heart." He is her tutor and guardian, as well as Evelina's father figure in the novel. Taking in the disgraced Lady Belmont (Caroline), he vowed to be the protector of her child. He is Evelina's moral guide and confidant throughout the novel.
- Sir Clement Willoughby is a minor nobleman (baronet). Evelina meets him at the infamous Ridotto during her first visit to London. A steadfast pursuer of Evelina's good favour, he courts her very forwardly with flamboyant proclamations and flattering speeches. Evelina dislikes him, only tolerating him because he curries favour with Captain Mirvan and Mrs. Selwyn. He also accompanies Captain Mirvan whenever he assaults, provokes, or teases Madame Duval.
- Lord Orville is a fine gentleman and earl who rescues Evelina on several occasions, including from the advances of Sir Clement. He falls into her good graces simply by conducting himself in a manner befitting his rank and person. He is open, engaging, gentle, attentive, and expressive.
- Captain Mirvan is a retired navy captain who despises foreigners and constantly annoys Madame Duval. Husband of Mrs. Mirvan and father of Maria, he sometimes greatly embarrasses his family (or so Evelina perceives).
- Mrs. Mirvan is a woman who shows much compassion and concern for Evelina. She looks after her during her visits to London and Howard Grove, treating Evelina as her second child.
- Miss Maria Mirvan is a childhood friend of Evelina's, her true companion and confidante.
- Mme Duval is Evelina's English grandmother, who pretends to be French. She wants to take Evelina to France, away from English influence in general and Rev. Villars in particular. She is stubborn and ignorant; therefore, she is repugnant to Evelina.
- M. Dubois is Madame Duval's companion. He speaks only French and some broken English. Evelina bonds with him during her second residence in London because comparisons to her lowly Branghton cousins elevate her opinion of him. Unfortunately, this encourages him to make unwanted advances that infuriate Mme Duval. Captain Mirvan nicknames him "Monseer Slippery" because he once slipped in mud while carrying Mme Duval.
- The Branghtons are Evelina's London relations, a mercantile family who own a silversmith's shop in High Holborn. Evelina must associate with them on her second visit to London; she grows impatient with their crass behaviour and is embarrassed to be thought of as in their party, especially when she meets Lord Orville in their company. The Misses Branghton are jealous of the attention their own beaux give Evelina; their brother eventually attempts, unsuccessfully, to propose to Evelina through Mme Duval.
- Mr. Macartney is an impoverished Scottish poet who boards with the Branghtons and is the butt of many of their contemptuous jokes. Evelina rescues him during what she perceives to be a suicide attempt; he later revealed he had been unable to decide between that and armed robbery. This desperate action had been brought on by his mother's death and the discovery that his beloved was actually his unacknowledged sister. When the young woman's actual parentage is revealed, they are able to marry. He is Evelina's half-brother as his father is Sir John Belmont.
- Lord Merton first met Evelina at an assembly. He is reintroduced to her later in Bristol as the fiancé of Lord Orville's sister. Along with his companion, Mr. Coverly, Lord Merton reveals himself to be a drunken, gambling rake.
- Mr. Lovel is Evelina's rejected dance partner from her first assembly. Though he realizes her action of accepting another dance partner (Lord Orville) after refusing him is due to her lack of knowledge about society, he is furious and seizes every opportunity to embarrass her.

== Publication history ==
- 1778, UK, Thomas Lowndes, hardback in three vols. (1st edn.). This is possibly the version lent to and read by the Anglican clergyman and diarist James Woodforde, who called the work “very clever and sensible.”
- 1898, Newnes, London. Illustrations by Arthur Rackham.
- 1906, US, The Century Company, hardback.
- 1909, UK/US, J. M. Dent (London)/E. P. Dutton (New York) (Everyman's Library #352), reprinted through at least 1950, hardback with jacket.
- 1994, UK, Penguin Books (ISBN 0140433473), paperback.
- 1997, US, Bedford/St. Martin's (ISBN 978-0-312-09729-5), paperback (ed. by Kristina Straub).
- 1998, US, W. W. Norton (ISBN 0393971589), paperback (ed. by Stewart Cooke).
- 2000, Canada, Broadview Press (ISBN 155111237X), paperback.
- 2002, UK, Oxford World Classics (ISBN 0-19-284031-2), paperback (ed. by Edward A. Bloom with annotations by Vivien Jones)
- 2003, US, Indypublish.com (ISBN 1404359885), hardback.
- 2006, US, The Echo Library (ISBN 1406800910), hardback.

== Sources ==
- Martha Gleaton Brown, Fanny Burney's Three Eighteenth-Century Romances: "Evelina", "Cecelia", and "Camilla," Greensboro, N.C., 1980
- Eighteenth Century Literature Guides
