= 1773 in literature =

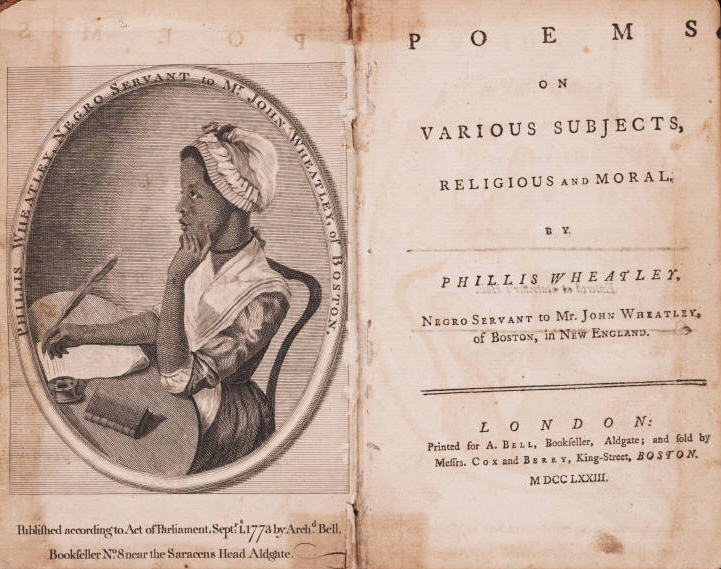
Front cover of Poems on Various Subjects, Religious and Moral by Phillis Wheatley, the first book written by a black woman to be published in the Americas. (Published 1773)

This article contains information about the literary events and publications of 1773.

== Events ==
- January – Christoph Martin Wieland begins publishing the influential literary monthly Der Teutsche Merkur in Weimar.
- March 15 – Oliver Goldsmith's comedy She Stoops to Conquer is performed for the first time, at the Covent Garden Theatre in London.
- April 13 – Richard Brinsley Sheridan marries singer and actress Elizabeth Ann Linley.
- May 1 – Richard Wroughton takes the role of Prince Henry in Henry II, King of England by John Bancroft at Covent Garden.
- May 4 – Eibhlín Dubh Ní Chonaill composes the keen Caoineadh Airt Uí Laoghaire over the body of her husband Art Ó Laoghaire.
- August 6 – Samuel Johnson sets out for Scotland, where on August 14 he meets James Boswell in Edinburgh for their tour to the Hebrides.
- September 1 – Poems on Various Subjects, Religious and Moral by Phillis Wheatley (described as "Negro Servant to Mr. John Wheatley, of Boston, in New England"), the first work of an African American female writer to be published in English, including "On Being Brought from Africa to America", is published in Aldgate, London by Archibald Bell, bookseller, because publishers in Boston, Massachusetts, had declined to publish it and Wheatley and her master's son, Nathanial Wheatley, had come to London where Selina, Countess of Huntingdon and the Earl of Dartmouth helped with the publication.
- unknown dates
  - Cláudio Manuel da Costa writes his epic poem Vila Rica, relating the history of the homonymous Brazilian city, modern-day Ouro Preto; it is not published until 1839.
  - The last five cantos of Friedrich Gottlieb Klopstock's epic poem Der Messias are published in Hamburg.
  - Compilation of the Complete Library of the Four Treasuries begins in Qing Dynasty China. The Wenjin Chamber is built at the Chengde Mountain Resort to accommodate a copy.

== New books ==
=== Fiction ===
- Elizabeth Bonhote – The Fashionable Friend
- Calixto Bustamante Carlos (Concolorcorvo) – Lazarillo de ciegos caminantes
- José Cadalso – Cartas marruecas (Moroccan letters)
- Mrs Fogerty – The Fatal Connexion
- Richard Graves – The Spiritual Quixote
- Henry Mackenzie – The Man of the World
- Johann Karl Wezel – Lebensgeschichte Tobias Knauts, des Weisen, sonst der Stammler genannt: aus Familiennachrichten gesammelt (Life story of Tobias Knaut the Wise, Otherwise Called the Stammerer; publication begins)

=== Drama ===
- Charles Dibdin – The Deserter
- Johann Wolfgang von Goethe – Götz von Berlichingen
- Oliver Goldsmith – She Stoops to Conquer
- Thomas Hawkins – The Origin of the English Drama
- John Home – Alonzo
- William Kenrick – The Duellist
- Henry Mackenzie – The Prince of Tunis
- Arthur Murphy – Alzuma
- Mercy Otis Warren – The Adulateur
- George Steevens (editor) – The Plays of William Shakespeare
- Francis Godolphin Waldron – The Maid of Kent

=== Poetry ===
- Anna Laetitia Barbauld – Poems
- John Bicknell and Thomas Day – The Dying Negro
- José Cadalso – Ocios de mi juventud
- Robert Fergusson
  - Poems
  - Auld Reikie
- Richard Graves – The Love of Order
- Edward Jerningham – Faldoni and Teresa
- George Keate – The Monument in Arcadia
- James Macpherson – The Iliad
- Hannah More – A Search After Happiness
- Thomas Scott – Lyric Poems
- Phillis Wheatley – Poems on Various Subjects, Religious and Moral
- John Wolcot – Persian Love Elegies

=== Non-fiction ===
- Anna Laetitia Barbauld and John Aikin – Miscellaneous Pieces
- Patrick Brydone – A Tour Through Sicily and Malta
- James Burnett, Lord Monboddo – Of the Origin and Progress of Language
- Charles Burney – The Present State of Music in Germany, the Netherlands, and United Provinces
- José Cadalso – Apuntaciones autobiográficas
- Hester Chapone – Letters on the Improvement of the Mind
- David Dalrymple, Lord Hailes – Remarks on the History of Scotland
- Antoine Court de Gébelin – Le Monde primitif (publication begins)
- John Hawkesworth – An Account of the Voyages for Making Discoveries in the Southern Hemisphere
- Thomas Hawkins – The Origin of the English Drama
- Tomás de Iriarte – Los literatos en Cuaresm`
- Samuel Johnson – A Dictionary of the English Language, revised edition
- Thomas Leland – The History of Ireland, from the invasion of Henry II
- William Melmoth – Cato
- Louis-Sébastien Mercier – L'Essai sur l'art dramatique
- John Scott – Observations on the Present State of the Parochial and Vagrant Poor

== Births ==
- April 9 – Étienne Aignan, French translator, librettist and dramatist (died 1824 in literature)
- May 19 – Jean Charles Léonard de Sismondi, Swiss scholar of literature, history and economics (died 1842)
- August 21 – Jens Christian Djurhuus, Faroese poet (died 1853)
- October 23 – Francis Jeffrey, Scottish jurist and critic (died 1850)
- December 9 – Marianne Ehrenström, Swedish musician and writer (died 1867)
- unknown date – Margaret Prior, American humanitarian, missionary, social reformer, memoirist (died 1842)

== Deaths ==
- January 21 – Alexis Piron, French dramatist and epigrammatist (born 1689)
- April 20 – Hubert-François Gravelot, French book illustrator (born 1699)
- April 25 – Daniele Farlati, ecclesiastical historian (born 1690)
- May 15 – Alban Butler, hagiographer (born 1710)
- July 5 – Francisco José Freire, Portuguese historian and philologist (born 1719)
- August 3 – Stanisław Konarski, Polish political writer, poet and dramatist (born 1700)
- August 20 – Enrique Florez, Spanish historian (born 1729)
- August 28 – John Ranby, English surgeon and writer on surgery (born 1703)
- September 18 – John Cunningham, Irish poet, dramatist and actor (born 1729)
- November 16 – John Hawkesworth, English poet and editor (born c. 1715)
- unknown date – Paisius of Hilendar, Bulgarian historian and clergyman, early figure in the Bulgarian National Revival (born 1722)
