= Wellclose Square =

Square in the London Borough of Tower Hamlets

Coordinates: 51.5101°N 0.0665°W

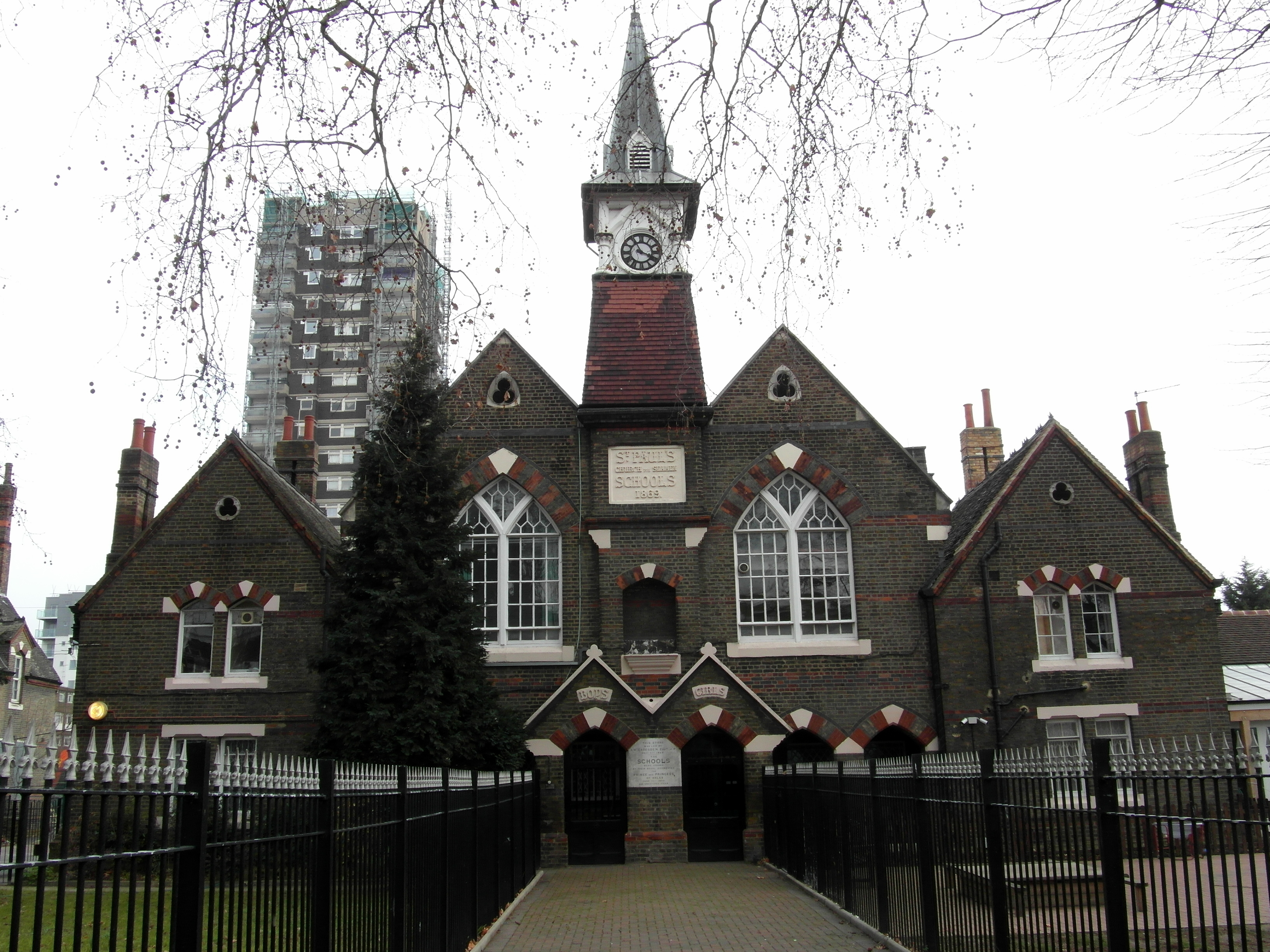
St Paul's Whitechapel Church of England Primary School, Wellclose Square

Wellclose Square is a public square in the London Borough of Tower Hamlets, between Cable Street to the north and The Highway to the south.

The western edge, now called Ensign Street, was previously called Well Street. The southern edge was called Neptune street. On the north side is Graces Alley, home to Wilton's Music Hall. The centre of the square is occupied by St Paul's Whitechapel Church of England Primary School, the only major building to survive which predates the redevelopment of the square in the 1960s. On the western edge is another primary school.

== Early history ==
The Abbey of St Mary Graces stood near Tower Hill until the dissolution of the monasteries. An old map shows a river running down each side of "Nightingall Lane" (now called Thomas More Street). In 1954 Kenneth Reid suggested this was one of London's "lost rivers" and that it ran from Well Street into the Thames.

Daniel Defoe mentions the square is his book A Tour thro' the Whole Island of Great Britain (1724). He says that there used to be a well in the centre of the square. It was also known as Goodman's Field's Well.

== Governance ==
Wellclose Square was part of the ancient parish of Stepney. This was later divided into Whitechapel (by 1329), Wapping (1694) and St George in the East (1729). The boundaries of the parishes met in Wellclose Square.

In 1686 the Tower Liberty was extended beyond the Tower of London to include Minories, the Old Artillery Ground and Wellclose. The word "Wellclose" was used to indicate the whole area until the middle of the nineteenth century.

== Notable persons ==
Caius Gabriel Cibber was the architect of the Danish church, built in the centre of the Square in 1696. He was the father of the playwright Colley Cibber. According to the website www.poetsgravesco.uk, Colley Cibber was buried in either this church or Grosvenor Chapel, Mayfair. The church was demolished in 1870. The Danish Church was depicted in paintings many times.

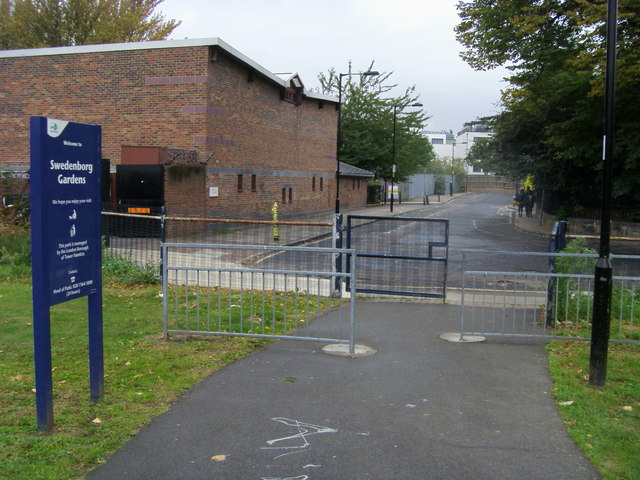
Swedenborg Gardens

The scientist and mystic Emanuel Swedenborg (1688–1772) lived in the square during the last year of his life. When Swedenborg came from Sweden to London in 1710, he attended the Swedish church in Princes Square, which used to be located to the east of Wellclose Square. The area is now called Swedenborg Gardens, and the tower block overlooking Wellclose Square is called Stockholm House. Swedenborg arrived in the same year as the Ulrika Eleonora Church was built in Princes Square. He was buried there. It closed in 1910, and in 1912/13 his remains were transferred to Uppsala Cathedral in Sweden. The church was demolished in 1921.

Hayyim Samuel Jacob Falk (1708–1782), a Rabbi and Kabbalist, moved to Wellclose Square in 1742 after narrowly escaping being burnt at the stake by the authorities in Westphalia who charged him with sorcery. He was known as the "Baal Shem of London" because of his reputation as a practical Kabbalist who worked miracles and appeared to have magical powers.

Thomas Day (1748–1789) was born in Wellclose Square. He was a poet who wrote, with John Bicknell, The Dying Negro about the death of a runaway slave. Later he wrote The History of Sandford and Merton (1783).

John Thomas Quekett (1815 - 1861) was a pioneering histologist. His brother Edwin lived at 50 Wellclose Square. John moved in with his brother. In 1839 John founded the Royal Microscopical Society. He was conservator of the Hunterian Museum until his death. Dr Nathaniel Bagshaw Ward (1791 - 1868) invented the terrarium (a dry version of an aquarium). He invented it about 1829, because his ferns were being poisoned by the London air. It also went by the name Wardian case.

Starting in 1857, William Smith and Charles Eaton made lead-cast forgeries of antiquities. The letters were meaningless jumbles, which made them easy to detect as forgeries. A dealer in the City Road bought many of these Shadwell forgeries. Eaton died in 1879 in Wellclose Square.

== Notable places ==
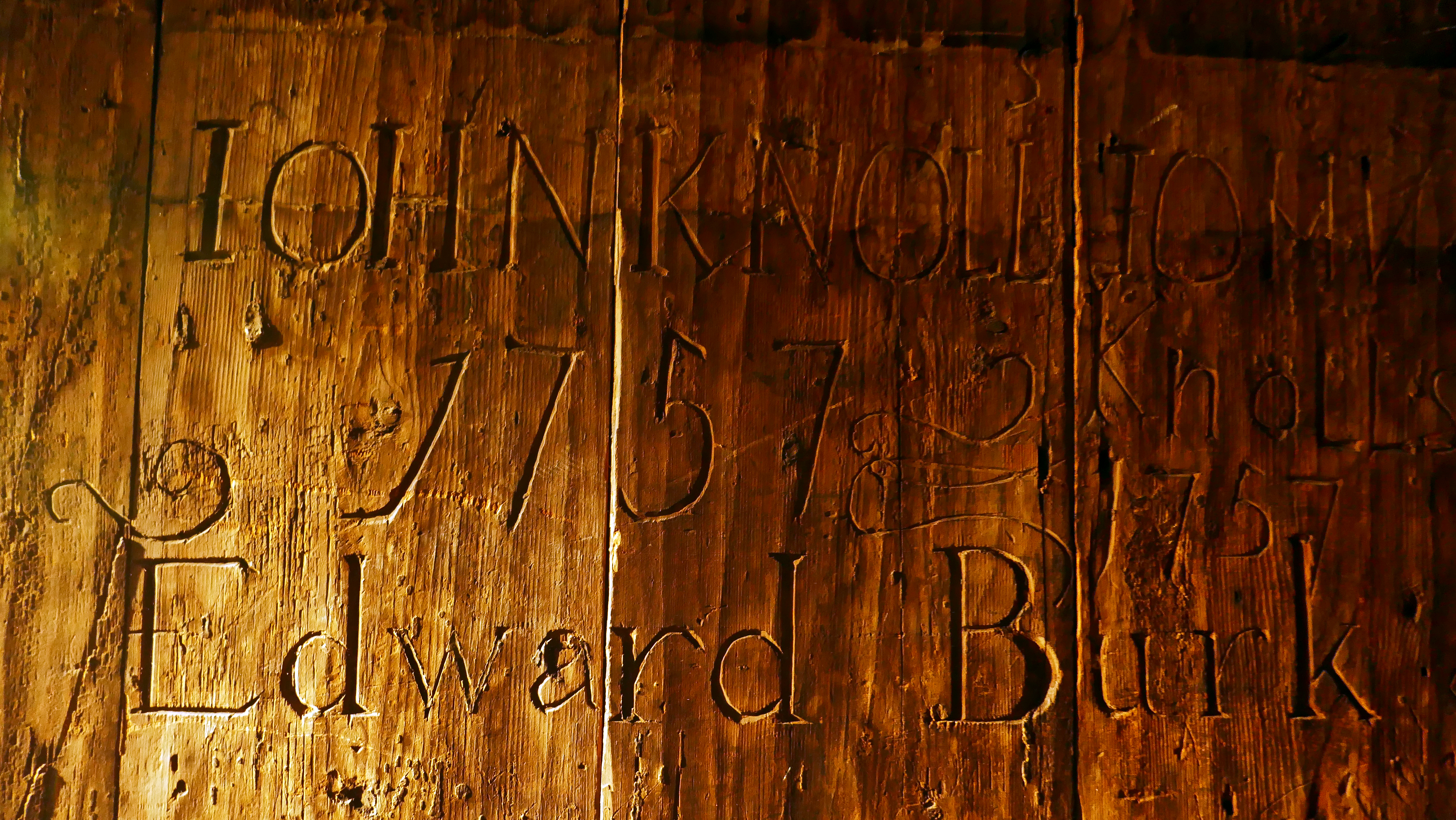
Wellclose prison cell wall, with graffiti dated 1757, preserved at the Museum of London.

There are unusual bollards on Ensign Street, with the mark "RBT". The initials stand for "Royal Brunswick Theatre". The Royalty was built there in 1787 by John Palmer. John Braham (1774–1856) sang at the Royalty in the same year that it opened, at the age of 14. It was burnt down in 1828. The "Royal Brunswick" was built in its place in 1828. It collapsed almost as soon as it had been built, on 28 February 1828.

The Neptune Street Prison became familiarly known in the district as 'The Sly House'. Also known as Wellclose prison, its remaining structures have now been preserved inside the Museum of London, where one can see the names of prisoners, scratched on the wooden wall panels by prisoners using pine cones.

St Paul’s Whitechapel Church of England Primary School was opened in 1870.

== Red Ensign club ==
Following the destruction of the "Royal Brunswick Theatre" Rev George Smith of the Methodist Mariners church on Dock Street decided to build a sailors' home on the site. It was founded in 1830 and opened in 1835, with accommodation for 100 sailors. This was later expanded to 500. The main entrance was originally on Well Street, but later changed to be on Dock Street. The London Nautical School opened here in 1893. In 1955 it was modernised and renamed the "Red Ensign Club". Following the decline of the British Merchant Fleet, it closed in 1974 and is now a youth club. Well Street was renamed Ensign Street in honour of the hostel. According to John Stape's biography The Several Lives of Joseph Conrad, Conrad first lived in this sailor's home at the age of 21, and returned several times. There was a sugar refinery at the bottom of Dock Street and Well Street. It is mentioned by Charles Dickens in The Uncommercial Traveller. According to Roy Palmer, one version of the sea shanty "Tiger Bay" makes reference to "Well Street", and suggests it was the one by Wellclose Square. (see The Oxford Book of Sea Songs 1986).

== In popular culture ==
Stephen Knight's 1979 true crime book Jack the Ripper: The Final Solution suggests that there was plot by Freemasons to kill prostitutes within "200 cubits" of Wellclose Square. The evidence was quickly and thoroughly demolished by historians, and on his deathbed, Knight admitted he had been wrong.
