= Shadwell forgeries =

Mid-19th century forgeries of mediaeval lead artefacts

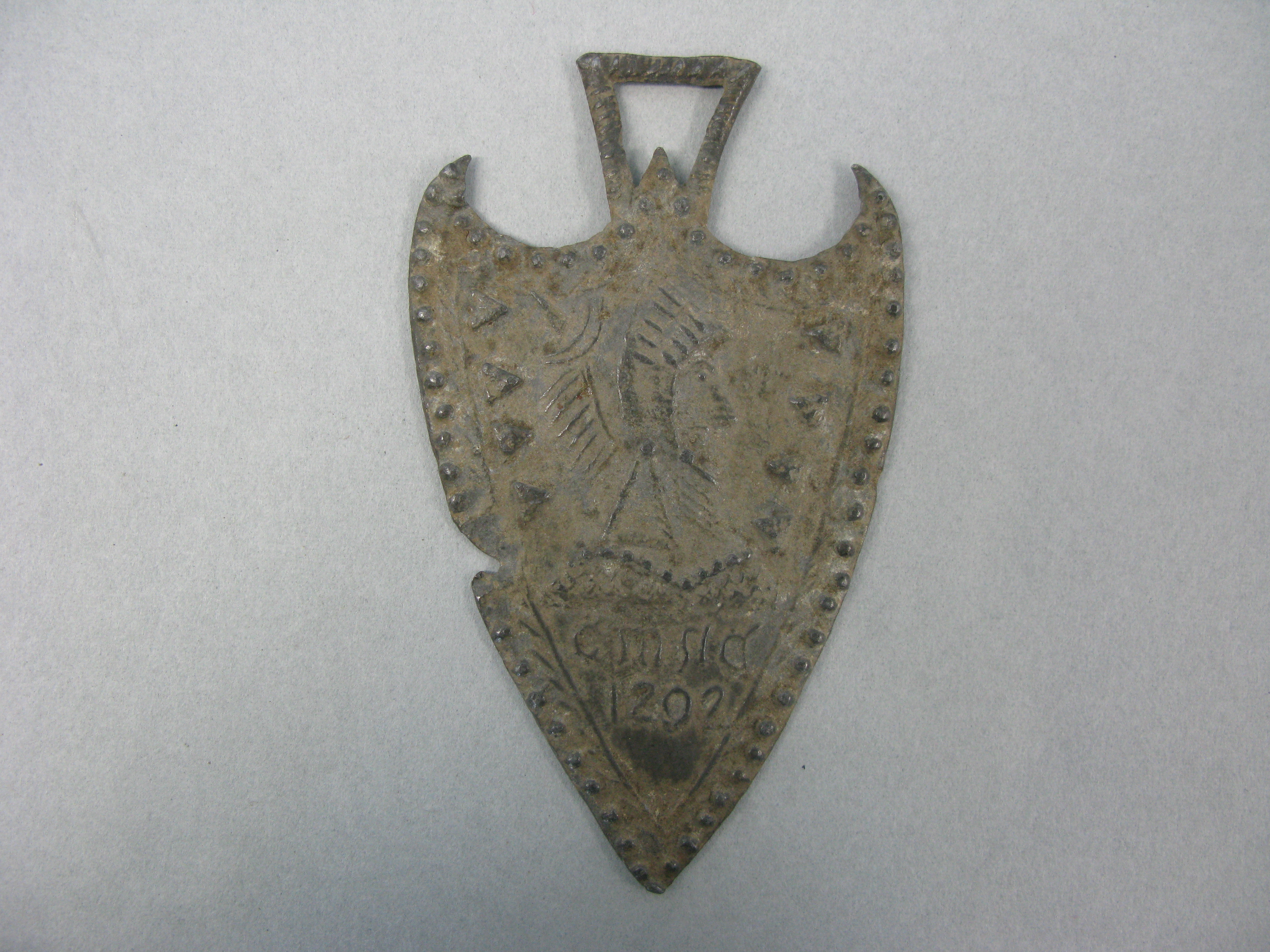
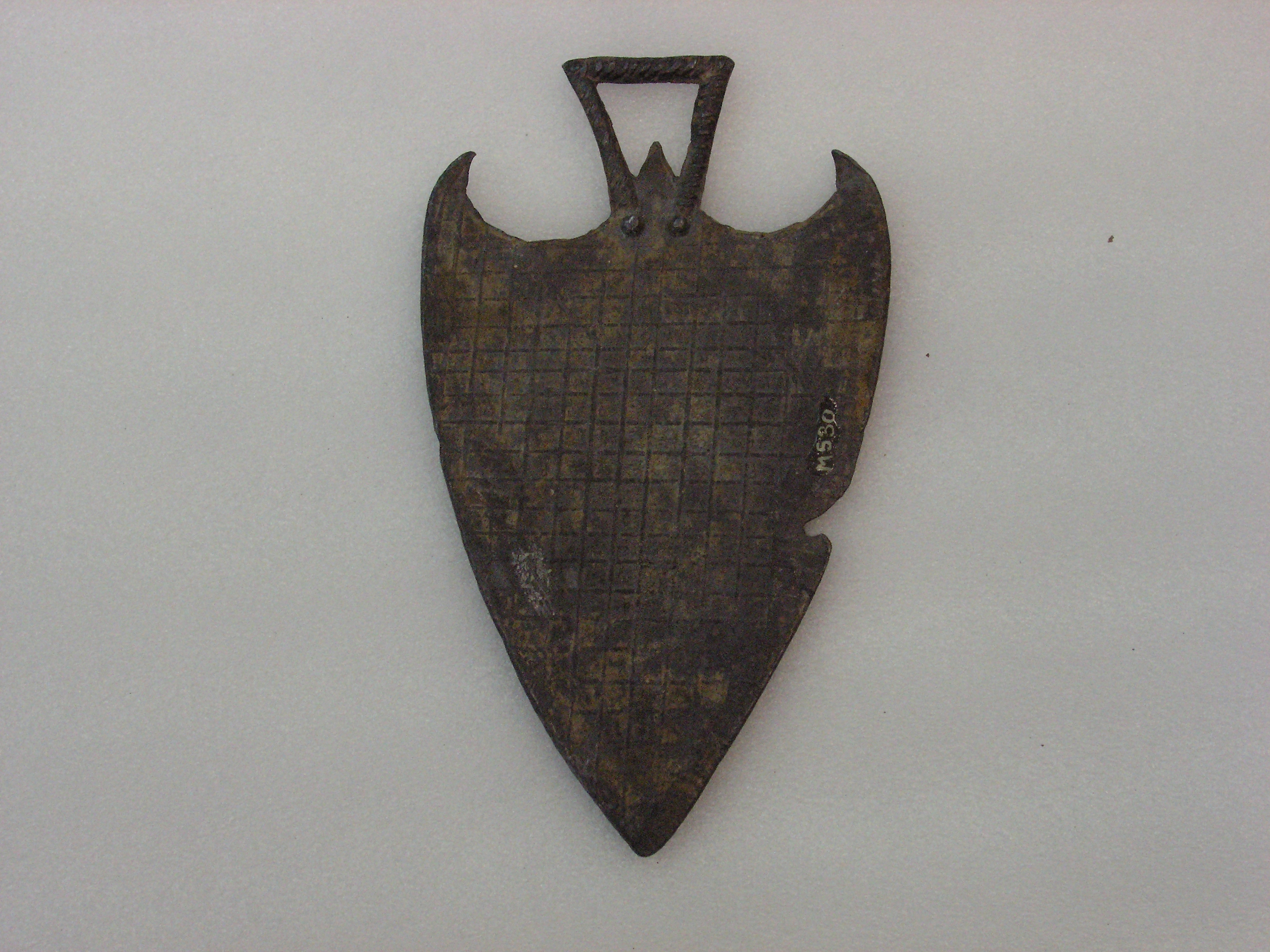
The obverse and reverse sides of a Billy and Charley in the form of a lead plaque, 130 by 75 millimetres (5.1 by 3.0 in). The obverse carries the profile, head of a man and the purported date of "1292"; the reverse side is a simple, crosshatch pattern. Auckland War Memorial Museum, accession number 1932.434

The Shadwell forgeries, most commonly known as Billy and Charley Forgeries, or "Billys and Charleys", but also called Shadwell Dock forgeries, were mid-19th-century forgeries of medieval lead and lead-alloy artefacts. The name "Billy and Charley" derives from William "Billy" Smith and Charles "Charley" Eaton, who were responsible for the large-scale manufacture of the objects between 1857 and 1870. Some leading antiquarians were fooled by the forgeries, despite their being crudely made, due to Smith and Eaton's limited metalworking skills and illiteracy.

Today, Billy and Charleys are sometimes viewed as examples of naïve art or outsider art. Some museums hold collections of them and they have become sought-after collectible items in their own right. It has been alleged that modern fake Billy and Charleys are in circulation, although it is uncertain if this is true.

== William Smith and Charles Eaton ==
Little is known of the lives of William Smith (dates unknown) and Charles Eaton (c.1834–1870) except that when young they were mudlarks; individuals that made a living by searching the mudflats of the River Thames at low-tide, seeking any item of value. They lived in Rosemary Lane (now called Royal Mint Street) in what is now part of the London Borough of Tower Hamlets.

In 1844 or 1845, Smith came into contact with an antique dealer, William Edwards. Eaton met Edwards some years later. Edwards came to view the pair as "his boys" and frequently bought from them items of interest they found while mudlarking.

== Forgeries ==
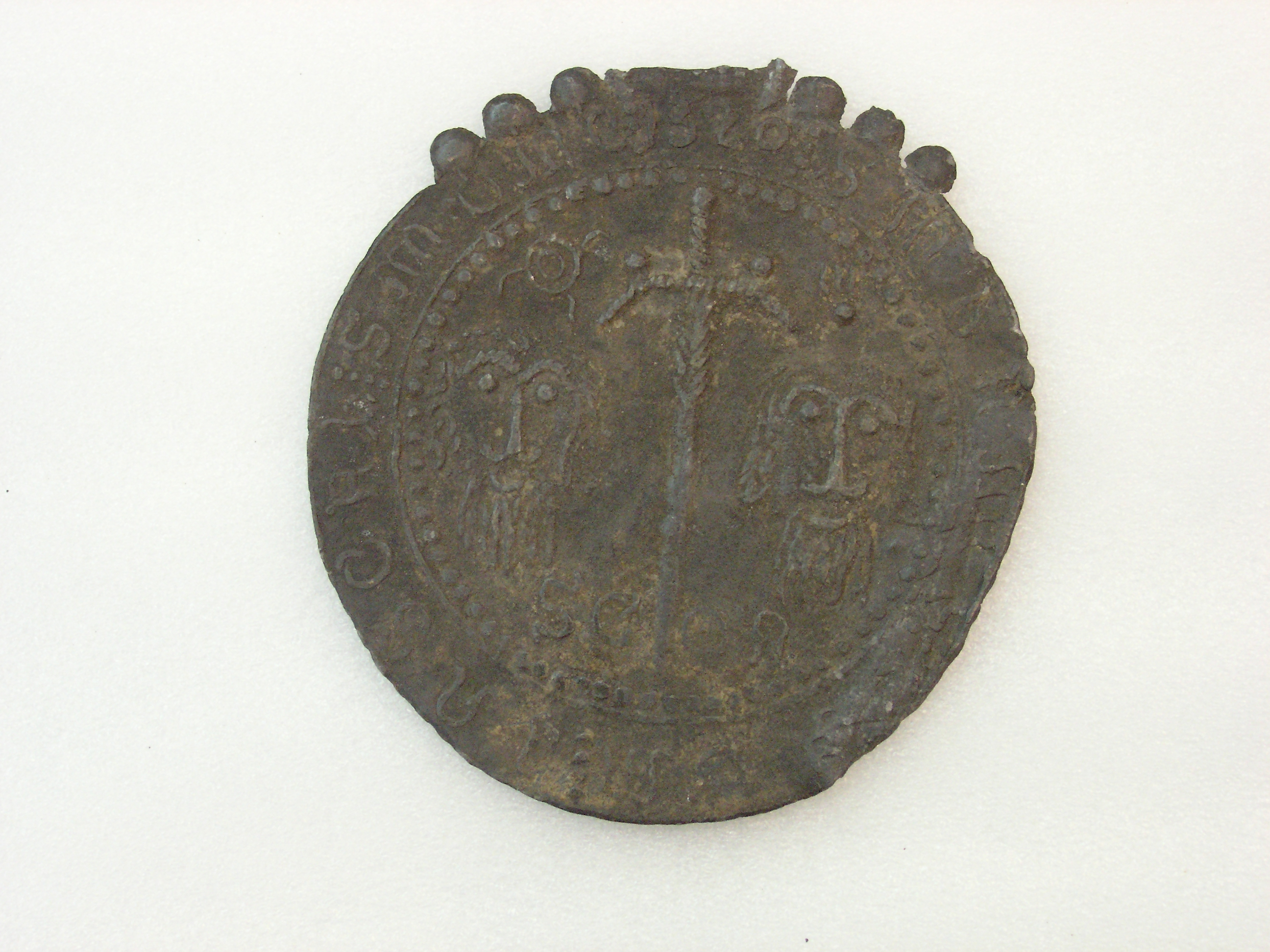
A Billy and Charley lead plaque. 95 by 90 millimetres (3.7 by 3.5 in) Auckland War Memorial Museum, accession number 1932.427

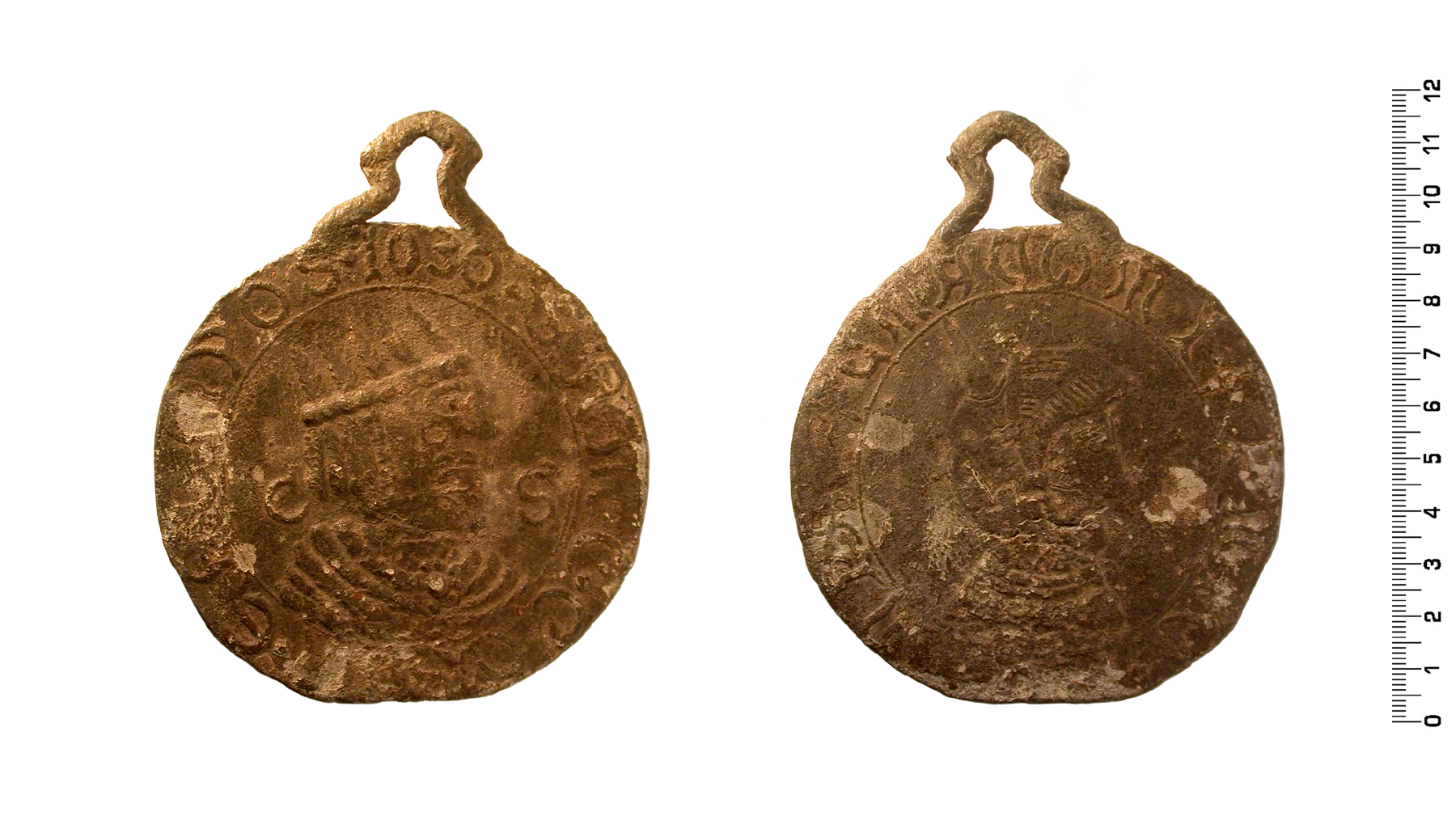
A lead Billy and Charley medallion, 93 to 113 millimetres (3.7 to 4.4 in) in diameter, 3.3 millimetres (0.13 in) thick and weighing 150 grams (5.3 oz). One side shows the profile head of a man wearing a crown; the other shows the head of a helmeted knight. The medallion is dated "1030". United Kingdom Portable Antiquities Scheme

In 1857 Smith and Eaton began to manufacture counterfeit artefacts. During their career, they are estimated to have made between 5,000 and 10,000 items. These displayed a variety of designs, including pilgrim badges, ampullae, statuettes, portable shrines, coins, medallions and ornamental spearheads. Initially these were made from lead or pewter, but copper-lead alloys were later applied. The items were cast using plaster of Paris moulds, into which a design was engraved by hand. They were then given the appearance of age by being bathed in acid and coated with river mud.

The commonest productions were medallions, around 2 to 4 inches (5 to 10 cm) in diameter. These had crude depictions of knights in armour, crowned kings or religious figures. They often carried inscriptions, but as Smith and Eaton were illiterate, these were meaningless jumbles of letters and symbols. To give the appearance of age, many of the items also carried dates between the 11th century and the 16th century. However the dates were inscribed using Arabic numerals which only came into use in England during the 15th century and so are anachronistic.

Between 1857 and 1858 Smith and Eaton sold about 1,100 of their forgeries to Edwards for a total of about £200. He, in turn, described them as "the most interesting relics I have met with for years". Smith and Eaton claimed the source of the steady stream of antiquities was the large-scale excavations then taking place as part of the construction of London's Shadwell Dock. Edwards showed samples to another antique dealer, George Eastwood, who bought many from Edwards before buying further supplies directly from Smith and Eaton, making these products his principal stock in trade. Eastwood advertised the items as a "A remarkable curious and unique collection of leaden signs or badges of the time of Richard II", He sold them to several customers, who were willing to pay highly for them; some were bought by individuals on behalf of the British Museum, although the keepers there were suspicious about their authenticity.

== Libel trial ==
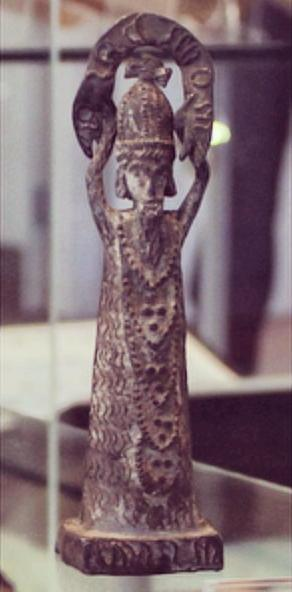
A Billy and Charley in the form of a lead statuette, 15.4 centimetres (6.1 in) high; probably intended to represent a bishop. Manchester Museum, accession number 1981.1150.

By 1858 Henry Syer Cuming, the secretary of the British Archaeological Association and Thomas Bateman, a wealthy landowner in the Derbyshire Peak District, who was also a keen antiquarian, archaeologist and collector, had become aware of the trade in these artefacts. They immediately suspected them to be forgeries, emanating from a single source, and corresponded with a view to exposing the objects as such.

Others were ready to accept the objects as genuine. Charles Roach Smith was perhaps their leading defender. A co-founder of the British Archaeological Association, a prominent collector, and a prolific author on archaeological subjects, he was possibly the most eminent antiquary of the time. He stated their very crudity was an argument for their authenticity – he assumed any 19th-century forger intent on deception would simply have done a better job in making them.

On 28 April 1858 Cuming delivered a lecture, Some Recent Forgeries in Lead, to the British Archaeological Association, when he condemned them as a "gross attempt at deception". This was reported in The Gentleman's Magazine and Athenaeum. George Eastwood responded firstly with letters defending the authenticity of the items he was selling, then, feeling this brought him little satisfaction, he sued the publishers of Athenaeum for libel. He agreed that he had not been named in the magazine's report, but as he was the largest vendor of the items described, the Athenaeum had implicitly libelled him, thus greatly damaging his business and his reputation.

The trial was held at Guildford Assizes on 4 August 1858. The judge was Sir James Shaw Willes, Eastwood was represented by Edwin James QC. The Athenaeum was represented by Montague Chambers QC.

William Smith (described in The Times newspaper report as a "rough looking young man") appeared in court. He claimed that he and Eaton obtained them from the Shadwell Dock construction site by bribing the navvies working there with money and drink, and by sneaking onto the site himself after hours. He and Eaton had sold around 2,000 items, making around £400. Examples of the artefacts were presented to the courts as exhibits. According to The Times "a good deal of amusement was produced by the extraordinary nature of some of those that were produced".

Charles Roach Smith testified to the objects' authenticity. He stated his belief that they were a previously unknown class of object with an unknown purpose. However, he was confident of their age. The Rev. Thomas Hugo, vicar of St Botolph-without-Bishopsgate, a fellow of the Society of Antiquaries and a prolific author on the antiquarian matters, said that he believed the items date to the 15th or 16th centuries, although he was unable to state exactly why he thought so. The artist and antiquary Frederick William Fairholt and two other antique dealers also testified that they believed them to be authentic.

At the end of the day the defence stated that, while the prosecution had tried to establish that the objects were authentic medieval objects, no evidence had been produced that George Eastwood had been libelled. The judge thus directed the jury to find the magazine publishers not-guilty of libel, but it was asked to affirm its faith in Eastwood's integrity.

== Subsequent history ==
The libel trial attracted widespread publicity, since it was covered in depth by The Times, with a report that was re-published in numerous national and local newspapers. Thus, even though Eastwood failed to convict The Athenaeum of libel, the result gave the appearance of endorsing the authenticity of his stock, and his sales increased exponentially, bringing him some prosperity.

Production and sale of the forgeries continued for three further years, until 1861, when Roach Smith published volume five of Collectanea Antiqua, an encyclopedic work about his personal archaeological researches. This included an article stating the items were crude, religious tokens, dating from the reign of Mary I of England, that had been imported from continental Europe as replacements for the devotional items destroyed during the English Reformation. Ironically, it transpired that illustrations from earlier volumes of Collectanea Antiqua had been used by Smith and Eaton when creating their fakes.

Meanwhile, Charles Reed, a philanthropically minded businessman and politician, who was also an amateur antiquarian, and antiquarian had been making an investigation into the artefacts, possibly prompted by Roach-Smith's Collectanea Antiqua. Making inquiries in the Shadwell Dock construction site, he was unable to find anybody who had seen the items in the course of their work, or who had done any trade with Smith or Eaton. He then gained the confidence of a tosher (one who scavenges in sewers), who had operated with Smith and Eaton, who informed him how the objects were being made. Reed was introduced to Smith and Eaton; having gained their trust, he paid the tosher to break into their workshop and steal several of their moulds; these were exhibited at a meeting of the Society of Antiquaries of London in March 1861, conclusively proving that the items were fakes.

== Later career of Smith and Eaton ==
Billy and Charlies on display at the London Museum Docklands, 2025

Despite their exposure, Smith and Eaton continued to make and sell forgeries. In October 1862 two individuals by the names of James Smith and William Aiken, who were quite obviously Smith and Eaton operating under assumed names, appeared in Bow Street Magistrates Court. In the Lyceum Tavern in the Strand they had appeared dressed as labourers, selling metal objects with a medieval appearance, claiming to have found them on demolition sites. The purchasers found the objects were not medieval, but "forgeries, a manufactory of which, it was said, exists at Whitechapel." When the purchasers took them to court, James Smith and William Aiken said that their accusers were not truly angry that the objects were of modern manufacture, but were, in reality, more unhappy because they had been unable to re-sell them for a considerable profit. The magistrate said that the objects under discussion showed some skill in manufacture, and dismissed the case.

As increasing awareness of their activities in the London area made it harder for them to sell their forgeries in the capital, they began travelling to towns and cities in South East England selling their products. In 1867 they stopped at several towns on the Great Western Railway out of London, reaching Windsor. Here they sold many articles in local pubs and shops. Eventually a local clergyman recognised the items they were selling, and alerted the police. Smith and Eaton were arrested and taken to court, but it was decided that there was insufficient evidence to prosecute and they were released.

In 1868 they seem to have made flying visits to towns, selling their forgeries, then quickly moving on before they could be discovered. Early that year they sold forgeries in Guildford, Southampton and Portsmouth. While at Portsmouth they visited the nearby town of Portsea, where they sold items which were mis-identified as Roman archaeological finds and displayed as such in a local history exhibition until a local clergyman recognised the anachronisms in the products' design. Later that year their productions were sold in Bedford, Cambridge and Bury St. Edmunds, Suffolk.

Charley Eaton died of consumption on 4 January 1870 in Matilda Place, a yard adjacent to North-East Passage, between Cable Street and Wellclose Square in the Tower Hamlets area of London. (The site has been wholly cleared away by modern re-development, and nothing now survives of this location.) His death certificate described him as a 'riverside labourer'. After this there are infrequent mentions of Billy Smith continuing to try to sell forgeries. In 1870 he gave Henry Cuming a badge he had made, with the chalk mould, the only mould of one of these forgeries known to have survived; in 1871 he failed to sell a lead copy of a 13th-century jug; in 1872 he sold two lead tokens. After this nothing more is known of him.

== Collections ==
Examples of Billys and Charleys are in the collections of the British Museum, the Victoria and Albert Museum and the Museum of London. Many were held by the Cuming Museum, which contained Henry Cuming's personal collections. The Cuming Museum has now closed, but many of its collections are now displayed at the Southwark Local Studies Centre.
