= Esther Milnes Day =

British author and philanthropist

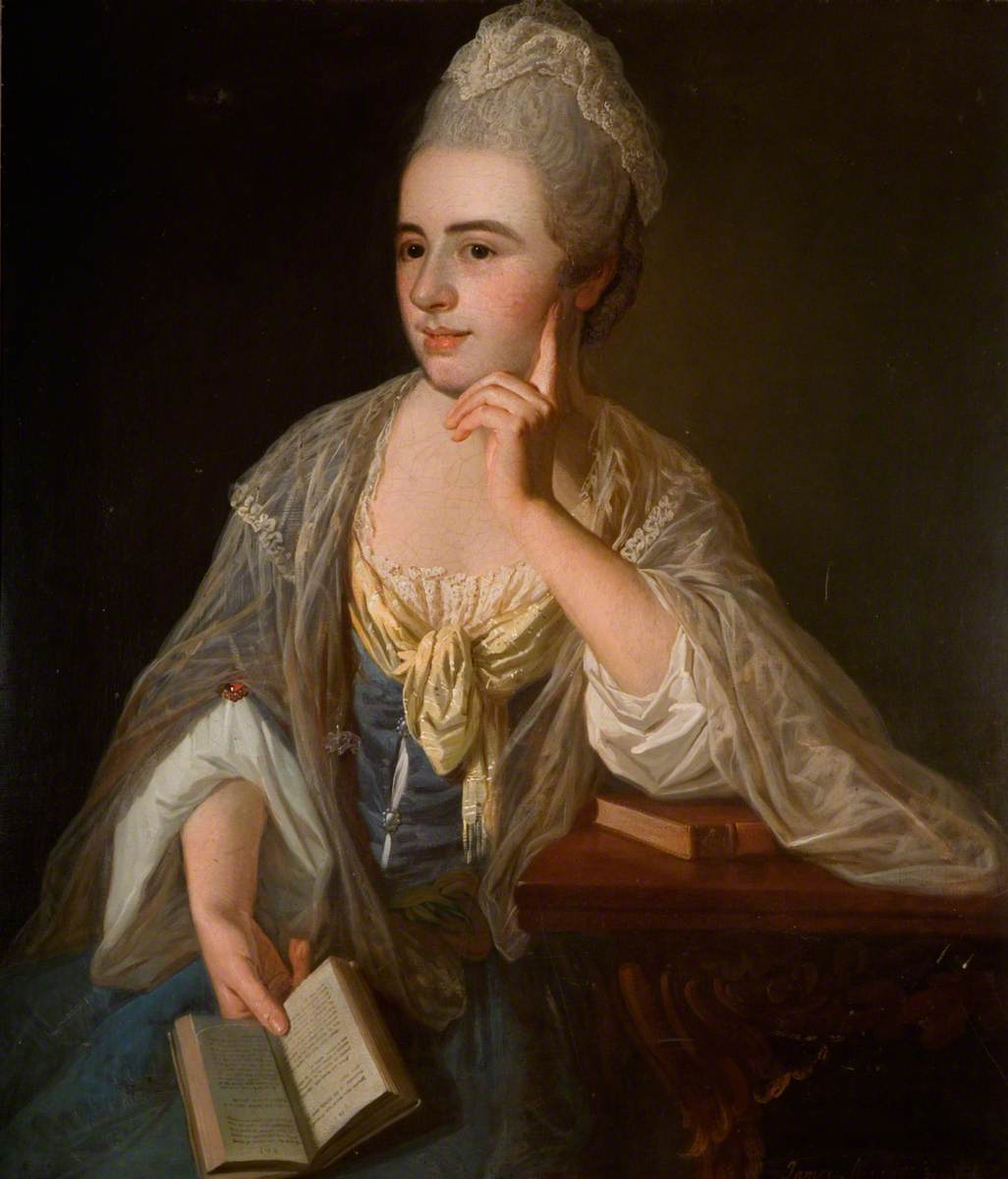
- Portrait of Mrs. Esther Day by James Millar (1735–1805)
- Born: Esther Milnes; 1752; Wakefield, England
- Died: 1792 (aged 39–40)
- Resting place: St Mary's Church, Wargrave, Berkshire
- Occupations: author, philanthropist
- Spouse: Thomas Day
- Relatives: Thomas Lowndes (nephew)
- Writing career
- Notable work: Select miscellaneous productions (1805)

Esther Day (née Milnes; 1752–1792) was a British author and philanthropist.

== Life ==
Esther Milnes was born to Richard Milnes (1705-1757), of Palterton, sometime of Chesterfield, and Elizabeth (d. 1757), daughter of Thomas Hawksworth, of London. Her father and maternal grandfather were ranked as gentlemen. She was the heiress to her family's estate, with her three brothers having died young; her only surviving sister, Elizabeth, who married Robert Lowndes, survived their parents by only twelve years. The Milnes family- of which her father was a second son- had for generations been successful merchants and property owners in Derbyshire and Yorkshire.

She was educated at "Mrs. Dennis's Female Boarding School in Queen's Square."

Milnes married Thomas Day (1748–1789) at Bath on 7 August 1778. Thomas Day was an abolitionist, socialist, republican, campaigner for clean air and land reclamation, and hugely popular writer of children's fiction. He continued a proponent of Rousseauism and insisted that he and his wife live a simple and secluded life. Esther was required to give up many of her social connections, luxuries, and previous leisure-time occupations, such as the harpsichord. Unusually, however, her husband insisted that she retain control over her own finances in case she ever tired of their ascetic style of life.

In 1779 the couple moved to a small estate at Stapleford Abbotts, near Abridge in Essex. In 1780, Thomas Day bought an estate at Anningsley in Surrey and the couple moved there in 1783. It was a philanthropic project whereby the Days sought to improve the lives of their workers.

Esther Day had no children, and Thomas Lowndes (born c. 1766), her deceased sister Elizabeth's son, was treated by the couple as their heir. Thomas Day died in a riding accident on 28 September 1789 and Esther Day, debilitated by her loss, died less than three years later.

After their deaths, Lowndes edited and published Select miscellaneous productions, of Mrs. Day, and Thomas Day in 1805; the collection consists of some unpublished works of Thomas Day, Esther Day's juvenilia, and some of his own poems to "increase the size of the work." The collection is dedicated to "the fair females of the British Isles," whom the editor reassures that with appropriate education, they would no doubt surpass men. In the "apology" which precedes Esther Day's work, Lowndes's comments informs us that the poems were written when she was between eleven and fifteen. He professes himself astonished that someone so talented should have ceased writing, and speculates that she may have been overly diffident. A twentieth-century commentator called it "earnest, remarkable work" for someone so young.

== Works ==
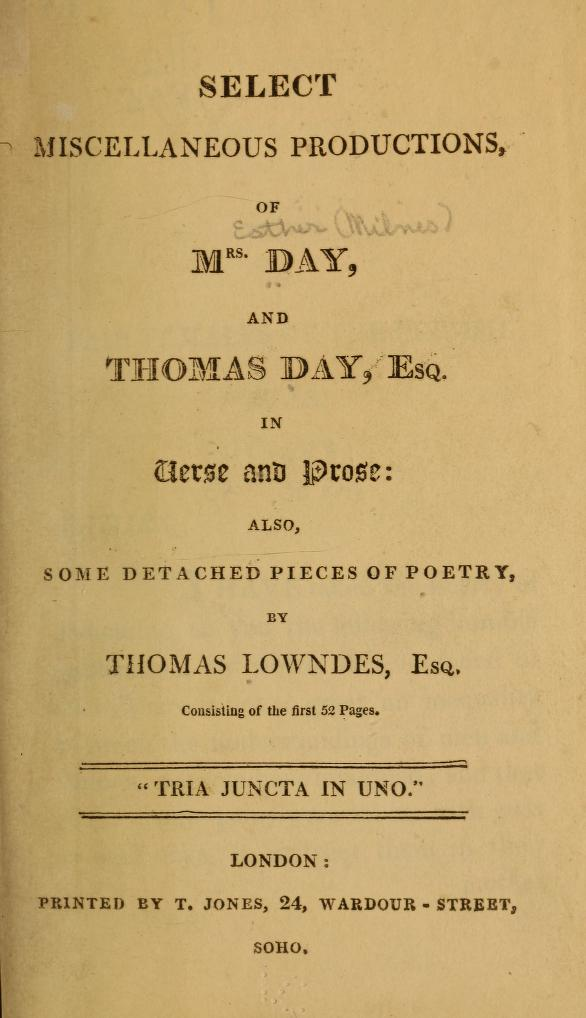
Title page of Esther Milnes Day, Thomas Day, and Thomas Lowndes. Select miscellaneous productions, of Mrs. Day, and Thomas Day, esq., in verse and prose. London: Cadell and Davies, 1805.

- Day, Esther Milnes, Thomas Day, and Thomas Lowndes. Select miscellaneous productions, of Mrs. Day, and Thomas Day, esq., in verse and prose: also, some detached pieces of poetry. London: Cadell and Davies, 1805 (Internet Archive)

== Etexts ==
- Day, Esther Milnes, 1753-1792; Day, Thomas, 1748-1789; Lowndes, Thomas, b. 1766?. Select miscellaneous productions, of Mrs. Day, and Thomas Day, esq., in verse and prose: also, some detached pieces of poetry. London: Cadell and Davies, 1805 (Digitization, Internet Archive)

== See also ==
- Thomas Day (writer)
- Sabrina Sidney
