= James Millar (artist) =

English painter

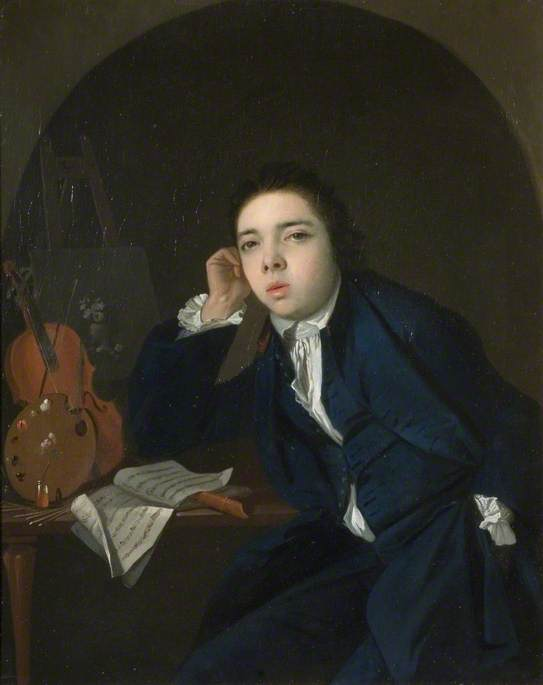
Image of James Millar

James Millar (c. 1735 – 5 December 1805) was an English portrait painter.

Born in Birmingham, Millar is recorded in the town's Poor Law levy books in 1763 but was to become the leading Birmingham portrait painter of the last quarter of the 18th century. Subjects of his portraits include John Baskerville, Francis Eginton, John Freeth and the wife of Lunar Society of Birmingham member Thomas Day.

The Midlands Enlightenment strongly influenced Millar's approach – one of his works depicts allegories of wisdom, and symbols of science and the arts in the shadow of the tower of Birmingham's St. Philip's Church.

Millar exhibited at the Royal Academy and the Society of Artists in London between 1771 and 1790, and examples of his work are held by the Fitzwilliam Museum in Cambridge, Wolverhampton Art Gallery, Lichfield Guildhall, the Royal Society, the Cowper and Newton Museum, and the National Portrait Gallery, London.
