= Sabrina Sidney =

British foundling (1757–1843)

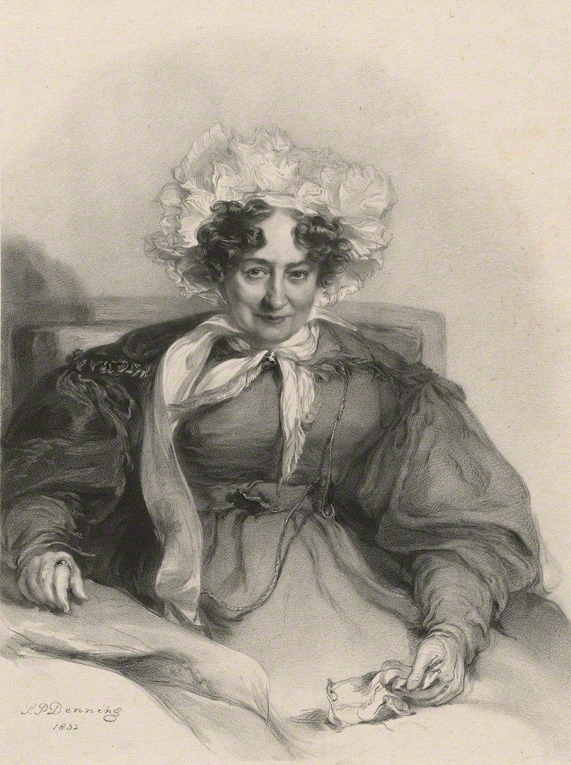
- Sabrina, aged 75
- Born: Manima Butler (baptised); Ann Kingston (orphanage renamed); 1757; Clerkenwell, London, England
- Died: 8 September 1843 (aged 85–86); Greenwich, London, England
- Resting place: Kensal Green Cemetery
- Other names: Sabrina Bicknell
- Known for: Subject of a 'perfect wife' experiment by Thomas Day
- Spouse: John Bicknell (m. 1784; died 1787)
- Children: 2, including John Laurens Bicknell

Sabrina Bicknell (1757 – 8 September 1843), better known as Sabrina Sidney, was a British woman abandoned at the Foundling Hospital in London as a baby, and taken in at the age of 12 by author Thomas Day, who tried to mould her into his perfect wife. She grew up to marry one of Day's friends, instead, and eventually became a school manager.

Inspired by Jean-Jacques Rousseau's book Emile, or On Education, Day decided to educate two girls using his own concepts, after struggling to find a wife who shared his ideology. In 1769, Day and his barrister friend, John Bicknell, chose Sidney and another girl, Lucretia, from orphanages, and falsely declared they would be indentured to Day's friend Richard Lovell Edgeworth. Day took the girls to France to begin Rousseau's methods of education in isolation. After a short time, he returned to Lichfield with only Sidney, having deemed Lucretia inappropriate for his experiment. He used unusual and sometimes cruel techniques to try to increase her fortitude, such as firing blanks at her skirts, dripping hot wax on her arms, and having her wade into a lake fully dressed to test her resilience to cold water.

When Sidney reached her teenage years, Day was persuaded by Edgeworth that his ideal wife experiment had failed and he should send her away, as it was inappropriate for Day to live with her unchaperoned. He then arranged for Sidney to undergo experimental vocational and residential changes—first attending a boarding school, then becoming an apprentice to a dressmaker family, and eventually being employed as Day's housekeeper. Having seen changes in Sidney, Day proposed marriage, though he soon called this off when she did not follow his strict instructions; he again sent her away, this time to a boarding house, where she later found work as a lady's companion.

In 1783, Bicknell sought out Sidney and proposed marriage, telling her the truth about Day's experiment. Horrified, she confronted Day in a series of letters; he admitted the truth but refused to apologise. Sidney married Bicknell, and the couple had two children before his death in 1787. Sidney went on to work with schoolmaster Charles Burney, managing his schools. In 1804, Anna Seward published a book about Sidney's upbringing. Edgeworth followed up with his memoirs, in which he claimed Sidney loved Day. Sidney herself, on the other hand, said she was miserable with Day and that he treated her as a slave.

== Early life ==
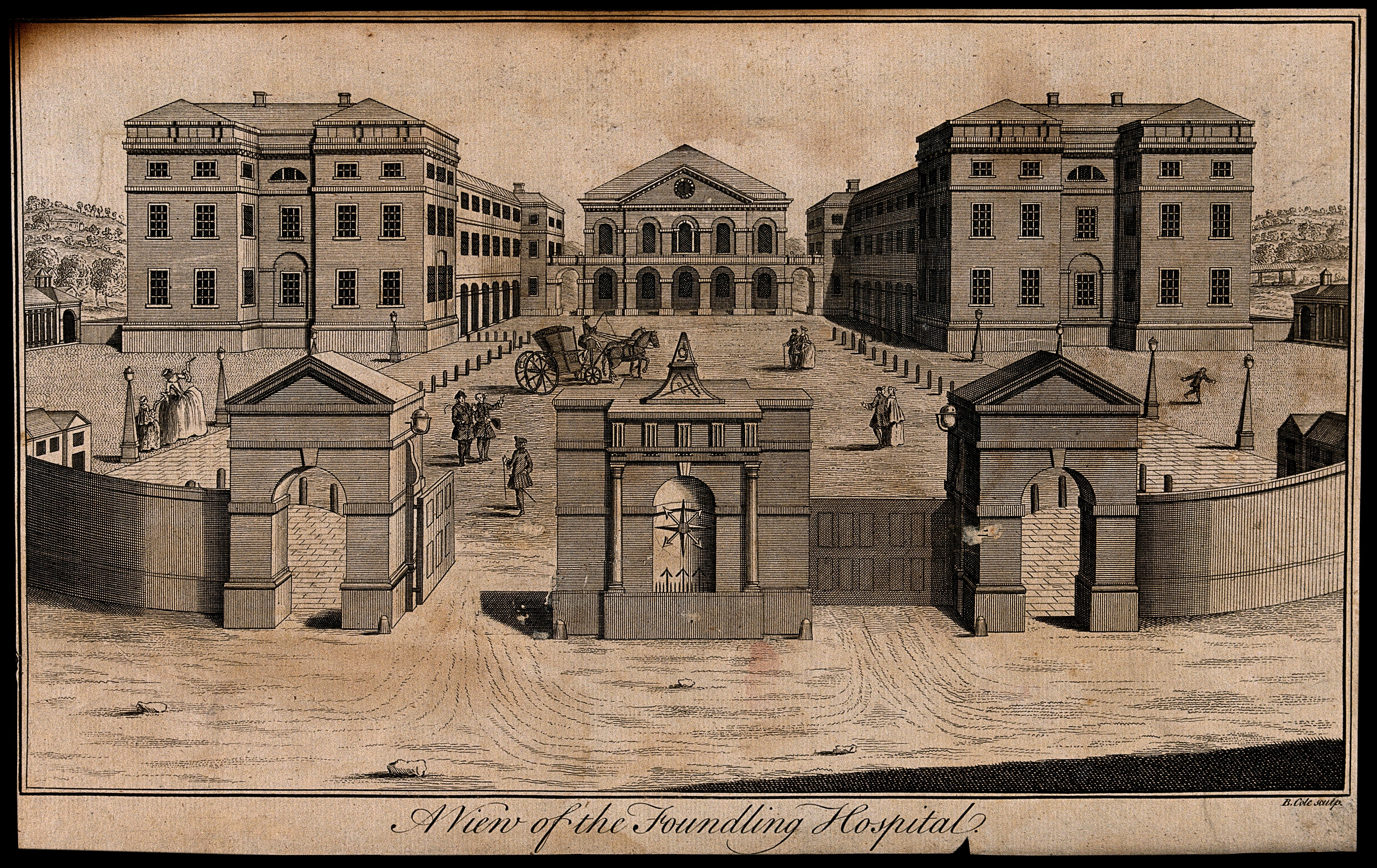
The now-demolished Foundling Hospital, where Sidney was abandoned

Sidney was born in 1757 in Clerkenwell, London, and was left at the Hospital for the Maintenance and Education of Exposed and Deserted Young Children (more commonly known as the Foundling Hospital) in London on 24 May 1757 by an anonymous individual. This person left a note explaining that the baby's baptismal name was Manima Butler and that she had been baptised in St James's Church, Clerkenwell. Her name was likely a misspelling of Monimia, but there were no baptismal records for any spelling of the name at the parish.

One of the requirements of the Foundling Hospital was that babies were to be less than six months old at the time of admittance, but the hospital did not keep more accurate records of age. Another requirement was that foundlings be given a new name and a reference number, so Sidney became Girl Ann Kingston no. 4759. She was taken in by a wet nurse, Mary Penfold, who brought her to Wotton, Surrey, where she remained until 1759, when she was two years old. Although it was usual for foundlings to remain with their wet nurse until the age of five or six, the Foundling Hospital had received an influx of new babies and moved many children who no longer required nursing, including Sidney, to the Shrewsbury branch of the Foundling Hospital. The Shrewsbury building was not completed until 1765, so in the meantime Sidney and another foundling were cared for by a nurse, Ann Casewell, at her home.

== Day's experiment ==
=== Background ===
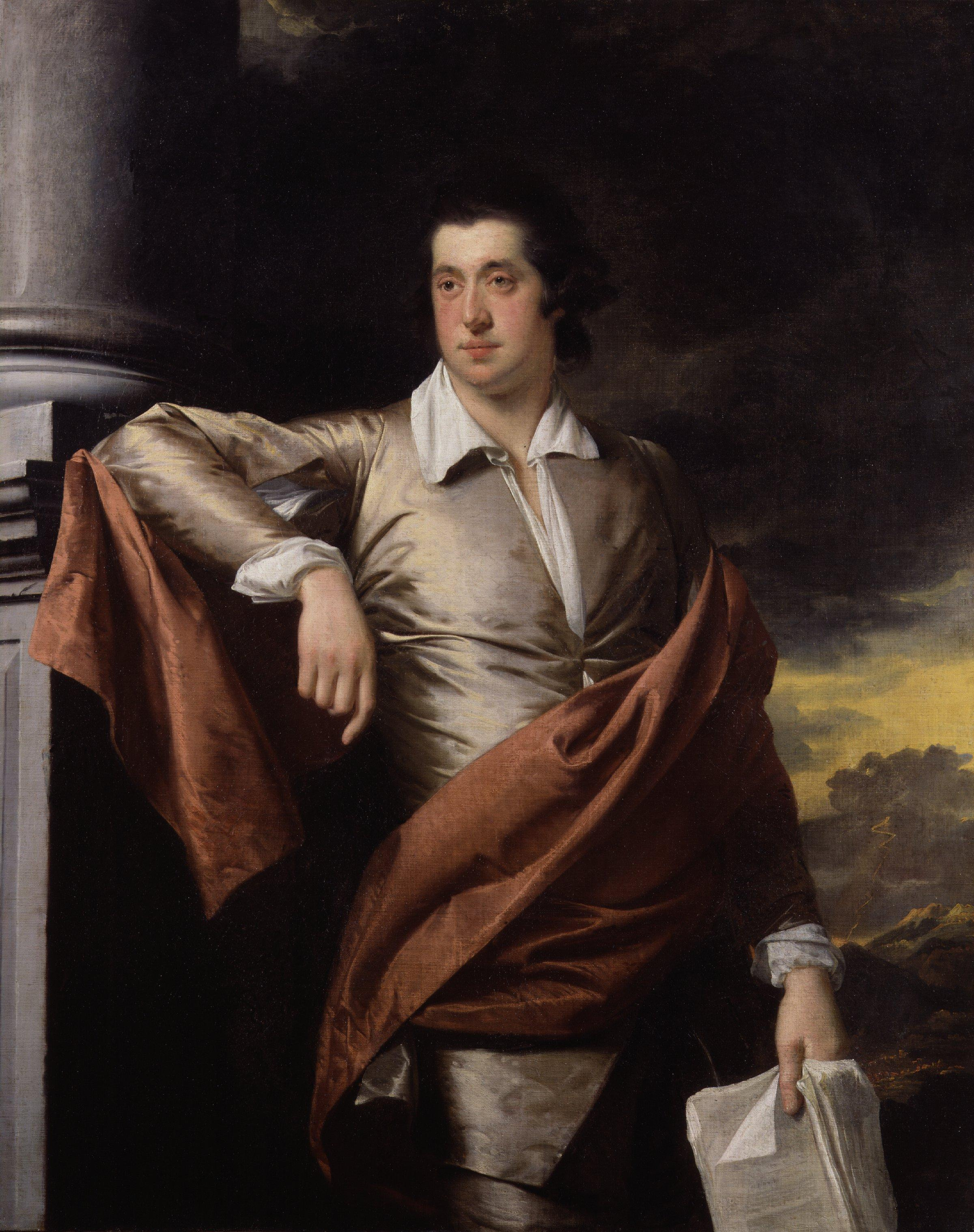
Thomas Day in 1770

Thomas Day was a bachelor who had inherited his fortune from his father when he was an infant. Described as having a face pockmarked from smallpox, a brooding personality, and a short temper, Day attended Corpus Christi College, Oxford, to study philosophy. It was there that he decided to dedicate his life to becoming a virtuous man, shunning luxury and focusing on altruism. Around the same time he developed a list of requirements for his future wife, that she should be subservient and pure but also able to discuss philosophy and live without frivolities. These high standards, combined with his generally unlikeable personality, meant that his advances were rejected by several women while he was at university.

Day was introduced to the work of Jean-Jacques Rousseau by his friend Richard Lovell Edgeworth; the pair shared a particular affinity for Rousseau's work on education in the book Emile, or On Education. On leaving Oxford, Edgeworth and Day attempted to teach Edgeworth's first son, Dick, in the style of Emile, a learning-by-doing approach. Accompanying Edgeworth to Ireland as Dick's tutor, Day fell in love and was spurned first by Edgeworth's sister, and then by at least three other women in quick succession.

Day came to the conclusion that he would not be able to find a wife who would meet his high standards and largely blamed women's education for this. Inspired by the character of Sophie in Rousseau's Emile, he resolved to "create" his ideal wife by raising her from adolescence, using the techniques laid out in the book. Day was approaching financial independence, when he would have full access to the money left to him, and conspired with his barrister friend, John Bicknell, to find two girls who could be taken into his care to be groomed as a perfect wife.

=== Choosing the girls ===
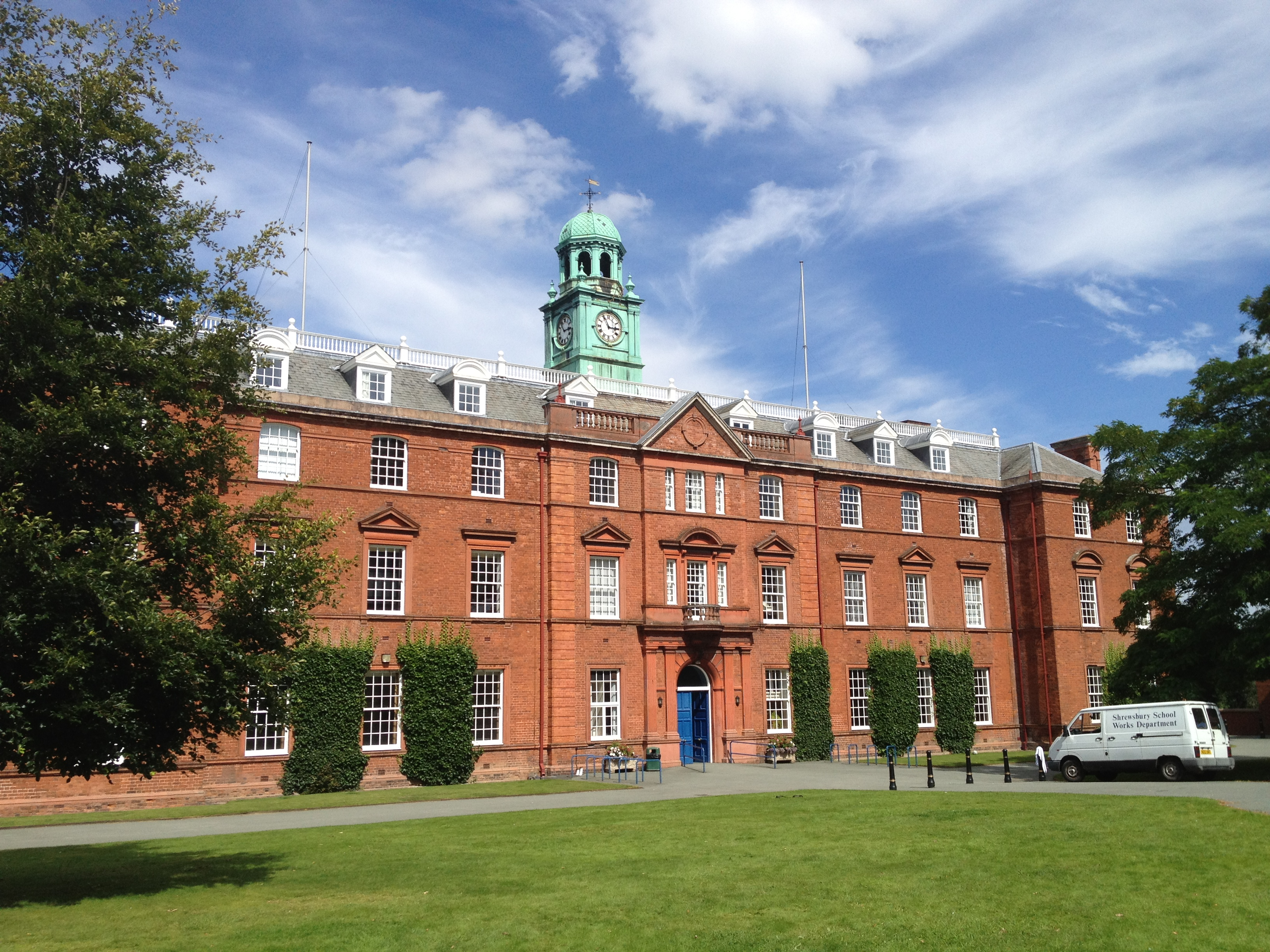
Shrewsbury Orphan Hospital, which now forms part of Shrewsbury School

Just after Day's 21st birthday in June 1769, he and John Bicknell travelled to the Shrewsbury Orphan Hospital to choose the first girl for his experiment. Sidney was 12 years old at the time, described as "a clear auburn brunette, with darker eyes more glowing bloom and chestnut tresses". She was slender, and had long eyelashes and a pleasant voice. Day was struggling to choose a girl for the experiment, and Bicknell quickly picked her out. The pair did not tell the orphanage secretary, Samuel Magee, about the planned experiment. Instead they told him that she was to be indentured as a servant at Edgeworth's country house in Berkshire, waiving the £4 (equivalent to £701 in 2023) fee they would have received for the apprenticeship. In line with the orphanage's requirements that responsibility be held by a married man, Edgeworth would be legally accountable for Sidney, despite him not being present nor even aware of the arrangement.

The apprenticeship was approved by the governors of the orphanage on 30 June 1769; Day and Bicknell collected Sidney on 17 August. She was brought to lodgings in London, where she met Edgeworth for the first time. Day changed her name to Sabrina Sidney: Sabrina, the Latin name for the River Severn, which her orphanage overlooked; and Sidney after Algernon Sidney, one of Day's heroes. Day became a benefactor, and subsequently governor, of the Foundling Hospital, and on 20 September 1769 he chose another girl for his experiment, renaming her Lucretia after the Roman matron.

Day had Bicknell draw up a contract to define the terms of the girls' indenture. Within one year, he would choose which girl he intended to marry, and the other would be given as an apprentice to a woman in a trade, along with a fee of £100 (equivalent to £17,527 in 2023). He would give a further £400 (equivalent to £70,108 in 2023) upon the girl's marriage or if she were to start her own business. He would marry his intended bride or, if he decided not to, would gift her the sum of £500 (equivalent to £87,635 in 2023). Bicknell acted as guarantor for the contract.

=== Education in France ===
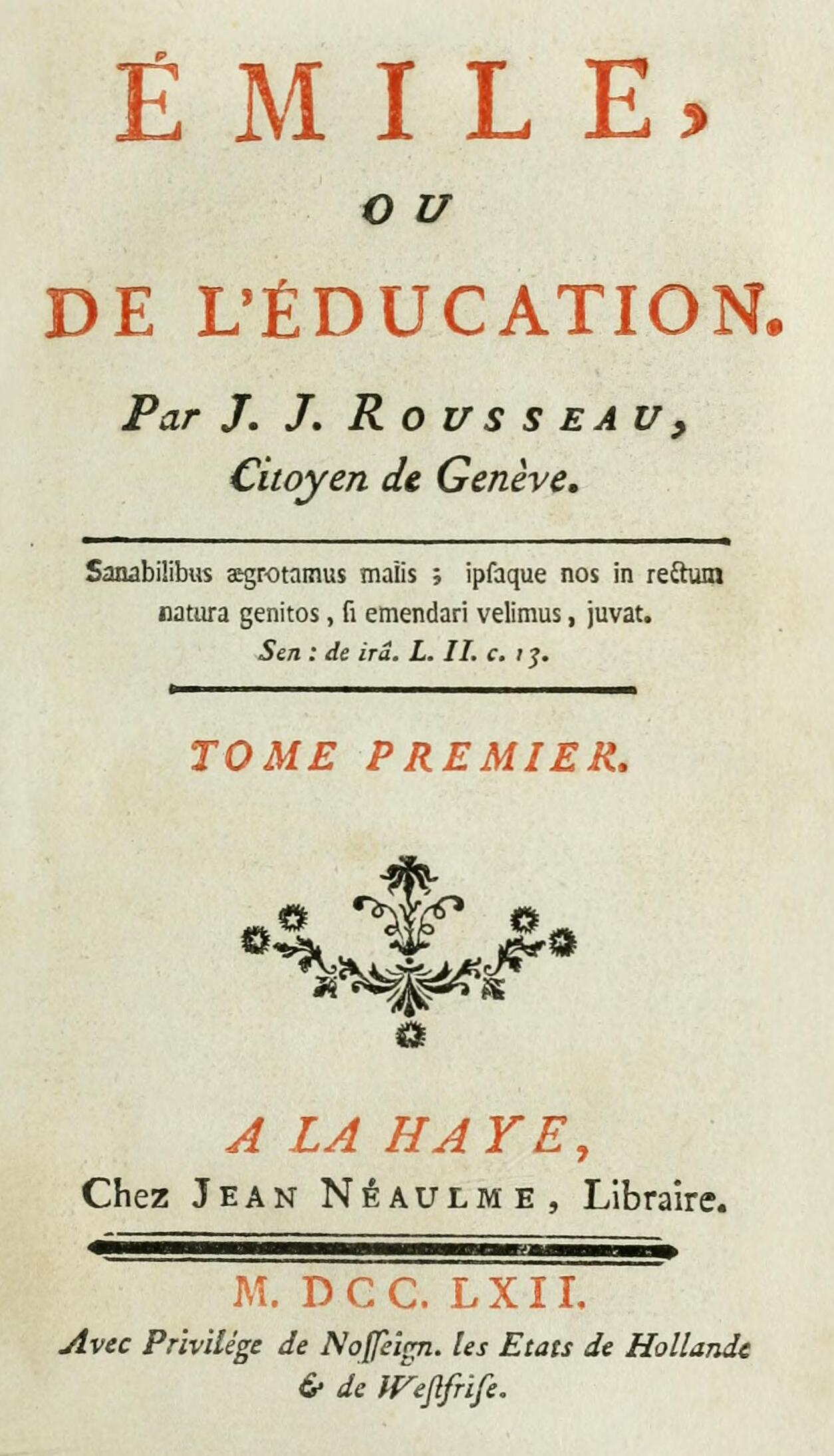
Day's education of Sabrina followed suggestions from Emile, or On Education.

Day wished for the girls to be isolated from external influences while he educated them so, at the beginning of November 1769, he decided to move them to France. It is also possible that he did this to protect himself from the legal ramifications of his experiment, as well as societal gossip. The trio travelled over 600 miles to Avignon, renting a house in le quartier des fusteries. The girls could speak no French and Day employed no English-speaking servants, to be sure that he would be the only person to influence them.

Day focussed on the girls' education, in the style of Emile. He expanded on the teaching they had received from the Foundling Hospital in reading and basic arithmetic, and also taught them how to write. He believed that the girls should be able to manage the house, so they were charged with cooking and cleaning as well as other housework. Finally, he wanted to be able to debate complex concepts with them, so he taught them rudimentary theories in physics and geography, tasking them with observing the changing of the seasons, and recording details of sunrises and sunsets. He also imparted to them Rousseau's philosophical contempt for luxury.

During his stay in France, Day regularly corresponded with Edgeworth. He said that both girls were passionate about their studies, Sidney more so. Day also related anecdotes, one concerning a trip on the Rhone where the boat overturned and he rescued both girls single-handedly as neither could swim. He described an incident in which he challenged a French Army officer to a duel, even producing a set of dueling pistols, simply as a manner of engaging or encouraging conversation with his young students; the officer apologised and explained he did not mean any offence, calming the situation.

Accounts by 19th-century historians suggest that Day grew impatient with the girls when they became bored with their lessons and began to squabble, and that he also spent significant time nursing them through a bout of smallpox. These accounts may have been exaggerated as both girls had been inoculated against smallpox, and their time at the Foundling Hospital would have discouraged such behaviour.

=== Return to England ===
While in France, Day struggled over which girl to choose to take forward with the experiment. Both were beautiful; Lucretia was more cheerful, Sidney more reserved and studious. The trio returned to England in spring 1770, by which time Day had finally decided that he would carry on with Sidney's training. Edgeworth explained that each of Day's projects with Sabrina had been successful, but he had come to the conclusion that Lucretia was "invincibly stupid". Day apprenticed Lucretia to a milliner in Ludgate Hill, and took Sidney to Stowe House in Lichfield, where her training could continue. The household would have had no more than a couple of servants, leaving Sidney to maintain the four floors of the house. Her tutoring continued at the same time, with one-on-one lessons from Day on a variety of subjects.

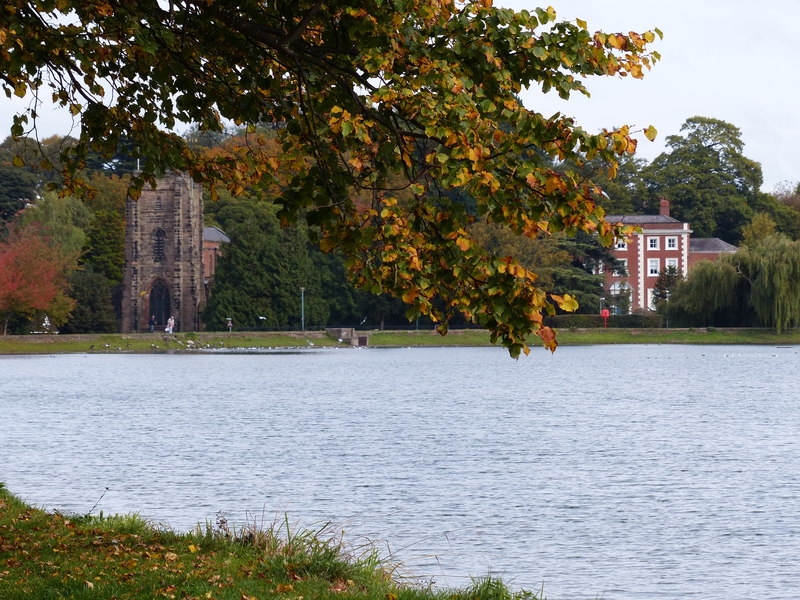
Stowe House, Day's Lichfield residence, viewed across Stowe Pool, the lake into which Sidney waded

Day extended his tutoring to fortify Sidney against hardship, again based upon his interpretation of Rousseau's Emile. The book explains the concept of "negative education", protecting a person from vices rather than teaching them virtues. Day interpreted this to mean that submitting Sidney to tests of endurance would help to create a woman with hardened nerves. One example given by Rousseau was helping Emile become accustomed to explosions such as fireworks by firing pistols with small amounts of powder near him, gradually increasing the amount of powder. Day, on the other hand, fired a pistol loaded with powder directly at Sidney's petticoat, not telling her that there was no shot in it.

In an attempt to increase her resistance to pain he would drop hot sealing wax on her back and arms or stick pins in her, commanding her not to cry out. He would test her ability to keep secrets by telling her that his life was in danger and she should tell no one. To increase her resistance to the cold, Day instructed Sidney to wade into Stowe Pool until the water reached her neck, then lie in the nearby meadow until her clothes and hair had dried in the sun. Finally, to test her resistance to luxury, he gave her a big box of handmade silk clothes and had her throw them on a fire. Day had limited success with these techniques. Sidney became able to endure hot wax dripped on her arm without flinching, but she did tell others of his secret techniques, and could not help screaming whenever he fired his gun at her.

During their time at Stowe House, Day introduced Sidney to members of the local intellectual circle, including the priest at Lichfield Cathedral, Thomas Seward. Seward and his wife hoped that Day might be a suitor for their daughter, Anna, and Anna's writings of the time show her interest in Day. Anna was also enchanted by Sidney, who became the link between Day and the Seward family. Anna took a keen interest in Sidney's story, as her father had taken in Honora Sneyd when Sneyd's mother had died.

== Moving away from Day ==
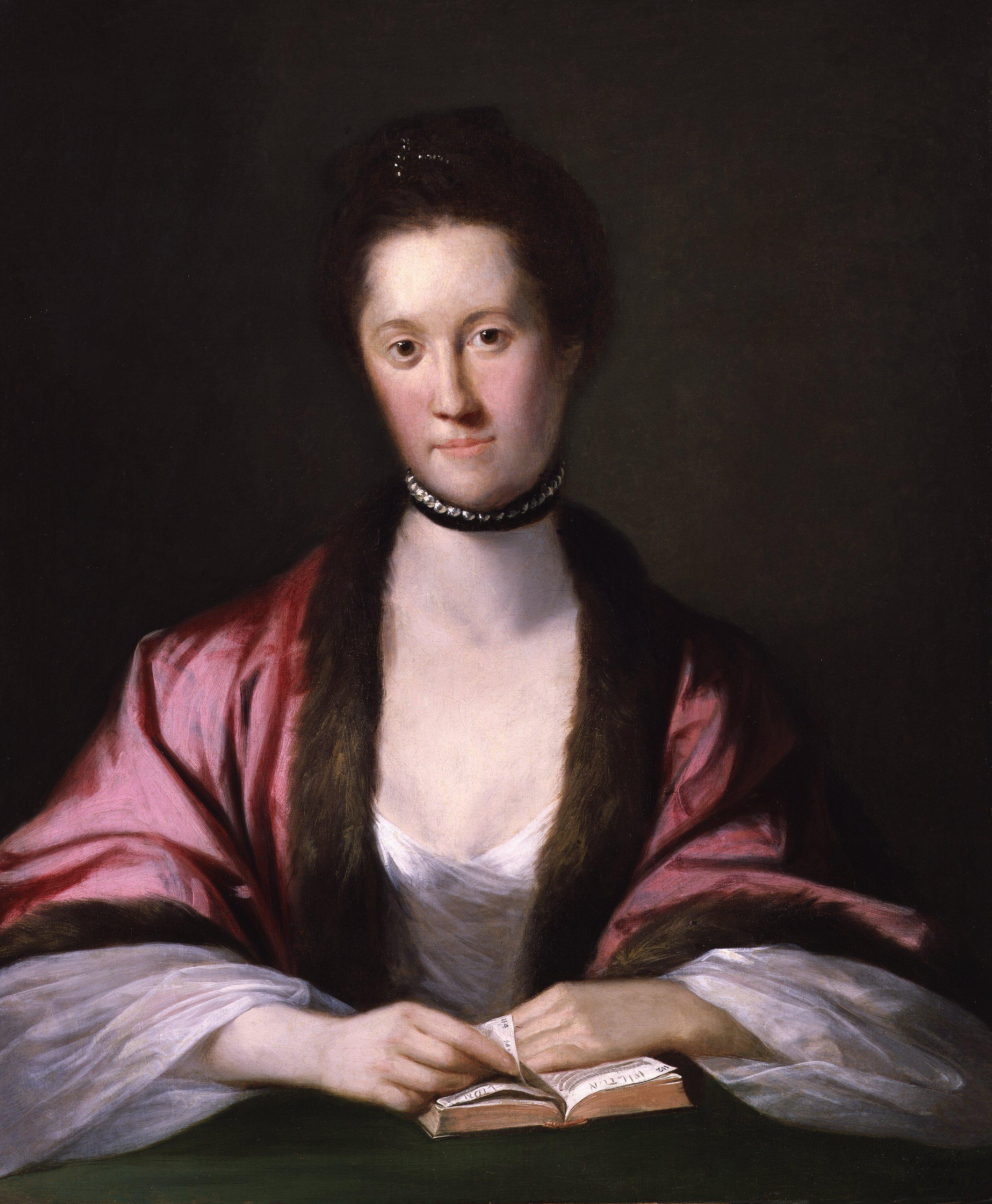
Anna Seward, acquaintance of Day who questioned the propriety of his relationship with Sidney

By 1770, Sidney began to question Day's techniques and to complain about the chores she had to perform. In December, the propriety of Day's arrangement with Sidney was questioned by the local community, especially Anna Seward. Edgeworth joined Day for Christmas at Stowe, and convinced him that his experiment had been unsuccessful. He also persuaded Day that Sidney was too old to live with him without a chaperone. Day appeared to accept Edgeworth's point of view, as he paid for Sidney to attend Sutton Coldfield boarding school in Warwickshire early in 1771. She remained at the boarding school for three years, including weekends and holidays, with infrequent visits from Day. The school normally focused on preparing high society daughters for marriage, with subjects such as needlework and the arts. Day stipulated that she was to be taught academic subjects but should not dance or learn music.

In 1774, Day visited Sidney to inform her that she would be apprenticed to the Parkinsons, a family of dressmakers, as Day believed the profession would not expose her to temptation. She was delivered to the family with the stipulation that she should work hard at chores and be denied luxuries. The Parkinsons, however, treated Sidney well, to the extent that Day later chastised them for not instilling "industry and frugality" in her. Less than a year later the Parkinsons' business went bankrupt, leaving Sidney without an apprenticeship and nowhere to live. Day arranged for her to stay with his friends, the Keir family, and implied that she could take on the role of housekeeper at his own home. Day again considered Sidney, who was now 18, a potential wife, but did not let her know of his intentions, nor that her upbringing was part of his experiment.

=== Broken engagement ===
Over the next few months, Day returned to moulding Sidney to meet his requirements for the ideal woman, choosing what she would wear, and pushing his ideas of frugality upon her. Sidney took on all the ideas willingly and Day believed he had finally created a woman who would meet all his requirements. He was so confident that he talked openly of marrying Sidney, though she was unaware of his intentions. Eventually one of Day's friends let her know that he hoped to marry her. Sidney confronted Day about the rumours and he admitted they were true, neglecting to mention that he had hoped to marry her since the day he met her.

Sidney did not refuse the proposal, so Day planned the wedding while she considered it further and eventually agreed. During the preparations, Day left Sidney with friends for a few days, giving her strict instructions on what she should wear. When he returned to find her in an outfit that did not meet his requirements, he flew into a rage and Sidney fled for a few hours, so Day called off the engagement. Sidney was sent to a boarding house in Birmingham and given a stipend of £50 per annum (equivalent to £7,947 in 2023). Day resolved never to see her again.

== Marriage ==
"I never thought I had a right to sacrifice another being to my own good or pleasure; but whatever else ensued you would be placed in circumstances infinitely more favourable to happiness than before"

— Day's explanation of his behaviour to Sidney

After her engagement to Day ended, Sidney spent eight years at boarding houses around Birmingham. Day met and went on to marry an heiress, Esther Milnes, in 1778. Sidney met an apothecary, Jarvis Wardley, who proposed marriage in an acrostic poem. She contacted Day for advice, and he told her in absolute terms not to marry Wardley, even writing an acrostic poem for her to use in turning him down. In 1783, she had become a lady's companion in Newport, Shropshire. It was there that she was approached by Day's friend, the man who helped choose her at the foundling hospital, John Bicknell. Bicknell was single and had spent the majority of his earnings from his law career in gambling dens. He had not paid much attention to Sidney since selecting her with Day, but proposed marriage immediately.

Sidney again consulted Day on the prospective engagement. Day did not approve, claiming the age difference was too great, although Bicknell was only two years older than Day. Bicknell decided to tell Sidney the truth about the experiment, that she was hand-picked to be Day's wife from childhood, and that all of Day's actions were designed to further his goal of turning her into the ideal bride. Horrified, Sidney wrote to Day to confront him over Bicknell's statements. Day admitted the truth but refused to apologise. After a series of letters, Day gave his consent to the marriage, telling her that the letter would be his final communication with her.

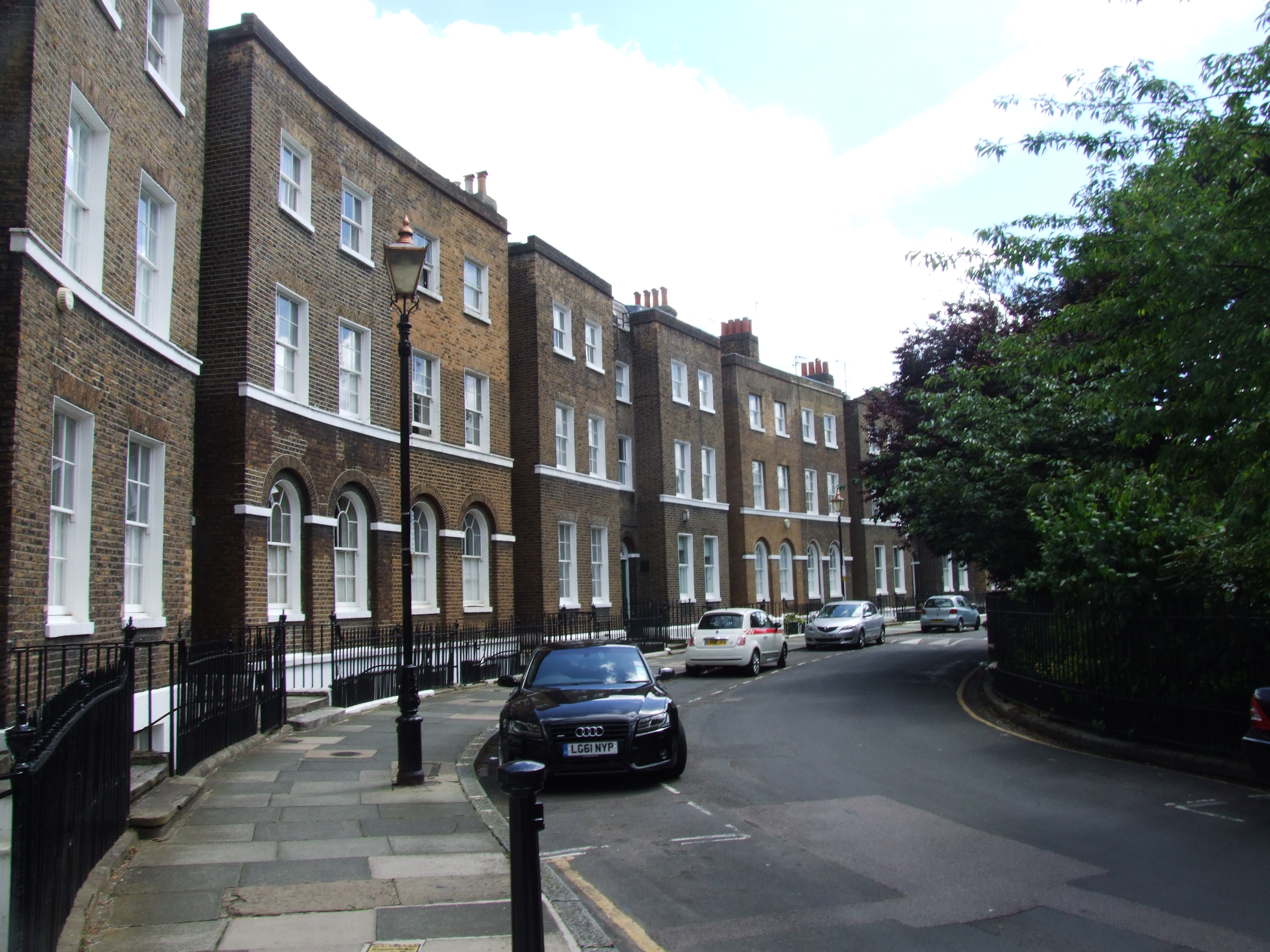
Final residence of Sabrina Bicknell, at 29 Gloucester Circus, Greenwich

Bicknell and Sidney married on 16 April 1784 at St Philip's Cathedral, Birmingham. The same day, Day paid the £500 wedding dowry he had stipulated in the contract he had set up with Bicknell, ending his £50 (equivalent to £7,727 in 2023) per year stipend. The couple bought a house in Shenfield and had two children, John Laurens Bicknell and Henry Edgeworth Bicknell. Bicknell carried on with his gambling habits, squandering the remaining money over the following three years. On 27 March 1787, after three years of marriage, John Bicknell died of a paralytic stroke.

Sidney and her two children were now left without an income. Day sent her a new stipend of £30 per year, (equivalent to £4,768 in 2023) which was matched by Edgeworth. Her husband's barrister friends raised £800 (equivalent to £127,144 in 2023) for the widow and her children. Sidney found a role as housekeeper for Charles Burney, as well as general manager of his schools in Chiswick, Hammersmith, and Greenwich. It was at his Greenwich school that her own children were educated.

Day's widow, Esther Milnes Day, continued paying Sidney's allowance after his death in 1789, and Sidney carried on her work with Burney until she was 68. By this time she was living in a four-storey house in Gloucester Circus, Greenwich, with her own servants. On 8 September 1843, Sidney died at her home of a severe asthma attack. She was buried at Kensal Green Cemetery.

== Legacy ==
Sidney asked her friends not to discuss her past as she believed her humble beginnings, and Day's mistreatment of her, would tarnish her reputation. Anna Seward nevertheless wrote about Sidney's upbringing in her 1804 work Memoirs on the Life of Dr. Darwin. As Seward publicly identified Sidney in the book, it was criticised by the press, and Sidney's son John was very angry to learn of his mother's past. In his 1820 memoirs, Edgeworth stated his belief that Sidney and Day made a good match and that she loved him. Sidney disagreed with these accounts, saying that Day had made her miserable, and that she had effectively been a slave.

Sidney's education has been compared to George Bernard Shaw's Pygmalion, which may have been inspired by her story. Strong parallels have also been drawn between Sidney's upbringing and two novels of 1871: Henry James's Watch and Ward, and Anthony Trollope's Orley Farm. The story of her life has been told in Wendy Moore's 2013 book How to Create the Perfect Wife and dramatised in the 2015 BBC Radio 4 play The Imperfect Education of Sabrina Sidney.

== Bibliography ==
- Backscheider, Paula R. (2002). "My art belongs to daddy?". Revising Women: Eighteenth-Century "Women's Fiction" and Social Engagement (Illustrated, Revised ed.). Baltimore, MD: Taylor & Francis. ISBN 978-0-8018-7095-8.
- Blackman, John (1862). A Memoir of the Life and Writings of Thomas Day. London: Joh Bedford Leno.
- Cunningham, Hugh (2012). "The Eighteenth Century". The Invention of Childhood. London: Random House. ISBN 978-1-4464-1615-0.
- Douthwaite, Julia V. (2002). The wild girl, natural man, and the monster : dangerous experiments in the age of Enlightenment (Illustrated ed.). Chicago, IL: University of Chicago press. ISBN 978-0-226-16055-9.
- Edgeworth, Richard Lovell; Edgeworth, Maria (1820). "Art. XI. Memoirs of Richard Lovell Edgeworth Esq.". The London Quarterly Review. Vol. 23. London: Theodore Foster.
- Iles, Kate (2013). "Sidney, Sabrina (1756/7–1843)". Oxford Dictionary of National Biography (online ed.). Oxford University Press. doi:10.1093/ref:odnb/104873. (Subscription, Wikipedia Library access or UK public library membership required.)
- Moore, Wendy (2013). How to create the perfect wife. London: Weidenfeld & Nicolson. ISBN 978-0-297-86378-6.
- Oelkers, Jurgen (2014). Jean-Jacques Rousseau. London: Bloomsbury Publishing. ISBN 978-1-4411-1353-5.
- Rowland, Peter (2013). "Day, Thomas (1748–1789)". Oxford Dictionary of National Biography (online ed.). Oxford University Press. doi:10.1093/ref:odnb/7372. (Subscription, Wikipedia Library access or UK public library membership required.)
- Sadler, Michael (1928). Thomas Day: An English disciple of Rousseau. London: Cambridge University Press.
- Schama, Simon (2002). A History of Britain: Volume 3 The fate of the empire: 1776–2000. London: BBC Worldwide Ltd. ISBN 0-563-48880-8.
- Stewart, W. A. C.; McCann, W. P. (1967). Educational Innovators. London: Springer. ISBN 1-349-00531-2.
- Thorpe, Vanessa (18 April 2010). "Author unveils the story of real Prof Higgins and Eliza Doolittle". The Guardian.
- Uglow, Jenny (5 October 2002). "Educating Sabrina". The Guardian.
- Wilson, Henry (1822). "Thomas Day". Wonderful Characters: Comprising Memoirs and Anecdotes of the Most Remarkable Persons of Every Age and Nation, Volume 3. London: Robins, Albion Press.
- Youngman, Abigail (9 April 2015). "The Imperfect Education of Sabrina Sidney, Drama – BBC Radio 4". BBC.
