= Henry Syer Cuming =

British collector

Henry Syer Cuming FSA Scot (1817 – 7 October 1902) was a British collector of objects, art and antiquities, notable for exposing the Shadwell forgeries, and who bequeathed his collection to what is now the Cuming Museum, in Southwark, South London.

Cuming spent his life building on the work of his father Richard Cuming (1777–1870), a collector from Walworth in South East London. Father and son were both fascinated by collecting things from the everyday lives of people all over the world, but Cuming's interests were more local than his father's, and he pursued them more seriously. Cuming collected thousands of objects from the ordinary lives of south Londoners in the 1800s, from theatre adverts and rail tickets, to cheap toys and good luck charms. His collection included thousands of ancient objects dug up by labourers building the canals, docks and railways that profoundly changed London in the 18th and 19th centuries.

== Personal life ==
Born in 1817, Cuming was the second son of Richard Cuming Jr., and his wife Anne Warner (died 1853). Cuming lived with his parents and sister, Ann Bagwell Cuming (died 1893), first at 3 Dean's Row just off Walworth Road, and then 63 Kennington Park Road. Neither Henry nor Ann married, and all four lived together amicably until their various deaths. Cuming's elder brother, Richard Howton Cuming (died 1887) was disinherited by his father for marrying a Catholic; thus Cuming inherited his father's collection.

The Cumings enjoyed a comfortable existence and had sufficient funds and leisure for at least three generations of gentlemanly (and ladylike) pursuits.

== Shadwell forgeries ==
During Cuming's lifetime the growing antiques market trade was flooded with fakes which Cuming enjoyed collecting and exposing. In 1858, Cuming exposed what became known as the Shadwell forgeries, or the Billy and Charley fraud, at a meeting of the British Archaeological Association. This fraud, perpetuated by two Londoners, William (Billy) Smith and Charles (Charley) Eaton, involved the production of lead medallions, which the fraudsters then claimed to have found at Shadwell dock. Cuming's lecture was reported in The Athenaeum and The Gentleman's Magazine, causing a drastic reduction in sales of the medallions. Outraged, George Eastwood sued The Athenaeum for libel, but the judge found for the defendant; Cuming wrote "We gained a glorious victory". However, Smith and Eaton continued to sell their forgeries, and improved on their production process by making more delicate medals using cock metal, a copper and lead alloy, rather than lead alone. In 1964, Cuming again lectured to the British Archaeological Association regarding these forgeries; a year later, the value of the forgeries had declined so much so that Cuming was able to acquire them for a penny.

== Career and legacy ==
Cuming was a member of the British Archaeological Association from its formation in 1843, becoming secretary in 1856, and later, vice president. He edited the association's journal for several years, and gave lectures and published articles on the history of subjects ranging from slings to mistletoe. In 1867, Cuming became a fellow of the Society of Antiquaries of Scotland.

Cuming wrote extensively, providing in detail observations of contemporary everyday objects with a wide range of interests. He also created drawings of his objects, although he was not as well regarded as his fine amateur artist uncle John Brompton Cuming.

When Cuming died on 7 October 1902, he left the family's collection of 100,000 objects to the then parish of St Mary Newington, with the sum of £8,000 and instructions that the parish should open a museum bearing the family name. An addition was built onto the Newington Library building, and the museum was opened on 10 October 1906 by Lord Rothschild. Due to the wide array of items displayed, the Cuming Museum was billed upon opening as the "British Museum in miniature".

== Works ==
Over a 58-year period, Cuming published nearly 200 articles in the Journal of the British Archaeological Association, including:

- Cuming, H. Syer (1859). "On Celtic Antiquities Exhumed in Lincolnshire and Dorsetshire". Journal of the British Archaeological Association. 15 (3): 225–230. doi:10.1080/00681288.1859.11887121.
- Cuming, H. Syer (1882). "On seals of the Knights Templars". Journal of the British Archaeological Association. 38 (2): 122–126. doi:10.1080/00681288.1882.11887793.
- Cuming, H. Syer (1888). "On the relics and mementos of Mary Stuart". Journal of the British Archaeological Association. 44: 60–76. doi:10.1080/00681288.1888.11888013.
