= John Laurens Bicknell =

English solicitor and author

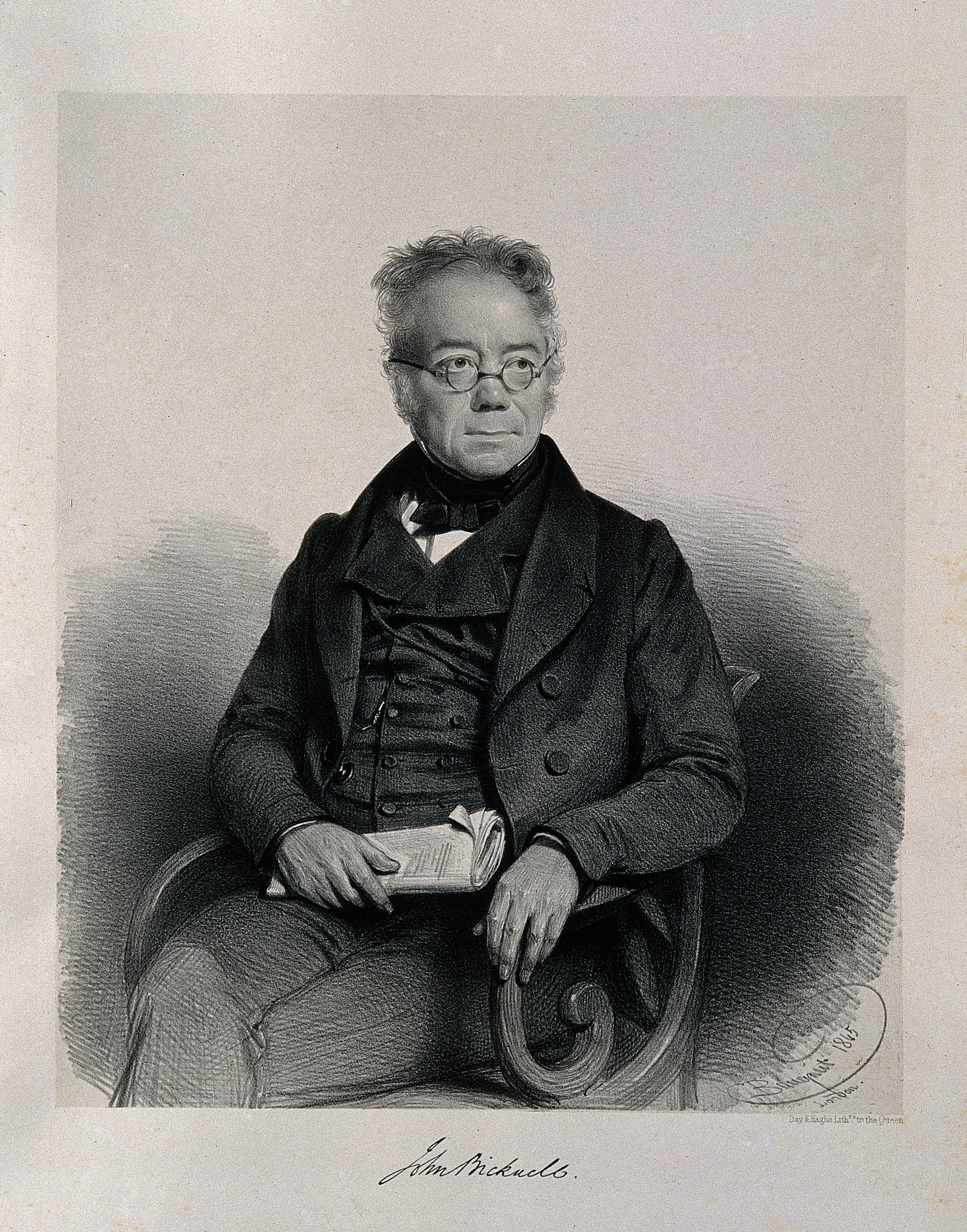
- John Bicknell, 1845 lithograph
- Born: 1786
- Died: 3 August 1845 (aged 58–59); Dover
- Occupations: solicitor and author

John Laurens Bicknell (c.1786 – 3 August 1845) was an English solicitor and author. He was elected a Fellow of the Royal Society in 1821.

== Life ==
He was the son of John Bicknell and his wife Sabrina Sidney. His name commemorated John Laurens, his father's friend, who died in 1782. He was educated at Charles Burney's school, where his mother worked, having been left little to live on when his father died in 1787.

In a successful legal career, Bicknell became solicitor to the Admiralty. He was Sir John Soane's solicitor from 1828, and an original trustee of the Soane Museum. He was a Fellow of the Royal Society and of the Society of Antiquaries of London, and died at Dover on 3 August 1845, aged 59.

== Works ==
- A Brief Vindication of the legality of the late proceedings against George Wilson, the Blackheath Pedestrian (1815), on the race walker George Wilson
- The Modern Church; a satirical poem (1820)
- Original Miscellanies, in prose and verse (1820)
- Psalms, selected for the service of the Church (2nd edition 1822)
- Reform in Parliament. a Letter to the Right Hon. George Tierney Suggesting a Practical and Constitutional Mode of Securing Purity of Election (1823)
- The Trial: a Serious Drama, by William Shakspeare and John Milton (undated)

== Family ==
Bicknell married in 1809 Jane Willmott, eldest daughter of Thomas Willmott, at Shoreham, Kent.
