= Lichfield Guildhall =

Municipal building in Lichfield, Staffordshire, England

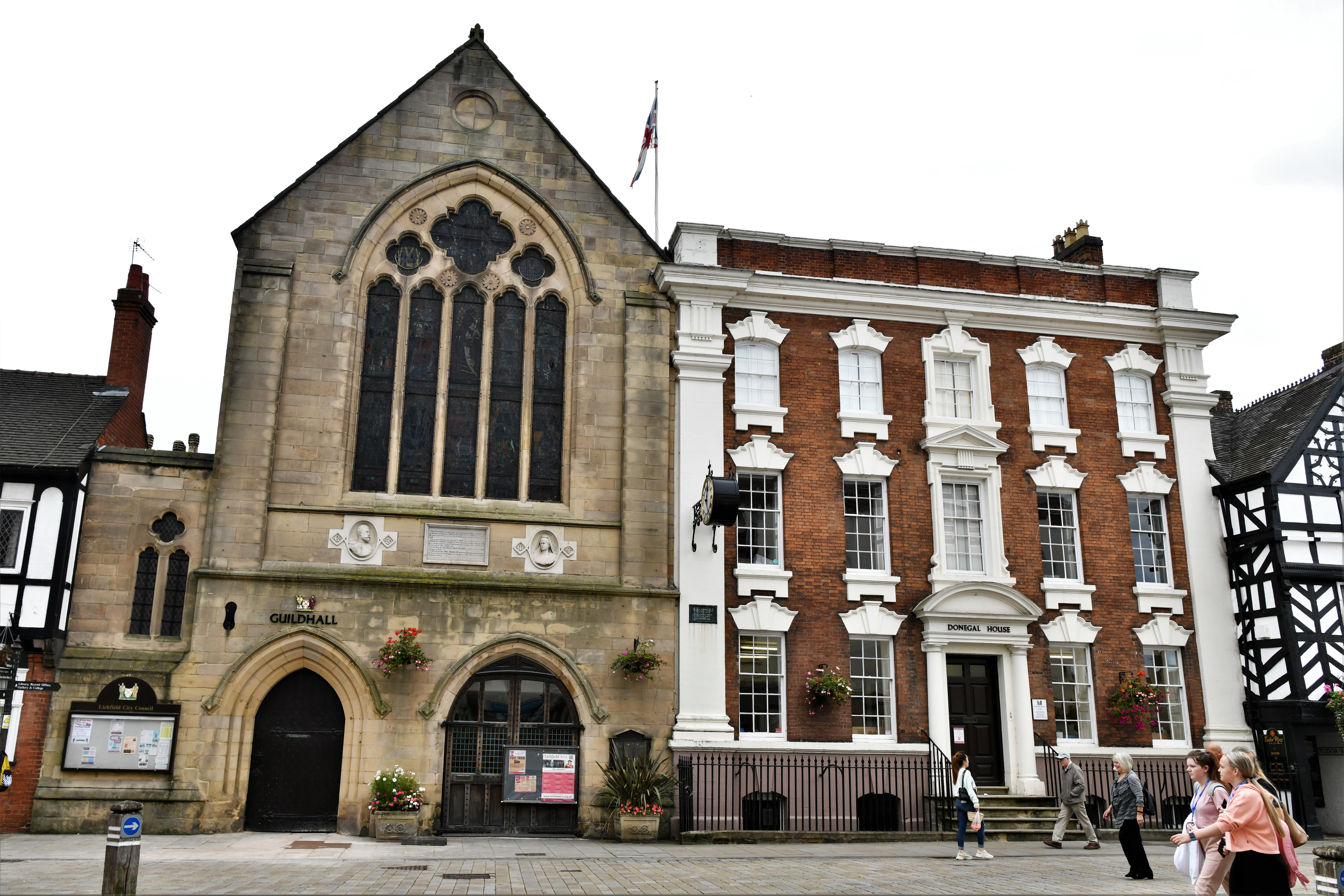
- The Guildhall to the left and Donegal House to the right

- Location within Staffordshire
- 52.683080°N 1.827182°W
- Location: Lichfield, Staffordshire

History
- Built: 1848

Site notes
- Architect: Joseph Potter Jnr
- Architectural style: Gothic-style

Listed Building – Grade II
- Designated: 6 March 1970
- Reference no.: 1187740

The Guildhall is a historic building in Bore Street in Lichfield, Staffordshire in the United Kingdom. The guildhall is a Grade II listed building.

== History ==
The guildhall takes its name from the ancient Guild of St Mary and St John the Baptist, whose hall stood from very early times on this site. It is not known when the first guildhall was erected but it is believed to have been around 1387, when King Richard II confirmed the incorporation of the Guild. Following the suppression of the chantries and religious guilds under King Edward VI in 1547, the property passed to the crown. The old prison for felons and debtors is at the rear of the building and has been in existence since 1553. From here have issued various convicts condemned to be publicly hanged at the gallows. The guildhall was rebuilt in 1707 and extended in 1741.

Most of the present ground floor, and the smaller rooms at first and second floor level at the rear of the building date from the early 18th century. A century later the building was once more in a very poor state of repair and, in 1844 the Conduit Lands Trust agreed to provide £2,500 and constructed the building. The hall and frontage was rebuilt between 1846 and 1848 by Joseph Potter Jnr. It is these works which created the gothic-style frontage to Bore Street and the panelled main hall on the first floor. This room is 87 ft long by 25 ft wide and, with its high pitched roof and hammer beams, has a fine medieval appearance. At the north end there is a large stone tracery stained-glass window by Betton & Evans of Shrewsbury. This was originally in the north transept of the Cathedral and was transferred to the guildhall in 1891. Below the window, on the outside, are busts of King George V and Queen Mary and a plaque commemorating their coronation.

For much of the 20th century the guildhall was the meeting place for Lichfield City Council but it ceased to be the local seat of government after the formation of Lichfield District Council in 1974. Nevertheless, the building has continued to be the meeting place of the local parish council, which is now known as Lichfield City Council.

Major refurbishment and repair works were completed in 2010 to restore this building, and to provide improved facilities for its use by the public. The main hall and various smaller rooms are hired out for public meetings, dances and as function rooms, and there is a programme of arts events and concerts run by the Lichfield District Arts Association. Civil marriages can take place at the guildhall. The guildhall is used for civic events including the ancient Court of Arraye and St George's Court. Public rooms include the main hall which accommodates 195 people, the smaller Guildroom which takes about 70 people and the Ashmole Room which has a capacity for 30 people.

The Ashmole Room in the guildhall contains some important works of art including a portrait of the antiquary, Elias Ashmole, by an artist referred to as J. Smith, a portrait of a Mrs Esther Day by James Millar and a portrait of a member of the Dyott family of Freeford Hall by an unknown artist. It also includes a prospect of Lichfield from the south-west by an unknown artist.

== See also ==
- Guild
- Guildhall
