= Alonso Carrió de la Vandera =

Spanish Civil Servant and Writer

Alonso Carrió de la Vandera (c. 1715 in Gijón – 1783 in Lima), also known as La Vandera and Concolorcorvo, was a Spanish civil servant, writer and traveller, who spent most of his life in the vast Spanish Viceroyalty of Peru, where he was for several years administrator of the Royal Mail.

== Biography ==
Carrió is most remembered as the author of El lazarillo de ciegos caminantes desde Buenos-Ayres hasta Lima (The Guide for the Inexperienced from Buenos Aires to Lima). This book was printed as published in Gijón, Spain, in 1773 and written by Calixto Bustamante Carlos, alias Concolorcorvo, from the memories that did Don Alonso Carrió de la Vandera; but investigators have proved that actually the work was edited in Lima in 1775 or 1776, and that the real author was Carrió himself.

Carrió's guide is a most interesting source of geographical, social and historical data for the middle South America (current Peru, Bolivia, Uruguay, and northern regions of Argentina) of his time, still showing in many passages the features of the Spanish picaresque novels, its title being a clear reference to the well-known Lazarillo de Tormes.

Significance of the work is increased by the fact that very few years later after its writing the Viceroyalty of the Río de la Plata was created by the Kingdom of Spain, thus splitting from the Viceroyalty of Peru all its lands East from the Andes range, and therefore decreasing dramatically travelling between Buenos Aires and Lima which is precisely the matter of Carrió's book.
