= Cuming Museum =

Former museum in Southwark, London, England

Coordinates: 51.490804°N 0.097162°W

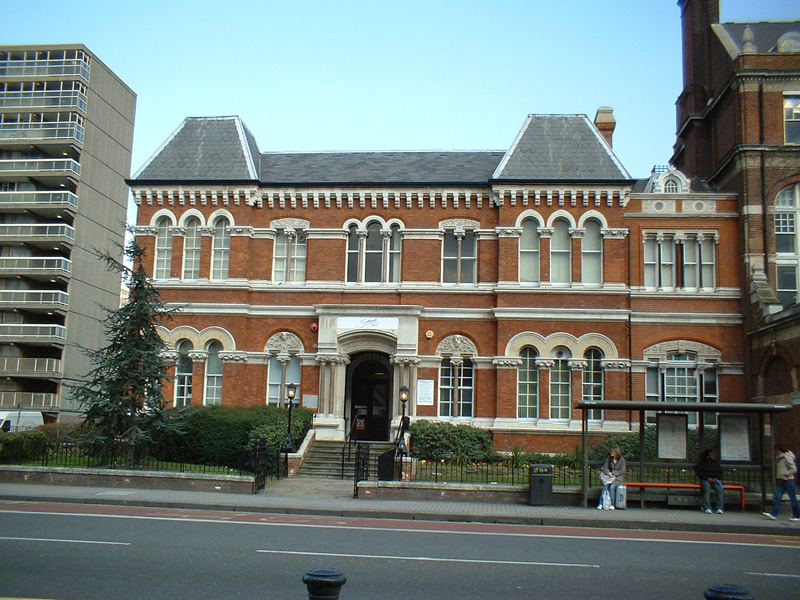
The Cuming Museum

The Cuming Museum in Walworth Road in Elephant and Castle, within the London Borough of Southwark, London, England, was a museum housing the collection of the Cuming family and later collections on Southwark's history. As of 2021, its collections have been rehoused in a new Southwark Heritage Centre.

== History ==
Richard Cuming (1777–1870) started his collecting life when he was only five years old, with some fossils and a coin that had been given to him by a family friend. That ignited a passion for collecting, which lasted for his lifetime. He made his first significant purchases in 1806 at the sale of the Leverian Museum. His interests covered geology, scientific equipment and animalia. The collection was bequeathed to the people of Southwark by his son, Henry Syer Cuming, in 1902, and the museum opened in 1906. As described in Cuming's will, it comprised "My Museum illustrative of Natural History, Archaeology and Ethnology with my coins and medals and... other curios".

The museum galleries were moved from the first floor of the Newington Public Library to the building next door, the former Walworth Town Hall, in 2006. On 25 March 2013, that building was seriously damaged by fire, severely affecting the museum galleries but leading to only a very small loss from the collections. Around 98% of objects on display at the time of the fire were recovered and were placed in storage to await a solution to the display of the collections and public access to them. The Cuming and local history collections have been re-displayed at the new Southwark Heritage Centre and Walworth Library, next door to the former town hall and library complex, which once housed the old Newington Library and Cuming Museum.
