= The Dying Negro =

1773 English abolitionist poem

The Dying Negro: A Poetical Epistle was a 1773 abolitionist poem published in England, by John Bicknell and Thomas Day. It has been called "the first significant piece of verse propaganda directed explicitly against the English slave systems". It was quoted in The Interesting Narrative of the Life of Olaudah Equiano of 1789.

== Details of publication ==
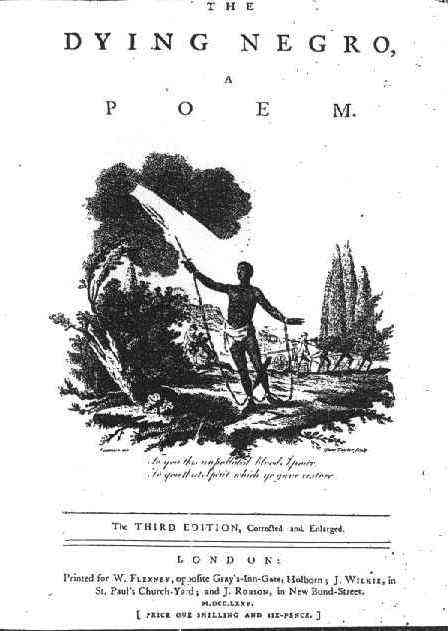
The Dying Negro, title page from third edition of 1775

The first draft of this pioneering work of abolitionist literature was written by Bicknell. Published versions were edited by Day, from 1773. The first edition was anonymous; in all there were six editions.

The work was dedicated to Jean-Jacques Rousseau. A substantial introduction by Day to the second edition (1774), and reproduced in later editions, attacked West Indian slaveowners, and drew a parallel with ancient Sparta. In the fifth edition of 1793, the names of both authors appeared.

== Background ==
The poem arose from a report in the Morning Chronicle and London Advertiser of 28 May 1773. It concerned a black servant of a Captain Ordington, who had intended to marry a white woman, being taken on board the Captain's vessel on the River Thames, and shooting himself. The 1772 English legal decision in Somerset v Stewart had been widely interpreted as a ruling abolishing slavery in England, and the implication of what had occurred to the servant was a reaction to an illegal deportation. Day expanded Bicknell's draft, added footnote material on Africa, and played up the "nobleness" of the African depicted in the story.

== Influence ==
The poem ends on a note suggesting future African vengeance. It was influential on later abolitionist writers. It has been suggested that The Negro Revenged, an illustration by Henry Fuseli to the poems of William Cowper, may also have been influenced by The Dying Negro.
