= John Bicknell =

English barrister and writer

John Bicknell, the elder (baptised 1746 – 27 March 1787), was an English barrister and writer. He was co-author with Thomas Day of the abolitionist poem The Dying Negro from 1773. Bicknell has also been credited with Musical Travels through England, a pseudonymous satire on Charles Burney.

== Life ==
The second son of Robert Bicknell of the Inner Temple, he was admitted to the Middle Temple in 1761. He was called to the bar at Lincoln's Inn in 1769.

Thomas Day was a friend from their time at Charterhouse School. Bicknell participated in the late 1760s in the initial stage of Day's plan to train a suitable wife from himself, at Shrewsbury orphanage.

Bicknell befriended John Laurens, then a law student in London of his brother Charles Bicknell, around 1774. Considered a rake, his attitude to his legal career was negligent, and he spent time on writing. He was a commissioner of bankruptcy.

Bicknell died on 27 March 1787 four weeks after suffering a stroke.

== Works ==
The Dying Negro (1773) is thought to have originated in a draft by Bicknell, then passed to Day who worked it up for publication.

Some of his contemporaries credited Bicknell with the Musical Travels published in 1774 under the pseudonym "Joel Collier". This attribution is also accepted by modern scholars, and was supported soon after Bicknell's death, by William Seward, who knew Bicknell and introduced James Boswell to him, in 1786. It was endorsed by Francis Douce and John Thomas Smith. Seward also identified a number of short satirical pieces in newspapers, that had been attributed to George Steevens, to Bicknell.

== Family ==
Bicknell on 16 April 1784 married, at St Philip's Church, Birmingham, Sabrina Sidney, the girl he had selected with Thomas Day at Shrewsbury about 15 years earlier. She had spent some time living with Bicknell's mother. After Day dropped his plan to marry her, she had remained a ward of Richard Lovell Edgeworth, and lived in the West Midlands.

After Bicknell's death she became housekeeper and manager for Charles Burney the younger, a schoolfellow of her late husband at Charterhouse. There were two sons of the marriage, John Laurens Bicknell and Henry Edgeworth Bicknell, young boys on their father's death. Sabrina as widow had financial support from Day and Edgeworth, and George Hardinge and Anna Seward organised collections for her. John Laurens Bicknell, educated at Burney's school, became a solicitor and Fellow of the Royal Society.

Charles Bicknell, John's younger brother and solicitor to the Admiralty and the Prince Regent, became father-in-law to John Constable. His eldest daughter Maria Elizabeth Bicknell married Constable in 1816.
