= Thomas Day (writer) =

English author, lawyer and abolitionist (1748–1789)

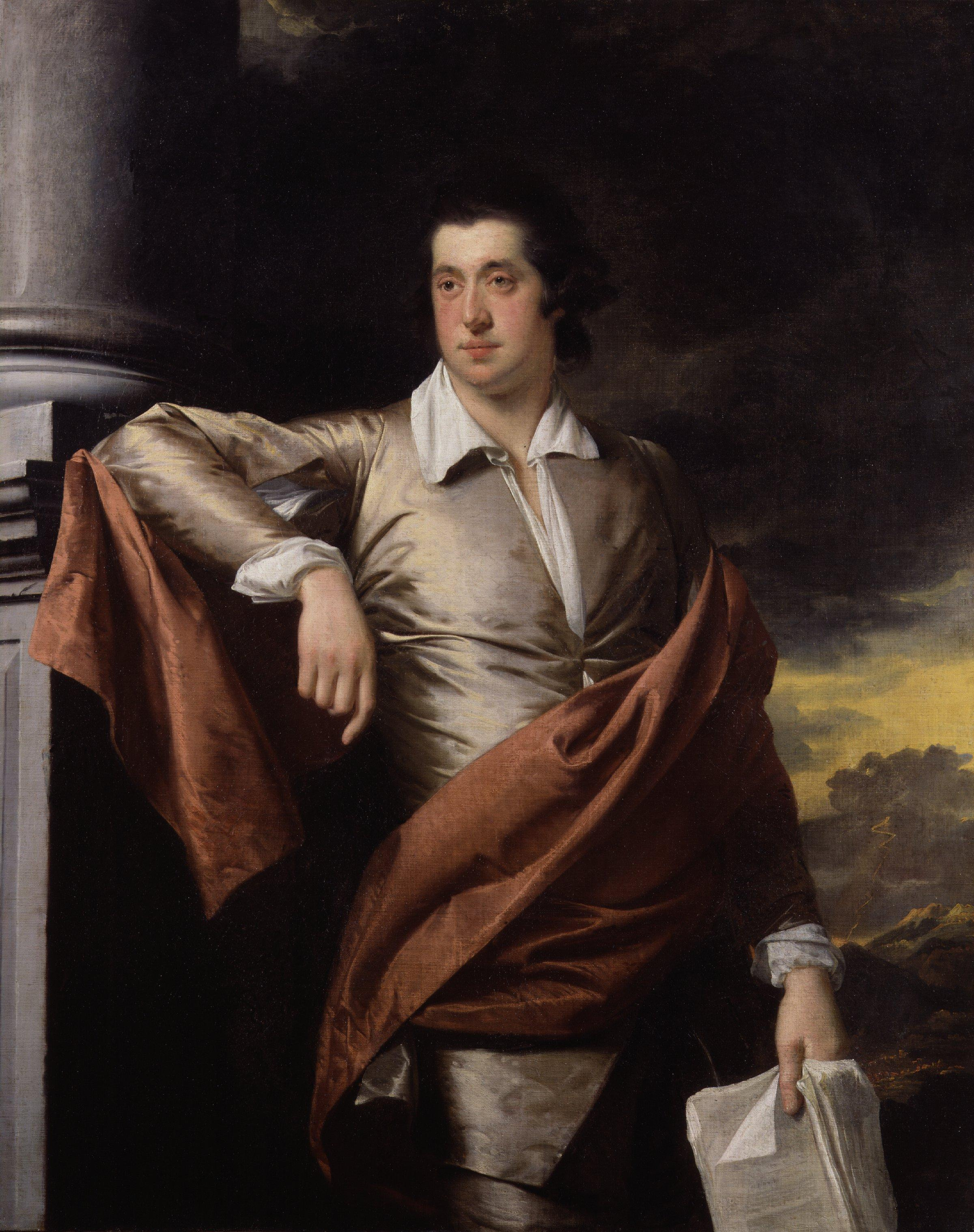
- Portrait by Joseph Wright of Derby, 1770
- Born: 22 June 1748; London, England
- Died: 28 September 1789 (aged 41); Barehill, Berkshire
- Occupations: Author, lawyer
- Spouse: Esther Milnes
- Writing career
- Genres: Children's literature, politics, satire
- Notable work: The History of Sandford and Merton

Thomas Day (22 June 1748 – 28 September 1789) was an English writer, lawyer and abolitionist. He was well known for the book The History of Sandford and Merton (1783–1789) which emphasized Rousseauvian educational ideals, for his writings against slavery, for campaigning both for and against American independence, and for his project applying his educational ideals to young girls with the aim of raising a wife for himself.

== Early life ==
Day was born on 22 June 1748 in London, the only child of Thomas and Jane Day. His father died when he was about a year old, but left him wealthy. He first attended a school in Stoke Newington, Middlesex, where the family lived at what is now 109-111 Church Street, but after a bout of smallpox which left his face permanently scarred he was moved to Charterhouse School. He subsequently attended Corpus Christi College, Oxford, where he became a master debater and developed a close friendship with William Jones; he did not graduate and left the college in 1767.

== Life ==
Day moved back to his family estate at Barehill, Berkshire, in 1766. There he met the progressive educator and inventor Richard Lovell Edgeworth, from whom he became almost inseparable. Together they resolved to educate Edgeworth's son, Dick, in the style of Jean-Jacques Rousseau's Emile. Edgeworth and the project converted Day to Rousseauism. He declared in 1769 that the two books he would save, were all the world's books to be destroyed, would be the Bible and Emile. Day, Edgeworth and his son would later visit Rousseau in France. Because of his connection with Edgeworth, Day joined the Lunar Society in Lichfield, despite describing himself as a philosopher rather than a scientist, and formed friendships with Erasmus Darwin and Anna Seward.

=== Sabrina Sidney ===
After this education project, Day undertook a second: he tried to train a wife. According to Anna Seward (who nevertheless observed that "there was no finding such a creature ready made"), his demands were immodest: "He resolved, if possible, that his wife should have a taste for literature and science, for moral and patriotic philosophy. So might she be his companion in that retirement, to which he had destined himself; and assist him forming the minds of his children to stubborn virtue and high exertion. He resolved also, that she should be simple as a mountain girl, in her dress, her diet and her manners, fearless and intrepid as the Spartan wives and Roman heroines."

Using Edgeworth's name, Day applied to the Foundling Hospital to take first one and then another girl, initially aged 12 and 11; he told the Hospital that they were to be apprenticed as maids in Edgeworth's household, which Edgeworth did not know of until several months later. He renamed them from Ann Kingston and Dorcas Car to Sabrina Sidney and Lucretia, respectively. What last name he chose for 'Lucretia' is not known. He made a donation of fifty pounds to the Foundling Hospital and was appointed a member of the governing board.

After living in London with Sabrina Sidney for some time, Day took both girls to France in November 1769. His motives are unclear, as Day was a committed Francophobe, but leaving the country put him out of the reach of British law and the lawyers of the Foundling Hospital, who had been known to sue apprentice-masters who mistreated their apprentices. It also let him isolate the girls; he refused to hire English-speaking staff and would not let anyone teach the girls French. At one time he challenged a French military officer to a duel for speaking to one of the girls.

In the spring of 1770, Day decided that Lucretia, then aged 12, could not satisfy him intellectually as a wife, and returned to England, placing her in the home of a milliner's family in Ludgate Hill with a payment of £400. With Sabrina, he leased Stowe House in Lichfield, near Edgeworth and the Lunar Society. At this point he still had not informed Sabrina, then aged 13, of his designs, and told her she was apprenticed to him as a servant. According to Rousseau, who had described how children should be taught not to fear pain or physical hardship, Day embarked on a programme of 'lessons,' including dripping hot candle-wax onto Sabrina's arms and forcing her to wade into cold water up to her neck. He also shot at her skirts with a pistol; accounts are divided on whether it was loaded. By 1771, Day had decided to abandon his 'experiment,' and sent Sabrina to stay at a boarding school for the rest of her childhood.

Still living in Lichfield, he proposed marriage to Honora Sneyd, who would later marry his friend Edgeworth, and then proposed the same to her sister Elizabeth, who was briefly engaged to him but broke it off.

He met Esther Milnes (1753–1792), an heiress from Chesterfield, and they were married on 7 August 1778. The couple subsequently moved to a small estate at Stapleford Abbotts, near Abridge in Essex. They lived a very ascetic lifestyle and Esther was not allowed to contact her family. In 1780, the couple moved to Anningsley in Surrey, when Day bought a new estate there. It was a philanthropic project for both husband and wife and they laboured to improve the conditions of the working classes around them.

== Publications and political works ==
In 1773, Day published his first work—The Dying Negro—a poem he had written with John Bicknell. It tells the story of a runaway slave, and sold well.

The contradiction between the claim that "all men are created equal" and the existence of American slavery attracted comment from some quarters when the United States Declaration of Independence was first published; Congress, having made a few changes in wording, deleted nearly a fourth of the draft before publication, most notably removing a passage critical of the slave trade, as there were members of Congress who owned black slaves. Day was among those who noted the discrepancy, writing in 1776:

If there be an object truly ridiculous in nature, it is an American patriot, signing resolutions of independency with the one hand, and with the other brandishing a whip over his affrighted slaves.

Day decided to study the law and in 1776 was admitted to Lincoln's Inn; he rarely practised.

Day argued for the rights of the American colonists in his poem "The Devoted Legions" (1776) and in 1780 he argued in Parliament for an early peace with the revolutionaries as well as parliamentary reform. His speeches were also published as pamphlets.

It was as a writer for children that Day made his reputation. The History of Little Jack (1787) was extremely popular, but it could not match the sales of The History of Sandford and Merton (1783, 1786, 1789) which was a bestseller for over a hundred years. Embracing Rousseau's dictates in many ways, it narrates the story of the rich, noble but spoiled Tommy Merton and his poor but virtuous friend Harry Sandford. Through trials and stories, Harry and the boys' tutor teach Tommy the importance of labor and the evils of the idle rich.

== Death ==
Day believed that the traditional practice of breaking-in horses was harsh and unnecessary, and that if an animal was treated well, the need for severity could be avoided. He attempted to put his theory to the test with a colt on 28 September 1789 at Barehill, Berkshire, but was thrown from the horse, and died almost instantly. He was buried at St Mary's Church, Wargrave, Berkshire.

== See also ==
- List of abolitionist forerunners

== Bibliography ==
=== References ===
- Armitage, David (born 1965) (2007). The Declaration of Independence: A Global History. Harvard University Press. pp. 76–77. doi:10.2307/j.ctv1ks0hkk.1; LCCN 2006-50102; ISBN 978-0-6740-2282-9 (2007); ISBN 978-0-6740-2027-6 (e-book; 2008); ISBN 978-0-6740-3032-9 (2008); OCLC 71173909 (all editions)
1. Armitage, David (2007). Via Internet Archive (Marin County Free Library). Harvard University Press. ISBN 978-0-674-02282-9. (Preview Only → Borrow Unavailable → see Hachette v. Internet Archive)
2. Via Google Books (limited preview). 2007.
3. Via Google Books (limited preview). 2007.
4. Via Google Books (limited preview). 2007.
5. Via Google Books (limited preview). 2007.
6. Via JSTOR j.ctv1ks0hkk.1. JSTOR j.ctv1ks0hkk. Archived from the original on 2 August 2024.
- Blackman, John (1862). A Memoir of the Life and Writings of Thomas Day, Author of 'Sandford and Merton'. London: John Bedford Leno. Retrieved February 5, 2019.
1. Via HathiTrust (University of Michigan).
2. Via Internet Archive (University of Michigan). John Bedford Leno, 56 , Drury Lane, W.C. 1862.
3. Via Google Books (University of Michigan).
- Chandler, Anne (24 November 1997). "Defying 'Development': Thomas Day's Queer Curriculum in Sandford and Merton". In Sedgwick, Eve Kosofsky (ed.). Novel Gazing: Queer Readings in Fiction. Durham, North Carolina: Duke University Press. pp. 201–226. ISBN 0-8223-8247-4.
1. Via Google Books (limited preview).
- Day, Thomas (1784) [1831]. Fragment of an Original Letter on the Slavery of the Negroes, Written in the Year 1776, by Thomas Day, Esq. London: Printed for John Stockdale (London) & Printed by Francis Bailey (Philadelphia). LCCN 07-9405; OCLC 879432564 (all editions).
1. Via Internet Archive (Johns Hopkins University) (11 pages). Boston: Re-Printed by Garrison and Knapp (1831). 1831. p. 10.
2. Via Google Books (Oxford University). 1784. pp. 1–40 [33].
- Gignilliat, George Warren, Jr., PhD (1894–1985) (1932). The Author of Sandford and Merton: A Life of Thomas Day, Esq. Columbia University Press. Retrieved February 5, 2019. LCCN 32-10868; ISBN 978-0-2319-3110-6; OCLC 720343 (all editions).
1. Via Internet Archive (University of California). 1932.
2. Via Google Books (San Francisco Public Library). (search only).
- Jefferson, Cord, "A British Intellectual's Mission 'To Create The Perfect Wife'" (review) Archived 1 November 2017 at the Wayback Machine, NPR, 30 April 2013.
- Keir, James (1791). An Account of the Life and Writings of Thomas Day, Esq. London, England: John Stockdale.
- Maginn, James (1794–1842), ed. (November 1832). "Miss Edgeworth's Tales and Novels". Fraser's Magazine for Town and Country. Vol. 6, no. 34. London: James Fraser. pp. 541–558. hdl:2027/umn.31951000742903o.
1. Via HathiTrust (Minnesota). hdl:2027/umn.31951000742903o.
2. Via Google Books (UC Boulder).
- Moore, Wendy (born 1952) (2013). How to Create the Perfect Wife. New York: Basic Books. Retrieved July 31, 2024. LCCN 2012-48149; ISBN 978-0-4650-6573-8 (e-book); ISBN 978-0-2978-6378-6 (hard cover); ISBN 978-0-4650-6574-5 (hard cover); OCLC 802293830 (all editions).
1. Moore, Wendy (2013). Via Internet Archive. Basic Books. ISBN 978-0-465-06574-5. (Borrow Unavailable → see Hachette v. Internet Archive)
2. Via Google Books (limited preview).
3. Via Google Books (limited preview).
- Rowland, Peter, ed. (2004). "Thomas Day". Oxford Dictionary of National Biography. Vol. 15: "Daly–Dewar". In Association with the British Academy: from the Earliest Times to the Year 2000. Oxford University Press. pp. 602–603. Retrieved May 20 2007. Rowland, Peter (2004). "10.1093/ref:odnb/7372". Oxford Dictionary of National Biography (article) (online ed.). Oxford University Press. doi:10.1093/ref:odnb/7372. (Subscription, Wikipedia Library access or UK public library membership required.); ISBN 978-0-1986-1365-7 (Vol. 15); ISBN 978-0-1986-1411-1 (all 60 volumes); OCLC 4916045573 (article).
1. Via Internet Archive. 2004.
- Scott, Samuel Haslam (1875–1960) (1935). The Exemplary Mr. Day, 1748–1789. London: Faber and Faber – via Google Books (snippet view only). LCCN 35-11027; LCCN 35-6153 OCLC 543701 (all editions).
- Seymour, Miranda (23 June 2013). "Do as I Say". The New York Times Book Review. p. 18. Archived from the original on 7 February 2019. ISSN 0028-7806 (publication); ProQuest 1372739425 (article).
1. Seymour, Miranda (21 June 2013). Via New York Times Book Review blog. The New York Times. Archived from the original on 7 February 2019.
- Stuart, Gilbert (1755–1828), ed. (June 1784). "Miscellaneous – Art. 17: Fragment of an Original Letter, on the Slavery of the Negroes; Written in the Year 1776, by Thomas Day, Esq. 1S. Stockdale. 1784". The English Review, Or, An Abstract of English and Foreign Literature (review). Vol. 3. London: John Murray. p. 470. LCCN sf98-94074; OCLC 7200101 (all editions).
1. Via Google Books (Oxford University).
- Uglow, Jenny (2002). The Lunar Men: Five Friends Whose Curiosity Changed the World. New York: Farrar, Straus and Giroux. Retrieved July 31, 2024. LCCN 2002-72353; ISBN 978-0-3741-9440-6; OCLC 49959314 (all editions).
1. Via Internet Archive (San Leandro High School). Farrar, Straus and Giroux. 2002. ISBN 978-0-9654950-0-4.
- Uglow, Jenny (5 October 2002). "Thomas Day's Dreams of Pedagogy – Educating Sabrina". Guardian Review. p. 35. Retrieved March 18, 2015. ISSN 0261-3077 (print newspaper); ISSN 1756-3224 (online newspaper); OCLC 877263919 (all editions) (book review supplement) & 1262733785 (book review supplement).
1. Uglow, Jenny (5 October 2002). Via Guardian Review blog. The Guardian.
2. Via Newspapers.com. Archived from the original on 24 January 2025.
