= Poland Street =

Thoroughfare in Soho, London

Coordinates: 51°30′56.55″N 0°8′15.52″W

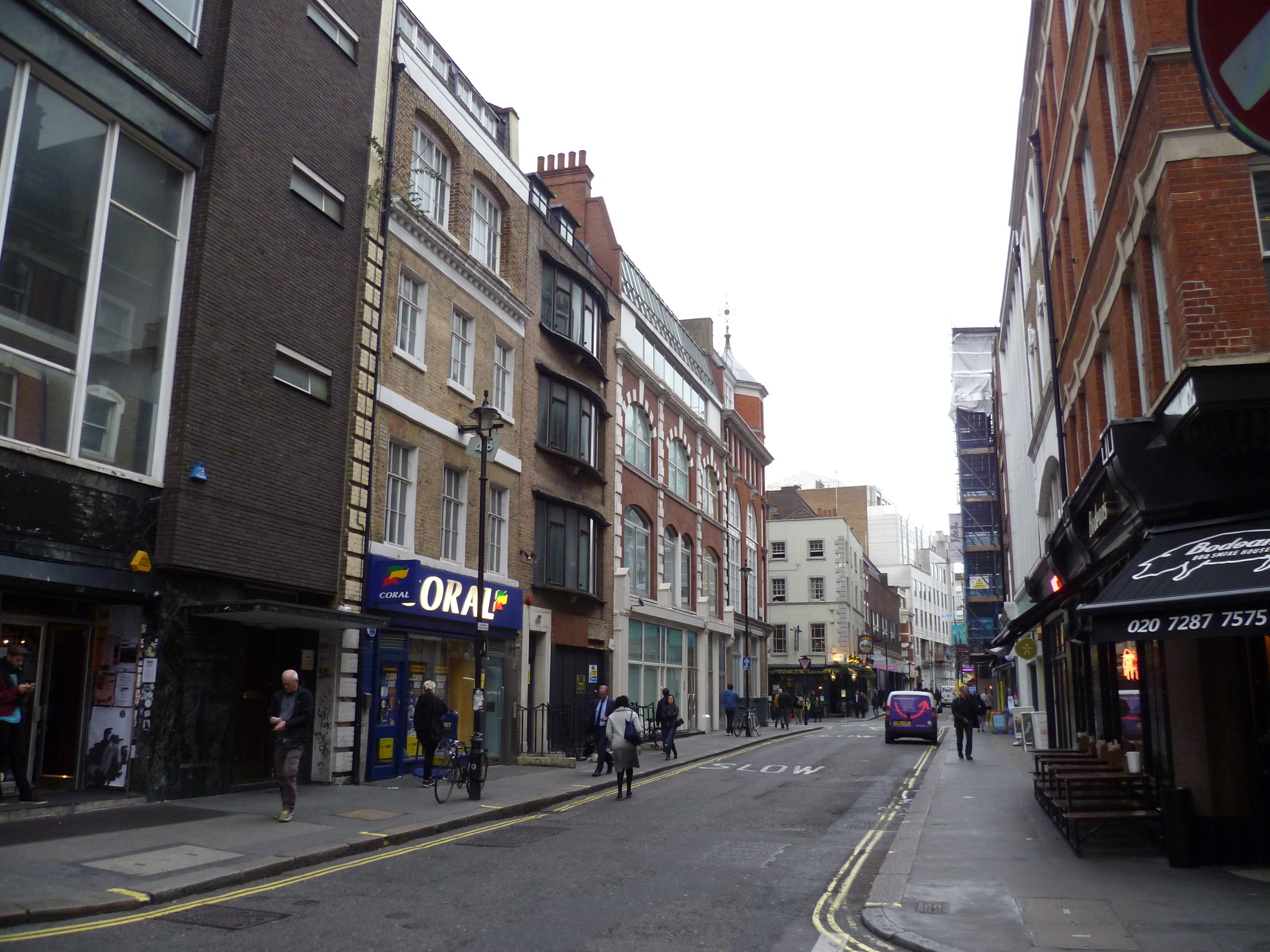
Poland Street

Poland Street is a street in the Soho district of the City of Westminster, London. It runs from Oxford Street in the north to Broadwick Street in the south. It was named after the "King of Poland" pub, which was renamed in honour of Poland's King John III Sobieski in the heading of a coalition of western armies, crucially defeated the invading Ottoman forces at the 1683 Battle of Vienna. In the eighteenth century, Polish Protestants settled around Poland Street as religious refugees fleeing the Polish Counterreformation.

It was the site of the St James Workhouse whose infirmary may have been the original St. James Infirmary (see plan). The lane that led into the workhouse is now the driveway to Q-Park Soho garage.

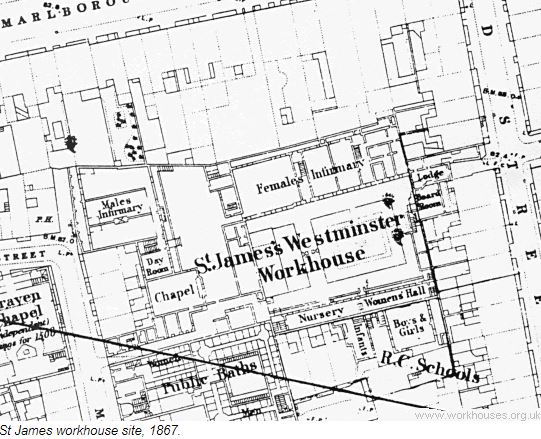
St. James Parish Workhouse with infirmary, Poland Street, London

== Notable residents ==
The poet Percy Bysshe Shelley lived at 15 Poland Street.

The poet William Blake lived at 28 Poland Street until 1791. The original building has since been rebuilt.

The writer Fanny Burney had her childhood home (1760–1770) at 50 Poland Street. In 1909, nearby Portland Street was renamed D'Arblay Street in her honour, after her married name of Madame D'Arblay. Her father was the musicologist Charles Burney, whose other children, also living there, included writer Sarah Burney, explorer James Burney, and classicist Charles Burney.

Charles Thomas Bale was a still life painter who worked in London during the second half of the 19th century. Little is known of the artist's life, except that he lived at 9 Poland Street in London in 1872.

The bookbinders Sangorski and Sutcliffe operated from 1-5 Poland Street for much of the 20th century, famously under Stanley Bray, and for a time shared space with the Golden Cockerel press under Christopher Sandford, who employed S&S for their fine bindings. Sandford also went on to co-found the Folio society.
