= Music articles in Rees's Cyclopaedia =

The music articles in Rees's Cyclopaedia were Charles Burney's (1726-1814) final literary production, and form in effect the Dictionary of Music he never wrote. There were additional articles by John Farey, Sr. (1766-1826), and John Farey, Jr. (1791-1851). The listings show there are 1971 articles in total: Burney, 1752 (996 general music plus 756 biographies), Farey Sr. 215, and Farey Jr. 4.

The complete texts and plates are available on the website of the Burney Centre at McGill University.

The articles were to be illustrated by 63 engraved plates as well as numerous examples of music, typeset within text matter of the articles. There were to be 38 plates of musical examples illustrating fingering, counterpoint etc., 15 illustrating musical instruments, 4 illustrating the organ, 4 illustrating dramatic machinery, and 2 miscellaneous plates of with more musical instruments. According to a note added to the catalogue of plates in Vol 39 of Rees, ten of the musical examples were to illustrate the music of Haydn and Mozart as well as national airs of England, Scotland, Ireland and Wales etc., but this plan were discarded to save cost, so the plates were never produced. So the actual number of plates published was 53.

Each entry in the lists has a length in columns. A column has approximately 670 words, so it is possible to gauge the length of each article. While the majority of the articles have some length, 337 or 6% are brief (3 or 4 lines or fewer), dictionary definitions, or cross references. Many of the former are terms derived from French and Italian. The encyclopaedic-length articles are usually longer than Burney's earlier published writings on the same topic.

It is clear that when the work was being published, a number of the printed sheets were re-imposed, with additional material, so bound sets of the work can vary slightly.

Charles Burney was well known as the author of A General History of Music, 4 vol, 1776–1789 and two travel diaries recording his Musical Tours collecting information in France and Italy, and later Germany, 1+2 vol, 1771 and 1773, as well as the Commoration of Handel, 1785 and his Musical Memoirs of Metastasio, 1796. Burney wrote the articles for Rees between 1801 and 1805, and continued to revise them as they were due for publication until about 1808. Burney died in 1814, and the articles continued to appear posthumously until the final volume, in 1819. After Burney's death, a writer in The Harmonicon, and later, editors of early editions of Grove, claimed that most of the articles in Rees were 'extracted without alteration from his History of Music.' This is certainty true in some instances but Burney also re-wrote material from his earlier writings for the Rees articles and expanded it there. There is much completely new information covering the musical events of the last quarter of the eighteenth century and the first years of the nineteenth. The lists of articles have been annotated to show where the information had previously appeared from Mercer's edition of his History and Scholes's edition of his Musical Tours, and these also serve to indicate which of the articles were completely new to the Cyclopaedia. As well as named articles, Burney also contributed musical material in paragraphs included in other topics, such as the British royalty, where he discussed the musical life of many of the reigns.

As well as general musical topics, Burney also wrote biographies of musicians. Much was taken from his earlier publications but there is a considerable body of new material drawn from his own knowledge mostly of the London musical scene, where he recorded minor personalities and musical events. In the biographies of a number of people not usually associated with music, such as Voltaire and Dryden. Burney's contribution appears, unsigned, after the references section for the main body of the piece (see section 4.3, above). In a number of instances the biographies only have the surname; added Christian names here are in square brackets ([]).

In addition to these topics, Burney also wrote articles relating to the theatrical world, mostly accounts of theatres and pleasure gardens.

As well as material by Alexander Malcolm (1685-1763) which had appeared in the 1781–6 edition of Chambers's Cyclopadia, it is known that Burney made extensive use in his Rees articles of the writings of previous authors: Rousseau, Jean-Benjamin de La Borde, Giovanni Battista Martini, Johann Christoph Pepusch, Sébastien de Brossard etc. Some modern scholars, have commented about instances, but it is beyond the scope of this encyclopaedic article to attempt a comprehensive annotated survey of all the sources Burney used.

John Farey, Sr. (1766–1826) was a polymath, well known today for his work as a geologist and for his investigations of mathematics. He was greatly interested in the mathematics of sound, and the schemes of temperament used in tuning musical instruments then. He was a prolific contributor to contemporary journals, such as the Philosophical Magazine, and the Monthly Magazine as well as the Edinburgh Encyclopædia on this topic. His articles for Rees abound in extensive mathematical calculations sometimes extending to many places of decimals, as this brief example from Vol 18 shows:

INCOMPOSIT Ditone of the Enharmonic Genus is the excess of a fourth tone above half a tone major, or 3² ÷ 8 root 2, which is 202 Σ + 4f + 17½m, or 202.00393 Σ + 4f + 17½m, whose common logarithm is .9006375.2462, and its Euler's log. = .330076, and it contains 18.41741 major commas.

Farey fell out with Rees in 1811 over his geological writings, and it appears he gave up his musical contributions as well. Any which appeared after that date must have been supplied previously.

Like his father, John Farey, Jr. (1791–1851) was polymathic in his interests. He contributed numerous drawings for the illustrations of mostly technological and scientific topics in Rees, and would have contributed the written descriptions of them. They are always linked by key-letters to the details of the drawings. The procedure would have been for Farey to make the drawing first, after usually inspecting and measuring the object, then write the description of it, with the key letters, which were then engraved on the plate for final printing. The plates for dramatic machinery, the organ and barrel organ are by him.

Beginning with Dr Percy Scholes, in 1938, modern scholars have mined Rees for Burney's writings, and have commented on the desirability of publishing a listing of them.

== See also ==
- List of general music articles in Rees's Cyclopaedia
- List of music biographies in Rees's Cyclopaedia
- List of music plates in Rees's Cyclopaedia

== Sources ==
- Mercer, Frank, ed. Charles Burney, A general History of Music, 2 vol. 1935, rep 1957 [Originally published in 4 volumes, 1776-1789]
- Scholes, P. A., The Oxford Companion to Music, 1938 (and later eds) [Frequent citations to Burney's Rees articles, and also some illustrations from the work.]
- Scholes, P. A., 'A New Enquiry into the Life and Work of Dr Burney', Proceedings of the Musical Association 67th Session, 1940-1941, pp 1–30. [pp 24–5 has section 'Burney an Encyclopaedist'.]
- Scholes, P. A., The Great Dr Burney, 1948, Vol 2, pp 184–201, chapter LVIII, "Virtues and vagaries of a septuagenarian encyclopædist" [Throughout his biography Scholes made reference to, and some times quoted from, Burney's articles in Rees.]
- Scholes, P. A., Dr Burney's Musical Tours in Europe, 2 vol, OUP 1959, [Scholes makes a number of references to, and quotations from Burney's Rees articles]
- Lonsdale, Roger, Dr Charles Burney: a Literary Biography, OUP 1965, pp 407–431, chapter X, "Burney and Rees's Cyclopædia"
- Lonsdale, Roger, 'Dr Burney's 'Dictionary of Music' ',Musicology Australia, vol. 5, no. 1, pp. 159–171, 1979 [An account of Burney's Rees articles, with criticism of Scholes's discussion of them.]
- Kassler, Jamie Croy, The Science of Music in Britain: A Catalogue of writings, Lectures and Inventions, 2 vol, Garland, 1979 [Both Burney and Farey sr. appear often in the Index. Rees's Cyclopaedia and music is discussed at pp 1200–1204.]
- Grant, Kerry S., Dr Burney as Critic and Historian of Music. UMI Research Press, Ann Arbor, Michigan, 1983.[Throughout this book Grant made reference to, and some times quoted from, Burney's articles in Rees.]
- Klima, Slava, Bowers, Garry, and Grant, Kerry S., Memoirs of Dr Charles Burney, 1726-1769, University of Nebraska Press. Lincoln and London, 1988.[Throughout this book the authors made reference to, and frequently quoted from, Burney's articles in Rees.]
