= Susan Burney =

English writer (1755–1800)

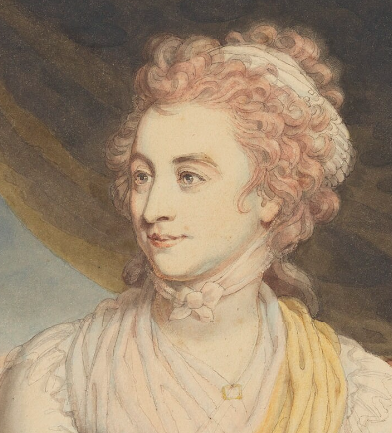
- Burney's portrait by her cousin Edward Francis Burney, c. 1777
- Born: Susanna Elizabeth Burney; 7 January 1755; King's Lynn, England
- Died: 6 January 1800 (aged 44); Parkgate, Cheshire, England
- Other name: Susanna Elizabeth Phillips
- Known for: Letters and journals
- Spouse: Molesworth Phillips (m. 1782; died 1800)

Susanna Elizabeth Burney, later known as Susanna Elizabeth Phillips (7 January 1755 – 6 January 1800), was an English writer. She wrote 650,000 words and her letters are said to be "the most important source on opera in the period".

== Life ==
Burney was born in King's Lynn on a day in January 1755 which was either the 4th or the 7th. She was the fourth child and third daughter of Dr. Charles Burney (1726–1814) and his first wife, Esther Sleepe (c.1725–1762). Her father's children included the seafarer James Burney, the writer Frances "Fanny" Burney, the scholar Charles Burney and the writer Sarah Harriet Burney. Her elder sister Esther went with her in 1764 when their father took them to France to improve their French. Burney was in France until 1766, learning the language which was thought likely to improve her prospects of employment as a governess. At some point, she also gained a good knowledge of Italian.

She was the child in the Burney family who was most interested in music, which was her father's expertise. He was an organist who became known for his writing after he published books on the music of France, the Netherlands, Italy and Germany. She and her sister Fanny were very close: the singer Gaspare Pacchierotti said they had "one mind", although it was Susanna who loved his "divine" castrato singing and as usual recorded these thoughts in her journal letters. Her letters were all addressed to Fanny, and Fanny wrote all her journal letters to her. Susan's letters have proved to be a valuable source about society and music, and also history – including her eye-witness account of the Gordon Riots.

When Fanny secretly wrote and published her first novel Evelina, they were both involved in the cover-up.

She married Molesworth Phillips in 1782. He was a marine who had sailed with her brother, James. Her brother and her new husband had sailed with Captain James Cook to Hawaii and had witnessed his death. Her husband had been injured in the squabble with islanders when Cook had been killed. The newly married couple lived in Ipswich until they returned for the birth of their daughter in October. She was named after her favourite sister, Fanny. The three of them lived at Chessington Hall with a dramatist friend of their fathers, Samuel Crisp, until he died in the following year.

Her third child, William (Willy), was born in 1791.

In 1796 she travelled to Ireland to see her son and her estranged husband. His affair with Burney's cousin was not a secret, and Burney's health was affected by the situation.

== Death and legacy ==
Burney died at Parkgate near Chester, having recently sailed to England to escape mistreatment by her husband.

Her letters and journals survive. She is estimated to have written 650,000 words in her lifetime. There is a Susan Burney Letters Project at the University of Nottingham and her writings are held by the New York Public Library, the British Museum and Yale University Library. Her letters are said to be "by far the most important source on opera in the period" especially as they were not used by later historians.

After her death, her sister Fanny stopped writing her journal letters to her, but encouraged by her husband she persevered and addressed new letters to her son.
