= Frances Burney (1776–1828) =

English playwright and governess

- Born: 1776
- Died: 1826 (aged 49–50); Bath, Somerset
- Occupations: writer; governess
- Relatives: Frances Burney (aunt); Sarah Burney (aunt); Charles Burney (grandfather)
- Writing career
- Language: English
- Notable works: Tragic dramas; chiefly intended for representation in private families (1818)

Frances Burney (1776–1828) was an English playwright and governess, named for her famous aunt.

== Life and work ==
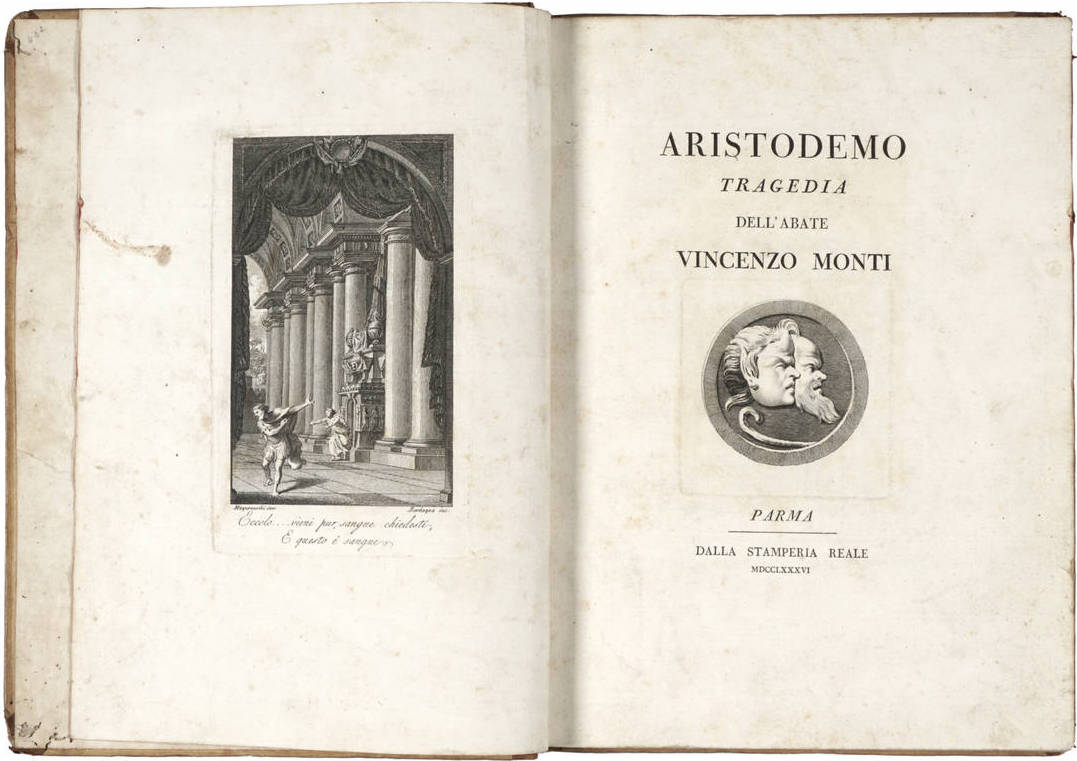
Frontispiece and title page of neoclassicist Vincenzo Monti's tragedy Aristodemo (Parma, 1786), a translation of which was included in Burney's Tragic Dramas

Frances Burney was a niece of the novelists Frances Burney and Sarah Burney, and granddaughter of the musicologist Charles Burney. One of eight children of musicians Esther "Hetty" Burney (1749–1832) and Charles Rousseau Burney (1747–1819), Burney became a governess at the age of 18, and worked in various such posts for the rest of her life. She spent periods in the households of Sir Thomas Plumer and Sir Henry Russell.

She is known to have published one work, which, no doubt due to her name, has often been wrongly attributed to her famous aunt: in 1818, she had privately printed Tragic dramas; chiefly intended for representation in private families: to which is added, Aristodemus, a tragedy, from the Italian of Vincenzo Monti. The two "tragic dramas" of the title are Fitzormond, or, Cherished Resentment and Malek Adhel, the Champion of the Crescent: both are three-act plays; both in verse; and each perhaps "overblown and melodramatic" for modern taste. The author of her ODNB entry speculates that Burney was affected by "the concerns of her grandfather Charles Burney (1726–1814) about the potential impropriety of the stage, particularly for female dramatists": anxieties about feminine reputation that prevented Burney's aunt and namesake, Frances Burney, from having her own plays performed when she was younger. Indeed, Burney's preface to Tragic dramas is largely concerned with defending the harmlessness of private, or "domestic drama." Charles Burney's strict views about the theatre were, arguably, even ahead of their time, as social attitudes had tightened by the time his granddaughter was writing (see Antitheatricality in the 18th century).

Burney appears not to have had a close relationship with her famous aunt, who claimed in a letter to Esther, "I once thought I had caught a bit of her heart—& I tried for it, 3 or 4 years ago—but I see, & am sorry to see, my mistake."

Frances Burney suffered attacks of jaundice throughout her life and died, in 1828, aged 52, in Bath.

== Plays ==
- Tragic dramas; chiefly intended for representation in private families: to which is added, Aristodemus, a tragedy, from the Italian of Vincenzo Monti. London: Printed for the author by Thomas Davison, 1818.

== Bibliography ==
- Mann, David. "Frances Burney (1776–1828)." Women playwrights in England, Ireland, and Scotland, 1660–1823. Bloomington: Indiana University Press, 1996, pp. 63–64. (Internet Archive)
- Plaskitt, Emma. "Burney, Frances (1776–1828)." Oxford Dictionary of National Biography. Retrieved 14 March 2011. Subscription required.
