= List of music plates in Rees's Cyclopaedia =

This article is a list of music plates in Rees's Cyclopaedia. They were written by Charles Burney (1726–1814), with additional material by John Farey, sr (1766–1826), and John Farey, Jr (1791–1851). There are 53 plates as well a numerous examples of music typeset.

== Music plates ==
Charles Burney was well known as the author of a General History of Music, 4 vol 1776–1789 and two travel diaries recording his Musical Tours collecting information in France and Italy, and later Germany, 1+2 vol, 1771 and 1773, as well as the Commemoration of Handel, 1785 and his Musical Memoirs of Metastasio, 1796. John Farey, sr was a polymath, well known today for his work as a geologist and for his investigations of the mathematics of sound, and the schemes of temperament used in tuning musical instruments then. His son, John Farey, jr, was also polymathic in his interests. He contributed numerous drawings for the illustrations of mostly technological and scientific topics in Rees's Cyclopaedia.

The index to plates in Vol 39 of the work notes that plates XXXIV — XLIV were intended to include selections from the works of Haydn and Mozart, and also various National Airs. Since they were readily accessible elsewhere they were omitted to save expense. Plate XLV was also omitted.

Wilson Lowry engraved a number of the general plates in Miscellany and with John Farey Jr, the draughtsman, those on the Hawkins's Claviole and the set on the Organ. The examples of music notation in the Music section must be presumed to have been originally written out by Burney, and were engraved by a Jno [John] Lee. All the plates of musical instruments were also engraved by Lee. A number were drawn by a T. Webster. One was drawn by Edward Francesco Burney, Charles Burney's nephew, and another by an artist named Strange.

== Vol III of plates Hydraulics — Naval Architecture ==
MISCELLANY

Publication date	Plate No	Figure No	Title	Link to digitised plate in the Internet Archive
1820	I	8 and 9	Chinese musical instruments, Ching and King	https://archive.org/stream/mobot31753002007406#page/n96/mode/1up
1809	IX	Whole plate	Dramatic Machinery	https://archive.org/stream/mobot31753002007406#page/n105/mode/1up
1810	X	Whole plate	Dramatic Machinery	https://archive.org/stream/mobot31753002007406#page/n106/mode/1up
1816	XIV	Whole plate	Hawkins's Claviole or Finger Keyed Viol	https://archive.org/stream/mobot31753002007406#page/n112/mode/1up
1819	XXV	1, 2, 4	Aeolus's Harp; Crowth; Marine Trumpet	https://archive.org/stream/mobot31753002007406#page/n123/mode/1up

MUSIC

Publication date	Plate No	Figure No	Title	Link to digitised plate in the Internet Archive
December 1, 1806	I*	Whole plate	Modern time-table	https://archive.org/stream/mobot31753002007406#page/n135/mode/1up
December 1, 1808	II*	Whole plate	Musical characters	https://archive.org/stream/mobot31753002007406#page/n136/mode/1up
January 1, 1803	I	Whole plate	Arpeggio; Ancient Musical Characters; [Keyboard layout]	https://archive.org/stream/mobot31753002007406#page/n137/mode/1up
November 1, 1804	II	Whole plate	Thorough base or accompaniment	https://archive.org/stream/mobot31753002007406#page/n138/mode/1up
December 1, 1804	III	Whole plate	Thorough base	https://archive.org/stream/mobot31753002007406#page/n139/mode/1up
November 1, 1804	IV	Whole plate	Thorough base; Dissallowances in thorough base	https://archive.org/stream/mobot31753002007406#page/n140/mode/1up
November 1, 1804	V	Whole plate	Thorough base	https://archive.org/stream/mobot31753002007406#page/n141/mode/1up
June 1, 1805	VI	Whole plate	Counterpoint	https://archive.org/stream/mobot31753002007406#page/n142/mode/1up
September 1, 1805	VII	Whole plate	Counterpoint	https://archive.org/stream/mobot31753002007406#page/n143/mode/1up
May 1, 1806	VIII	Whole plate	Counterpoint	https://archive.org/stream/mobot31753002007406#page/n144/mode/1up
May 1, 1806	IX	Whole plate	Music. Answers to the regular Fugues ...	https://archive.org/stream/mobot31753002007406#page/n145/mode/1up
June 2, 1806	X	Whole plate	Music. Introduction to the manner of ...	https://archive.org/stream/mobot31753002007406#page/n146/mode/1up
June 2, 1806	XI	Whole plate	Counterpoint	https://archive.org/stream/mobot31753002007406#page/n147/mode/1up
July 1, 1806	XII	Whole plate	Counterpoint	https://archive.org/stream/mobot31753002007406#page/n148/mode/1up
1806	XIII	Whole plate	Counterpoint	https://archive.org/stream/mobot31753002007406#page/n149/mode/1up
1806	XIV	Whole plate	Counterpoint	https://archive.org/stream/mobot31753002007406#page/n150/mode/1up
February 12, 1813	XV	Whole plate	Counterpoint	https://archive.org/stream/mobot31753002007406#page/n151/mode/1up
February 12, 1813	XVI	Whole plate	Counterpoint	https://archive.org/stream/mobot31753002007406#page/XVI/mode/1up
No date	XVII	Whole plate	Double counterpoint in the octave	https://archive.org/stream/mobot31753002007406#page/XVII/mode/1up
July 1, 1806	XVIII	Whole plate	Contrappunto doppio in genere Cromatico	https://archive.org/stream/mobot31753002007406#page/XVIII/mode/1up
April 11, 1808	XIX	Whole plate	Contrappunto doppio in genere Cromatico (cont.)	https://archive.org/stream/mobot31753002007406#page/XIX/mode/1up
July 1, 1806	XX	Whole plate	Contrappunto doppio in genere Cromatico (cont.)	https://archive.org/stream/mobot31753002007406#page/XX/mode/1up
April 11, 1808	XXI	Whole plate	Modulation	https://archive.org/stream/mobot31753002007406#page/XXI/mode/1up
April 11, 1808	XXII	Whole plate	Music. Modulation from a given note ...	https://archive.org/stream/mobot31753002007406#page/XXII/mode/1up
July 1, 1806	XXIII	Whole plate	Music. Rousseau ...; Kirnberger ...	https://archive.org/stream/mobot31753002007406#page/XXIII/mode/1up
April 11, 1808	XXIV	Whole plate	Music. Product of the chord ...[etc.]	https://archive.org/stream/mobot31753002007406#page/XXIV/mode/1up
April 11, 1808	XXV and XXVI. On one plate numbered XXV	Whole plate	Music. Example of the Pathetic Genus ...[etc.]	https://archive.org/stream/mobot31753002007406#page/XXV/mode/1up
November 3, 1818	XXVII	Whole plate	Music. Fingering on keyed instruments	https://archive.org/stream/mobot31753002007406#page/XXVII/mode/1up
November 5, 1818	XXVIII	Whole plate	Music. Iteration in Fingering	https://archive.org/stream/mobot31753002007406#page/XXVIII/mode/1up
November 5, 1818	XXIX	Whole plate	Music. Fingering of semitonic or chromatic divisions	https://archive.org/stream/mobot31753002007406#page/XXIX/mode/1up
November 5, 1818	XXX	Whole plate	Music. Shakes	https://archive.org/stream/mobot31753002007406#page/XXX/mode/1up
February 2, 1807	XXXI and XXXII. On one plate numbered XXXII	Whole plate	Music. Scale of the bassoon	https://archive.org/stream/mobot31753002007406#page/XXX/mode/1up
March 2, 1807	XXXIII	Whole plate	Facsimile of an Air on three notes by Rousseau	https://archive.org/stream/mobot31753002007406#page/XXXIII/mode/1up
—	[XXXIV — XLIV]	—	Plates omitted from the work to save expense. (see Introduction)	
Date cropped	XLV	Whole plate	Music. Original melodies to the tune of Ossian in Temora	https://archive.org/stream/mobot31753002007406#page/XXXIV/mode/1up
—	[XLVI]	—	Plate omitted from the work	
April 11, 1808	[XLVII]	Whole plate	Euclidis sectio canonis	https://archive.org/stream/mobot31753002007406#page/n169/mode/1up
April 11, 1808	XLVIII	Whole plate	Music. Canon in ogni modo: ... [etc.]	https://archive.org/stream/mobot31753002007406#page/XLVIII/mode/1up

MUSICAL INSTRUMENTS

Publication date	Plate No	Figure No	Title	Link to digitised plate in the Internet Archive
January 1, 1803	I	Whole plate	Ancient musical instruments	https://archive.org/stream/mobot31753002007406#page/n171/mode/1up
June 1, 1803	II	Whole plate	Ancient musical instruments & Masks	https://archive.org/stream/mobot31753002007406#page/n172/mode/1up
May 1, 1804	III	Whole plate	Ancient musical instruments	https://archive.org/stream/mobot31753002007406#page/n173/mode/1up
Date cropped	IV	Whole plate	Ancient musical instruments	https://archive.org/stream/mobot31753002007406#page/n174/mode/1up
September 2, 1805	V	Whole plate	Instruments of music:Indian musical instruments	https://archive.org/stream/mobot31753002007406#page/V/mode/1up
December 1, 1806	VI	Whole plate	Instruments of music: Pandean minstrels, in performance at Vaux-Hall	https://archive.org/stream/mobot31753002007406#page/n176/mode/1up
April 11, 1808	VII	Whole plate	Musical instruments: Welsh harps	https://archive.org/stream/mobot31753002007406#page/n177/mode/1up
April 11, 1808	VIII	Whole plate	Musical instruments: Origin of the bow	https://archive.org/stream/mobot31753002007406#page/n178/mode/1up
April 11, 1808	IX	Whole plate	Russian musical instruments	https://archive.org/stream/mobot31753002007406#page/n179/mode/1up
Aug 1, 1808	X	Whole plate	Musical instruments: Harps	https://archive.org/stream/mobot31753002007406#page/n180/mode/1up
October 11, 1811	XI	Whole plate	Musical instruments: Flutes, Hautboys [etc.]	https://archive.org/stream/mobot31753002007406#page/n181/mode/1up
November 1, 1811	XII	Whole plate	Musical instruments: Horns, Serpent [etc.]	https://archive.org/stream/mobot31753002007406#page/n182/mode/1up
December 1, 1811	XIII	Whole plate	Musical instruments: Arch-lute [Theobro], Mandolines	https://archive.org/stream/mobot31753002007406#page/n183/mode/1up
January 1, 1813	XIV	Whole plate	Musical instruments: Violin, Cello, Kit, Viol da Gamba	https://archive.org/stream/mobot31753002007406#page/XIV/mode/1up
December 21, 1811	XV	Whole plate	Musical instruments:Viol d'Amour. Mandore, Spanish Guitar, Lute	https://archive.org/stream/mobot31753002007406#page/XV/mode/1up

== Vol IV of plates. Navigation — Writing by cipher ==
ORGAN

Publication date	Plate No	Figure No	Title	Link to digitised plate in the Internet Archive
1814	I	Whole plate	Organ	https://archive.org/stream/cyclopaediaplates04rees#page/n54/mode/1up
1814	II	Whole plate	Organ: Interior Profile of an English Church Organ	https://archive.org/stream/cyclopaediaplates04rees#page/n56/mode/1up
1814	III	Whole plate	Organ: Made by Messrs Flight and Robson for the Earl of Kirkwall	https://archive.org/stream/cyclopaediaplates04rees#page/n58/mode/1up
1817	IV	Whole plate	Organ: [Detail of the Flight and Robson organ]	https://archive.org/stream/cyclopaediaplates04rees#page/n60/mode/1up
