= Caroline Burney =

Unidentified 19th-century English novelist

Caroline Burney was the pseudonym of the author of two early 19th-century three-volume novels published in London: Seraphina (1809) and Lindamira (1810). The real identity of the author has not been discovered.

== Genre ==
The novels belong to a genre which had become known in the late 18th century as "modern novels", distinguished by their treatment of sensibility, manners and sentiment, in contrast to the "romances", which were seen as "characteristically extravagant and improbable".

== Disclaimer ==
The novels appeared in London at a time when Frances Burney, and to some extent her younger sister Sarah Burney, enjoyed fame as novelists. Seraphina was advertised by its publisher, J. F. Hughes, on 6 and 14 June 1809 in the Star and 23 June and 5 July 1809 in the Morning Chronicle as "Miss Burney's New Novel". Frances Burney (Mme. D'Arblay) was exiled in France at the time and probably unaware of the novels, but their publication under that name was resented at least by Sarah Burney's publisher, Henry Colburn. The following note appeared facing page 1 of the first edition of Sarah Burney's Traits of Nature: "ADVERTISEMENT. The Publisher of this Work thinks it proper to state that MISS BURNEY is not the Author of a Novel called 'Seraphina', published in the Year 1809, under the Name of CAROLINE BURNEY."

Sarah refers disparagingly to Seraphina in a letter to her niece Charlotte Barrett, dated 4 October 1811: "I am scandalized at Sal's fal-lal taste in the literary way.... She ought by this time to like... something in short besides Sir Henry, and Seraphina, & a parcel of stuff only good to put money in the writer's pocket."
