= James Andrews (botanical artist) =

British botanical illustrator

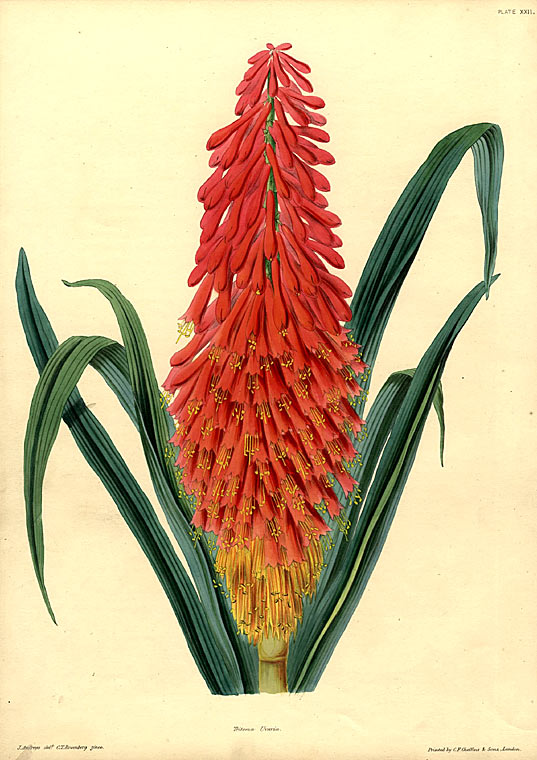
Kniphofia uvaria L. The Illustrated Bouquet

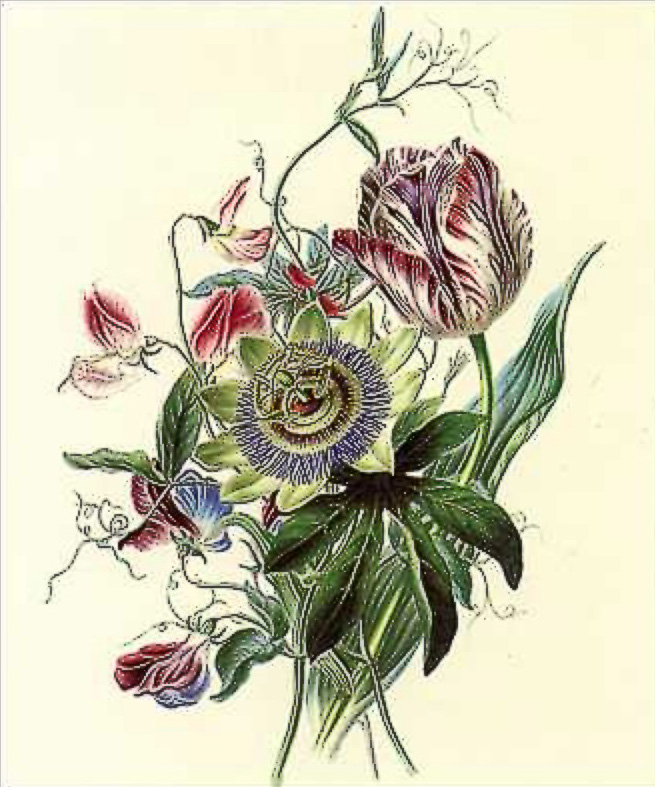
Flora's Gems

James Andrews (1801–1876) was an English draughtsman, botanical painter and illustrator noted for his accomplished illustrations. He also taught flower-painting to young ladies. He created the illustrations for the famous nature writer Sarah Bowdich Lee's 1854 book Trees, Plants, and Flowers: Their Beauties, Uses, and Influences.

In March 1857, his painting of fruit and a bowl in watercolour received a medal from the Royal Society of Agriculture and Botany in Ghent.

In 1868, Andrews exhibited a piece called Earnest Andrews, a painting of fruit and flowers, at the Royal Academy of Art annual summer exhibition.

== Publications ==
- Flora's Gems with Louisa Anne Twamley
- Floral Tableaux Folio, 14 3/4 in × 10 3/4 in (370 mm × 270 mm). David Bogue. 1847. Printed by C. Graf.
- Ornamental Foliated Plants, London: [E.G. Henderson & Son, 1857-1859]. Zincographs by C.T. Rosenberg, coloured by hand, printed by C.F. Cheffins & Sons.
- The Illustrated Bouquet, London 1857-64. Three volumes, folio, 14 3/4 in × 10 3/4 in (370 mm × 270 mm). 84 hand-coloured engravings by James Andrews and C.T. Rosenberg, after the art work of Miss Sowerby, Mrs Withers, and James Edwards. Published by Edward George Henderson and Andrew Henderson.
- 1835 - Andrew’s Lessons in Painting Flowers – 6 books, A series of Easy and Progressive studies. Written and drawn by James Andrews, Publisher Charles Tilt, Fleet Street: John Menzies, Edinburgh; Thomas Wardle, Philadelphia . One copy is held at the Royal Horticulture Society, Vincent Square, London. Another copy is held at Edinburgh University, UK
- 1842 –The Sentiment of Flowers, this work can be found at the Herbarium Library Kew Gardens, England.
- 1847- 48 Choice Garden Flowers and Wild Flowers of England This work can be found at the Herbarium Library Kew Gardens. This is work is with Rev Robert Tyas MA FRBS; Publisher Houlston and Wright, 65 Paternoster Row, MDCCLIX
- 1848 Favourite Field Flowers and Wild Flowers of England This work can be found at the Herbarium Library Kew Gardens, England Publisher Houlston and Stoneman, 65 Paternoster Row,
- 1851 Flowers and Heraldry; or, floral emblems and heraldic figures combined to express pure sentiment, kind feelings and excellent principles, in a manner at one simple, elegant and beautiful ….. with twenty-four emblazoned plates and drawings and coloured by James Andrews F.R.H.S. The author is Robert Tyas, (not recorded as Rev Robert Tyas), Publisher Houlston and Stoneman, London . This work can be found at the British Library London
- 1857- 1861 Florist, Fruitist and Garden Miscellany – 5 volumes This work can be found at Herbarium Library Kew Gardens, England. Publisher “ Florist “ Office, 28 HenriettaStreet, Covent Garden, London.
- 1859 Wild Flowers of England series 1+2 in one publication This work can be found at Herbarium Library Kew Gardens. Publisher Houlston and Wright; 65 Paternoster Row, London
- 1862-71 The Floral Magazine volumes 2 – 8. This work can be found at the Herbarium Library Kew Gardens, England There are more than 400 plates of Andrews paintings in the 7 volumes. The Rev Henry Honywood Dombrain was the author of the Floral Magazine. Andrews did not contribute to volume 1.
- 1961 Flower portraits. Eva Mannering, publisher The Ariel Press London, this work is at the Herbarium Library at Kew Gardens, England and describes Andrews contribution to botanical art.
- 2011 Floral Paintings. Publisher Papadakis Publisher a copy is at the Herbarium Library at Kew Gardens England, it is a selection of Andrews work from the Floral Magazine.

== Gallery ==
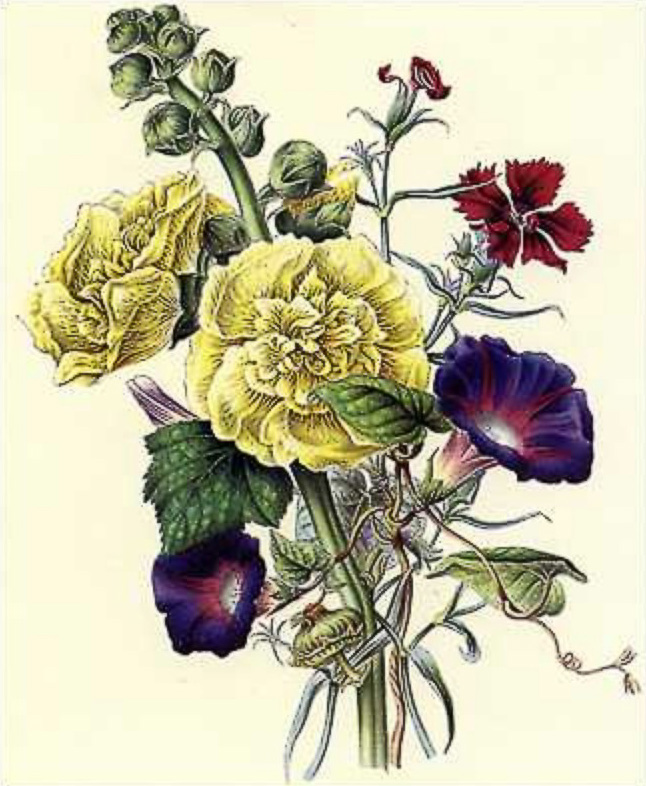
