= Sarah Bowdich Lee =

English writer, illustrator and scientist (1791-1856)

Sarah Eglonton Bowdich Lee (née Wallis; 10 September 1791 – 22 September 1856) was an English writer, illustrator, traveller, zoologist, botanist, and pteridologist.

== Biography ==
Sarah Eglonton Wallis was born on 10 September 1791, the only daughter of John Eglinton Wallis of Colchester.

In 1813, she married the naturalist Thomas Edward Bowdich, whose interests in nature, travel, and adventure she shared.

In 1819, they went to Paris to visit Baron Cuvier; Thomas had previously visited him in 1818 with a letter of introduction obtained from Dr. William Elford Leach of the British Museum. They spent most of the next four years in Paris studying his collections.

In 1823, on their final trip to Africa, they visited Madeira on their way, but her husband died on the Gambia River on 10 January 1824.

Left with three children, she struggled to support her family as an author. Early in her widowhood, Mrs Bowdich often visited Baron Cuvier in Paris, where he treated her almost like a daughter; upon his death in 1832, she wrote a memoir of his life.

In 1826, she married Robert Lee and in subsequent years published under the name Mrs. Robert Lee.

In 1854, she was granted a civil list pension of £50 per year. In 1856, she died at Erith while visiting her daughter Eugenia.

Of her numerous works, perhaps the four most important are Taxidermy (1820) an exhaustive treatment which came to a sixth edition in 1843; Excursions in Madeira and Porto Santo (1825), a work of natural history; The Fresh-Water Fishes of Great Britain (1825), illustrated by the author; and Memoirs of Baron Cuvier (1833).

== Selected publications ==
- 1833 Memoirs of Baron Cuvier. Cambridge Library Collection - Zoology. Cambridge University Press; 2014:i-viii.
- 1844. Elements of Natural History, for the use of schools and young persons: comprising the principles of classification, interspersed with ... account of the most remarkable animals ... Illustrated
- 1847. The African Wanderers, or The Adventures of Carlos and Antonio
- 1850. Elements of Natural History, for the use of schools and young persons: comprising the principles of classification, interspersed with ... account of the most remarkable animals ... Illustrated
- 1851. Adventures in Australia: or, the Wanderings of Captain Spencer in the bush and the wilds ... With illustrations by J.S. Prout. xi, [1], 364 pp., 18 pl.
- 1852a. British Birds, with descriptions by Mrs. R. Lee ... and seven pictures from drawings by Harrison Weir
- 1852b. The Farm and its Scenes, with descriptions by Mrs. R. Lee ... and six pictures from drawings by Harrison Weir
- 1853a. Foreign Animals, with descriptions by Mrs. R. Lee ... and seven pictures from drawings by Harrison Weir
- 1853b. Anecdotes of the Habits and Instincts of Birds, Reptiles, and Fishes ... With illustrations by Harrison Weir
- 1853c. Familiar Natural History, with descriptions by Mrs. R. Lee ... and ... illustrations from drawings by Harrison Weir
- 1854. Trees, Plants, and Flowers: their beauties, uses, and influences ... The illustrations ... by James Andrews
- Foreign Birds, with descriptions by Mrs. R. Lee ... and seven pictures from drawings by Harrison Weir
- Taxidermy: or, the art of collecting, preparing, and mounting objects of natural history
- British Animals, with descriptions by Mrs. R. Lee ... and seven pictures from drawings by Harrison Weir

== Taxon described by her ==
- See Category:Taxa named by Sarah Bowdich Lee

== External Sources ==
- Works by or about Sarah Bowdich Lee at the Internet Archive
- "LEE, MRS". Gentleman's Magazine. 201: 653–654. July–December 1856.
- Memoirs of Baron Cuvier by Mrs. R. Lee, 1833, (London: Longman)
- Works by Sarah Bowdich Lee at LibriVox (public domain audiobooks)
- Ogilvie, M. B.; Harvey, J. D., eds. (2000), Biographical Dictionary of Women in Science, L-Z, New York: Routledge, p. 764, ISBN 0-415-92040-X
- Desmond, R. 1994. Dictionary of British & Irish Botanists & Horticulturists including Plant Collectors, Flower Painters & Garden Designers. Taylor & Francis & The Natural History Museum, London.
