= Esther Sleepe =

English fan-maker (1725–1762)

- Born: 1725
- Died: 1762 (aged 36–37)
- Spouse: Charles Burney (1749-1762, her death)
- Children: 6, including: James; Frances; Susanna Elizabeth; Charles
- Parents: Richard Sleepe (father); Esther Dubois (mother)

Esther Sleepe (1725–1762) was an English fan-maker.

== Family ==
She was born to Richard Sleepe, Head of the City Waits (d.1758) and the fan maker Esther Dubois (1693–1773), and the sister of Mary Sleepe Samson and Martha Sleepe.

In 1749 she married the musician Charles Burney and had six children, including James Burney, Charles Burney, Susanna Elizabeth Burney and Fanny Burney.

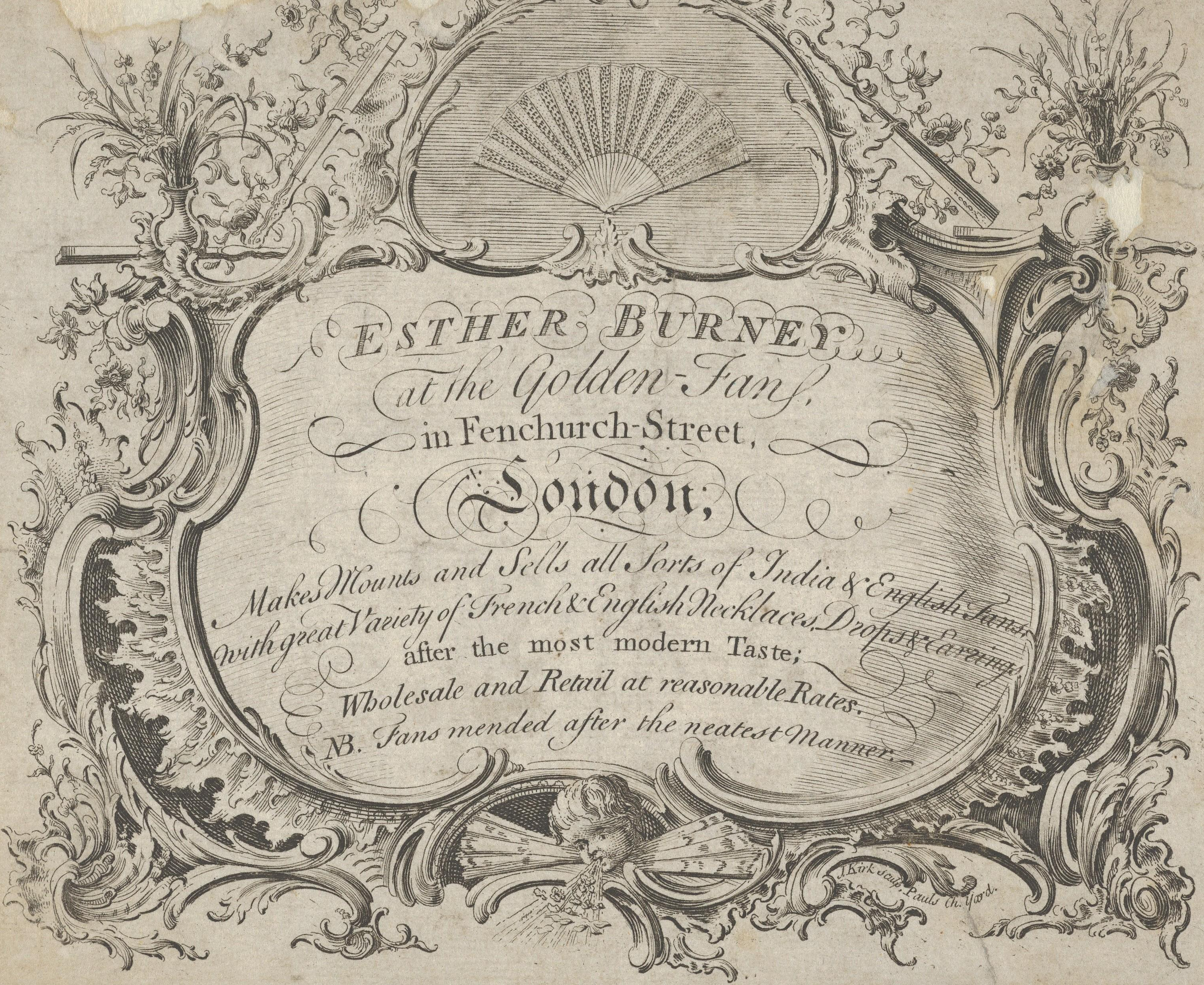
Trade card for Esther Burney's fan shop

== Business ==
From 1747, the Sleepe sisters managed their own workshop on Poultry, London, under the sign of the Golden Fan and Seven Stars, where they manufactured and sold fans and other luxury items. They were very successful. After her marriage, Esther Sleepe was the one supporting her family financially, since the profession of her spouse was poorly paid, but this fact was hidden after her generation, since the Burney family had an ambition to be seen as upper class, where it was not seen as proper for a lady to be professionally active.

One of her business cards is preserved in the British Museum:

Esther Sleepe ... Makes Mounts and Sells all Sorts of India & English Fans with great Variety of French & English Necklaces, Drops & Earrings after the most modern Taste. Wholesale and Retail at reasonable Rates. NB. Fans mended after the neatest Manner.

She was one of the successful London businesswomen portrayed in the exhibition 'City Women in the Eighteenth Century', held outdoors on Cheapside in 2019.
