= Harrison Weir =

British artist (1824–1906)

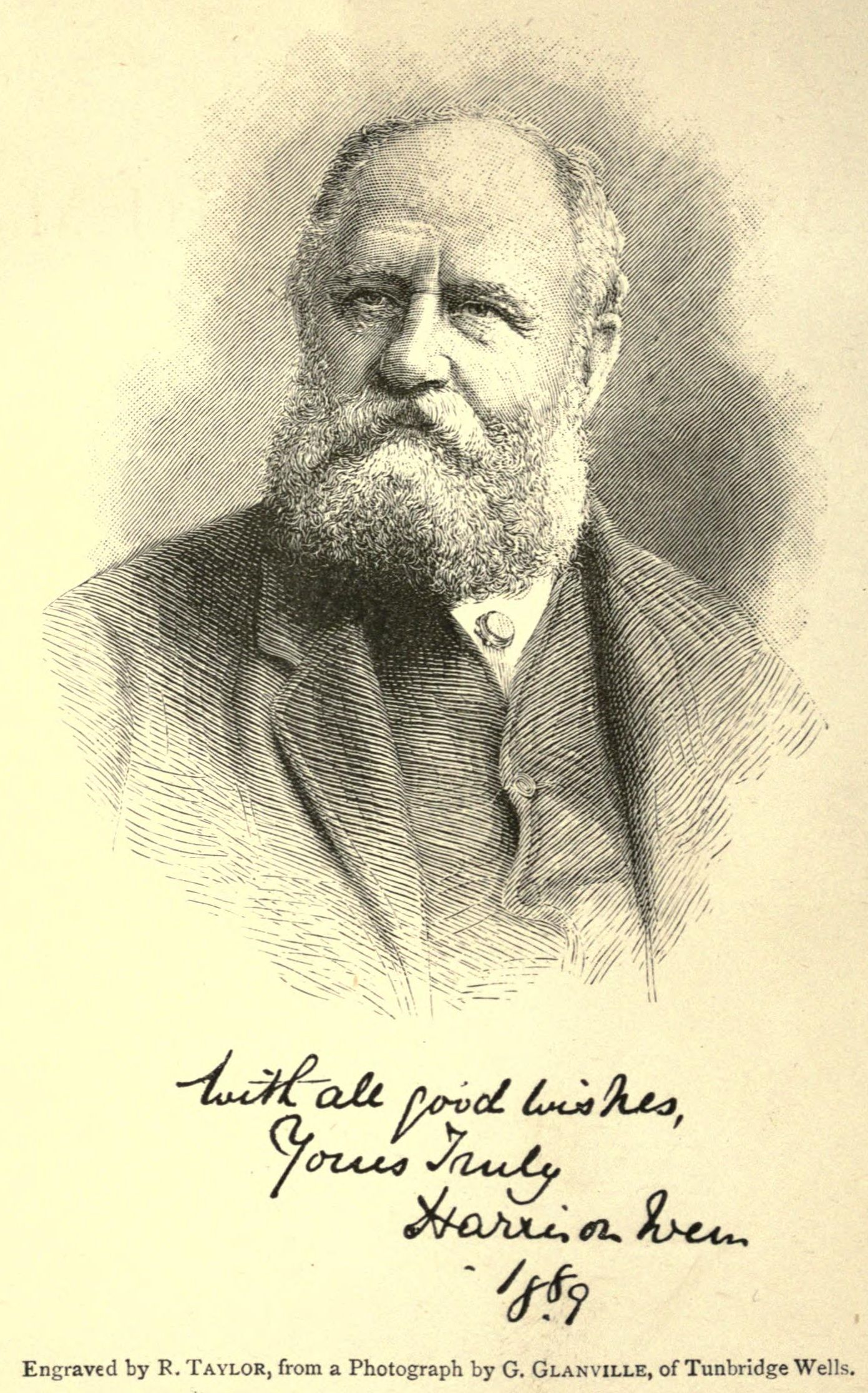
Harrison Weir

Harrison William Weir RI (5 May 1824 – 3 January 1906), known as "The Father of the Cat Fancy", was a British artist.

He organised the first cat show in England, at the Crystal Palace, London, in July 1871. He and his brother, John Jenner Weir, both served as judges in the show. In 1887 Harrison Weir founded the National Cat Club and was its first President and Show Manager until his resignation in 1890.

== History ==
Weir was born at Lewes, Sussex, on 5 May 1824. In 1866 Weir started working on his Victorian gothic home "Weirleigh", in the village of Matfield, Kent. Weirleigh was later bought by the Sassoon family and was the birthplace of Siegfried Sassoon in 1886. The house still stands today. After selling Weirleigh, Weir lived at Poplar Hall, Appledore, Kent, where he died on 3 January 1906.

== Career ==
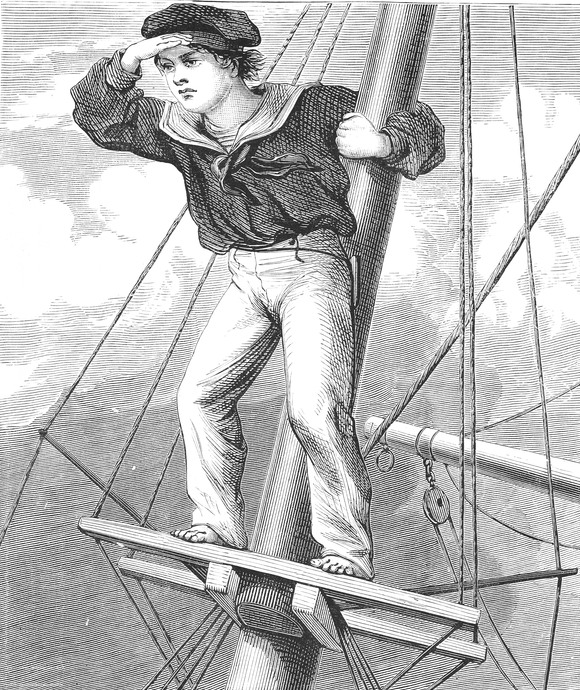
"Lookout Boy Aloft"(?) from Pictures and Prattle for the Nursery (1880?)

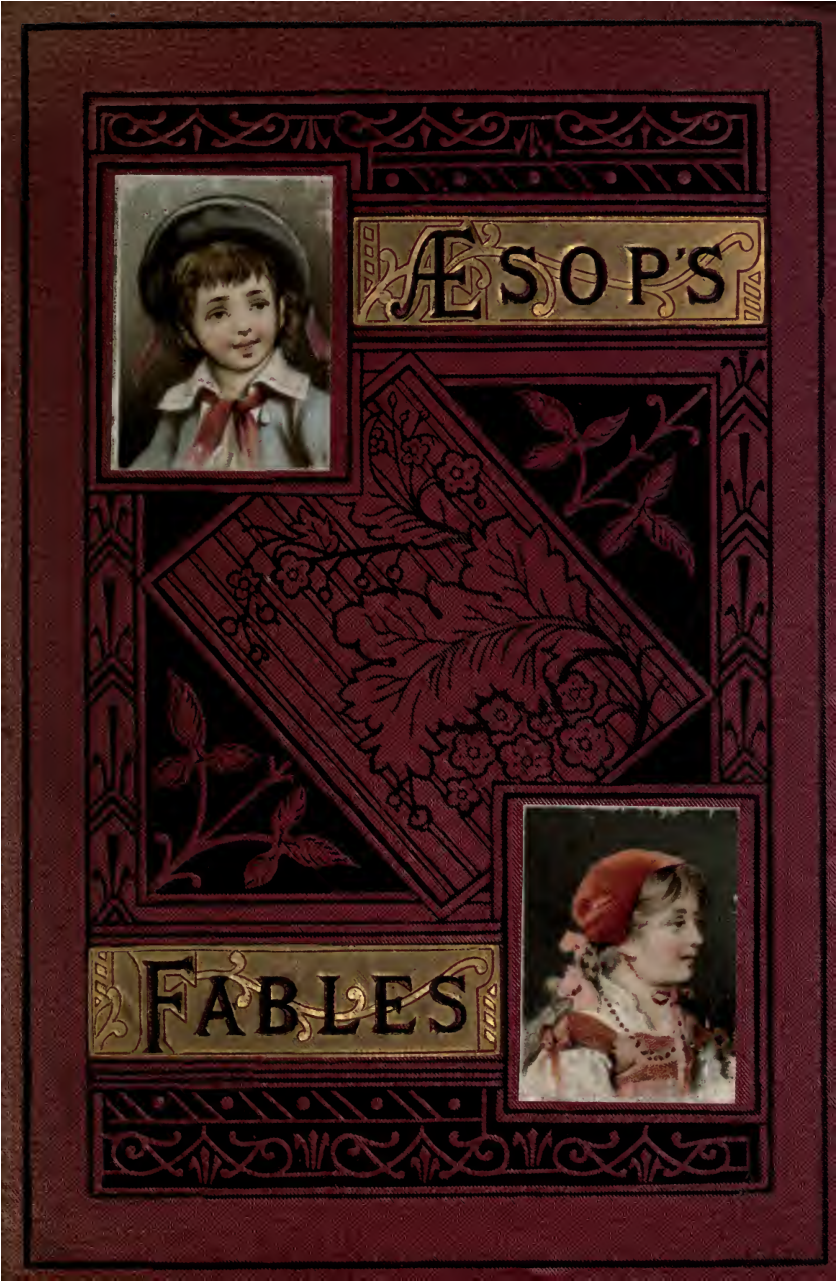
Illustrated cover of Three Hundred Aesop's Fables by George Fyler Townsend (c. 1867)

Weir was educated at Albany Academy, Camberwell, until 1837 when he became apprenticed to George Baxter, the colour-printer. Weir worked in every branch of Baxter's business, his main work being printing off the plates. From Baxter he learned to engrave and draw on wood and taught himself during his spare time to draw birds, mammals, and other subjects from nature. in 1842 Herbert Ingram founded The Illustrated London News and employed Weir as a draughtsman on wood and engraver from the first issue and for many years thereafter.

In 1845 Weir made a first exhibition consisting of an oil painting of a wild duck, "The Dead Shot", at the British Institution. During his career he was an occasional exhibitor at the Royal Academy, the Suffolk Street, and other galleries. On his election in 1849 as member of the New Society of Painters in Water-colours—now the Royal Institute of Painters in Water Colours—he exhibited mainly there, altogether 100 pictures.

Weir was a natural history artist and provided some of the illustrations for the Rev John George Wood's Illustrated Natural History (1853), served as chief illustrator for Charles St John's Wild Sports and Natural History of the Highlands, and designed all of the illustrations for George Fyler Townsend's Three Hundred Æsop's Fables (1867). He also provided illustrations for many of the books of the natural history author Sarah Bowdich Lee. Weir was enormously prolific and popular as a book illustrator and worked not just for The Illustrated London News, but for many illustrated papers, including the Pictorial Times, The Field and Pictorial World. In some cases, such as The Poetry of Nature (1867), he compiled the books he illustrated. He was both author and illustrator of Every Day in the Country (1883) and Animal Studies, Old and New (1885). In literary society, Weir's close friends included Douglas Jerrold, Henry Mayhew, Albert Smith, and Tom Hood the younger, and Weir knew Thackeray and other eminent literary men.

In 1889, Weir wrote Our Cats and All About Them describing and illustrating the pedigree varieties of the time. This was the first pedigree cat book. The final third of Weir's book is various explanations and commentary on a multitude of feline-related topics, ranging from cat-derived proverbs, to feline Shakespearean theatre to Belgian cat-racing.

Weir was a keen animal fancier and his illustrations of domestic cats, dogs and poultry are probably best known. He was an experienced breeder of cats, carrier pigeons, and poultry and for thirty years often acted as a judge at the principal pigeon and poultry shows. He wrote and illustrated the exhaustive book Our Poultry and All About Them (1903), and much earlier in 1867 illustrated William Bernhard Tegetmeier's The Poultry Book.

Weir also had interest and experience in gardening and the cultivation of fruit trees and for many years contributed letters, articles, and illustrations to various gardening periodicals. Messrs. Garrard & Co. engaged him to design trophy cups for Ascot, Goodwood, and other annual horse races. In 1891 Weir was granted a civil list pension of £100 per year.

== Interests and activities ==
As a show judge, Weir was especially interested in cats, poultry, and pigeons, and these animals, along with dogs and rabbits, seem to be favourites in his art. In addition to gardening, fruit growing, field naturalist studies, and poultry breeding, Weir belonged to many clubs: the Savage, Whitefriars, Constitutional, Horticultural, Wigwam, Hamburgh, etc.

== Family ==
Harrison Weir was married three times: first, in 1845 to Ann, older daughter of John Frederick Herring, Sr., the famous painter of racehorses; second, to Alice, youngest daughter of T. Upjohn, M.R.C.S., of Norfolk; and third, upon Alice's death in 1898, in 1899 to Eva, daughter of George Gobell of Worthing, Sussex. Eva became his widow. Weir had two sons, Arthur Herring Weir (1847–1902) and John Gilbert Weir, and two daughters.

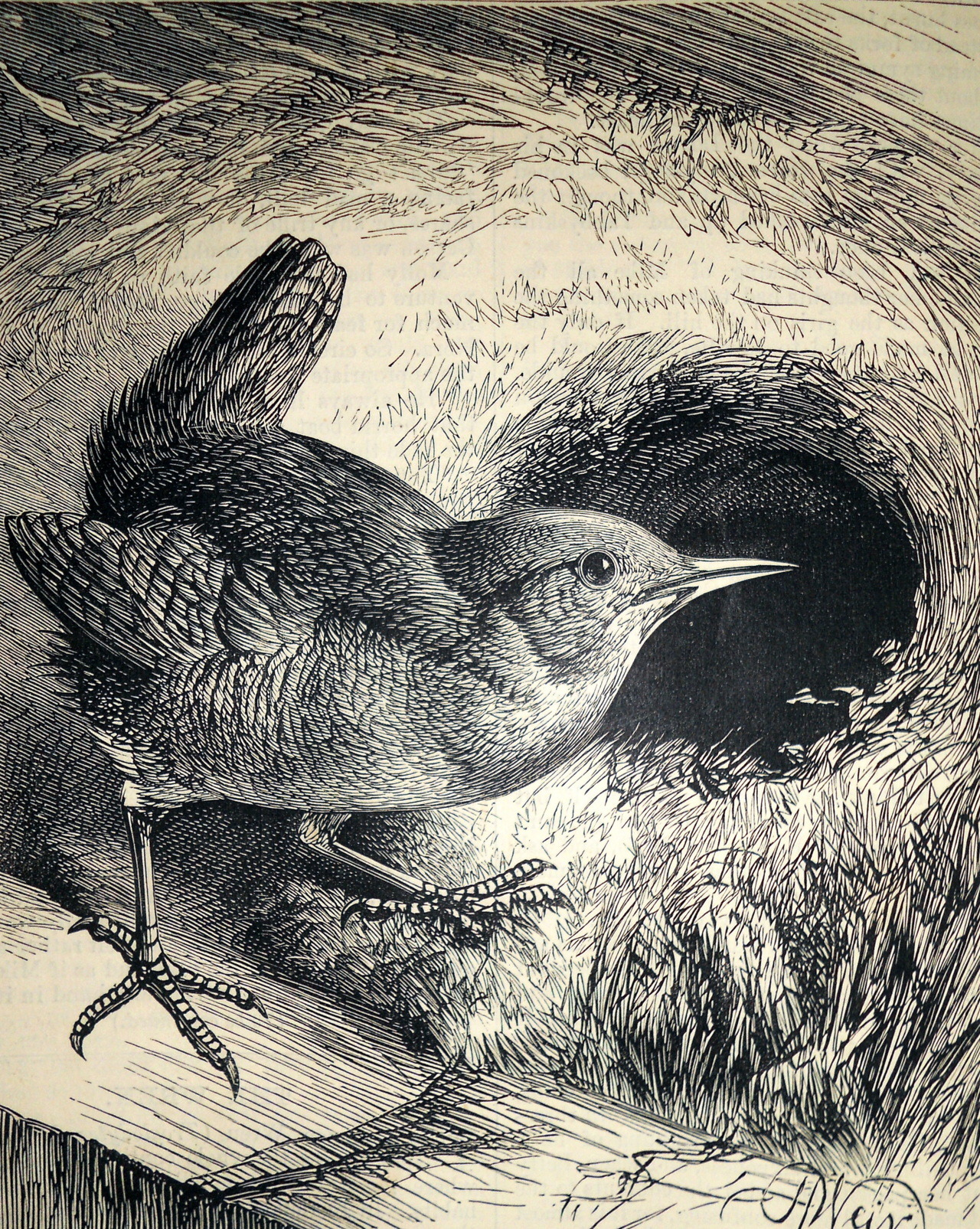
The Wren's Nest (1881)

== Selected works ==
As writer or editor, and illustrator:

- Every Day in the Country (1883) – diary
- Our Cats and All About Them: Their Varieties, Habits, and Management; and for Show, the Standard of Excellence and Beauty, Described and Pictured (1889)
- The Poultry Book (1912), by "many expert American breeders" and Weir, eds. Willis Grant Johnson and George O. Brown

As illustrator only:

- Cat and Dog, or Memoirs of Puss and the Captain, Julia Maitland (Grant and Griffiths, 1854), OCLC 46804435
- The Poetry of Nature (1868) – poems selected by Weir
