= Charles Burney (schoolmaster) =

English writer and scholar (1757–1817)

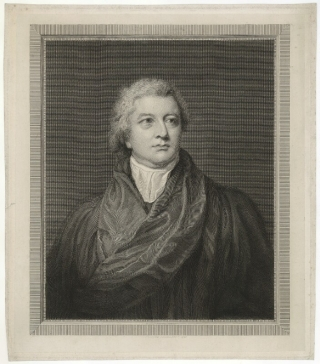
- Portrait of Charles Burney, 1821
- Born: 4 December 1757; King's Lynn, England
- Died: 28 December 1817 (aged 60); London, England
- Occupations: Writer; scholar

Charles Burney FRS (4 December 1757 – 28 December 1817) was an English writer and scholar. He was best known for his works on Greek literature. He was well-known for his Appendix to the Graeco-Latin lexicon (1789) and Remarks on the Greek Verses of Milton (1790). He was also a schoolmaster, clergyman, and chaplain to King George III. He kept a school for boys in Hammersmith and later Greenwich.

== Early life and education ==
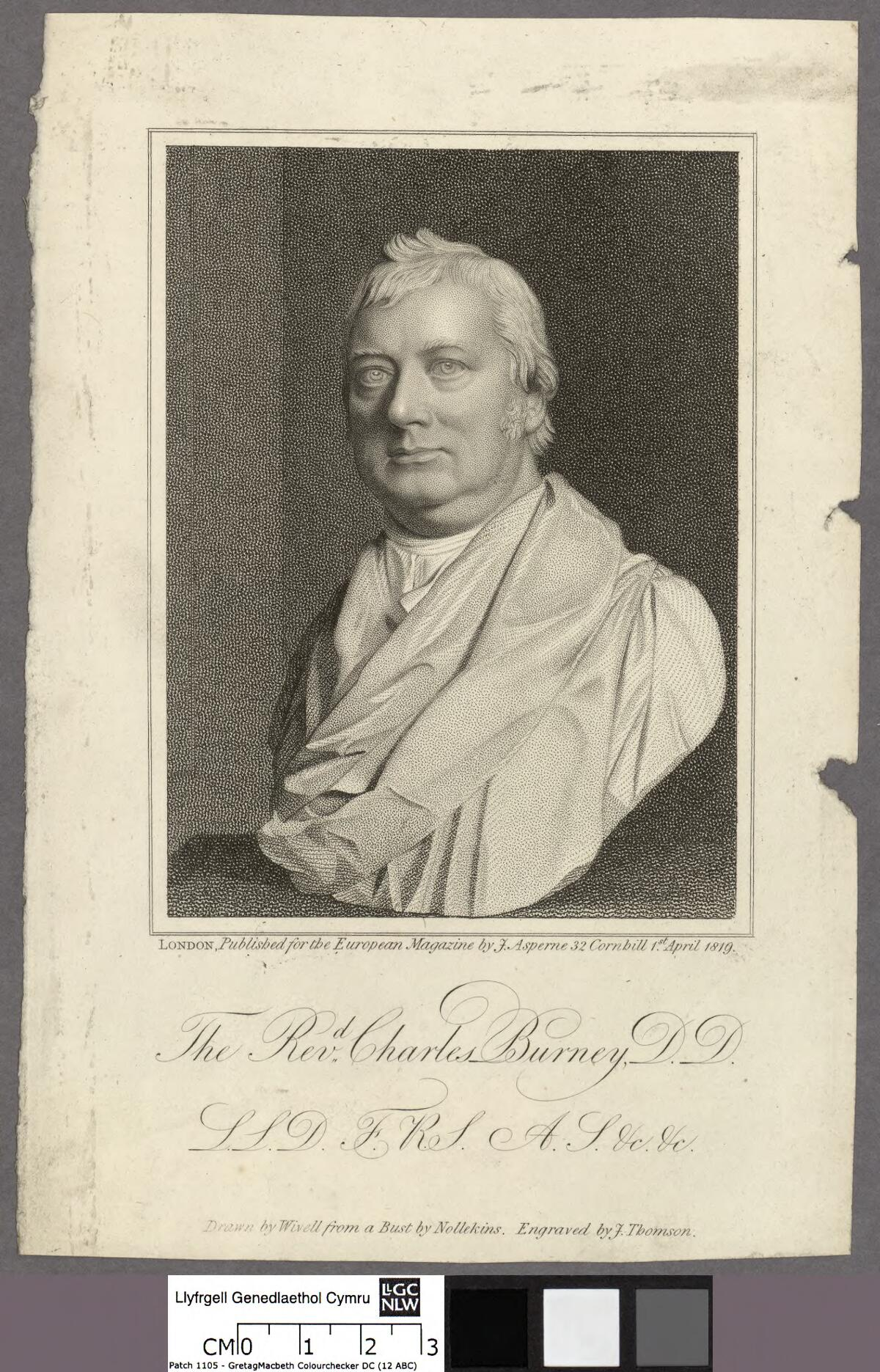
Portrait of Charles Burney Jr. Bust

A native of London, he was the son of Charles Burney, a music historian, and his first wife, Esther Sleepe. He was a brother of the novelist and diarist Fanny Burney and the explorer James Burney, and a half-brother of the novelist Sarah Burney.

Burney was educated at Charterhouse School, London and at Gonville and Caius College, University of Cambridge. He was accused of stealing books from the university library to pay debts and sent down in 1778. He obtained an LLD degree from King's College, Aberdeen in 1781. Burney collected 13,000 rare books and manuscripts, which he sold to the British Museum in 1817 for £13,500. This Burney Collection is housed in the British Library.

== Usher, scholar and parson ==
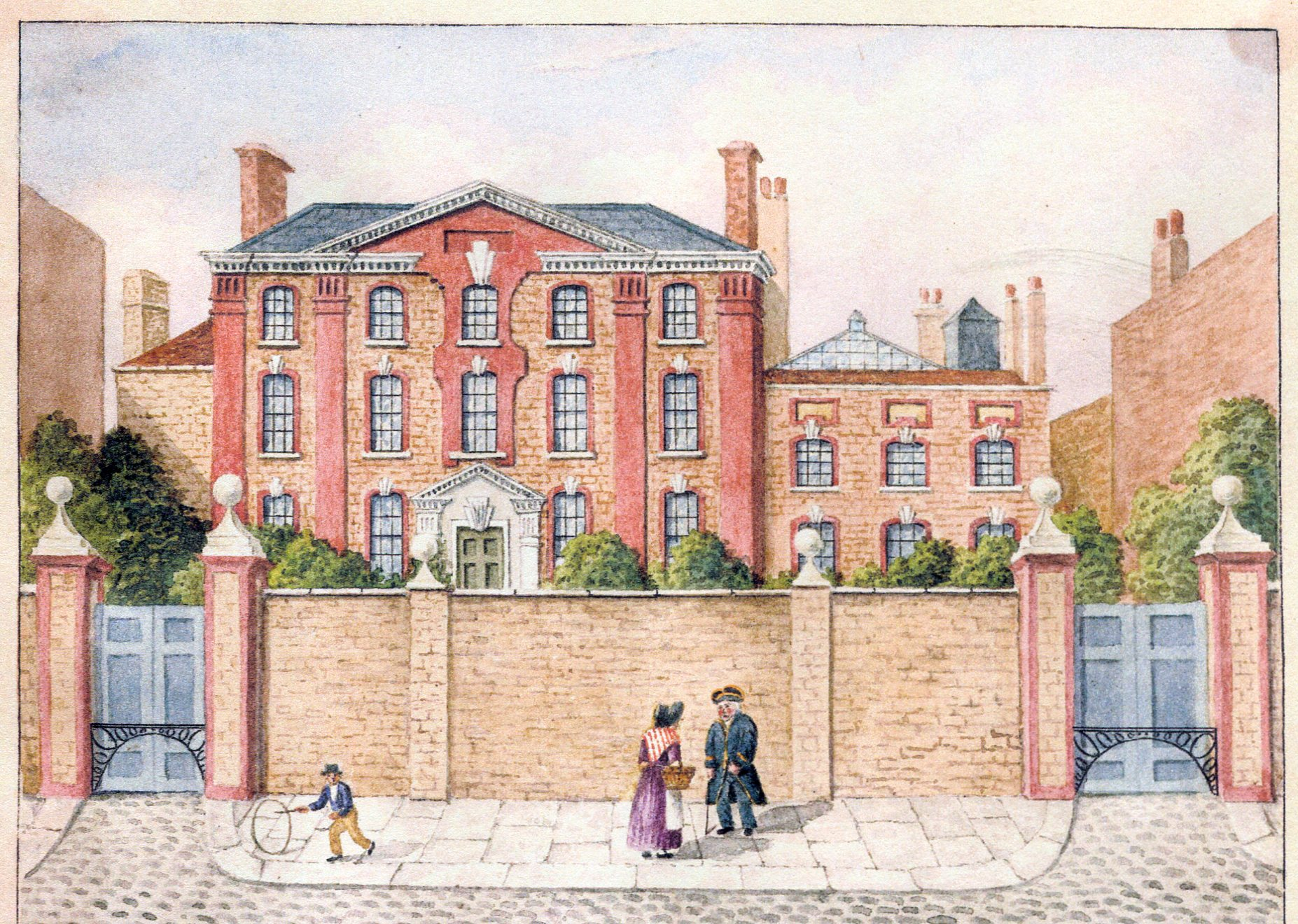
Burney's Academy in Greenwich in the 19th century

In 1782, Burney became a master at a private school in Chiswick run by William Rose. He married Rose's daughter Sarah (1759–1821) in 1783. When Rose died in 1786, Burney took over the school, moving it to nearby Hammersmith and then to Greenwich in 1793.

Many eminent naval and military officers were educated there, but he seems to have been such a disciplinarian that he provoked a rebellion of about 50 boys at some time in the early years of the 19th century. One boy described it in an undated letter to his mother. The boys took food, chessboards, cards and weapons, and barricaded themselves in: "Then Burney came and told them to open the door but they said it was not shut to be opened. He then got a ladder & got at the top of the door where he could see them all... till at last as the door was going to be cut open they unfastened it, when Burney rushed in. At first they hit him with their sticks but he knocked them about till at last they were quiet & Burney very generously gave them the choice of being expelled or forgiven; above 40 were forgiven and 2 expelled."

Burney transferred the school to his only child Charles Parr Burney (Archdeacon of Colchester) (1785–1864), who ran it from 1813 to 1833.

Burney gained a strong reputation as a Greek scholar with several publications. He was elected a fellow of the Royal Society in 1802. He made his peace with Cambridge University, which awarded him an MA in 1808 on his ordination as an Anglican priest. He advanced rapidly in the Church of England, becoming rector of the rich living of Cliffe, Kent, and of St Paul's, Deptford. He also served as a royal chaplain and as a prebendary of Lincoln Cathedral. He died of apoplexy, aged sixty.

== Memorials ==
There are memorials to Burney in Westminster Abbey, by Sebastian Gahagan, and St Paul's, Deptford, by Lewis Alexander Goblet.

== Partial bibliography ==
- Appendix ad lexicon Graeco-Latinum a Joan. Scapula constructum (1789)
- Remarks on the Greek Verses of Milton (1790)
- Richardi Bentleii et doctorum virorum epistolae (1807)
- Tentamen de metris ab Aeschylo in choricis cantibus adhibitis (1809)
- Philemonos lexikon technologikon (1812)

== See also ==
- Burney Collection of Newspapers
