= Julia Maitland =

English writer and traveller 1808–1864

Julia Charlotte Maitland (21 October 1808 – 29 January 1864), née Barrett, first married name Thomas, was an English writer and traveller, and the grandniece of the novelists Fanny Burney and Sarah Burney. She and her husband ran a boys' school in India, while strongly advocating a national system of education for the country.

== Family ==
Julia Barrett was born on 21 October 1808, probably in Richmond, Surrey, as the eldest of the five children of Henry Barrett (1756–1843) and his wife, Charlotte, née Francis (1786–1870), the niece of Fanny Burney (Madame D'Arblay), who first, rather drastically, edited her journals and letters. Julia was a favourite with the elderly Fanny, who remarked on her "very good sense, & a truly blyth juvenile love of humour". She and her sister Hetty (died 1833) suffered from tuberculosis and their mother took them to France and then Italy, where they came in touch with Fanny's sister Sarah Burney. Sarah Burney wrote of them in her correspondence and regularly described Julia as a beauty. Julia made a full recovery in 1834.

Julia Barrett's many admirers included Fanny Burney's parson son Alexander d'Arblay, but she chose instead to marry a widower with children, James Thomas (died 1840) on 2 August 1836, to the disappointment of her family. Thomas took her to India, where he was a judge in the Madras Presidency. They moved to Rajahmundry in 1837, where they kept a boys' school. Her son James Cambridge Thomas was born on 3 February 1839. The ill-health of her daughter Henrietta Anne Thomas (born 1837) obliged her to return to England in December 1839.

After her husband's death in 1840, Julia Thomas was remarried to Charles Maitland (1815–1866), a writer and Anglican curate of Lyndhurst, Hampshire, in the New Forest, on 5 November 1842. They had a daughter Julia Caroline (1843–1890). Maitland died of tuberculosis at the home of her son-in-law, Rev. David Wauchope, at Stower Provost, Dorset, on 29 January 1864.

== Writings and beliefs ==
Julia Maitland's first publication of note was her Letters from Madras, During the Years 1836–1839, by a Lady, which was published anonymously in 1843. The school she and her husband ran in Rajahmundry accepted boys of different castes and taught in both English and the local language ("Gentoo"). Controversially, it was strongly Christian. She also set up a multilingual reading room and assisted in starting other schools nearby. The book ends with a plea for a national system of education in India, as the route to modernization: "If every civilian up the country were to have a poor little school like ours, it would do something in time." She also made strong efforts to learn local languages, helped with famine relief, and investigated and condemned the South Indian slave trade.

Maitland later wrote three books for children, all popular in their day: Historical Acting Charades (1847); The Doll and Her Friends, or Memoirs of the Lady Seraphina, illustrated by Hablot Knight Browne (1852); and Cat and Dog, or Memoirs of Puss and the Captain, illustrated by Harrison Weir (1854). These were both humorous and didactic, promoting politeness, benevolence and generosity. She commented at the end of Cat and Dog, "I would propose Puss and Captain as an example of a new and better method of 'Living Like Cat and Dog'."
