= Frank Mercer =

Frank Mercer (1891–1955), was the editor of the 1935 reprint of Charles Burney's A General History of Music (1776–1789), 2 volumes, published by G. T. Foulis. The American edition (from the English printing) was published by Harcourt Brace in 1935. This edition was reprinted in 1957 by Dover Publications, of New York.

What drew Mercer to work on Burney remains to be discovered. He did his research in the library of the British Museum and the music library of the University of London. Dr Percy Scholes sent him a proof copy of his book The Puritans and Music (1934). The education departments of several Record Companies loaned him records. In his work, he was much assisted by his wife. Miss Burney, of Wandsworth, allowed him to copy and include a number of Charles Burney's letters, which were in her possession.

Mercer was very painstaking in his work. His own footnotes are prefixed with an asterisk and show his profound reading of the literature. Throughout the original work, all the musical examples were type-set, or engraved; Mercer transcribed these for the new publication, where they were printed as illustration blocks.

The reprint was favourably reviewed by "H. G." in The Musical Times in 1935, who commented "Praise is due to Mr Mercer. He has wisely refrained from over-editing; his notes are helpful and not too numerous, and his laborious task has been performed with an unusual blend of scholarship and modesty". Scott Goddard commented in Music & Letters, in 1936, "The book has long needed the very work which Mr Mercer has expended on it. His notes are excellent, as illuminating as they are copious, and as far as we have been able to verify them, trustworthy".

== Biography ==
Mercer was born in Bradford, Yorkshire, in March 1891. He was the son of William and Martha Mercer, and his father was a clothing manufacturer. Nothing is yet known about his musical education, but he was an accomplished solo pianist, giving concerts with the Bradford Permanent Orchestra, in Bradford in 1913, 1914 and 1922. He served in World War I, and he married Annie M. Chew in 1924 in the parish church of Wyke, Yorkshire. They had no children. By 1931, he had joined the music department of the North Western Polytechnic, Kentish Town, London, where he taught piano. He must have spent much time preparing his edition of Burney's General History of Music, which was published in 2 volumes in 1935. In 1939, he was living with his wife at an address in Fulham Road, Chelsea, London. They came to Bristol in 1944, perhaps because of a change of job, and moved to a house in Sefton Park Road. This was very near his brother in law and sister, James and Amy Briggs. Mercer was involved with the Bristol Amateur Operatic Society as musical director until the early 1950s when he resigned due to ill-health. As well as his work on Burney he also wrote a Record of Concerts in the 17th and 18th Centuries which was unpublished. As far as can be discovered he published nothing more. He died at Bristol, 17 January 1955, aged 64, after a long illness, and was cremated at Arno's Vale crematorium. He left no will. His widow died in March 1967.
