= Alexander Malcolm (writer on music) =

Alexander Malcolm (1685 - 1763) was a Scottish educator and the author of A Treatise on Musick, Speculative, Practical & Historical, Edinburgh, 1721.

Malcolm was born in Edinburgh on 25 December 1685, the son of a minister. Nothing is known of his education, but as a young man Malcolm became a mathematics teacher.

Malcolm's most important publication, A Treatise on Musick, Speculative, Practical & Historical, Edinburgh, was published in 1721, and reprinted in 1779. His other publications were New Treatise on Arithmetic and Book Keeping, Edinburgh, 1718 and A New System of Arithmetic, Theoretical and Practical London, 1730.

He was deeply influenced by treatises written by his contemporaries such as Descartes, Kircher and Mersenne. In his own treatise, A Treatise on Musick, Speculative, Practical & Historical, he admits that his main goal is to "gather together in one system what lay scattered in several treatises".

Charles Burney commented that Malcolm's work had considerable merit, but was too scientific for an elementary textbook and too superficial in the rules for practical harmony. Nevertheless, Ephraim Chambers used Malcolm extensively when writing the first edition of his Cyclopaedia.

Malcolm migrated to America, and in 1734 became the master of a grammar school in New York. He was appointed rector of St Michael's Church, Marblehead, Massachusetts in 1740, and in 1749 became rector of St Anne's Church, Annapolis, Maryland. Malcolm moved in 1754 on his appointment as rector of St Paul's Parish Church, in Queen Anne's County, Maryland. Later he was appointed master of the Free School there. Malcolm resigned this post in 1759, following a dispute over curriculum.

Malcolm died in June 1763.

== Sources ==
- Burney, Charles, 'Malcolm, Alexander' in Rees's Cyclopaedia, Vol 22, 1812, unpaginated. [This is largely a review of Malcolm's Treatise on Music. Burney did not mention him in his History of Music.]
- Maurer, Maurer, 'Alexander Malcolm in America', in Music & Letters, vol 33, No. 3, (July 1952) pp 226–231,
- Kassler, Jamie Kroy, The Science of Music in Britain: A Catalogue of writings, Lectures and Inventions, 2 vol, Garland, 1979 [Malcolm is discussed at pp 732–738 as well as numerous index references.]
- Heintze, James R., "Malcolm, Alexander." Grove Music Online. Oxford Music Online. Oxford University Press. Web. 3 October 2014. (Subscription required)
