= Edward Francis Burney =

English painter

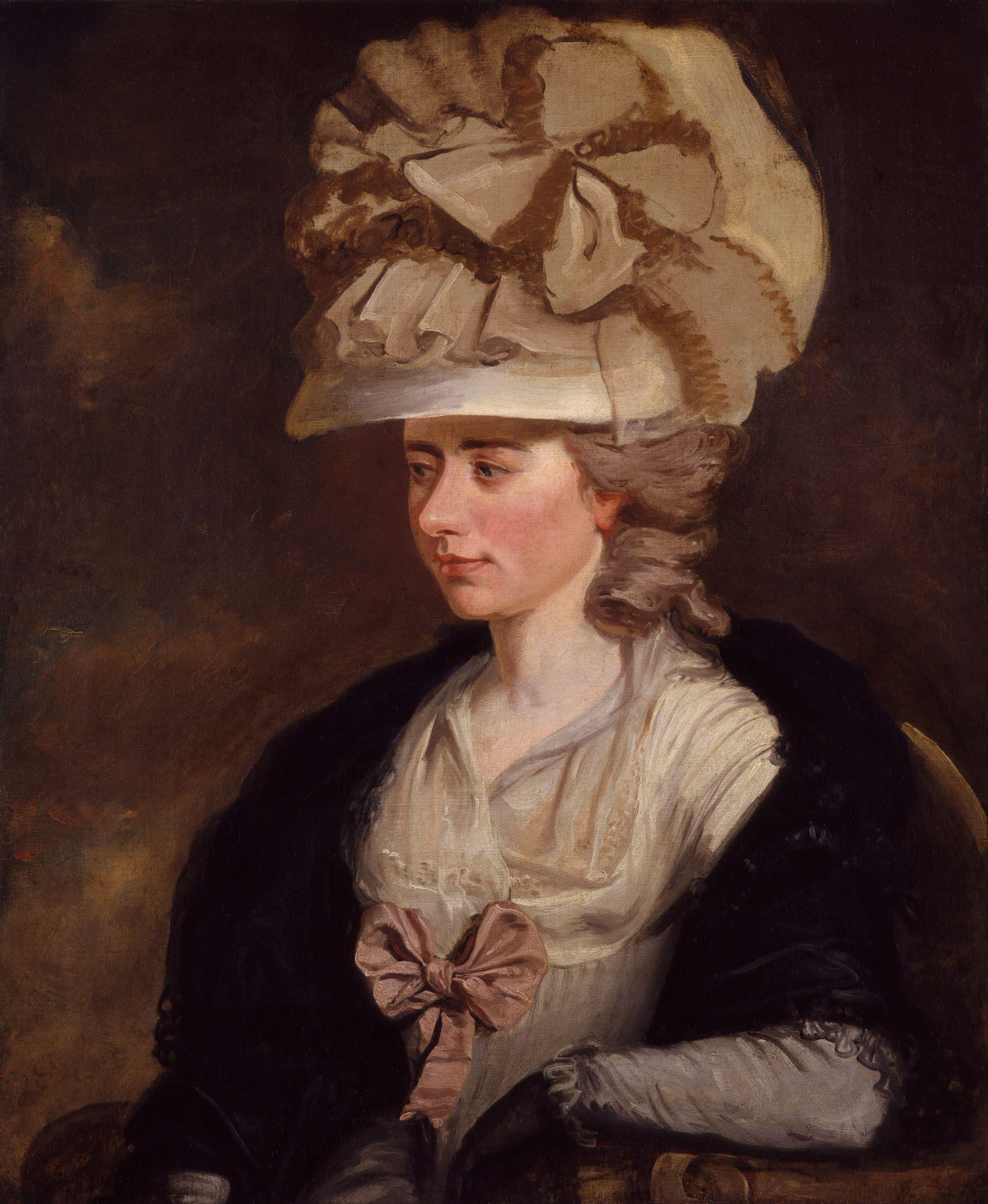
Portrait of Frances Burney, by Edward Francis Burney, circa 1784-1785, now at the National Portrait Gallery.

Edward Francis Burney (7 September 1760 – 16 December 1848) was an English painter. His middle name is sometimes given as "Francisco" or "Francesco".

== Life ==
Burney was born in Worcester on 7 September 1760, the son of Richard Burney and Elizabeth Humphries. The musicologist Charles Burney was his uncle and the writer Frances (or "Fanny") Burney was his cousin. He studied at the Royal Academy Schools from 1776, where he received encouragement from Sir Joshua Reynolds.

He exhibited at the Royal Academy from 1780 until 1803. His work included historical subjects and portraits of friends and family. A portrait of his cousin Frances was engraved as a frontispiece to her works, and in 1780 he exhibited three drawings illustrating her novel Evelina, which were engraved for a 1791 edition of the work. Much of his work was done for book illustrations, including a series for an edition of Milton's Paradise Lost.

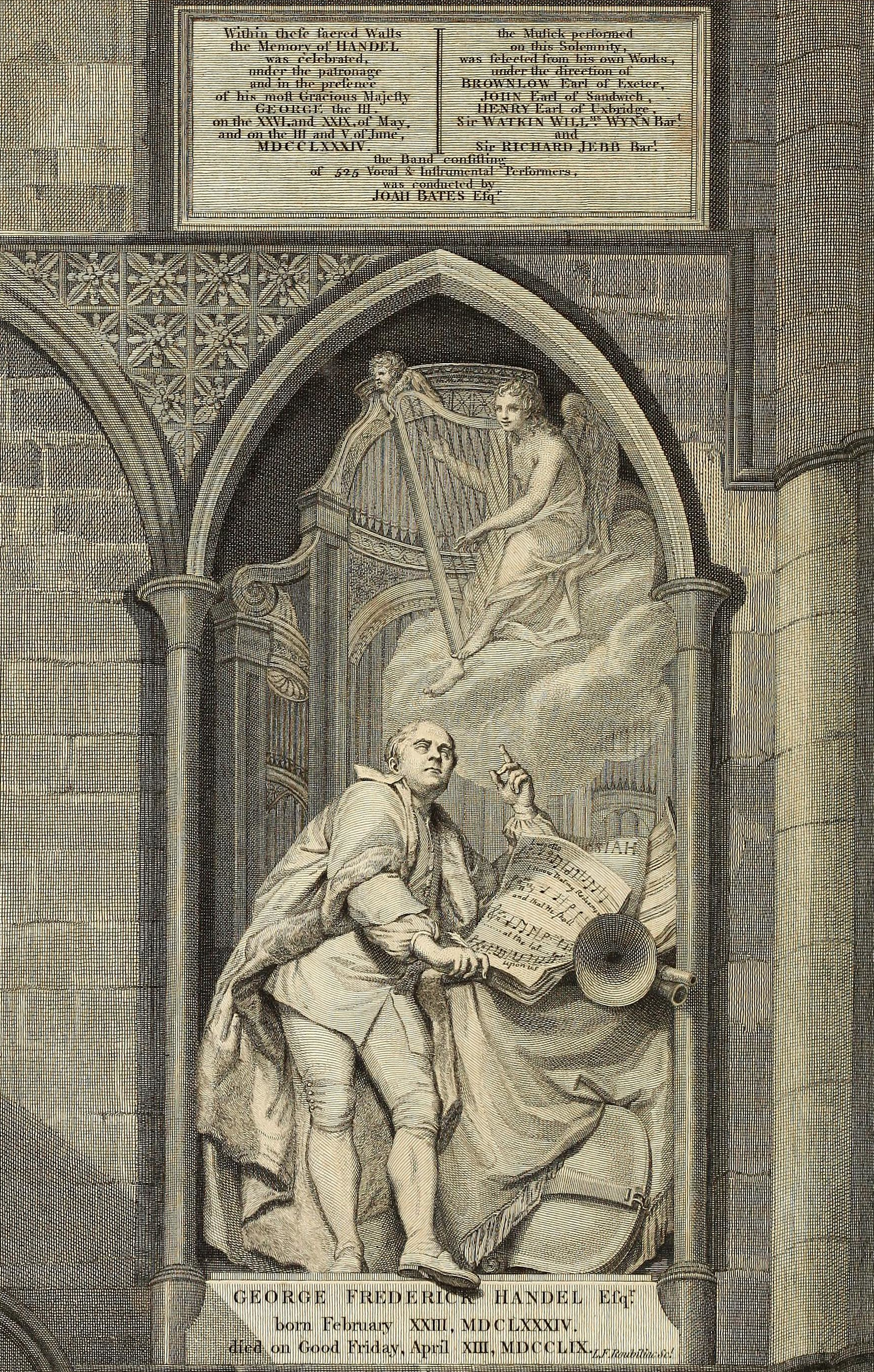
The monument to George Frideric Handel in Westminster Abbey with the plaque recording his Commemoration, from "An Account of the Musical Performances in Westminster Abbey, and the Pantheon, May 26, 27, 29 and June 3, 5, 1784, in Commemoration of Handel" by Charles Burney.

== Satirical works ==
In the 1820s Burney painted four large watercolours satirising contemporary musical and social life: The Waltz, The Elegant Establishment for Young Ladies (both Victoria and Albert Museum), Amateurs of Tye-Wig Music and The Glee Club; or, The Triumph of Music (both Yale Center for British Art), possibly with the intention of publishing prints after them. They were never engraved, but he did work up Amateurs of Tye-Wig Music into an oil painting, now in the collection of the Tate Gallery. The picture draws on the debate over the relative virtues of modern music (exemplified by Beethoven and Mozart) as against that of earlier composers, such as Handel, whose bust overlooks the ramshackle band of musicians in the painting, and Corelli, one of whose pieces they are playing. Burney's uncle Charles took a leading part in the argument, on the side of the modernists.

== Death ==
Burney died in London on 16 December 1848, at the age of 88. He never married.
