= James Burney =

English explorer and writer (1750–1821)

Rear-Admiral James Burney
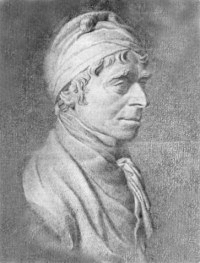
- Portrait of James Burney, c. 1790
- Born: 13 June 1750; London, England
- Died: 17 November 1821 (aged 71); London, England
- Occupations: Explorer; writer

James Burney (13 June 1750 – 17 November 1821) was an English explorer and writer. He served as a rear-admiral who accompanied Captain James Cook on his last two voyages. He later wrote two books on naval voyages and a third on the game of whist.

== Family ==
Burney was born in London, although he moved to Lynn Regis (now King's Lynn) as a small child. He was the son of the composer and music scholar Charles Burney and his wife Esther Sleepe (c. 1725–1762). His notable siblings included the correspondent Susanna Phillips, scholar Charles Burney, novelist and diarist Fanny Burney, and the novelist Sarah Burney, a half-sister, who kept house for him from 1798 to 1803.

== Voyages ==
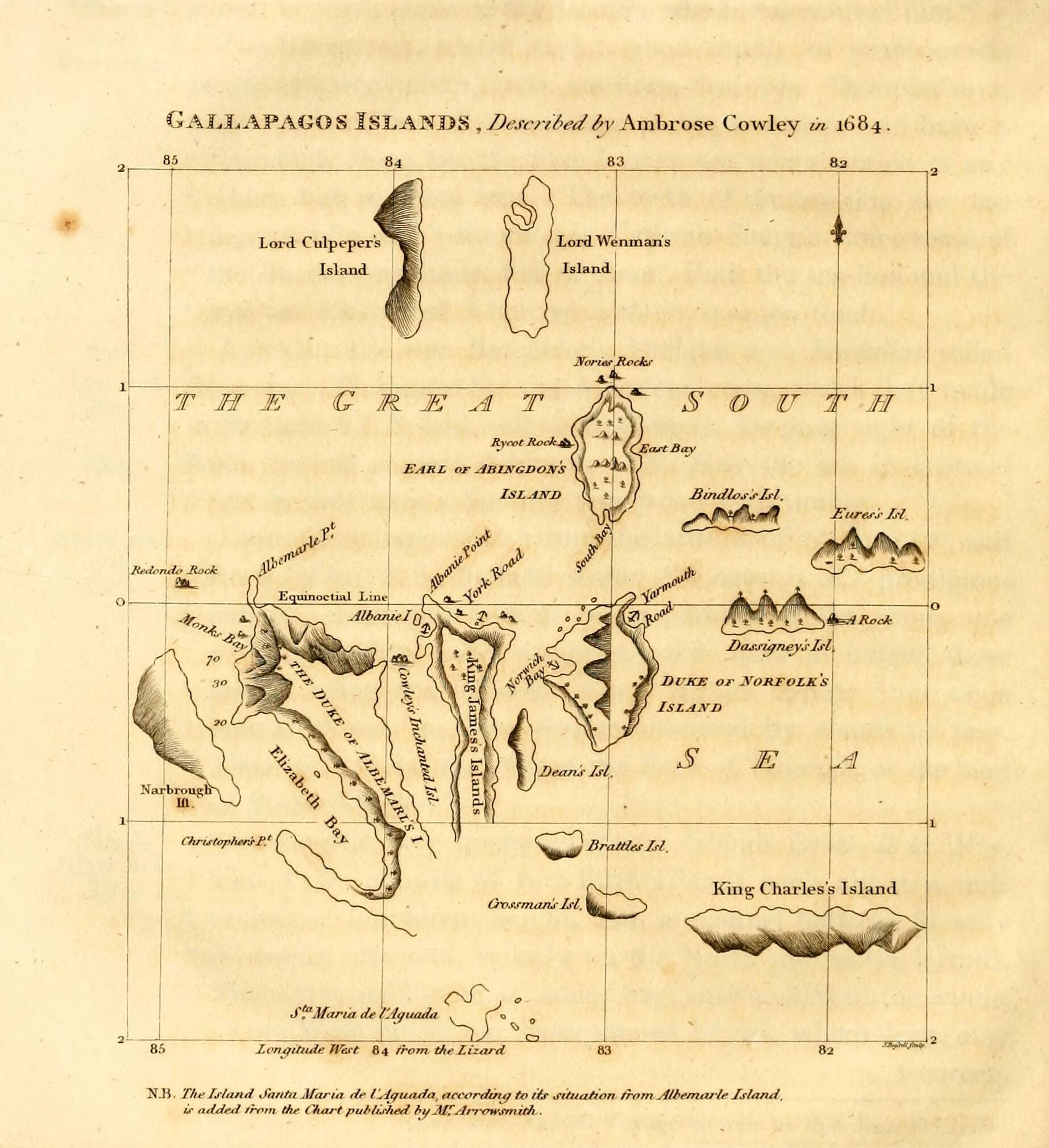

Burney's father obtained him a berth as a midshipman on Cook's Resolution, which sailed for the South Seas in June 1772. Back in England in 1774, he acted as interpreter for Omai, the first Tahitian to visit Britain. He and his future brother-in-law witnessed Cook's killing in Hawaii in 1779. He was belatedly promoted, but in June 1782 commissioned captain of the 50-gun Bristol on a 12-ship convoy to Madras. He saw action as part of Sir Edward Hughes' squadron in the final engagement with the French fleet off Cuddalore on 20 June 1783.

== Retired ==
At the end of 1784 Burney fell seriously ill and departed for England. This was the end of his active naval career. Repeated petitions for a new command were rebuffed, in part because of his openly republican political views. However, he became a prolific naval author, who enjoyed the friendship of Charles Lamb, Henry Crabb Robinson and other literary figures.

Burney married Sarah Payne (1759–1832) on 6 September 1785, by whom he had three children: Catherine (1786–1793), Martin Charles (1788–1852), later a solicitor, and Sarah (1796 – post-1868). However, he was separated from his wife and living with his half-sister from 1798 to 1803. He was elected a member of the Royal Society in 1809.

In July 1821, aged 71, Burney was promoted to rear-admiral on the retired list after a personal intervention by the Duke of Clarence (later William IV), Admiral of the Fleet. He died on 17 November 1821 and was buried at St. Margaret's, Westminster.

A great whist player, he left a pamphlet on the subject. When he died, Lamb wrote to William Wordsworth: "There's Captain Burney gone! – What fun has whist now?"

== Bibliography ==
- Chronological History of the Voyages and Discoveries in the South Sea or Pacific Ocean (London, 1803–1817), including History of the Buccaneers of America (1816) (5 volumes) v1 v2 v3 v4 v5
- "A memoir of the geography of the north-eastern part of Asia, and on the question whether Asia and America are contiguous, or are separated by the sea. By Captain James Burney, F. R. S.". Philosophical Transactions of the Royal Society of London. 108: 9–23. doi:10.1098/rstl.1818.0004. hdl:2027/aeu.ark:/13960/t0cv51h4s.
- Chronological History of North-Eastern Voyages of Discovery and of the Early Eastern Navigations of the Russians (London: Payne & Foss, 1819)
- An Essay by Way of Lecture on the Game of Whist (London: privately printed, 1821)
- "Account of the Lizard of Siam, with Observations, by Captain Burney, Envoy to Siam in 1826". The Edinburgh Journal of Science. 9: 100–101. 1828.
