= Sarah Burney =

English novelist (1772–1844)

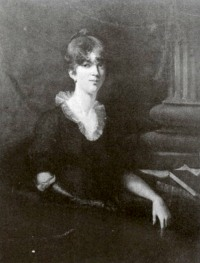
- Portrait of Sarah Burney, c. 1790
- Born: Sarah Burney; 29 August 1772 King's Lynn, Norfolk, England
- Died: 8 February 1844 (aged 71) Cheltenham, Gloucestershire, England
- Occupation: Novelist
- Relatives: Frances Burney (half-sister); James Burney (half-brother); Charles Burney (father)

Signature
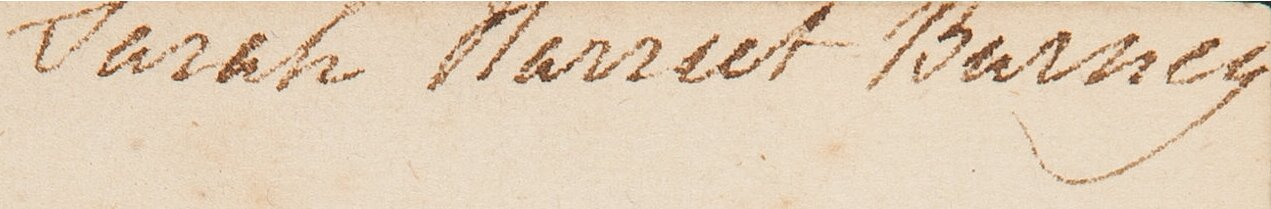

Sarah Harriet Burney (29 August 1772 – 8 February 1844) was an English novelist. She was the daughter of the musicologist and composer Charles Burney and half-sister of the novelist and diarist Frances Burney (Madame d'Arblay). She had some intermittent success with her novels.

== Life ==
Sarah Burney was born at Lynn Regis, now King's Lynn, and baptised there on 29 September 1772. Her mother, Elizabeth Allen, was the second wife of Charles Burney, and relations within the family were often strained. Sarah was brought up in Norfolk by relations of her mother until 1775, when she joined the Burney household in London. This reunion features in a letter from Frances Burney to the dramatist Samuel Crisp: "Now for family.... Little Sally is come home, and is one of the most innocent, artless, queer little things you ever saw, and altogether she is very sweet, and a very engaging child." In 1781 she was sent with her brother Richard (1768–1808) to Corsier-sur-Vevey, Switzerland, to complete her education and probably returned in 1783. She gained an excellent knowledge of French and Italian, and acted as an interpreter for French refugee nobles on several occasions.

As an adult Burney alternated between nursing elderly parents in Chelsea (her mother up to 1796, her father from 1807 to 1814) and periods as a governess and companion, as she was not wealthy. Life with an ill-tempered father suited Burney even less after her mother died. Her half-brother Rear Admiral James Burney (1750–1821), having separated from his wife, wished to move back in with his father and sister, but his father forbade it. So there was family consternation when Sarah and James absconded together and spent the years 1798–1803 living in some penury in Bristol and then London. It has even been suggested that their relations were incestuous. The assumption has been challenged in detail in a more recent, closely researched account of Burney's life and personality. Sarah's surviving bank statements show that her small wealth was much depleted over this period.

In 1807, Sarah Burney moved back again to nurse Charles Burney, but her relations with her father remained poor and she inherited very little when he died in 1814, though she had served as his housekeeper and amanuensis. She lived in Italy from 1829 to 1833, mainly in Florence. There is an appreciative description of her in the diary of Henry Crabb Robinson, who met her in Rome in 1829. She coincided in Italy with her niece and favourite correspondent, Charlotte Barrett (1786–1870), who was nursing her two daughters through tuberculosis. One died, but the other, Julia Maitland, later made a full recovery. It is unclear why Sarah Burney's relations with her niece cooled for some years after that period, but it may have been felt she had not to have given the Barretts all the practical help that they expected in Italy.

Life in Italy was cheaper, but Burney felt increasingly lonely there. She returned in 1833 to live in Bath. Despite financial help from Frances Burney, who also left her £1,000 in her will, she was short of money. This prompted her to revise and publish a pair of short novels she had begun earlier. Sarah Burney moved to Cheltenham in 1841, where she died three years later, aged 71.

== Relationship with Fanny Burney ==
Sarah Burney's relations with her sister Frances or Fanny seem to have been good, although they became more distant as time went on. The references to Sarah in Frances Burney's journals and letters before her marriage to Gen. Alexandre d'Arblay are few, unsurprising as there were twenty years between them, but they are kind and affectionate: "Sarah is well, & a great comfort to me," she wrote around 19 December 1791. On several days in 1792 Sarah accompanied her to hearings of the Impeachment of Warren Hastings. The two half-sisters seem to have shared a room at their father's house in Chelsea. On 2 June 1792 "I returned late to Chelsea [from her friend Mrs. Orde's house], fetched by Sarah, very good humouredly, for the sake of the ride Tête à Tête."

One thing that Sarah had in common with Frances was sympathy and enthusiasm for refugees of the French Revolution. Staying at Bradfield Hall, Suffolk, in August 1792 Sarah was said to be "living upon French politics & with French fugitives at Bradfield [home of her uncle by marriage, Arthur Young, where she seems perfectly satisfied with foreign forage." Frances joined her there in October. Among those the sisters were pleased to meet was the prominent social reformer Duc de Liancourt, although at one point he inveighed against femmes de lettres. Writing to their father about the visit, Frances added, "Sarah's French has been of great use to [Lancourt], in explanations with Mr. and Mrs. Young." In the following year Sarah is said to have been "enchanted" by D'Arblay, and usefully positive about him in front of her father, who initially had not taken to him at all.

There is a glimpse of Sarah as a young woman in a report of a conversation between Fanny, her two-year-old son Alexander, and Queen Charlotte in March 1798. (Fanny had been "second keeper of the robes" to the Queen in 1788–90.) "'And what a pretty Frock you've got on!'" said the Queen to Alexander. "'Who made it you? Mama? – or little Aunty [Sarah]?' It was Mama; – poor little Aunty has not the most distant idea of such an exertion; nor, here, was it either necessary, or to be expected. The Queen asked a few questions about her then, as if willing to know what kind of character she had; – 'very clever', I answered; a little excentric [sic], but good in principles, & lively & agreeable.'"

Fanny tried to play a conciliatory role when Sarah and James abruptly left their father's house, although she was aware of the immoral construction put upon it by James's wife and to some extent by Mary Rushton, their stepsister, who was staying with Charles Burney at the time. Later Fanny was annoyed by what she saw as a rebuff from James when she tried to reopen family relations. However, this was the third family crisis precipitated by her father: both Fanny and her sister Charlotte had been out of favour for a while after their marriages. Sarah eventually paid a morning call on her father in April 1799 and correspondence with her sister Fanny was resumed in May.

Sarah Burney's life as a whole can be seen as one of recurrent loneliness and of relationships with relatives and friends that fade or dissolve in discord after a few months or years. Her fiction certainly contributed to a meagre income, but it may also have helped to make up for a meagre social life.

== Bibliography ==
Sarah Burney wrote seven works of fiction.

- Clarentine (1796). A second edition appeared in 1820.
- Geraldine Fauconberg (1808)
- Traits of Nature (1812). This was successful also in French as Tableaux de la nature in 1812.
- Tales of Fancy: The Shipwreck (1816). This was published in French as Le Naufrage in 1816 and in German as Der Schiffbruch in 1821.
- Tales of Fancy: Country Neighbours (1820)
- The Romance of Private Life: The Renunciation and The Hermitage (1839)

=== Clarentine (1796) & Geraldine Facuonberg (1808) ===
It seems that Sarah Burney's father was unenthusiastic about her first work, Clarentine, a novel of manners. It appeared anonymously about the same time as Frances Burney's third novel, Camilla, which by contrast he "ardently promoted." The character of the charming Chevalier de Valcour is said to have been modelled closely on D'Arblay. Jane Austen disliked Clarentine, writing: "We [the Austen family] are reading 'Clarentine,' & are surprised to find how foolish it is. I remember liking it much less on a 2d reading than at the 1st & it does not bear a 3d at all. It is full of unnatural conduct & forced difficulties, without striking merit of any kind."

Geraldine Fauconberg, an epistolary novel, was also published anonymously, as was common among women writers at that time.

=== Traits of Nature (1812) ===
Burney's third novel, Traits of Nature, was a popular success, with the first edition selling out in four months. Its publisher, Henry Colburn, paid her £50 for each of the five volumes of Traits of Nature, which appeared under her own name, although he was concerned that they should not be confused with works by a probably pseudonymous Caroline Burney, which had appeared in 1809 and 1810. Traits of Nature was reprinted at least once in the same year (in four volumes). and was still available in 1820. It is a large-scale treatment of family and inter-family relationships in the capital and the countryside, with strong emphasis on morality.

The novel incidentally comments on many aspects of life in the 1810s. One example is a shift in upper-class education and children's story-telling from fantasy to didacticism. She has the 14-year-old Christina Cleveland remark to the heroine, Adela, "Well, then; you know fairy-tales are forbidden pleasures in all modern school-rooms. Mrs. Barbauld, and Mrs. Trimmer, and Miss Edgeworth, and a hundred others, have written good books for children, which have thrown poor Mother Goose, and the Arabian Nights, quite out of favour;—at least, with papas and mamas."

The black maid Amy, who accompanies the seven-year-old Adela to her foster parents, leaves a household where Adela's brother Julius can ridicule her and heap her with racial slurs, into one where she is treated kindly, if somewhat condescendingly by modern standards. Amy continues to play an intermittent, positive role to the end of the story. There is implied criticism of the bluestocking aspirations of some women in that period, noted by the anonymous reviewer in The Critical Review, who quoted a passage in which the heroine Adela's wayward brother Julius twits his cousin Barbara for learning obscure foreign languages but remaining "shamefully ignorant of good plain English." The reviewer saw most of the characters as "old acquaintances only in new situations", rather than originals, and noted some similarities with Fanny Burney's Cecilia (1792) and even between the heroine and Evelina, the eponymous heroine of Fanny Burney's 1778 novel. Nonetheless, he called the novel accomplished and singled out the character of Adela's wayward brother Julius as original and well-drawn. Modern readers may notice that the plot relies on a number of coincidences and its ends are tied up somewhat abruptly. The book was also reviewed in the prestigious Quarterly Review and elsewhere.

=== Tales of Fancy (1816-1820) and The Romance of Private Life (1839) ===
The Shipwreck (1816) earned her £100, and Country Neighbours (1820), apart from other things, a congratulatory sonnet from Charles Lamb, who was a personal friend. There were American editions and French translations of some of Sarah Burney's works, but they do not appear to have been reprinted in English after their author's death. The pair of novels that make up The Romance of Private Life were sparsely reviewed, although there was an American edition in 1840.

Interest in Sarah Burney's work began to revive as part of a general, in some cases feminist interest in all women writers of that period. This was supported by some print-on-demand editions in the early years of the millennium, and more importantly by a meticulous critical edition of The Romance of Private Life, which appeared in 2008. Her letters have also been collected.

=== Renunciation and The Hermitage ===
Both Renunciation and The Hermitage are mystery stories with beauteous, virtuous heroines, but the plots are otherwise unrelated. The elderly protector whom the heroine meets on her flight from Paris may have resembled H. Crabb Robertson. The denouement is delightfully complicated. Much the same can be said of The Hermitage, but here the marrying of an earlier story and an ending composed later seems more visible, so that some of the momentum of the story is lost after the murder, partly due to the introduction of a distractingly comic character, a spinster-companion, who has been compared with the prolix Miss Bates in Jane Austen's Emma (1815). Several aspects of the story recur in Wilkie Collins' The Moonstone (1868), a seminal work in the development of the murder mystery: the return of a childhood companion, the sexual symbolism of defloration implied in the crime, and the almost catatonic reactions of the heroine to her discovery of it. Nonetheless, it seems to show some decline in terms of plot and characterisation since the more plausible and human Country Neighbours.

Sarah Burney's positive, but modest reputation as a novelist in her day was summed up in a memoir of her father: "A still younger sister followed the track of Madame D['Arblay]., with considerable, though not equal success."
