= Charles Burney =

English music historian (1726–1814)

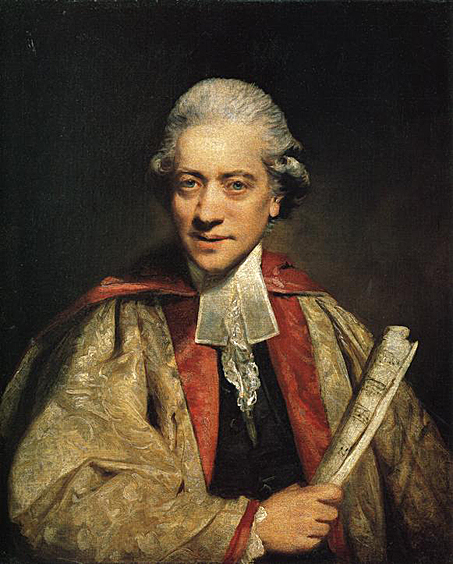
- Portrait by Sir Joshua Reynolds, 1781
- Born: 7 April 1726; Shrewsbury, England
- Died: 12 April 1814 (aged 88); Chelsea, London, England
- Occupations: Music historian; composer; musician
- Relatives: Frances Burney (daughter); Sarah Burney (daughter); Susan Burney (daughter); James Burney (son); Charles Burney (son)

Charles Burney FRS (7 April 1726 – 12 April 1814) was an English music historian, composer and musician. He was the father of the writers Frances Burney and Sarah Burney, of the explorer James Burney, and of Charles Burney, a classicist and book donor to the British Museum. He was a close friend and supporter of Joseph Haydn, Johann Christian Bach, and other composers.

== Early life and career ==
Charles Burney was born at Raven Street, Shrewsbury, the fourth of six children of James Macburney (1678–1749), a musician, dancer and portrait painter, and his second wife Ann (née Cooper, c. 1690–1775). In childhood he and a brother Richard (1723–1792) were for unknown reasons sent to the care of a "Nurse Ball" at nearby Condover, where they lived until 1739. He began formal education at Shrewsbury School in 1737 and was later sent in 1739 to The King's School, Chester, where his father then lived and worked. His first music master was a Mr Baker, the cathedral organist, and a pupil of John Blow. Returning to Shrewsbury at the age of 15, Burney continued his musical studies for three years under his half-brother, James Burney, organist of St Mary's Church, and was then sent to London as a pupil of Thomas Arne for three years.

Burney wrote some music for Arne's Alfred, which was produced at Drury Lane Theatre on 30 March 1745. In 1749 he was appointed organist of St Dionis Backchurch, Fenchurch Street, with a salary of £30 a year. According to the voting book, he secured the post against six other candidates with votes 50 to 4. He was also engaged to take the harpsichord in the "New Concerts" then recently established at the King's Arms, Cornhill. It was for his health that he went in 1751 to Lynn Regis in Norfolk, where he was elected organist, with an annual salary of £100. He lived there for nine years. During that time he began to entertain the idea of writing a general history of music. His Ode for St Cecilia's Day was performed at Ranelagh Gardens in 1759. In 1760 he returned to London in good health and with a young family. His eldest child, Esther, a girl of eight, surprised the public with her achievements as a harpsichord player. The concertos for harpsichord which Burney published soon after his return to London were much admired. In 1766 he produced, at Drury Lane, a translation and adaptation of Jean-Jacques Rousseau's opera Le Devin du village, under the title of The Cunning Man.

== Family and social life ==
In 1749, while working as an organist and harpsichordist in London, Charles married Esther Sleepe (c.1725–1762). The couple had six children: Esther or Hetty, who later became Mrs Burney on marrying her cousin Charles Rousseau Burney, the explorer James Burney, the celebrated writer Frances Burney (often called Fanny), the correspondent Susan (Susy), Charlotte (later Mrs Francis), and Charles Burney, a classicist and school headmaster.

As vividly recorded by Fanny, the family moved in a lively cultural circle in London, which included the portrait painter Sir Joshua Reynolds, the lexicographer Samuel Johnson, the playwright Richard Brinsley Sheridan, the composers Harriet Wainwright and Joseph Haydn, the essayist Edmund Burke and the MP for Southwark Henry Thrale, whose wife Hester Thrale was a close friend of Fanny's.

Charles's first wife Esther died in 1761. In 1767 he was married a second time, to Elizabeth Allen (Mrs Stephen Allen) of Lynn. From this union he had a son, Richard Thomas, and a daughter, Sarah Harriet Burney, who became a novelist.

== Later career ==
The University of Oxford honoured Burney, on 23 June 1769, with the degrees of Bachelor and Doctor of Music, and his own work was performed. This consisted of an anthem, with an overture, solos, recitatives and choruses, accompanied by instruments, besides a vocal anthem in eight parts, which was not performed. In 1769 he published An essay towards a history of the principal comets that have appeared since 1742. Amidst his various professional avocations, Burney never lost sight of his main project, his History of Music. He decided to travel abroad and collect materials that could not be found in Britain. He left London in June 1770, carrying numerous letters of introduction, and travelled to Paris, Geneva, Turin, Milan, Padua, Venice, Bologna (where he met Wolfgang Amadeus Mozart and his father), Florence, Rome and Naples. The results of his observations were published in a well-received book, The Present State of Music in France and Italy (1771). In July 1772 Burney again visited the continent to do further research, and on his return to London published an account of his tour under the title The Present State of Music in Germany, the Netherlands and United Provinces (1773). In 1773 he was elected a fellow of the Royal Society.

In 1776 appeared the first volume (in quarto) of Burney's long-projected History of Music. In 1782 Burney published his second volume; and in 1789 the third and fourth. The History of Music was generally well received, although criticized by Forkel in Germany and by the Spanish ex-Jesuit, Requeno, who in his Saggj sul Ristabilimento dell' Arte Armonica de' Greci e Romani Canton (Parma, 1798) attacked Burney's account of ancient Greek music and called him lo scompigliato Burney (the confused Burney). The fourth volume covers the birth and development of opera and the musical scene in England in Burney's time. Burney's first tour was translated into German by Christoph Daniel Ebeling, and printed at Hamburg in 1772. His second tour, translated into German by Johann Joachim Christoph Bode, was published at Hamburg in 1773. A Dutch translation of his second tour, with notes by J. W. Lustig, organist at Groningen, was published there in 1786. The Dissertation on the Music of the Ancients, in the first volume of Burney's History, was translated into German by Johann Joachim Eschenburg, and printed at Leipzig, 1781. Burney derived much aid from the first two volumes of Padre Martini's very learned Storia della Musica (Bologna, 1757–1770).

In 1774 he had written A Plan for a Music School. In 1779 he wrote for the Royal Society an account of the young William Crotch, whose remarkable musical talent excited so much attention at that time. In 1784 he published, with an Italian title page, the music annually performed in the Pope's chapel at Rome during Passion Week. In 1785 he published, for the benefit of the Musical Fund, an account of the first commemoration of George Friedrich Handel in Westminster Abbey in the preceding year, with a life of Handel. In 1796 he published Memoirs and Letters of Metastasio.

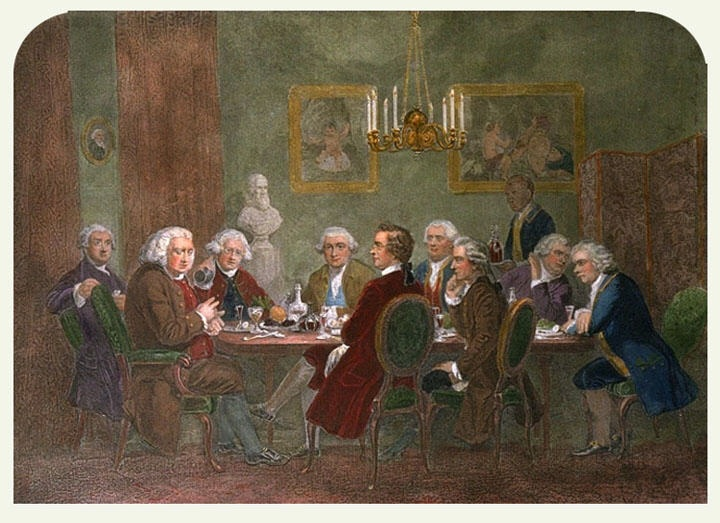
A literary party at Sir Joshua Reynolds's. Left to right: James Boswell, Samuel Johnson, Joshua Reynolds, David Garrick, Edmund Burke, Pasquale Paoli, Charles Burney, a servant (possibly Francis Barber), Thomas Warton, Oliver Goldsmith. (select a detail of the image for more information)

Towards the close of his life Burney was paid £1000 for contributing to Rees's Cyclopædia all the musical articles not belonging to the department of natural philosophy and mathematics. The latter were written by John Farey, Sr and Jr. Burney's contribution to Rees included much new material which had not appeared in his earlier writings, particularly about the London music scene then. In 1783, through the treasury influence of his friend Edmund Burke, he was appointed organist to the chapel of the Royal Hospital Chelsea. He moved there from St Martin's Street, Leicester Square and remained there for the rest of his life. He penned and published a sonnet in honour of Joseph Haydn, whom he had been in correspondence with throughout Haydn's two trips to London. His admiration for Handel greatly influenced Haydn's decision to focus on oratorio upon his return to Vienna, which would eventually result in the composition of The Creation. In 1810, he was made a member of the Institute of France and nominated a correspondent in the class of the fine arts. From 1806 until his death he enjoyed a pension of £300 granted by Charles James Fox. He died at Chelsea College on 12 April 1814, and was interred in the burial ground of the college. A tablet was erected to his memory in Westminster Abbey.

Burney's library was sold at auction by John White of Westminster beginning on 8 August 1814.

== Likenesses and accounts ==
Burney's portrait was painted by Reynolds in 1781 for Henry Thrale's library. His bust was cut by Nollekens in 1805. He also appears in James Barry's The Thames (also known as Triumph of Navigation), which was painted in 1791 for the Royal Society of Arts. He had a wide circle of acquaintance among the distinguished artists and literary men of his day. At one time he thought of writing a life of his friend Samuel Johnson, but retired before the crowd of biographers who rushed into that field.

Burney's eldest son, James Burney, was a distinguished officer in the Royal Navy, who died a rear-admiral in 1821, having accompanied Captain Cook on his last two voyages. His second son was the Rev. Charles Burney, a major donor of books to the British Museum, and his second daughter was Frances or Fanny, the novelist, later Madame D'Arblay. Her published diary and letters contain many minute and interesting particulars of her father's public and private life, and of his friends and contemporaries, including his initial opposition to her marriage to the French refugee Alexandre D'Arblay in 1793 and to her sister Charlotte's remarriage to the pamphleteer and stock jobber Ralph Broome in 1798. A life of Burney was compiled by Madame D'Arblay and appeared in 1832, but it has been criticized consistently for being eulogistic. His daughter by his second marriage, Sarah Burney, was likewise a novelist. Her letters provide interesting, less adulatory information about her father. Although Sarah looked after him in his old age, their personal relations remained poor.

== Cultural references ==
Samuel Johnson drew inspiration from The Present State of Music in France and Italy (1771), according to later writers: "Dr. Burney published an account of his tour ... which was extremely well received, and deemed by the best judges so good a model for travellers who were inclined to give a description of what they had seen or observed, that Dr. Johnson professedly imitated it in his own Tour of the Hebrides, saying, 'I had that clever dog Burney's Musical Tour in my eye.'"

Burney appears in a story by Lillian de la Torre (Lillian Bueno McCue, 1902–1993), an American writer of historical mysteries, entitled "The Viotti Stradivarius", part of her series featuring Samuel Johnson as a "detector" (detective). The story features a fictitious meeting between Burney, his daughter Fanny, Giovanni Battista Viotti and his Stradivarius, and Grigory Grigoryevich Orlov, along with Johnson and James Boswell, in connection with the theft and recovery of the Orlov diamond.

== Compositions ==
1. The Cunning Man, an adaptation of Jean-Jacques Rousseau's opera Le Devin du village (1766–67)
2. Six Sonatas for the harpsichord (1761)
3. Two Sonatas for the harpsichord or piano, with accompaniments for violin and violoncello; 2 sets (1769 and 1772)
4. Sonatas for two violins and a bass, op. 4 (1759)
5. Six Lessons for the harpsichord
6. Six Duets for two German flutes
7. Three Concertos for the harpsichord
8. Six Cornet Pieces with an introduction and fugue for the organ
9. Six Concertos for the violin, etc., in eight parts, op. 5 (c. 1760)
10. Two Sonatas for pianoforte, violin and violoncello
11. Four Sonatas or Duets for two Performers on One Piano Forte or Harpsichord (1777)
12. Anthems, etc.
13. 6 Songs composed for the Temple of Apollo, book 1, op. 2 (c. 1750)
14. I will love thee, O Lord my strength (Psalm xviii), solo, chorus, orchestra, DMus exercise (1769)
15. XII. Canzonetti a due voci in Canone, poesia deli' Abate Metastasio (c. 1790)
16. Preludes, Fugues, and Interludes; for the Organ. Alphabetically arranged in all the keys that are most perfectly in tune upon that Instrument & printed in a Pocket size for the convenience of Young Organists, for whose use this book is particularly calculated & Published by Chas. Burney, Mus:D.

== Burney's papers ==
After his death in 1814, Burney's daughter Frances destroyed many manuscripts, including his journals, and obliterated passages in others. Burney's library was sold at auction in London by Leigh & Sotheby on 9 June 1814 (and eight following days); a copy of the sale catalogue is held at Cambridge University Library (shelfmark Munby.c.163(7)). Surviving papers are widely scattered: in the Osborn Collection at Yale University, the Berg Collection at New York Public Library, the British Library and the Bodleian Library, Oxford, and in smaller public and private collections. (See Roger Lonsdale, Dr Charles Burney, a Literary Biography, Oxford 1965 pp 495–497.) The Burney Centre at McGill University, Montreal, Canada, has long been publishing the papers of the Burney family, including those of Charles and his daughter, Francis (Fanny Burney).

The Letters of Dr Charles Burney (1751–1814) General Editor: Peter Sabor

A scholarly edition of the Letters of Dr Charles Burney is being published in six volumes by Oxford University Press:

- Vol 1 1751–1784 edited by Alvaro Ribeiro, SJ, ISBN 0-19-812687-5
- Vol 2 1785–1793 (forthcoming) edited by Lorna Clark
- Vol 3 1794–1800 (forthcoming) edited by Stewart Cooke ISBN 978-0-19-873984-5
- Vol 4 1801–1806 (forthcoming) edited by Stewart Cooke
- Vol 5 1807–1809 (forthcoming) edited by Nancy Johnson
- Vol 5 1810–1814 (forthcoming) edited by Peter Sabor

== See also ==
- Gott erhalte Franz den Kaiser – a verse translation by Burney
