= List of Minerva Press authors =

This is an alphabetical list of authors who published at Minerva Press, or with William Lane before he coined the name, between the founding of the press in 1790 and 1820 or so when Lane's successor, A. K. Newman, dropped "Minerva" from the company title.

Minerva Press was a publishing house notable for creating a lucrative market in sentimental and Gothic fiction in the late 18th and early 19th centuries. It was established in or about 1790 when William Lane (c. 1745–1814) moved his circulating library to No 33 Leadenhall Street, London.

Minerva Press has been, and continues to be, a subject of considerable interest for scholars of print and popular cultures, women's writing, and the Romantic period. There is also a market for modern reissues of novels from Minerva and other Gothic authors: Valancourt Books has reissued a number of Minerva titles and Broadview Press has produced several scholarly editions of early Gothic novels.

Many of Minerva's authors remain obscure, however, as they published anonymously or under pseudonyms. Many of these attributions remain uncertain and new scholarship continues to emerge.

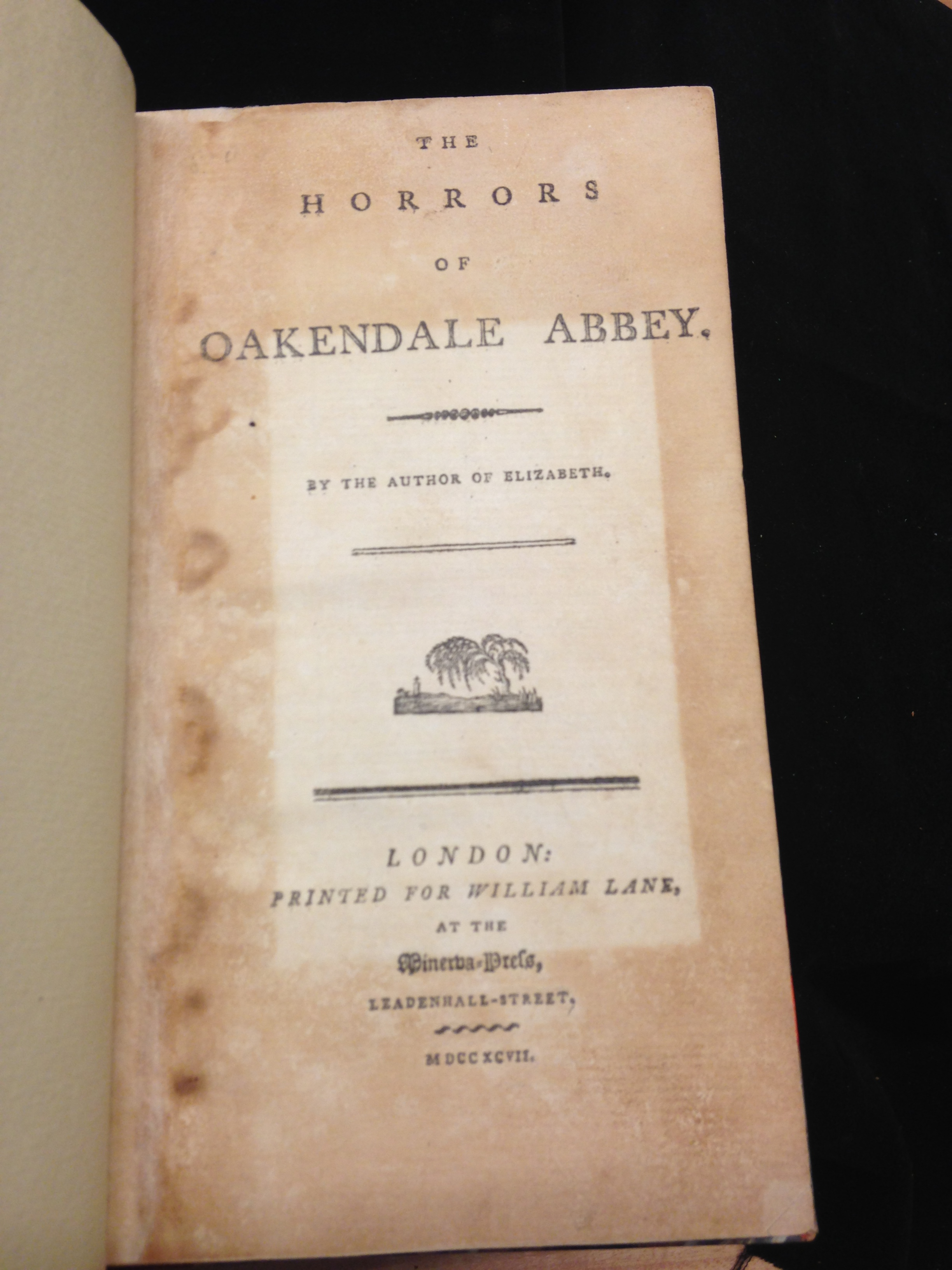
Title page of Mrs Carver's The Horrors of Oakendale Abbey (Minerva Press, 1797)

== A ==
- Anonymous: a significant proportion of Minerva Press titles, such as The Animated Skeleton (1798), were published either anonymously or under pseudonyms.
- Leslie Armstrong (fl. 1806): one novel published by Minerva: The Anglo-Saxons (1806)
- Lieut. Arnold (fl. 1808–1810): three novels published by Minerva, including The British Admiral (1808)
- Thomas Ashe (1770–1835): published one novel with Minerva

== B ==
- François-Thomas-Marie de Baculard d'Arnaud (1718–1805): influential French author frequently translated into English. At least one novel published by Minerva.
- Robert Bage (1730–1801): author of half a dozen novels, including James Wallace (1788)
- Richard Harris Barham (1788–1845): at least one novel with Minerva
- Eaton Stannard Barrett (1786–1820): one novel with Minerva, The Metropolis; or, A Cure for Gaming
- James Barton (fl. 1804): author of Honorina (1804)
- Amelia Beauclerc (fl. 1810s): author of at least eight novels between 1810 and 1820, six published with Minerva
- Nugent Bell (pseud? fl. 1817): Alexena published by Minerva in 1817.
- Anna Maria Bennett (c. 1750 – 1808): author of half a dozen novels between 1795 and 1806, one of which, Vicissitudes Abroad (1806), was published by Minerva.
- Elizabeth Bennett (fl. 1816–1819): published two novels with Minerva, including Emily (1819)
- John Brereton Birch (fl. 1797): translator of The Cousins of Schiras (1797)
- Elizabeth Bonhôte (née Mapes; 1744–1818): author of at least nine novels between 1773 and 1810
- Joseph Bounden (fl. 1805–1824): poet and novelist; published Murderer (1808) with Minerva
- Louise Marguerite Brayer de Saint-Léon?: The Monk of the Grotto (1800) (authorship uncertain)
- Marianne Breton (fl. 1817): The Wife of Fitzalice (1817)
- James Norris Brewer (c. 1777 – 1829): published An Old Family Legend (1811) and four other novels with Minerva
- Samuel Edgerton Bridges
- John Bristed (fl. 1806): author of Edward and Anna (1806)
- Charles Brockden Brown (1771–1810): prolific author who published at least five novels with Minerva
- Miss Broderick (fl. 1818): author of The Cumberland Cottager (1818)
- Elizabeth Cullen Brown (fl. 1819): author of The Sisters of St Gotherd (1819)
- Maria Elizabeth Budden (née Halsey, c. 1780 – 1832): published two novels with Minerva
- Mrs Bullock (fl. 1795): author of Susanna; or, Traits of a Modern Miss (1795)
- Anne Burke (fl. 1780-1805): author of six novels and a comic opera; published The Secret of the Cavern (1805) with Minerva
- Medora Gordon Byron (fl. 1808–1816): prolific author who published eight titles with Minerva

== C ==
- Lady Mary C. (fl. 1797): "a young lady aged seventeen, i.e., Lady Mary C---r"
- Dorothea Primrose Campbell (1793–1863): poet; author of one novel, Harley Radington: A Tale (1821)
- John Canton (fl. 1803–1807): published Alvar and Seraphina (1804) with Minerva
- David Carey (1784–1824): novelist, poet, and travel writer
- Anthony Carlisle (1768–1840): surgeon, co-discoverer of electrolysis, and possibly the author of The Horrors of Oakendale Abbey (1797) under the pseudonym "Mrs Carver."
- Mrs Carver (fl. 1797–1800): author of four novels; possibly a pseudonym for surgeon Anthony Carlisle.
- Mary Charlton (fl. 1794–1824): prolific author who published a dozen novels and translations with Minerva
- Emily Clark (fl. 1798–1833): published at least four novels — two of them with Minerva — as well as tales and poems
- Mrs Colpoys (fl. 1801): author of The Irish Excursion (1801)
- Cordelia (pseud.?; fl. 1820): author of Dacresfield (1820)
- Sophie Ristaud Cottin: French author whose Elizabeth was translated by Elizabeth Meeke and published by Minerva in 1807.
- Helen Craik (c. 1751 – 1825): published four novels with Minerva, anonymously
- Augustus Jacob Crandolph (fl. 1811): author of The Mysterious Hand, or, Subterranean Horrours! (1811)
- Mary Champion de Crespigny (née Clarke; c. 1749 – 1812): author of conduct literature and one novel, The Pavilion (1796), published with Minerva
- Mrs Croffts (fl. 1798–1801): published two novels with Minerva
- Margaret Cullen (fl. 1803–1814): author of Home (1803) and Mornton (1814)
- T. J. Horsley Curties (fl. 1799–1807): published at least three novels with Minerva, including Ethelwina (1799)
- Catherine Cuthbertson (fl. 1803–1830): author of seven novels

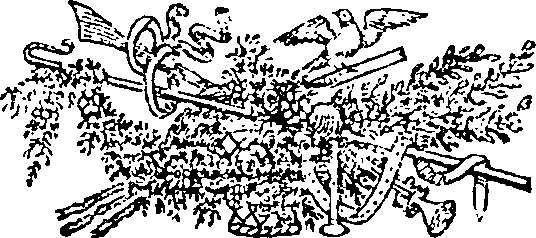
Fleuron (ornamental typography) used by Minerva Press for Sarah Draper's The Princess of Zell (1796)

== D ==
- Robert Charles Dallas (1754–1824): author of four novels
- Azilé D'Arcy (fl. 1817): author of Prejudice (1817)
- Frances D'Aubigne (fl. 1819): author of The Express (1819)
- Selina Davenport (1779–1859): published eleven novels, seven with Minerva
- Eugenia De Acton (fl. 1803–1810): published three novels, as well as conduct literature
- Pierre Jean Baptiste Choudard Desforges (1746–1806): French writer; author of Eugene and Eugenia (1805)
- Emma De Lisle (Parker; fl. 1810–1817): published eight novels
- Sarah Draper (fl. 1796): author of The Memoirs of the Princess of Zell (1796)
- François Guillaume Ducray-Duminil (1761–1819): prolific French novelist and playwright whose work was frequently translated into English. Minerva published four titles.
- Francis Dudley (fl. 1810): author of Amoroso (1810)
- Lady Dunn (fl. 1814)

== E ==
- Felix Ellia (fl. 1799): author of Norman Banditti (1799)
- Jane Elson (fl. 1800–1802): published two novels with Minerva
- John English (fl. 1810): author of The Grey Friar (1810)
- Alicia Margaret Ennis (fl. 1820): author of The Contested Election (1820)
- Robert Evans (fl. 1801): published one novel with Minerva

== F ==
- James Holroyd Fielding (fl. 1817): published one title with Minerva
- Eliza Fenwick (1767–1840): Mainly a children's author, Fenwick wrote one novel for adults: Secresy; or the Ruin on the Rock (1795)
- Lawrence Flammenberg (pseud. of Karl Friedrich Kahlert): author of The Necromancer; or, The Tale of the Black Forest (1794)
- E. M. Foster (fl. 1795–1797): published fourteen novels, five of them with Minerva
- Joseph Fox, Jr (fl. 1791–1810): published three novels
- Sophia L. Frances (fl. 1806–1809): published at least five novels, three with Minerva. Her work was formerly attributed to Francis Lathom.

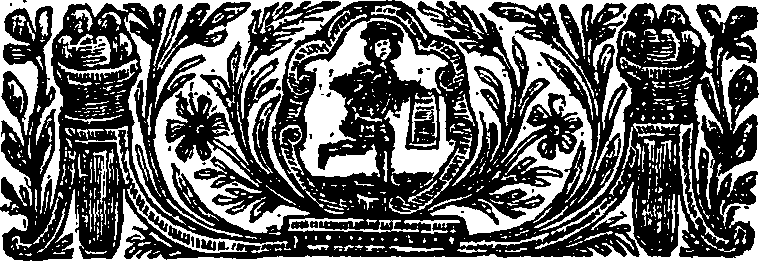
Fleuron (ornamental typography) used by W. Lane for Oliver Goldsmith's The Bee, a select collection of essays (1790)

== G ==
- Stéphanie Félicité, comtesse de Genlis (1746–1830): According to Montague Summers, her novel The Poetical Travels of Eugenius and Antonia was translated from the French by Harriet Jones and published by Minerva in 1820, though only one novel, The Impertinent Wife (1806), is mentioned in British Fiction 1800–1829.
- Sarah Green (fl. 1790–1825): published seventeen, possibly eighteen novels, at least six with Minerva; rumours, since discredited, that the name was a pseudonym to hide the gender of the author
- Griffiths ap Griffiths: The Sons of St. David (1816)
- Carl Friedrich August Grosse (1768–1847): author of Der Genius. Aus den Papieren des Marquis C. von G. (Halle, 1791–1795), adapted into English by Peter Will as Horrid Mysteries (1796), one of the seven "horrid novels" mentioned in Jane Austen's Northanger Abbey.
- Susannah Gunning (née Minifie; 1740–1800): published with Minerva later in her career. There remains some confusion as to the authorship of some titles between Minifie and her sister and sometime collaborator, Margaret Minifie.

== H ==
- E.H.H. (fl. 1819): author of The Highlander (1819)
- Agnes C. Hall (pseud Rosalia St. Clair; née Scott; 1777–1846): novelist and translator with over a dozen titles published under pseud Rosalia St. Clair
- Mary Ann Hanway (fl. 1776–1814): travel writer and novelist who published at least two titles with Minerva
- Martha Harley (later Hugill; fl. 1786–1797): author of at least six novels
- Catherine Harris (fl. 1800): author of Edwardina (1800)
- William Hart
- Jane Harvey (fl. 1802–1828): author of over a dozen novels, five with Minerva, as well as poetry and other works.
- Caroline Harwood (fl. 1810): author of The Castle of Vivaldi (1810)
- H. H. Hasworth (fl. 1802): author of Lady of the Cave (1802)
- Ann Julia Hatton (pseud "Ann of Swansea"; née Kemble, then Curtis; 1764–1838): Between 1810 and 1831 she published fourteen novels "by no means lacking in quality", at least eleven with Minerva Press.
- C. D. Haynes (later Golland; fl. 1818–1841): four novels with Minerva
- Mary Anne Hedge (fl. 1820–1822): published at least one title with Minerva; author of other novels, poetry, and educational texts
- Elizabeth Helme (died c. 1814): successful and prolific novelist, educational writer, and translator
- J. Hemet (fl. 1802): translator of Odd Enough to Be Sure! (Lafontaine, 1802)
- Elizabeth Hervey (née Marsh; 1748 – c. 1820): author of Melissa and Marcia and six other novels; William Beckford's half sister
- William B. Hewetson (fl. 1808–1809): novelist and translator
- Mary Hill (fl. 1809–1813): author of Anselmo; or, The Day of Trial (1813)
- Augusta Ann Hirst (fl. 1807): author of Helen; or, Domestic Occurrences (1807)
- Barbara Hofland (née Wreakes; then Hoole; 1770–1844): author of sixty-six or so works, eight with Minerva
- Mr Holder (fl. 1798): author of Secluded Man (1798)
- Margaret Holford (1757–1834): her works are sometimes confused with those of her daughter Margaret Holford. Both authors published anonymously.
- Margaret Holford (later Hobson; 1778–1852): her works are sometimes confused with those of her mother Margaret Holford. Both authors published anonymously.
- Anthony Frederick Holstein (pseud.; fl. 1808–1815): published at least ten novels with Minerva
- Prudentia Homespun (pseud. for Jane West)
- Sarah Anne Hook (fl. 1802–1804): author of Secret Machinations (1804) and at least one other title
- Mary Houghton (fl. 1810–1816): author of The Mysteries of the Forest (1810) and The Border Chieftains (1813) as well as poetry
- Miss Howard (fl. 1811): author of Married Life (1811)
- Ann Howell (fl. 1787–1797): author of half a dozen novels
- Anne Rice Hughes (fl. 1784-1795) published four works with William Lane/Minerva.
- Maria Hunter (fl. 1792–1798): author of two novels
- Rachel Hunter: author of The Schoolmistress (1811)
- J. P. Hunt (fl. 1809): author of Iron Mask (1809)

== I ==
- Mrs Iliffe (née Palmer; fl. 1808–1813): author of The Prior Claim (1813); also a poet
- Mrs Issacs (fl. 1801–1820): author of over half a dozen novels, two of which she published with Minerva

== J ==
- Frances Jacson (1754–1842): Jacson published anonymously and there have been questions about attribution. Her first two novels were published with Minerva.
- Mrs Johnson (fl. 1786–1787): author of Juliana (1786) and two other novels.
- Charles Johnston
- Mary Johnston (fl. 1816–1822): author of Lairds of Glenfern (1816)
- E. H. St Pierre Jones (fl. 1827): author of Rockhaven, A Tale of the Thirteenth Century (1827)
- Harriet Jones (fl. 1799–1820): author of two novels; translator of Stéphanie Félicité, comtesse de Genlis from the French
- Juvenis (pseud): Mary and Fanny (1816)

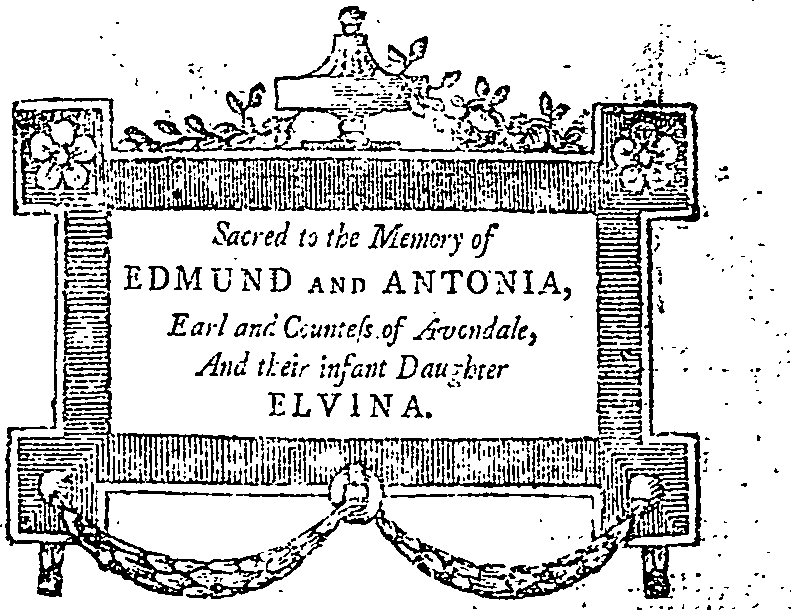
Fleuron (ornamental typography) used by Minerva Press for Isabella Kelly's The Ruins of Avondale Priory (1796)

== K ==
- Karl Friedrich Kahlert (pseuds. Lawrence or Lorenz Flammenberg, Bernhard Stein; fl. 1794): author of The Necromancer; or, The Tale of the Black Forest (1794)
- Mrs Kelly (fl. 1821): The Fatalists (1821) published with Minerva
- Frances Kelly (fl. 1808): author of one novel
- Isabella Kelly (née Fordyce; later Hedgeland; 1759–1857): published ten novels, several with Minerva, as well as poetry and educational writings
- Johanson Kidderslaw: Swedish author whose novel Swedish Mysteries, or Hero of the Mines was translated by Anna Marie MacKenzie and published by Minerva. Montague Summers identifies MacKenzie as the author.
- Sophia King (later Fortnum; born c. 1781): author of five novels, one published with Minerva.

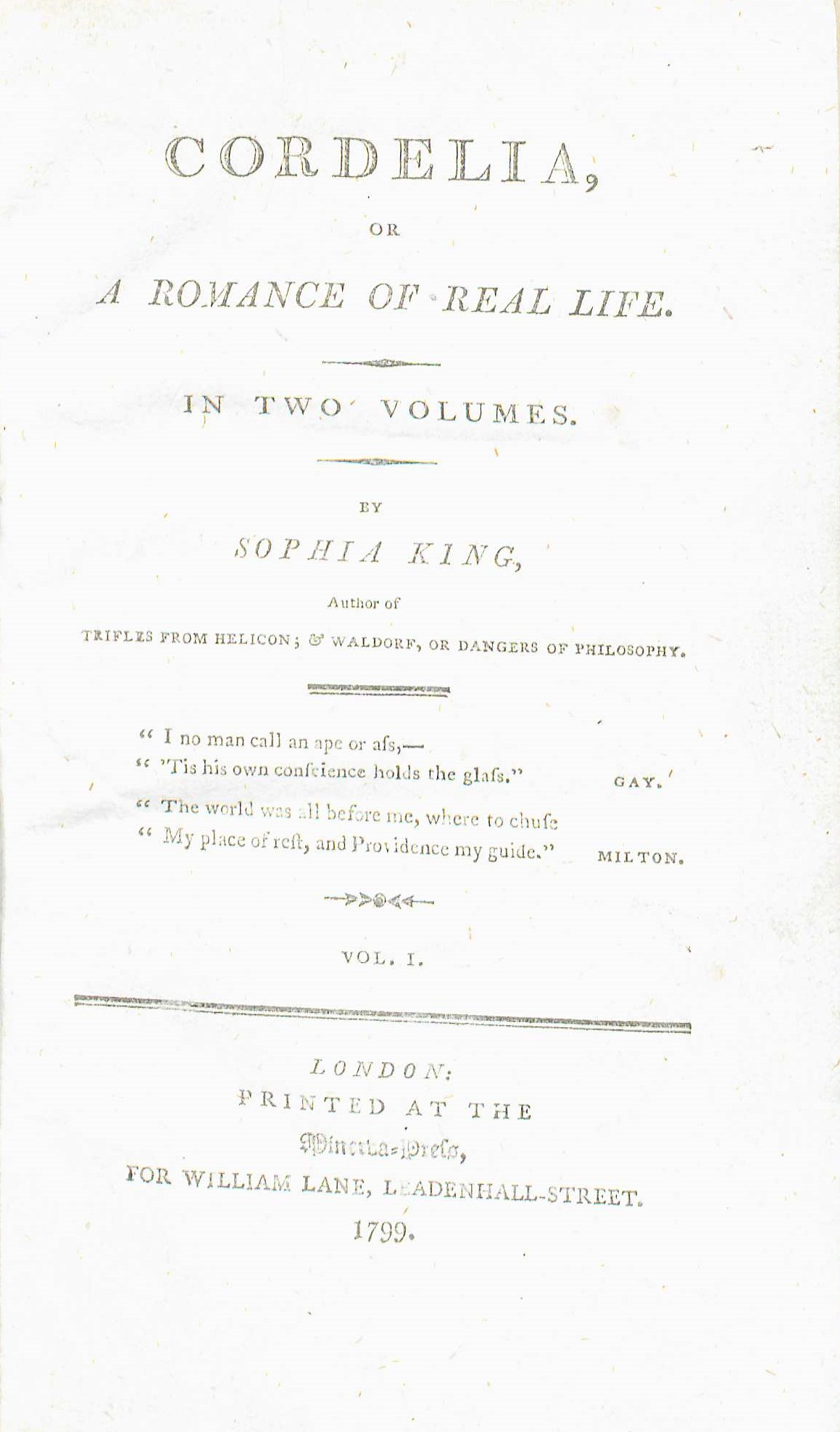
Title page of Sophia King's Cordelia or A Romance of Real Life (Minerva Press, 1799)

== L ==
- C. L.: author of Faux Pas (1800)
- Augustus Heinrich Julius Lafontaine (pseud. Gustaf Freier; 1758–1831): bestselling and highly prolific German novelist; ten titles published by Minerva translated by Mary Charlton, John Hemet, and Elizabeth Meeke
- Agnes Lancaster (fl. 1816): published one novel with Minerva
- Sarah Lansdell (fl. 1796): author of one novel, Manfredi (1796)
- Francis Lathom (1774–1832): Author of The Castle of Ollada (1795), The Impenetrable Secret, Find it Out! (1805), The Mysterious Freebooter (1806), Italian Mysteries (1820), The One-Pound Note (1820), and seven other Minerva titles, Lathom published his first novel when he was seventeen. His The Midnight Bell (1798), published in the second edition by Minerva, was one of the seven "horrid novels" mentioned in Jane Austen's Northanger Abbey.
- Thomas Pike Lathy (born 1771): author of at least four Minerva novels, including Love, Hatred, and Revenge. A Swiss Romance (1809)
- Jemima Layton (formerly Plumptre; fl. 1816–1820): author of two novels
- Michel-Théodore Leclercq (fl. 1800): The Invisible Man (1800)
- Mrs Leslie (fl. 1801–1806): author of two Minerva novels
- Alethea Brereton Lewis (1749–1827): author of two Minerva novels
- William Linley (fl. 1800): author of Forbidden Apartments (1800)
- P. Littlejohn (fl. 1791–1793): author of The Cypher (1791) and Henry (1793)
- George Lipscomb: author of The Grey Friar (1810)
- Mrs Llewwellyn (fl. 1813): author of Read It and Give It a Name (1813)
- Charles Lucas (fl. 1800): author of The Infernal Quixote (1801) and one other Minerva title, other novels, sermons, and poetry
- Mr Lyttleton (fl. 1801–1805): author of Fiasco, Count of Lavagne (1805) and five other novels with Minerva

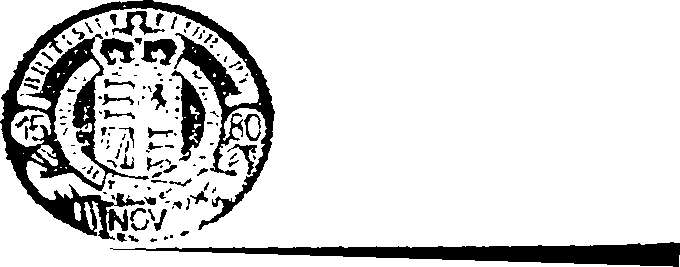
Fleuron (ornamental typography) used by Minerva Press for J. Moser's The Hermit of Caucasus (1796)

== M ==
- Anna Maria Mackenzie (née Wight; previously Cox, then Johnson; pseud. Ellen of Exeter; fl. 1782-1811): prolific novelist and translator who published at least two titles with Minerva
- Miriam Malden: published Hope (1813) with Minerva
- Mrs Martin (fl. 1798–1830): published at least two novels with Minerva
- Richard Mathew (fl. 1814): one title with Minerva
- Eliza Kirkham Mathews (née Kirkham Strong; 1772–1802): A prolific writer with over twenty publications, there have been attribution issues with some of her work. At least one title published with Minerva
- Charlotte Matthew (fl. 1793–1807): author of Introspection (1801), three other novels, and poems
- Richard Matthews (fl. 1814): one title
- Caroline Maxwell (fl. 1808–1828): one title with Minerva
- Elizabeth Meeke (1761–1826): published as "Gabrielli" (pseud.) or "Mrs Meeke"; identity in question until 2013; also did translations from French; highly prolific.
- Theodore Melville (fl. 1803–1809): author of Irish Chieftain (1809)
- Alicia M'Gennis (fl. 1817): one title with Minerva
- Anna Millikin (1764– after 1849): published Rival Chiefs (1805) with Minerva
- Margaret Minifie (1734–1803): there remains some confusion as to the authorship of some titles between Minifie and her sister, and sometime collaborator, Susannah Gunning
- Edward Montague (fl. 1805–1808): author of The Castle of Berry Pomeroy (1806)
- Edward Moore (fl. 1811–1817): two titles with Minerva
- Marianne Moore (fl. 1802–1803): author of Lascelles (1802) and at least one other title
- Joseph Moser (1748–1814): dramatist and novelist
- Henrietta Mosse (née Rouvière; d. 1835): published most of her novels with Minerva
- Agnes Musgrave (fl. 1795–1808): author of at least five novels

== N ==
- Edward Nares (1762–1841): author of Thinks I to Myself (1811) and I Says, Says I (1812)
- Eliza Nathan (fl. 1822): author of two titles
- Christiane Benedicte Eugenie Naubert (fl. 1803): one title with Minerva, Walter de Monbary
- Mr Nicholson (fl. 1787–1789): author of Orlando and Seraphina (1787) and at least three other titles

== O ==
- Orlando (pseud; fl. 1807–1809): author of A Summer By the Sea (1807) and The Chamber of Death (1809)

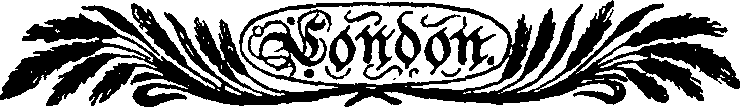
Fleuron (ornamental typography) used by Minerva Press for Eliza Parsons' The Girl of the Mountains (1797)

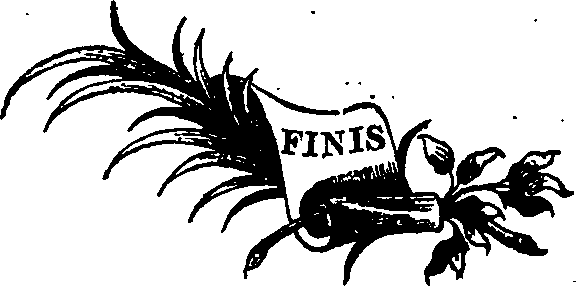
Fleuron (ornamental typography) used by Minerva Press for Bell [Annabella] Plumptre's Montgomery (1796)

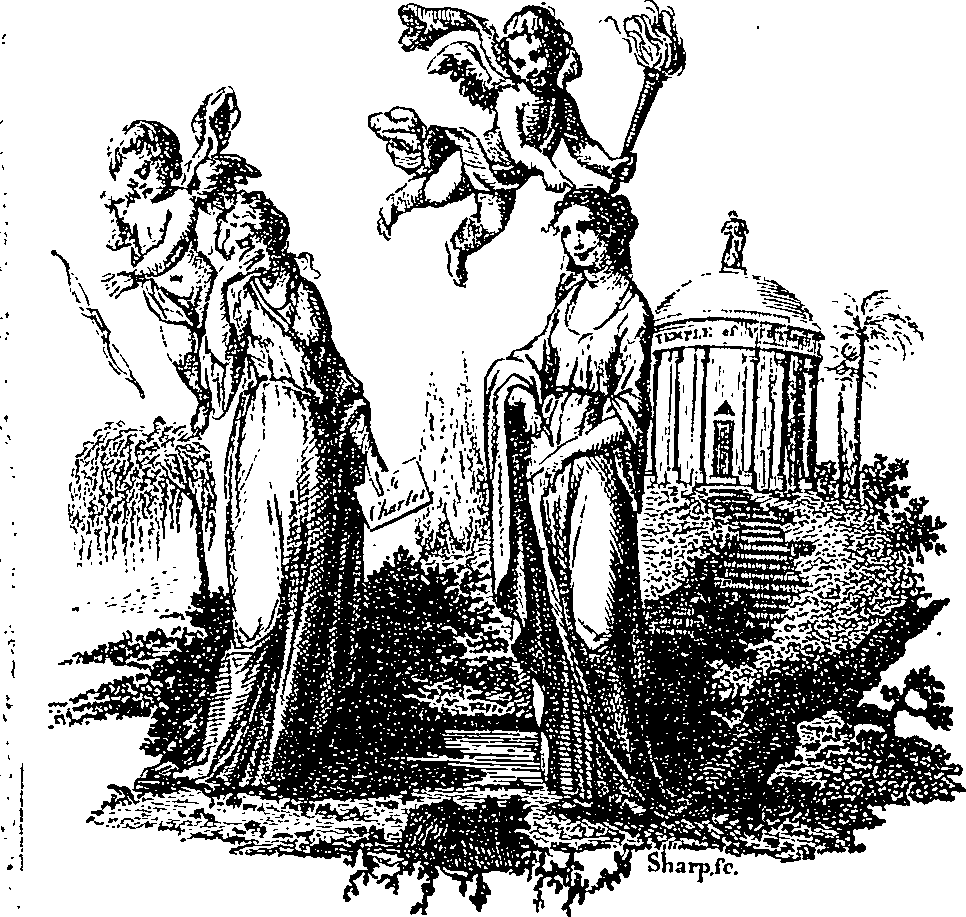
Fleuron (ornamental typography) used by W. Lane for Samuel Jackson Pratt's Charles and Charlotte (1777)

== P ==
- F. H. P.: author of The Castle of Caithness (1802)
- John Palmer, Jr (1776–1809): author of The Mystery of the Black Tower (1796) and half a dozen other titles
- Emma Parker (Emma de Lisle, pseud.; fl. 1809–1817): some attribution issues when her pseudonym used to publish another's novels. Two titles
- Mary Elizabeth Parker (fl. 1795–1802)
- Eliza Parsons (née Phelp; 1739–1811): author of Castle of Wolfenbach (1793) and The Mysterious Warning, a German Tale (1796), two of the seven "horrid novels" mentioned in Jane Austen's Northanger Abbey. Between 1790 and 1807, she wrote 19 novels and one play.
- Mrs F. C. Patrick (fl. 1797–1799): author of at least three novels
- D. W. Paynter (fl. 1819): author of one novel
- Frances Peck (fl. 1807–1818): author of Maid of Avon (1807) and The Welch Peasant Boy (1808)
- Janetta Philipps (fl. 1802–1811): one title
- Mrs Lucius Phillips (fl. 1797): author of Heaven's Best Gift (1797)
- Charles-Antoine-Guillaume Pigault De L'Epiney Lebrun (1753–1835): prolific French author who published all but one of the English translations of his novels with Minerva
- Mary Pilkington (née Hopkins; 1761–1839): published over forty works, several with Minerva, Gothic novels but also many texts for children
- Annabella Plumptre (1769 – 1838): translator for at least one Minerva title; sister of Anne Plumptre
- Anne Plumptre (1760–1818): novelist, translator, travel writer, sister of Annabella Plumptre
- Anna Maria Porter (1780–1832): prolific author of Octavia (1804)
- Mr. Potter (fl. 1790): Frederic; or, The Libertine (1790)
- Samuel Jackson Pratt (pseud. Courtney Melmoth; 1749–1814): prolific scandal-ridden former clergyman and author of Charles and Charlotte (1777)
- Mrs Purcell (fl. 1820): author of The Orientalist (1820)

== R ==
- Mary Ann Radcliffe (1746–1818): feminist author. Her authorship of several Minerva titles has been questioned. Minerva would seem to have exploited the similarity of her name to that of bestselling author Ann Radcliffe.
- Eliza Ratcliffe (fl. 1808): author of The Mysterious Baron (1808)
- Mrs Ravson: author of Mentoria
- Jean Baptiste Joseph Innocent Philadelphe Regnault-Warin (1775–1844): French writer who published translations with Minerva; sometimes wrote as Saint-Edmé
- Mrs. Rice (fl. 1803–1807): author of The Deserted Wife (1803) and Monteith (1806)
- John Robinson (fl. 1794–1806): author "remarkable for the murderous catastrophe of his pieces"
- Maria Elizabeth Robinson (1775–1818): author of The Shrine of Bertha (1794), an epistolary novel
- Mary Robinson (1758–1800)
- Regina Maria Roche (née Dalton; 1764–1845): bestselling author of at least sixteen novels, including Clermont (1798), one of the seven "horrid novels" mentioned in Jane Austen's Northanger Abbey.
- John Benjamin Rogers (fl. 1816): author of The Days of Harold, a Metrical Tale (1816)
- Mrs Ross (fl. 1811–1817): author of seven Minerva titles
- Susanna Rowson (née Haswell; 1762–1824): prolific Anglo-American novelist, dramatist, and poet

== S ==
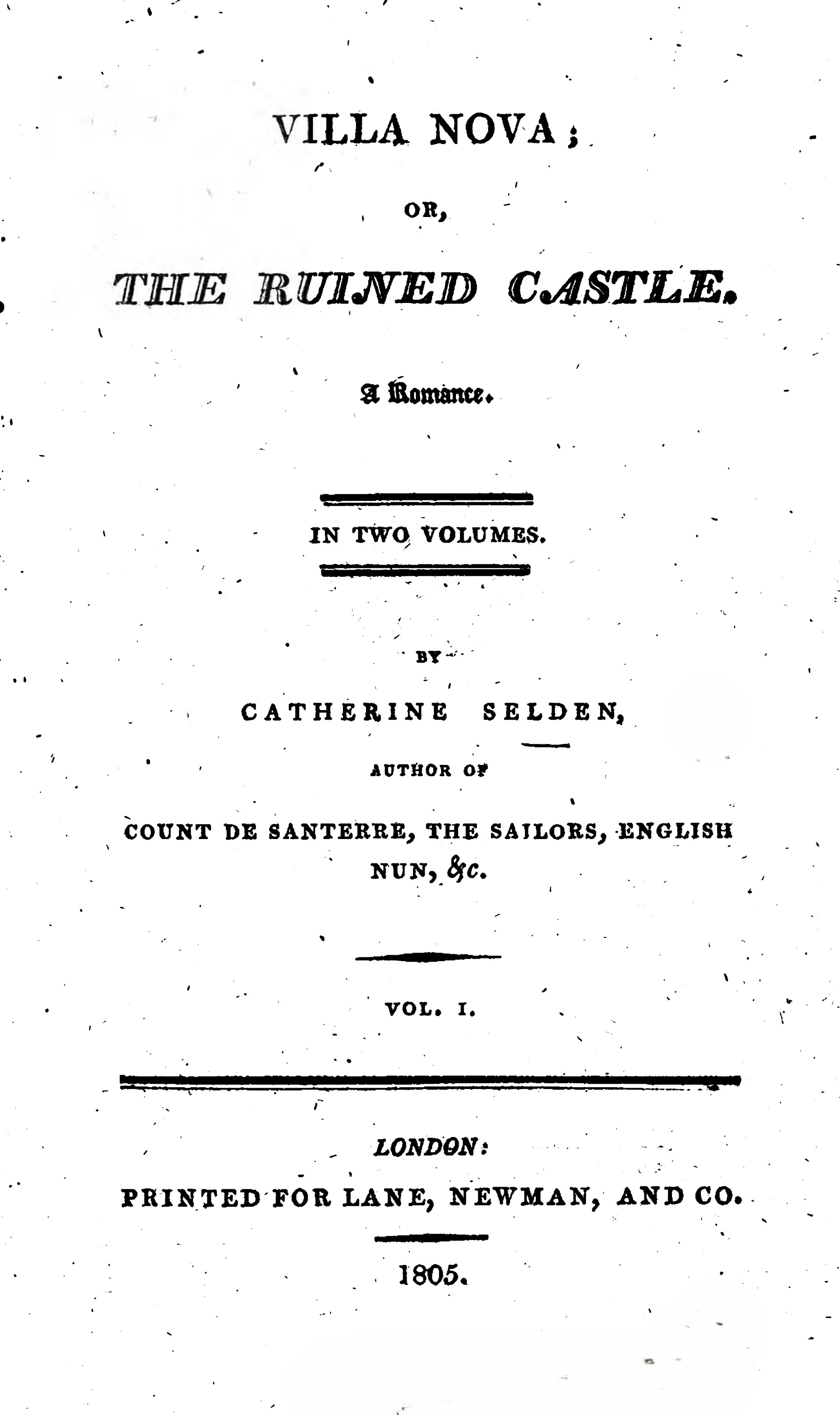
Title page of Catharine Selden's Villa Nova; or, The Ruined Castle (Minerva Press, 1805)

- "R. S." (pseud, possibly Richard Sickelmore): author of The New Monk (1798), a satire of M. G. Lewis's The Monk (1796) "even more grotesque and shocking" than the original.
- "Sabina" (pseud) (fl. 1790)
- Elizabeth Sandham (fl. 1789–1819): author of Lucilla (1819) and two other novels
- Caroline Scott (fl. 1816): author of Hermione (1816)
- Paul Sebright (fl. 1820–1824): two titles
- Catharine Selden (fl. 1797–1817): author of seven novels
- Sewrin (pseud. Charles-Augustin Bassompierre; 1771–1853): Minerva published translations of several title from this French author
- Sarah Sheriffe (fl. 1800–1803): at least three Minerva titles
- Mary Martha Sherwood (née Butt; 1775–1851)
- Mrs Showes (fl. 1797-1806): translator
- Richard Sickelmore, Jun. (fl. 1796–1809): novelist, dramatist, author of Edgar; or, The Phantom of the Castle (1798) and at least one other Minerva title
- Henry Siddons (1774–1815): actor and author of Reginald De Torby and the Twelve Robbers (1803)
- Mr Singer (fl. 1796–1803): author of The Wanderer of the Alps (1796) and at least one other title
- Eleanor Sleath (1770–1847): author of half a dozen novels including The Orphan of the Rhine (1798), one of the seven "horrid novels" mentioned in Jane Austen's Northanger Abbey.
- Catherina Smith (fl. 1807–1817): actress and author of five novels including Barozzi; or, The Venetian Sorceress (1815) and The Caledonian Bandit (1811)
- Maria Lavinia Smith (fl. 1801): author of The Fugitive of the Forest (1801)
- Arthur Spenser (fl. 1819): author of Iskander (1819)
- Christian Heinrich Spiess (1755–1799): German author whose novel The Mountain Cottager was translated by Annabella Plumptre and published by Minerva. At least one other of his works was published by the press.
- Rosalia St. Clair (pseud of Agnes C. Hall, née Scott; 1777–1846): novelist and translator with over a dozen titles
- Louisa Sidney Stanhope (fl. 1806–1827): novelist with over a dozen titles with Minerva
- Jemima Maria Stratton (fl. 1794): author of Maid of the Castle (1794)
- Miss Street (fl. 1790–1793): author of three novels
- Elizabeth Strutt (1782–1867): also wrote as Elizabeth Byron; author of at least four novels, the first two of which were published by Minerva
- Augusta Amelia Stuart (fl. 1808–1812): author of at least three novels, one with Minerva
- Henry Summersett (fl. 1794–1805): author of eight novels, including Mad Man of the Mountain (1799) and Leopold Warndorf (1800)
- Alexander Sutherland (fl. 1819–1831): author of Redmound the Rebel (1819) and several other titles
- Henrietta Sykes (fl. 1800–1815): author of Margiana (1808) and at least two other Minerva novels, as well as poetry and hymns

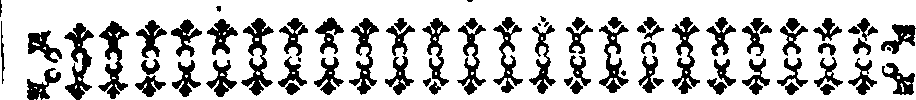
Fleuron (ornamental typography) used by W. Lane for Margaret Taylor's Mrs Taylor's Family Companion (1795)

== T ==
- Miss Taylor (fl. 1799–1806): author of six novels, five published by Minerva
- Eliza Taylor (fl. 1817–1820): published one novel with Minerva
- Margaret Taylor (fl. 1795)
- Peter Teuthold (pseud. of Peter Will): translator of Lawrence Flammenberg's The Necromancer; or, The Tale of the Black Forest (1794)
- Elizabeth Thomas (née Wolferstan; 1770/71–1855): Thomas has been identified as "Mrs Bridget Bluemantle", author of at least nine Minerva Press novels from 1806 to 1818, though this identification remains problematic.
- Anna (Harriet?) Thompson (fl. 1787–1807): one title with Minerva
- James Thompson (fl. 1803): one title
- T. R. Tuckett (fl. 1814): one title
- Richard Twiss (1747–1821): travel writer who published one title with Minerva

== V ==
- Horace Vere (pseud; fl. 1809): one title

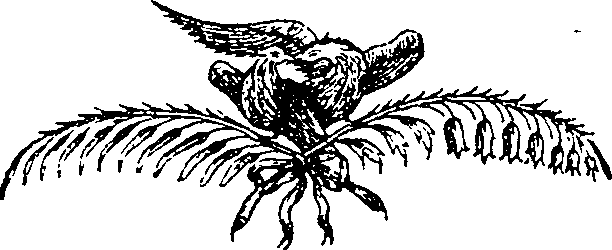
Fleuron (ornamental typography) used by Minerva Press for [Anon.], Augusta Denbeigh; a novel (1795)

== W ==
- George Walker (1772–1847): novelist and poet; author of The House of Tynian (1795)
- Catherine G. Ward (later Mason; born 1787): prolific and often-pirated author who published at least three titles with Minerva
- Caroline Matilda Warren (fl. 1806): one title
- Jane West (pseud. Prudentia Homespun; 1758–1852): prolific writer in a variety of genres
- T. H. White
- Henry Whitfield (fl. 1791–1816): author of Leopold; or, The Bastard (1804) and half a dozen other titles
- Sarah Scudgell Wilkinson (1779–1831): prolific author who frequently published in chapbook format
- Peter Will (under the pseud. Peter Teuthold; fl. 1795–1811): translator of Lawrence Flammenberg's The Necromancer; or, The Tale of the Black Forest (1794) and others
- William Frederick Williams (fl. 1803–1805): at least four titles with Minerva
- Caroline von Wolzogen (née von Lengefeld) (1763–1847): German author whose novel Agnes de Lilien was translated by Mrs Showes and published by Minerva.
- Elizabeth Wright (fl. 1801): author of A Marvellous Pleasant Love Story (1801)

== Y ==
- Mrs Yeates (fl. 1800): one novel, Eliza (1800)
- Mrs R. P. M. Yorke (fl. 1800–1805)
- Mary Julia Young (fl. 1788–1810)

== Z ==
- Sophia S. Ziegenhirt (fl. 1807–1816): author of educational texts and at least one novel, Orphan of Tintern Abbey (1816)

== See also ==
- Mothers of the Novel: 100 Good Women Writers Before Jane Austen
- List of biographical dictionaries of women writers in English
- List of early-modern British women novelists
- List of women writers
- Lists of writers
- Women Writers Project
- Women's writing (literary category)

== Resources ==
- Blain, Virginia, et al., eds. The Feminist Companion to Literature in English. New Haven and London: Yale UP, 1990. (Internet Archive)
- Buck, Claire, ed.The Bloomsbury Guide to Women's Literature. Prentice Hall, 1992. (Internet Archive)
- Corman, Brian. Women Novelists Before Jane Austen: The Critics and Their Canons. University of Toronto Press, 2008. (ISBN 9781442689633 doi:10.3138/9781442689633)
- Oxford Dictionary of National Biography. Oxford: OUP, 2004.
- Robertson, Fiona, ed. Women's Writing, 1778–1838. Oxford: OUP, 2001. (Internet Archive)
- Schellenberg, Betty A. The Professionalization of Women Writers in Eighteenth-Century Britain. Cambridge University Press, 2005. ISBN 9780511597633 doi:10.1017/CBO9780511597633.
- Schlueter, Paul, and June Schlueter. An encyclopedia of British women writers. Rutgers University Press, 1998. ISBN 9780813525426
- Spencer, Jane. The Rise of the Woman Novelist: From Aphra Behn to Jane Austen. 1986.
- Spender, Dale. Mothers of the novel: 100 good women writers before Jane Austen. London/NY:Pandora, 1986. (Internet Archive)
- Summers, Montague. A Gothic Bibliography (1941; available online at Internet Archive).
- Todd, Janet, ed. British Women Writers: a critical reference guide. London: Routledge, 1989. (Internet Archive)
