= Anna Maria Mackenzie =

British Gothic novelist

- Born: Anna Maria Wight
- Occupation: Author
- Spouse(s): Cox; Johnson; Mackenzie
- Writing career
- Pen name: Ellen of Exeter
- Language: English
- Years active: 1783–1811
- Notable works: Monmouth: A Tale, 1790

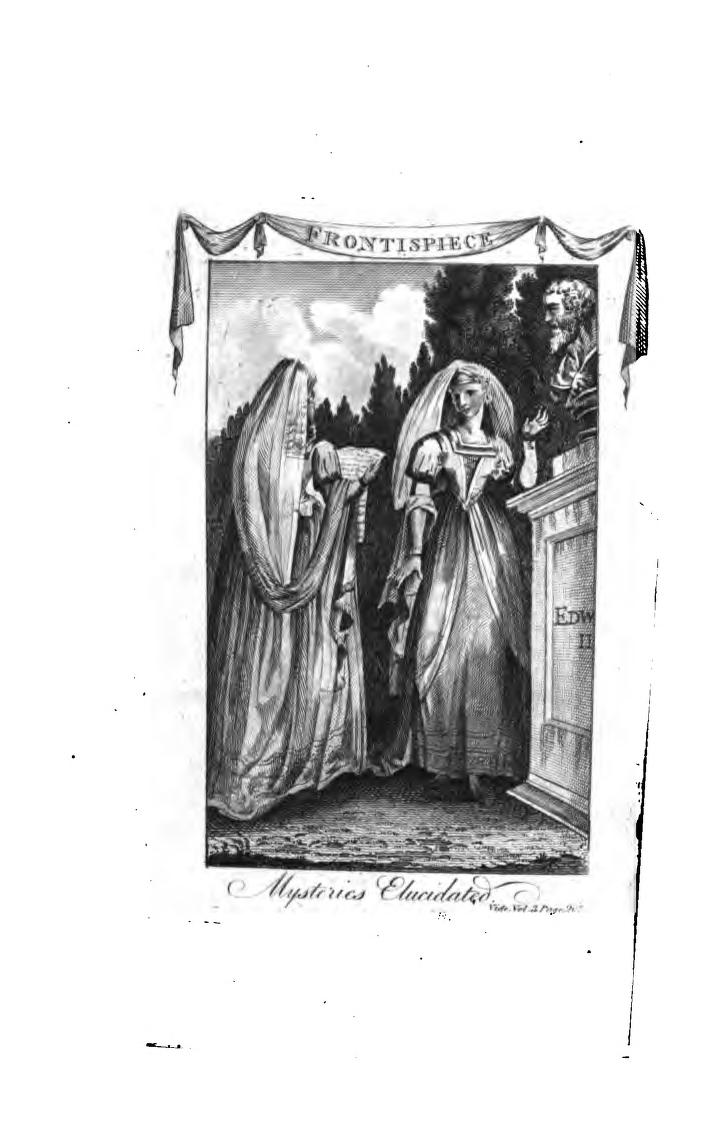
Frontispiece of Anna Maria Mackenzie's Mysteries Elucidated: A Novel. Vol. I. London: Minerva Press, 1795.

Anna Maria Mackenzie (fl. 1783–1811) was a prolific author of popular novels active during the late eighteenth and early nineteenth centuries. She was closely associated with the Minerva Press.

== Life ==
Anna Maria Wight was the daughter of a coal merchant in Essex; little more is known of her early life or antecedents. She married a man named Cox who died and left her with four children and financially dependent on relatives. She worked at a women's boarding school as an assistant, then turned to writing full time. Judging by her publishing history, by 1789 she was remarried, to a man named Johnson, and by 1795 she was publishing as Mrs. Mackenzie, presumably the name of a third (and final) husband.

== Writing ==
Anna Maria Mackenzie provides the bibliographer with a challenge, as she published anonymously, as well as under a pseudonym, and also under each of her three married names. This may be why many accounts of her career contain some variation of the phrase that she wrote "at least" sixteen novels: there are sixteen that are reasonably certain but she may have written more. There were also, apparently, newspaper pieces published early on. It was as a novelist, however, that she built her career. Reviewers of her novels "were usually kind to her" and her novels were routinely pirated. She published much of her work for William Lane, founder of the successful Minerva Press and proprietor of the Lane Circulating Library, and her own work was responsive to trends in popular taste. Her first major work, Burton Wood (1783), was a sentimental epistolary novel; many of her works contained Gothic and sensational elements; later she turned to historical fiction with Monmouth (1790); Danish Massacre (1791), set in early medieval times; and Mysteries Elucidated (1795), set in the fourteenth century. As one commentator has it, "her career exemplifies almost every trend of the period."

== Works ==
=== Novels ===
- Burton-Wood. In a series of letters. By a lady. London: printed for the author, by H.D. Steel, no. 51, Lothbury, near Coleman street. And sold by W. Flexney, bookseller, Holborn. 1783.
- The gamesters: a novel. In three volumes. By the authoress of Burton-Wood and Joseph. London: printed by H. D. Steel, No. 51, Lothbury, and sold by R. Baldwin, No. 47, Pater-Noster-Row, 1786.
- Retribution: a novel. By the author of the Gamesters, &c. In three volumes. London: printed by G.G.J. and J. Robinson, 1788.
- Calista; A novel. In two volumes. By Mrs. Johnson, author of Retribution, The gamesters, &c. London: printed for W. Lane, Leadenhall-Street, 1789.
- Monmouth: a tale, founded on historic facts. Inscribed to his grace the Duke of Buccleugh. By Anna Maria Johnson, author of Calista, a novel, &c. in three volumes. London: printed for W. Lane, Leadenhall-Street, 1790.
- Danish massacre: an historic fact. By the author of Monmouth, a tale. In two volumes. London: printed for William Lane, at the Minerva Press, Leadenhall-Street, 1791.
- Slavery: or, the times. In two volumes. By the author of Monmouth, The Danish massacre, &c. London: printed for G. G. J. and J. Robinsons; and J. Dennis, 1792.
- Orlando and Lavinia. Or, the Libertine. a Novel. in Four Volumes. by a Lady. printed for L. Wayland, No. 2, Middle-Row, Holborn, 1792.
- Mysteries elucidated, a novel. In three volumes. By the author of Danish massacre, Monmouth, &c. London: printed for William Lane, at the Minerva Press, Leadenhall-Street, 1795.
- The neapolitan; or, the test of integrity. a novel. In three volumes. By Ellen of Exeter. London: printed for William Lane, at the Minerva-Press, Leadenhall-Street, 1796.
- Dusseldorf; or, the fratricide. A romance. In three volumes. By Anna Maria Mackenzie. London: printed at the Minerva-Press, for William Lane, Leadenhall-Street, 1798.
- Feudal events, or, days of yore. An ancient story. In two volumes. By Anna Maria Mackenzie, Author of Neapolitan, Dusseldory, &c. &c. London: printed at the Minerva-Press, for William Lane, Leadenhall-Street, 1800.
- Swedish Mysteries, or Hero of the Mines. A Tale. In three volumes. Translated from a Swedish Manuscript, by Johanson Kidderslaw, formerly master of the English Grammar School at Upsal. London: Printed at the Minerva-Press, for William Lane, Leadenhall-Street, 1801.
- Martin & Mansfeldt, or the Romance of Franconia. In Three Volumes. By Anna Maria Mackenzie, author of Mysteries Elucidated, Feudal Events, &c. London: Printed at the Minerva-Press, for Lane and Newman, Leadenhall-Street, 1802.
- The Irish Guardian, or, Errors of Eccentricity. In Three Volumes. By Mrs. Mackenzie. London: Printed for Longman, Hurst, Rees, and Orme, 39, Paternoster-Row, 1809.
- Almeria D'Aveiro; or, The Irish Guardian. A Novel. In Three Volumes. By Mrs. Mackenzie, author of Mysteries Elucidated; Feudal Events; Martin and Mansfeldt; Dusseldorf; Neapolitan, &c. &c. London: Printed at the Minerva-Press, for A. K. Newman and Co. (Successors to Lane, Newman, & Co.), 1811.

=== Religious ===
- Joseph. In five books. By A. M. Cox. London: printed for the author; by H. D. Steel, No. 51, Lothbury, near Coleman-Street, and sold by the following booksellers: Mr. Dodsley, Pall-Mall; Mr. Flexney; Holborn; and Mr. Fielding, Pater-Noster-Row, 1783: a religious text published by subscription under her first married name

== Etexts ==
- Joseph. 1783: available at Google Books
- Retribution. 1788: available at Google Books: Vol. I, II, III
- Monmouth. 1790: PDF, Chawton House
- Danish massacre. 1791: available at Google Books: Vol. I, II
- Mysteries elucidated. 1795: available at the Internet Archive: Vol. I, II, III.
- Dusseldorf. 1798: available at Google Books: Vol. I, II, III
- Feudal events. 1800: available at Google Books: Vol. I, II
- The Irish Guardian. 1809: PDF, Chawton House

== See also ==
- Circulating library
- List of Minerva Press authors
- Minerva Press
- William Lane
