= Medora Gordon Byron =

British Romantic novelist (c. 1782–1858)

- Born: c. 1782
- Died: 16 September 1858 (aged 76)
- Occupation: novelist
- Writing career
- Pen name: Miss Byron; A Modern Antique
- Language: English
- Years active: 1808–1816
- Period: Romantic
- Literary movement: Gothic

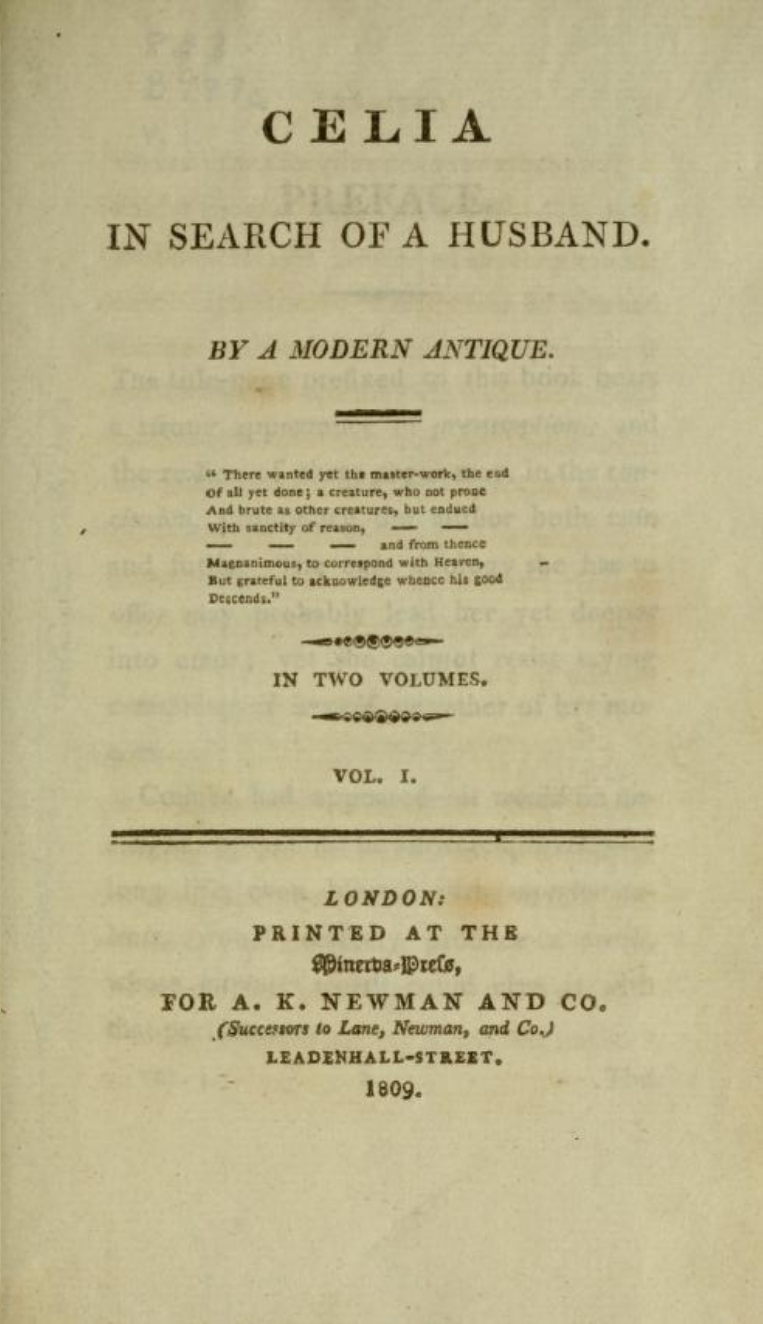
Title page of Celia in search of a husband by "A Modern Antique", 1809

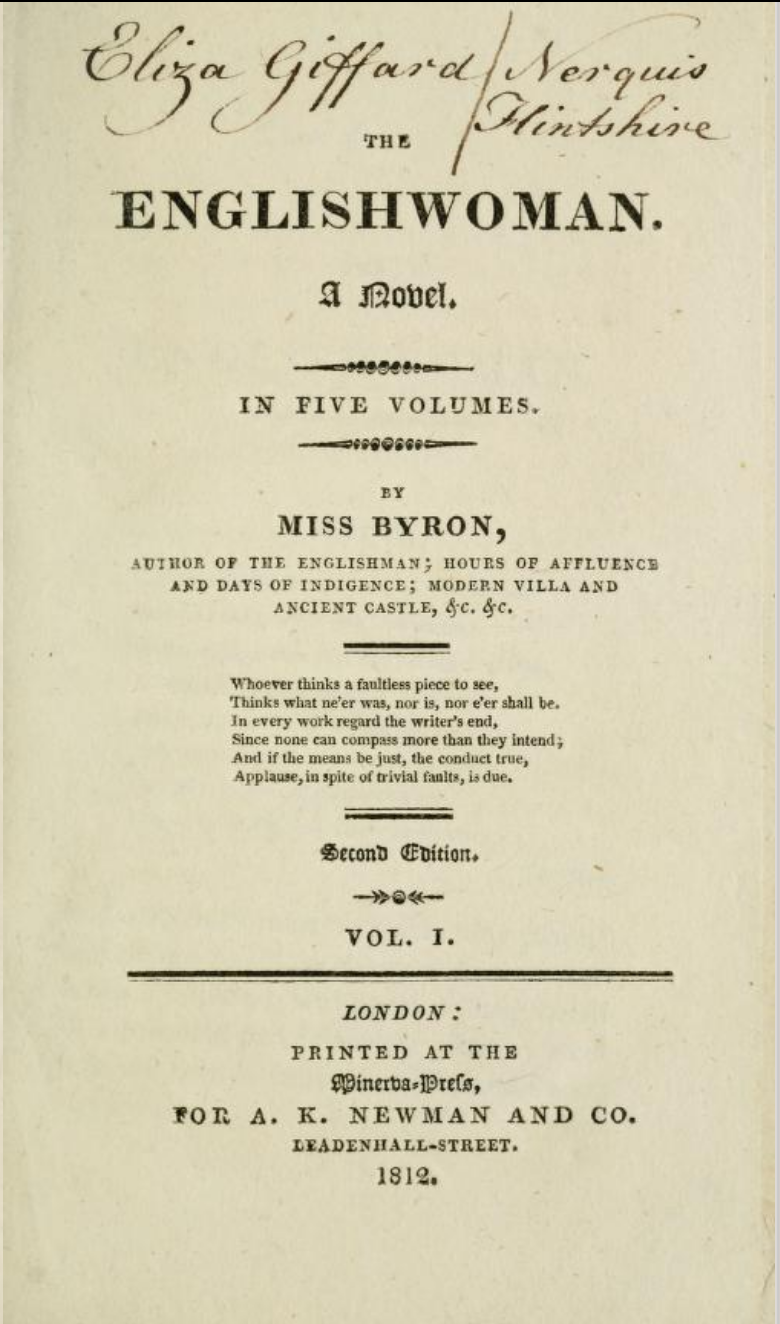
Title page of The Englishwoman. A novel (Vol. I) by Miss Byron, 1812.

Medora Gordon Byron (c. 1782 – 1858) has long been accepted as the pseudonym of "Miss Byron," a Romantic-era author of either five or eight novels, though recent scholarship has complicated that identification.

== Life ==
Nothing is known of Medora Gordon Byron. She has been tentatively, but not conclusively, identified as Julia Maria Byron (1782–1858), a cousin of George Gordon Byron. There are two sets of novels which have been traditionally attributed to Medora Gordon Byron, five published under the name "Miss Byron" and three under the pseudonym "A Modern Antique." Both groups of novels were brought out by the Minerva Press, a highly successful London publisher of Gothic, sensation, and other popular genres. Susan Brown and her associates write that "[b]oth strings of fiction are exclamatory in style, interested in domesticity, and latterly in the unmarried (both men and women), given sometimes to commentary on novel-writing." Some twenty-first century experts maintain that it is unlikely that the same person authored both series, but Caroline Franklin, the editor of the only modern edition of this author's work, considers Julia Byron to be "a distinct possibility" for the author of all eight novels.

An author by the same name was credited with a musical melodrama in 1834, as well as a poem, though critics maintain that this cannot be the same person.

One of the eight novels—Celia in Search of a Husband—is available in a modern edition, one of the Chawton House Library series of Women's Novels. Three others are freely accessible in digitized versions and others are available by paid license. A critic who has written about The English-Woman, the earliest of Byron's publications, characterizes the writing in that novel as "mediocre," though the fact that it went into a second edition would indicate at least a modest level of success. The "Modern Antique" persona has been described as conservative and a moralist, yet also as the author of the "high-spirited and entertaining ... anti-Jacobin" Celia in Search of a Husband. The literary quality is not what interests recent scholars, however, but rather Byron's role as a professional woman writer, such as her use of "multiple authorial identities," a strategy she shared with Ann Hatton and Elizabeth Meeke, both of whom also published with Minerva.

== Works ==
=== By "Miss Byron" ===
- The English-Woman. A Novel. In Five Volumes. By Miss Byron. London: Minerva Press, 1808 (2nd ed. 1812).
- Hours of Affluence, and Days of Indigence. A Novel. In four volumes. By Miss Byron, author of The English-Woman, &c. London: Minerva Press, 1809.
- The Alderman and The Peer; or, The Ancient Castle & Modern Villa. In Three Volumes. By Miss Byron, author of The Englishwoman, Hours of Affluence and Days of Indigence, &c. London: Minerva Press, 1810.
- The Englishman. A Novel. In Six Volumes. By Miss Byron, author of The Englishwoman; Hours of Affluence and Days of Indigence; Modern Villa and Ancient Castle, &c. &c. London: Minerva Press, 1812.
- The Bachelor's Journal. Inscribed (without permission) to the Girls of England. In two volumes. Edited by Miss Byron, Author of the Englishwoman, The Englishman, Hours of Affluence and Days of Indigence, Alderman and Peer, &c. &c. London: Minerva Press, 1815.

=== By "A Modern Antique" ===
- Celia in Search of a Husband. By a Modern Antique. In Two Volumes. London: Minerva Press, 1809 (2nd & 3rd eds. 1809).
- The English Exposé; or, Men and Women "Abroad" and "At Home." In Four Volumes. By a Modern Antique, author of Celia in Search of a Husband, &c. London: Minerva Press, 1814.
- The Spinster's Journal. In Three Volumes. By a Modern Antique, author of Celia in Search of a Husband, English Exposé, &c. London: Minerva Press, 1816.

== Etexts ==
- Celia in Search of a Husband (1809) (HathiTrust: Vol. 1 & 2. Also at Internet Archive.)
- The English-Woman (2nd ed., 1812) (Etext, HathiTrust. Also at Internet Archive.)
- The Englishman (1812) (Etext, HathiTrust. Also at Internet Archive and Google: Vols. I, II, III, IV, V, & VI.)

== See also ==
- List of Minerva Press authors
- Minerva Press

== Notes and references ==
=== References ===
- Brown, Susan, Patrica Clements, and Isobel Grundy, eds. "Medora Gordon Byron." Orlando: Women’s Writing in the British Isles from the Beginnings to the Present. Cambridge University Press Online, 2006. Accessed 2023-07-16.
- Franklin, Caroline. Introduction. Celia in Search of a Husband: By a Modern Antique. Edited by Caroline Franklin. London: Routledge, 2022, pp. x–xx. DOI: https://doi.org/10.4324/9781003164203. eBook ISBN 9781003164203
- Mandai, Anthony. "Mrs. Meeke and Minerva: the mystery of the marketplace." Eighteenth-Century Life. Volume 42, Number 2, April 2018.
- Summers, Montague. "Byron, Miss Medora Gordon." A Gothic bibliography London: The Fortune Press, 1941, p. 28. (Online, Internet Archive)
- Rose, Starlina. "Language, Gender, and Class in Miss Byron’s 1812 Novel The Englishwoman." The English Languages: History, Diaspora, Culture 6 (2020): 23.
- "Byron, Medora Gordon." The Women's Print History Project, 2019, Person ID 443. Accessed 2023-07-16.
