= Mary Charlton =

Mary Charlton may refer to:

- Mary Charlton (writer) (fl. 1794–1824), English Gothic novelist and translator
- Mary G. Charlton Edholm (1854–1935), née Charlton, American reformer and journalist

== See also ==
- Mary Carleton (1642–1673), English confidence artist
