= Mary Charlton (writer) =

British Gothic novelist

Mary Charlton (fl. 1794–1824), Gothic novelist and translator, was a "leading light" at the Minerva Press.

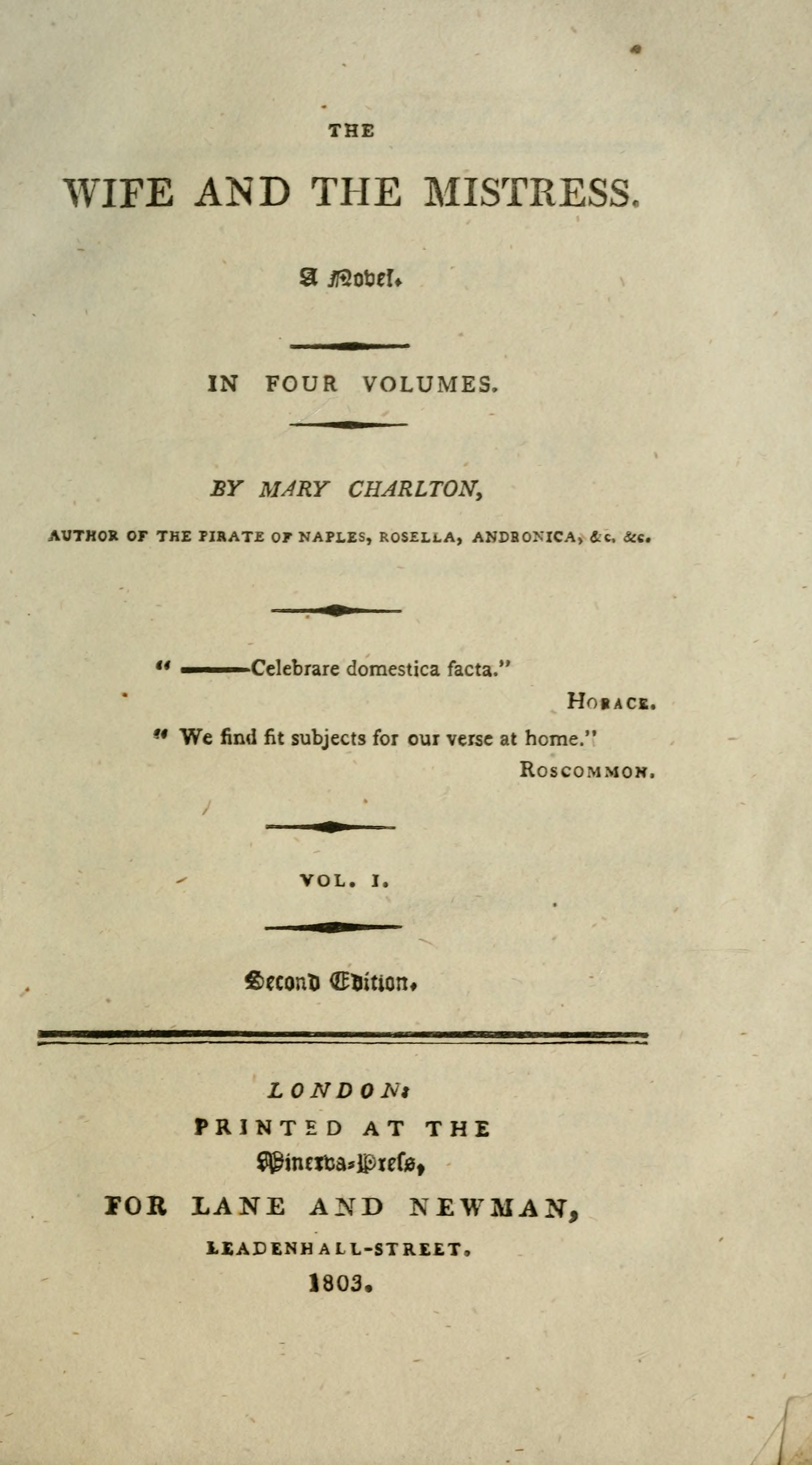
Title page of Mary Charlton's The Wife and the Mistress. A Novel. (Vol. 1; London: Minerva Press, 1802; 2nd ed: 1803) (HathiTrust)

== Work ==
Mary Charlton was a prolific novelist and translator for the popular Minerva Press, to the extent that publisher William Lane named her in sixth place on his list of "particular and favourite Authors" in his prospectus. Although the Press was frequently seen as low-brow and even disreputable, Charlton herself seems to have often received solid reviews: the Critical Review described Andronica as "interesting and amusing" and the Anti-Jacobin refers to the "elegant satire and delicate irony" of Rosella. Rosella is "a satire on novel-reading" and her other novels contain "socially critical" elements alongside the Gothic. At least two of her novels, Rosella and The Pirate of Naples, were translated into French and published in Paris, and several of her works went into second editions.

== Life ==
Despite her professional success, next to nothing is known of her life. She is one of the "lost" women writers listed in Dale Spender's Mothers of the Novel: 100 Good Women Writers Before Jane Austen (1986).

== Bibliography ==
=== Novels ===
- The parisian; or, genuine anecdotes of distinguished and Noble Characters. In two volumes. (London: Minerva Press, 1794)
- Andronica, or the fugitive bride, a novel, in two volumes. By Mary Charlton. (London: Minerva Press, 1797)
- Ammorvin and Zallida. A novel. In two volumes. (London: Minerva Press, 1798)
- Phedora; or, the forest of Minski. In four volumes. By Mary Charlton. (London: Minerva Press, 1798)
- Rosella, or modern occurrences. A novel. In four volumes. By Mary Charlton, author of Phedora, &c. (London: Minerva; Paris; Dublin: P. Wogan, W. Porter, and T. Burnside, 1799)
- The Pirate of Naples. A Novel. In three volumes. By Mary Charlton, Author of Rosella, Andronica, Phedora, &c. (London: Minerva; Paris: Le Normant, 1801)
- The Wife and the Mistress. A Novel. In four volumes. By Mary Charlton, author of The Pirate of Naples, Rosella, Andronica, &c. &c. 4 volumes. (London: Minerva Press, 1802; 2nd ed: 1803)
- The Philosophic Kidnapper. A Novel. In Three Volumes. Altered from the French by the Author of The Wife and The Mistress. (London: Minerva Press, 1803)
- The Homicide. A Novel. Taken from The Comedie di Goldoni, by Mary Charlton, author of "The Wife and Mistress" &c. In Two Volumes. (London: Minerva Press, 1805; 2nd ed: Rosaura di Viralva; or, The Homicide in 1813)
- Grandeur and Meanness; or, Domestic Persecution. A Novel. In Three Volumes. By Mary Charlton, author of The Wife and Mistress, Rosella, &c. &c. (London: A.K. Newman, 1824)
- Past Events. An Historical Novel, of the Eighteenth Century, by the author of "The Wife and the Mistress," "The Pirate of Naples," "Rosella," "Andronica," &c. &c. In three volumes. (London: R.P. Moore, 1824; 2nd ed: Past Events; or the Treacherous Guide, a Romance, 1830)

=== Translations ===
- Lafontaine, August Heinrich Julius. The Reprobate. A Novel. In Two Volumes. Translated by the Author of The Wife and the Mistress, &c. The Original by Augustus La Fontaine. (London: Minerva Press, 1802)
- Lafontaine, August Heinrich Julius. The Rake and the Misanthrope. A Novel. In Two Volumes. From the German of Augustus La Fontaine.(London: Minerva Press, 1804)

=== Children's literature ===
- Mrs. Charlton's pathetic poetry for youth: calculated to awaken the sympathetic affections. (London: Knevett, Arliss, and Baker, 1811; 2nd ed.: Whittingham and Arliss, 1815)

== Resources ==
- "Charlton, Mary." The Women's Print History Project, 2019, Person ID 629. Accessed 2022-07-20. (WPHP)
- Corvey Women Writers on the Web Author's Page
- Grenby, M. O. "Charlton, Mary (fl. 1794–1824), writer and translator." Oxford Dictionary of National Biography. 03. Oxford University Press. Accessed 2022-07-20.
- "Mary Charlton." Orlando: Women’s Writing in the British Isles from the Beginnings to the Present. Accessed 2022-07-20. (Orlando)

== See also ==
- List of Minerva Press authors
- Minerva Press
