= Anne Rice Hughes =

British poet, novelist, dramatist

Anne Hughes
- Occupation: writer
- Writing career
- Years active: 1784-1795
- Period: Romantic

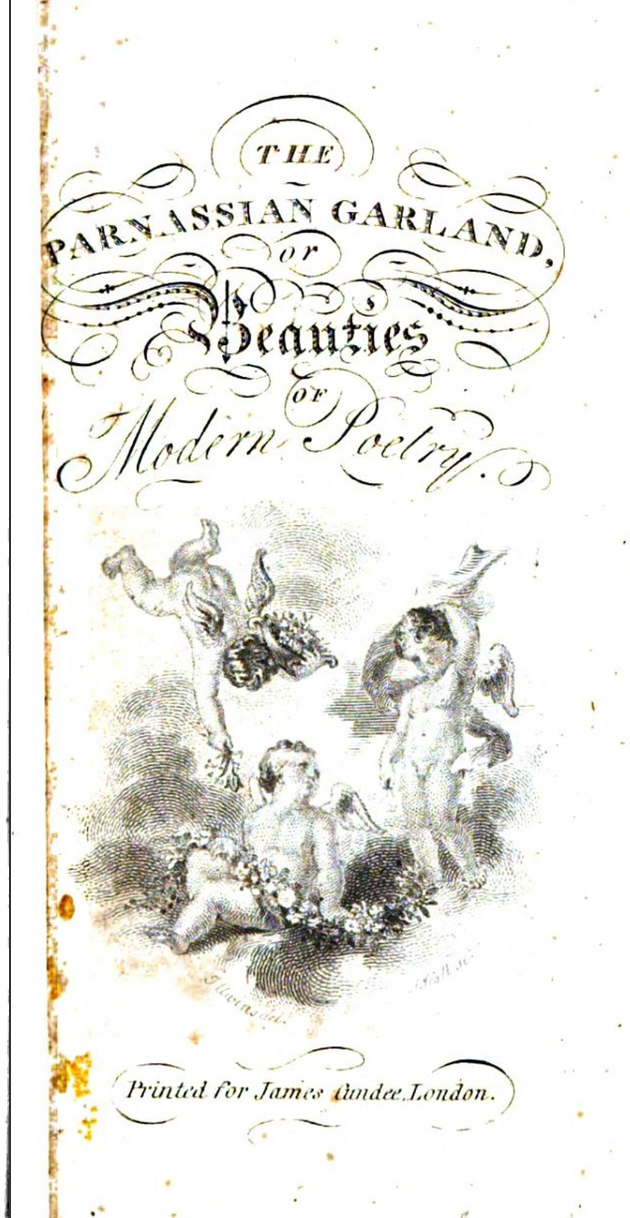
Frontispiece of John Evans's The Parnassian Garland, 1807

Anne Rice Hughes (fl. 1784-1795) was a British poet, novelist, and dramatist. She is one of the many women writers of the eighteenth century, long out of print, who were recuperated in the late twentieth century by literary scholars, including Dale Spender and Janet Todd.

According to at least one twentieth-century commentator, Hughes' work was "typically high-principled" and "unremarkable." While she may not appeal to most contemporary readers, however, she would seem to have had a steady career during her lifetime. Her books must have sold tolerably well for her to have maintained a working relationship with the publisher William Lane at the highly commercial Minerva Press. Caroline seems to have been particularly successful: second and third editions came out within a year of the initial publication. Her novels were simultaneously published in London and Ireland, and at least two of her works, Zoraida and Henry and Isabella, were translated into French. Her poem "The Wish of Zara, The Sultaness" was anthologized in 1807 and the Jackson Bibliography of Romantic Poetry notes that "the Critical Review treated her poetical works with respect."

Her novels were either published anonymously or "by the author of," although she published both her Poems and her Moral Dramas under her own name.

Next to nothing is known of Hughes' life, and some credible commentators have questioned her authorship of all the titles usually attributed to her. Most, however, would seem to have achieved a consensus about her oeuvre:

== Works ==
- Poems. London: J. Dodsley, 1784.
- "The Wish of Zara, The Sultaness." The Parnassian Garland; or, beauties of modern poetry: consisting of upwards of two hundred pieces, selected from the works of the most distinguished poets of the present age. John Evans, Editor. London: Albion Press, 1907, 88-89.

=== Novels ===
- Caroline; or, the Diversities of Fortune, 3 vols. London: William Lane, 1787.
- Henry and Isabella; or, a traite through life. London: William Lane, 1788.
- Jemima, 2 vols. London: William Lane, 1795.
- Zoraida; or, Village annals. A Novel, 3 vols. London: Thomas Axtell, 1786.

=== Drama ===
- Moral Dramas. Intended for Private Representation. London: William Lane, 1790. (Consists of three plays: Cordelia, Constantia, and Aspacia.)
