= Maria Elizabeth Budden =

English novelist and children's writer (c. 1780 – 1832)

Maria Elizabeth Budden, (née Halsey, c. 1780 – 26 April 1832) was a novelist, translator and writer of didactic children's books, who frequently signed her work "M. E. B." or "A Mother". Her True Stories... series of history books for young people remained popular for many years. Little has come to light about Budden's life.

== Publications ==
Budden's most popular work throughout the first half of the 19th century was her anonymously published Always Happy!!: Or, Anecdotes of Felix and his Sister Serena. A Tale (1814). Also perennially popular were her True Stories... series of history books for young people (1819 onwards), and her novel Claudine: or Humility the Basis of All of the Virtues. A Swiss Tale (1822). Her novel Right and Wrong Exhibited in the History of Rosa and Agnes (1818) takes the story of twins who grow up to be very different as a way of inculcating "life lessons for the young".

These and other works of hers are available in print on demand editions, for the benefit of scholars seeking source material on the history of education and upbringing. According to a modern account, Budden at her peak was writing more than one book a year for her publisher, John Harris.

Both Budden and the poet and novelist Elizabeth Thomas have been associated tentatively with the pseudonymous "Mrs. Bridget Bluemantle", the author of nine novels published by the London Minerva Press between 1806 and 1818. However, Budden's Claudine... and "Mrs Bluemantle's" Claudine... are different novels.

== External sources ==
- A study of the Budden novel Right And Wrong, Exhibited in the History of Rosa And Agnes (1818)
- A facsimile of Nina: An Icelandic Tale (1827)
- Links to online editions of eleven other books
