= Catherine Cuthbertson =

English novelist (1775–1842)

- Born: c. 1775
- Died: June 1842
- Occupation: Novelist
- Writing career
- Genre: Gothic fiction

Catherine Cuthbertson (c. 1775 – June 1842) was an English novelist who was best known for her novel The Romance of the Pyrenees (1803), which was widely popular throughout England. Her novel, which was influenced by Ann Radcliffe was translated into French and German, and it went into many editions. Her novels closely mirrored the style of Ann Radcliffe, and she was one of the best Radcliffe imitators.

== Life ==
Cuthbertson's origins are not known, although it appears that she was born before 1780, was the daughter of an army officer, and had at least four siblings. She is thought to have died some time after her final known book appeared in 1830. Suppositions that she was a sister of Helen Craik have not been substantiated. Research in 2016 at the University of Kent revealed that "Kitty" Cuthbertson was well known in her time. A burial record discovered indicates that she died in Ealing in June 1842, possibly aged 67. This would make her date of birth about 1775.

== Works ==
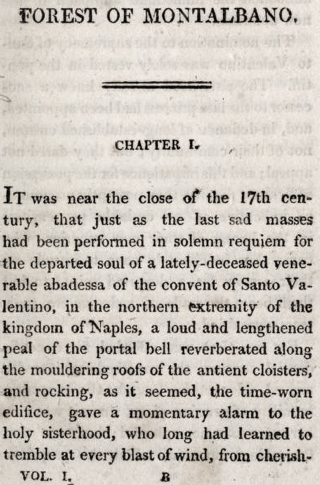
A portion of the first sentence of The Forest of Montalbano (London: George Robinson, 1810)

Among her works were The Romance of the Pyrenees (1803), The Forest of Montalbano (1810), Adelaide; or, The Countercharm (1813), Rosabella, or A Mother's Marriage (1817), The Hut and the Castle: a Romance (1823), and Sir Ethelbert; or, the Dissolution of Monasteries (1830). At least one, Santo Sebastiano (1806), was published twice in penny instalments, as The Heiress of Montalvan, or First and Second Love (1845–46) and as Santo Sebastiano, or The Heiress of Montalvan (1847–48).

Cuthbertson has been described by present-day scholars as a "fairly conventional novelist" using "historically realised settings (often in continental Europe)" with "happy endings". Her upper-class characters appear virtuous, her lower-class ones comic or occasionally horrific. There are many incidents of fainting.

A recent anthologist puts her among "the best of the Radcliffe imitators." Romance of the Pyrenees was serialized in the Lady's Magazine, starting in February 1804, but not in book form, "probably because the expected second sale did not warrant the cost." It took three years and "is the longest novel ever published in an eighteenth-century miscellany, with the single exception of Pamela." The work was also translated into French, but attributed there to Radcliffe, and German. Sir Ethelbert has been noted as having footnotes which reflect wide historical reading.

== Bibliography ==
- The Romance of the Pyrenees (1803)
- The Forest of Montalbano (1810)
- Adelaide; or, The Countercharm (1813)
- Santo Sebastiano; or, The Young Protector (1814)
- Rosabella, or A Mother's Marriage (1817)
- The Hut and the Castle: a Romance (1823)
- Sir Ethelbert; or, the Dissolution of Monasteries (1830)

== See also ==
- List of Minerva Press authors
- Minerva Press

== External source ==
- Online editions of her novels: the Online Books Page Retrieved 28 November 2015. (However, those listed include Phœbe; or, The Miller's Maid, which is more usually attributed to James Malcolm Rymer.)
