= Amelia Beauclerc =

British Gothic novelist

- Born: 1 January 1790
- Died: 1 March 1820 (aged 30)
- Occupation: Novelist
- Writing career
- Pen name: Emma de Lisle (misascribed)
- Language: English
- Genres: Gothic; sentimental

Amelia Beauclerc (1 January 1790 – 1 March 1820) was a British Gothic novelist.

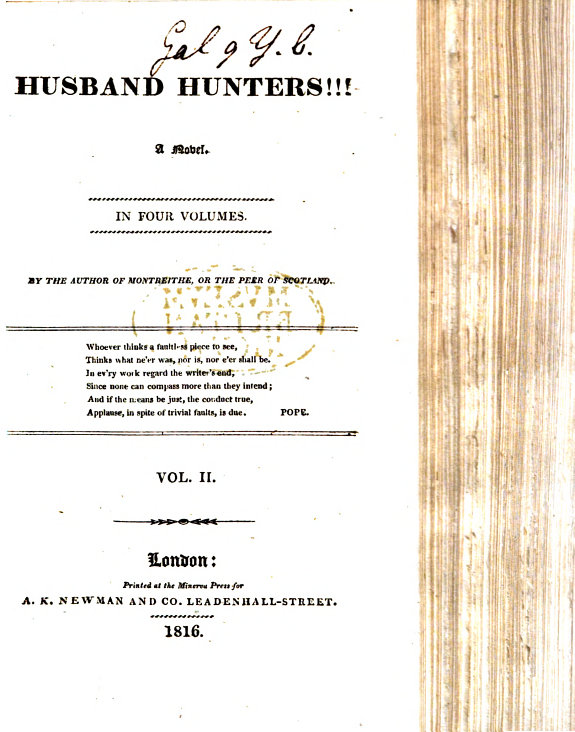
Title page of Amelia Beauclerc's Husband Hunters!!! A Novel. Vol II. London: Minerva Press, A. K. Newman and Co., 1816 (Google Books)

== Life ==
Beauclerc's life has been described as "invisible."

== Writing ==
It has taken time to establish a complete bibliography for Beauclerc. Her first two novels, Eva of Cambria, or, The Fugitive Daughter (1810) and Ora and Juliet, or, Influence of First Principles (1811), were published by mistake under the name "Emma de Lisle," the nom de plume of another novelist, Emma Parker. Beauclerc's next four novels were published "by the author of," but her final two novels were clearly published under her own name.

Six of Beauclerc's eight novels were published by the Minerva Press, famous for their sentimental and Gothic titles. Her interest was more in the former; one commentator called her novels "sham Gothic" because they focused more on sentiment than on more thrilling genre elements. In this regard, Beauclerc followed the example of Ann Radcliffe and the tradition of the "female Gothic."

During her lifetime, Beauclearc received mixed reviews, from the utterly damning to the moderately approving. In the twentieth century, while some of her work has been called "predictably gothic, heavy-handed, or punitively moral" her "best work" has been judged "impressive, focusing on relations between the sexes."

== Works ==
- Eva of Cambria; or, The Fugitive Daughter. A Novel. In Three Volumes. By Emma de Lisle, author of the Soldier's Offspring, &c. &c. London: Minerva Press, A. K. Newman and Co., 1811.
- Ora and Juliet; or, Influence of First Principles. A Novel. In Four Volumes. By the author of Eva of Cambria, &c. London: Minerva Press, A. K. Newman and Co., 1811.
- Alinda; or, The Child of Mystery. A Novel. In Four Volumes. By the author of "Ora and Juliet, Castle of Tariffa, &c." London: Benjamin and Richard Crosby and Co., 1812.
- The Castle of Tariffa; or, The Self-Banished Man. A Novel. In Four Volumes. By the Author of The Fugitive Daughter, or Eva of Cambria; Ora and Juliet, or Influence of First Principles. London: Benjamin and Richard Crosby and Co., 1812.
- Montreithe; or, The Peer of Scotland. A Novel. In Four Volumes. London: Minerva Press, A. K. Newman and Co., 1814.
- Husband Hunters!!! A Novel. In four volumes. By the author of Montreithe, or The Peer of Scotland. London: Minerva Press, A. K. Newman and Co., 1816.
- The Deserter. A Novel. In Four Volumes. By Amelia Beauclerc, author of Montreithe, or The Peer of Scotland; Husband Hunters, &c. &c. London: Minerva Press, A. K. Newman and Co., 1817.
- Disorder and Order. A Novel. In Three Volumes. By Amelia Beauclerc, Author of Montreithe, or the Peer of Scotland; Alinda, or Child of Mystery; the Deserter; Husband Hunters, &c. London: Minerva Press, A. K. Newman and Co., 1820.

== Etexts ==
- The Deserter. A Novel. In Four Volumes. By Amelia Beauclerc, author of Montreithe, or The Peer of Scotland; Husband Hunters, &c. &c. London: Minerva Press, A. K. Newman and Co., 1817. (Google Books, Vols. 1&2, 3&4)
- Disorder and Order. A Novel. In Three Volumes. By Amelia Beauclerc, Author of Montreithe, or the Peer of Scotland; Alinda, or Child of Mystery; the Deserter; Husband Hunters, &c. London: Minerva Press, A. K. Newman and Co., 1820. (Google Books, Vol. I, II, III)
- Husband Hunters!!! A Novel. In four volumes. By the author of Montreithe, or The Peer of Scotland. London: Minerva Press, A. K. Newman and Co., 1816. (Google Books, Vol. I, II, III, IV)

== Resources ==
- "Amelia Beauclerc 1811 - 1820." Accessed 2022-07-15. (Covey)
- "Amelia Beauclerc." Orlando: Women’s Writing in the British Isles from the Beginnings to the Present. Accessed 2022-07-14. (Orlando)
- "Beauclerc, Amelia." The Women's Print History Project, 2019, Person ID 642. Accessed 2022-07-14. (WPHP)

== See also ==
- List of Minerva Press authors
- Minerva Press
