= Elizabeth Thomas (poet/novelist) =

English novelist and poet (1771–1855)

- Born: Elizabeth Wolferstan; 1771; Hartland, Devon
- Died: 1855 (84 years); Parkham, Devon
- Occupation: writer
- Spouse: Thomas Thomas
- Relatives: Mary Wolferstan (mother); Edward Wolferstan (father)
- Writing career
- Pen name: Mrs Bridget Bluemantle; Mrs Martha Homely
- Language: English
- Period: Romantic era

Elizabeth Thomas [née Wolferstan] (1771–1855), novelist and poet, is an ambiguous figure. Details of her early life are missing, and her authorship of some of the works attributed to her has been contested due to the use of pseudonyms.

== Biography ==
She was born in Hartland, Devon to Mary (d. 1818) and Edward Wolferstan (d. 1788). In or around 1795 she married the Reverend Thomas Thomas (d. 16 December 1838), vicar of Tidenham, Gloucestershire since 1801. She was widowed before 1847 and died of bronchitis at the age of 84 in Devon.

== Writing ==
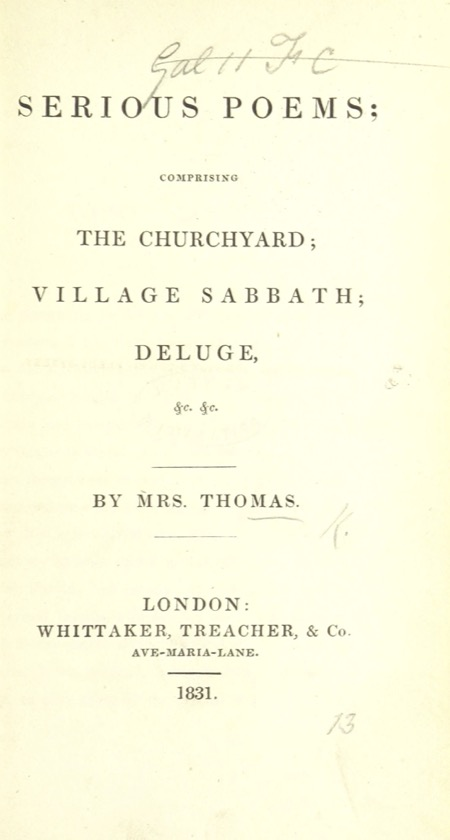
Title page of Elizabeth Thomas's Serious Poems (London, 1831).

Thomas began her career writing novels, but shifted to publishing poetry when she gained enough nerve despite the "great and mighty" Romantic poets, as she put it.

Her religious verse received mixed reviews, as did her novel, Purity of Heart, "a virulent, polemical novel addressed to the anonymous author of Glenarvon, the 1816 succès de scandale," presumed to have been authored by Lady Caroline Lamb. She has been identified as "Mrs Bridget Bluemantle", author of nine Minerva Press novels from 1806 to 1818, though this identification remains problematic. She also used the pseudonym "Mrs Martha Homely." She dedicated The Confessions (1818), a collection of poetry, to her children.

== Works ==
=== Novels ===
- Maids As They Are Not, and Wives As They Are. A Novel. In Four Volumes. By Mrs. Martha Homely. London: Printed by J. D. Dewick, Aldersgate-Street, for W. Earle, jun. 43, Wigmore-Street, 1803.
- The Three Old Maids of the House of Penruddock. A Novel. In Three Volumes. By Mrs. Bridget Bluemantle. London: Printed at the Minerva Press, for Lane, Newman, and Co. Leadenhall-Street, 1806. (NB. The introduction (vol. 1, pp. 1–2) is signed "Martha Homely".)
- The Husband and Wife; or, The Matrimonial Martyr. A Novel. In Three Volumes. By Mrs. Bridget Bluemantle, author of The Three Old Maids, &c. London: Printed at the Minerva Press, for Lane, Newman, and Co. Leadenhall-Street, 1808.
- Monte Video; or, The Officer's Wife and Her Sister. A Novel. In four volumes. By Mrs. Bridget Bluemantle, author of The Husband and Wife, Three Old Maids, &c. &c. London: Printed at the Minerva Press, for A. K. Newman, and Co. (successors to Lane, Newman, & Co.) Leadenhall-Street, 1809 (1st American edition, 1816)
- Mortimer Hall; or, The Labourer's Hire. A Novel. IN Four Volumes. By Mrs. Bridget Bluemantle, author of Husband and Wife, Three Old Maids of the House of Penruddock, Monte Video, &c. &c. London: Printed at the Minerva Press, for A. K. Newman and Co. (Successors to Lane, Newman, & Co.) Leadenhall-Street, 1811.
- The Vindictive Spirit. A Novel. In Four Volumes. By Mrs. Bridget Bluemantle, author of Husband and Wife; Monte Video; Mortimer Hall; Three old maids, &c. &c. London: Printed at the Minerva Press, for A. K. Newman and Co. Leadenhall-Street, 1812.
- The Prison-House; or, The World We Live In. A Novel. In Four Volumes. By Mrs. Bridget Bluemantle, Author of the Vindictive Spirit, Husband and Wife, Monte Video, &c. &c. London: Printed at the Minerva Press, for A. K. Newman and Co. Leadenhall-Street, 1814.
- The Baron of Falconberg; or, Childe Harolde in Prose. In three volumes. By Mrs. Bridget Bluemantle, author of The Prison House, Vindictive Spirit, Mortimer Hall, Monte Video, Husband and Wife, &c. &c. London: Printed at the Minerva Press, for A. K. Newman and Co. Leadenhall-Street, 1815.
- Purity of Heart; or, The Ancient Costume. A Tale, in one volume, addressed to the author of Glenarvon. By an old wife of twenty years. London: Printed for W. Simpkin and R. Marshall, Stationers'-Court, Ludgate-Street, 1816. (2nd edition, 1816; 1st American edition, 1816)
- Claudine; or, Pertinacity. a Novel. In Three Volumes. By Mrs. Bridget Bluemantle, author of Mortimer Hall, The Vindictive Spirit, Prison House, Baron of Falconberg, &c. &c. London: Printed at the Minerva Press for A. K. Newman and Co. Leadenhall-Street, 1817.
- Woman; Or, Minor Maxims: A Sketch. In Two Volumes. Printed at the Minerva Press, for A.K. Newman and Company Leadenhall-street, 1818.

=== Poetry ===
- The Confession; or, The Novice of St. Clare, and Other Poems. London: Simpkin and Marshall, 1818. (by "the author of Purity of Heart")
- Serious Poems; Comprising the Churchyard; Village Sabbath; Deluge, &c. &c. By Mrs. Thomas. London: Whittaker, Treacher, and Co., Ave-Maria-Lane, 1831.
- The Convert. A tale of real life. [In verse.] [London], [1840].
- The Georgian; Or, the Moor of Tripoli, and Other Poems. C.A. Bartlett, 1847.

== See also ==
- List of Minerva Press authors
- Minerva Press

== Etexts ==
- The Baron of Falconberg, 1815 (Google Books Vol. I, II, III)
- Purity of Heart, 1816 (Etext, Google Books)
- Claudine, 1817 (Google Books Vol. I, II, III)
- Woman; Or, Minor Maxims, 1818 (Etext, HathiTrust)
- Serious Poems, 1831 (Etext, British Library)
- The Georgian, 1847 (Etext, Google Books)

== Sources ==
- Blain, Virginia, et al., eds. "Elizabeth Thomas." The Feminist Companion to Literature in English. New Haven and London: Yale UP, 1990. 1076.
- Elizabeth Thomas, British Fiction, 1800-1829: a database of production, circulation, & reception
- Coleman, Deirdre. "Thomas, Elizabeth (1770/71–1855)." Oxford Dictionary of National Biography. Ed. H. C. G. Matthew and Brian Harrison. Oxford: OUP, 2004. 13 May 2007.
- "Thomas, Elizabeth." Jackson Bibliography of Romantic Poetry, University of Toronto Libraries. Accessed 2022-09-12.
- "Thomas, Elizabeth." The Women's Print History Project, 2019, Person ID 476. Accessed 2022-09-12.
