= Elizabeth Meeke =

English novelist and children's writer (1761–1826)

Elizabeth Meeke (née Allen; 13 November 1761 – c. October 1826) was a prolific English author, translator and children's writer, and the stepsister of Frances Burney. She wrote about 30 novels, published by the Minerva Press in the late 18th and early 19th centuries.

== Biography ==
Elizabeth Allen was baptised at St Margaret's Church, King's Lynn. She was the youngest daughter of Stephen and Elizabeth "Eliza". After her father's death, her mother remarried Charles Burney in 1767.

In 1775, Elizabeth was sent to Paris for her education. In 1777, she absconded to Ypres to marry an older man Samuel Meeke. The couple subsequently moved to Geneva and then back to Paris. Her half-siblings Richard and Sarah Burney were sent the Meekes for education. In 1787, the Meekes separated. Elizabeth returned to England in 1793.

== Identity ==
The novels appeared mainly under the name Mrs. Meeke, sometimes under the pseudonym Gabrielli, and a few anonymously. Their author was once assumed to be Mary Meeke, the wife of a Staffordshire vicar, but "Mrs. Meeke" was conclusively identified as Elizabeth Meeke in an article by Simon Macdonald in 2013. She is thought to have died in about October 1826.

== Fiction ==
Meeke's debut novel was Count St Blanchard in 1795. Others include The Abbey of Clugny, The Mysterious Wife, Anecdotes of the Altamont Family and Which is the Man? Her works include several translations from French, such as Elizabeth, or the Exiles of Siberia.

The third edition of Chamber's Cyclopaedia of English Literature in 1903 disparaged her work:

The novels are worthless and would be quite forgotten but for the mention of them in the Life of Macaulay, who in his younger days at least "all but knew them by heart". According to Macaulay's sister the most of them turn on the fortunes of some young man in a very low rank of life who ultimately proves to be the son of a duke.

Current evaluations are not so dismissive. Anthony Mandai describes Meeke as "the most prolific novelist of the age," and argues for her complicated, yet central, role as a professional author through the watershed decades during which she wrote.

== Bibliography ==
=== Novels ===
- Count St. Blancard, or the Prejudiced Judge (1795)
- The Abbey of Clugny (1795)
- Palmira and Ermance (1797)
- The Mysterious Wife (as by Gabrielli) (1797)
- The Sicilian (anonymous) (1798)
- Harcourt (anonymous) (1799)
- Ellesmere (1799)
- Anecdotes of the Altamont Family (anonymous) (1800)
- Which is the Man? (1801)
- The Mysterious Husband (as by Gabrielli) (1801)
- Midnight Weddings (1802)
- Independence (as by Gabrielli) (1802)
- Amazement! (1804)
- The Old Wife and the Young Husband (1804)
- The Nine Days' Wonder (1804)
- Something Odd! (anonymous) (1804)
- The Wonder of the Village (anonymous) (1805)
- Something Strange (as by Gabrielli) (1806)
- "There Is a Secret, Find It Out!" (1808)
- Langhton Priory (as by Gabrielli) (1809)
- Stratagems Defeated (as by Gabrielli) (1811)
- Matrimony, the Height of Bliss or Extreme of Misery (1811)
- Conscience (1814)
- Spanish Campaigns, or The Jew (1815)
- The Veiled Protectress, or the Mysterious Mother (1818)
- What Shall Be, Shall Be (1823)

=== Translations ===
- A Tale of Mystery, or Celina, by François Guillaume Ducray-Duminil (1803)
- Lobenstein Village, by August Lafontaine (1804)
- Julian, or, My Father's House, by François Guillaume Ducray-Duminil (1807)
- The Unpublished Correspondence of Madame du Deffand (1810)
- Messiah, by Friedrich Gottlieb Klopstock (with Mary Collyer) (1811)
- Elizabeth, or, the Exiles of Siberia, by Sophie Ristaud Cottin (1817)

=== Children's books ===
- The Birth-Day Present
- Mamma's Gift
- The Parent's Offering to a Good Child

== Sources ==
- Lee, Sidney, ed. (1894). "Meeke, Mary" . Dictionary of National Biography. Vol. 37. London: Smith, Elder & Co.
