= The Horrors of Oakendale Abbey =

1797 anonymous novel

- Language: English
- Publisher: Minerva Press
- Publication date: 1797

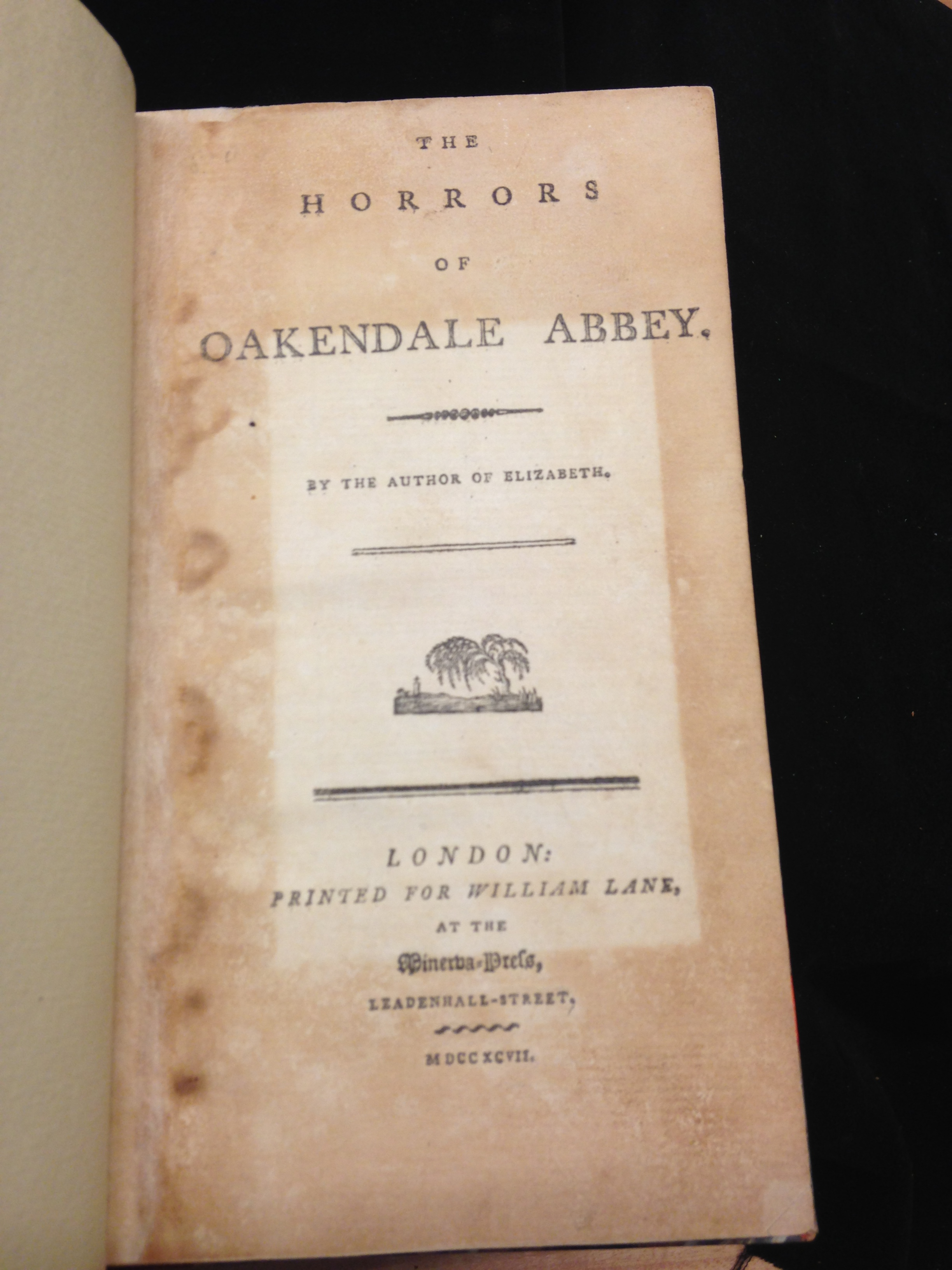

The Horrors of Oakendale Abbey is a gothic novel first published in 1797 in one octavo volume by the sensationalist Minerva Press of London. It proved particularly popular with the new circulating libraries of the day. A gothic tale of horror, rather than suspense, it centres on the physical and grotesque, rather than on metaphysical terror.

== Synopsis ==
The novel tells the story of Laura, a foundling refugee from revolutionary France, her attempted seduction at the hands of Lord Oakendale and her explorations of the haunted Cumberland abbey of the title which lead her to stumble upon a den of resurrection men and body snatchers. It is unusually graphic in its depiction of death and decay, even by the standards of the day, in terms of its descriptions of the gruesome. The book is similar in some respects to Eliza Parsons' The Castle of Wolfenbach although it does not have the same emotional subtlety of that work.

== Authorship ==
The title page of the novel simply says it is "by the author of Elizabeth," referring to another novel published by the Minerva Press in 1797. Both Elizabeth and The Horrors of Oakendale Abbey are attributed to a "Mrs. Carver" in the Minerva Library's 1814 catalogue. "Mrs. Carver" is possibly a pseudonym for Anthony Carlisle, a well known surgeon, later knighted. The name of Carver would thus be a play on the name of his occupation. In fact, the name Carlisle is mentioned in the book itself, by a guard who tells the main characters "that they frequently procured bodies after word interned at or near Carlisle."

== Publication ==
After first being published in London in 1797, it was reprinted in the United States in 1799 (in New York) and again in 1812 (in Frankford, Pennsylvania). A modern edition was published in 2006 by Zittaw Press in the United States.
