= Anthony Carlisle =

Sir Anthony Carlisle FRCS, FRS
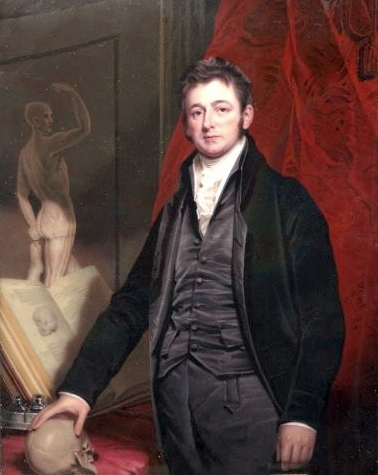
- Anthony Carlisle by Henry Bone (1827)
- Born: February 15, 1768; Stillington, County Durham
- Died: 2 November 1840 (aged 72)
- Occupation: Surgeon

Sir Anthony Carlisle FRCS, FRS (15 February 1768 in Stillington, County Durham, England – 2 November 1840 in London) was an English surgeon.

== Life ==
He was born in Stillington, County Durham, the third son of Thomas Carlisle and his first wife, and the half-brother of Nicholas Carlisle. He was apprenticed to medical practitioners in York and Durham, including his uncle Anthony Hubback and William Green. He later studied in London under John Hunter. In 1793 he was appointed Surgeon at Westminster Hospital in 1793, remaining there for 47 years. He also studied art at the Royal Academy.

In 1800, he and William Nicholson discovered electrolysis by passing a voltaic current through water, decomposing it into its constituent elements of hydrogen and oxygen.

He was elected a Fellow of the Royal Society in 1804. He was Professor of Anatomy of the Society from 1808 to 1824.

In 1815 he became a member of the council of the Royal College of Surgeons, and served as president of the College in 1828 and 1837. He twice delivered their Hunterian oration, causing consternation at his second oration in 1826 by using the occasion to talk about oysters, earning the epithet of Sir Anthony Oyster. He also delivered their Croonian Lecture in 1804, 1805 and 1807.

He was Surgeon Extraordinary (1820–1830) to King George IV, by whom he was knighted on 24 July 1821.

It is possible that he may have been the author of The Horrors of Oakendale Abbey, a gothic novel published anonymously in 1797 and attributed to a "Mrs Carver". The name "Carver" may be a reference to Carlisle's profession. The name Carlisle is even mentioned in the book itself.

== Family ==
He had married Martha Symmons, daughter of John Symmons, in Alcester, Warwickshire on 23 August 1800. On his death in 1840 he was buried in Kensal Green Cemetery.

== See also ==
- Voltaic pile
- Timeline of hydrogen technologies
