= Emma Parker =

Welsh novelist

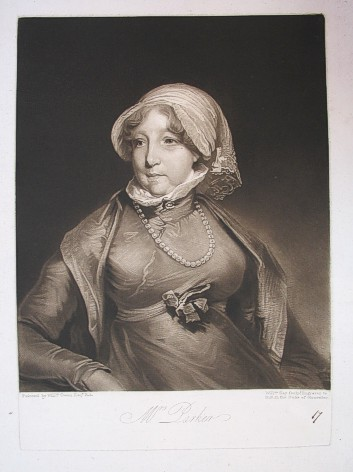
- Portrait of Parker by William Say (c. 1812)
- Occupation: Novelist
- Writing career
- Pen name: Emma de Lisle
- Language: English
- Years active: 1809–1817
- Period: Romantic age

Emma Parker (pseud. "Emma De Lisle"; fl. 1809–1817) was an Anglo-Welsh novelist of whom very little is known, although her work was generally well-reviewed during her lifetime. Her epistolary novel Self-Deception explores the cultural and religious differences between the English and the French.

== Writing ==
Emma Parker seems to have been an Anglican, and an impoverished member of the gentry class who lived alone in Denbighshire, at Fairfield House. Her home was named after a family in her first novel, A Soldier's Offspring, or, The Sisters (1809), which she submitted to Minerva Press, specialists in sentimental and Gothic fiction, in the hope of earning some money. The novel was dedicated to her mother, not mentioned by name, and features a pair of sisters, one sensible and one flighty.

Parker went on to write six more novels, all well received by reviewers: Elfrida; or, the Heiress of Belgrove (1810); Fitz-Edward, or, The Cambrians (1811); Virginia; or the Peace of Amiens (1811); Aretas (1813); The Guerrilla Chief (1815); and the epistolary Self-Deception (1816). She also published a "well-informed" volume of essays: Important Trifles: Chiefly Appropriate to Females on their Entrance into Society (1817). The date of her death is not known.

According to the Canadian scholar Isobel Grundy, "Parker's work, always intelligent, became more interesting as her career progressed. Her conduct book demonstrates learning and advocates religious belief and strong-mindedness. Her novels often touch on political and military matters, on the hardships of soldiers and the difficulties of readjusting to civilian life. Self-Deception (a novel set after the marriage of the hero and heroine) explores the cultural and religious differences between English and French life."

=== Misascription ===
Confusion over the authorship of two novels, Eva of Cambria, or, The Fugitive Daughter (1810) and Ora and Juliet, or, Influence of First Principles (1811), can be traced back to the Minerva Press. At the time of printing they were misascribed to "Emma de Lisle", which was Emma Parker's pseudonym, but they were in fact not by her. The actual author is now believed to have been Amelia Beauclerc. The mishap was explained by Parker in the preface to Fitz-Edward; or, the Cambrians:

"It is necessary here to observe, that this Work would have appeared many months since; but, owing to a mistake, another manuscript, the production of another author, was sent to the press instead of mine, and, through inadvertency, printed under a similar supposition. This has already been explained as far as it was possible; and I have only here to add, that the following Work is that which was announced some months ago, as being about to be published under the title of Eva of Cambria but as another person’s Novel has, through an error, been published under that name, it was necessary to give a new title to the present Work."

== Works ==
=== Novels ===
- A Soldier's Offspring; or, The Sisters. A Tale. In Two Volumes. By Emma de Lisle. London: Minerva Press, A. K. Newman and Co., 1810.
- Elfrida, Heiress of Belgrove. A Novel, in Four Volumes. By Emma Parker. London: Printed for B. Crosby and Co.; J. Painter; and Wright and Cruikshanks, 1811.
- Fitz-Edward; or, The Cambrians. A Novel. Interspersed with Pieces of Poetry. In Three Volumes. By Emma de Lisle, author of A Soldier's Offspring, Elfrida, or the Heiress of Bellegrove, &c. &c. London: Minerva Press, A. K. Newman and Co., 1811.
- Virginia; or, The Peace of Amiens. A Novel. In Four Volumes. By Miss Emma Parker, author of Elfrida, Heiress of Belgrove. London: Benjamin Crosby and Co., 1811.
- Aretas. A Novel. In Four Volumes. By Emma Parker, Author of "Elfrida, Heiress of Belgrove," and "Virginia, or the Peace of Amiens." London: Benjamin and Richard Crosby and Co., 1813.
- The Guerrilla Chief: A Novel. In three volumes. By Emma Parker, author of "Elfrida, Heiress of Belgrove;"—"Virginia, or the Peace of Amiens;"—and "Arestas." London: William Lindsell, 1815; 2nd ed. 1817.
- Self-Deception. In a Series of Letters. By Emma Parker, author of "The Gurrilla Chief," "Aretas," &c. &c. London: Thomas Egerton, 1816.

=== Conduct literature ===
- Important Trifles. Chiefly Appropriate to Females on their Entrance into Society. London: Thomas Egerton, 1817.

== Etexts ==
- Elfrida, Heiress of Belgrove, 1811. (HathiTrust, Vol. I, II, III, IV)(Google Books, Vol. I, II, III, IV)
- Virginia, 1811. (HathiTrust, Vol. I, II, III, IV)
- The Guerrilla Chief, 1817. (HathiTrust, Vol. I, II, III)(Google Books, Vol. I, II, III)(Etexts, Internet Archive)
- Important Trifles, 1817. (Etext, British Library)(Etext, Google Books)
