= Agnes C. Hall =

Scottish writer (c.1775 – c.1776–1846)

Agnes C. Hall (née Scott; c. 1775 – c. 1776 – 24 November 1846), known by the pseudonym Rosalia St. Clair, was a Scottish writer and translator.

== Biography ==
Hall was born Agnes Crosbie Scott in Roxburghshire, Scotland sometime between 1775 and 1776. (Note: Also cited as 1777.) Around 1796, Scott married Robert Hall (1763–1824), a Scottish military surgeon and later writer and translator, in Linton, Roxburghshire.

Hall was a contributor on literary and scientific topics to Olinthus Gregory's Pantologia, William Nicholson's British Encyclopedia, and Rees's Cyclopædia; also to John Aikin's Old Monthly, and Knight's Printing Machine. She wrote the notes to Anton Zacharias Helms's Buenos Ayres (1806). During her later years she contributed to the Annual Biography, the Westminster Review, and Fraser's Magazine.

In fiction, she published Rural Recreations; Obstinacy (1826), a tale for young people; First and Last Years of Wedded Life, a story of Irish life in the reign of George IV; and a historical novel based on the massacre of Glencoe.

Hall translated the Travels of F. R. J. De Pons (1807), Jean Baptiste Bory de Saint-Vincent, Michel Ange Bernard de Mangourit (Travels in Hanover), Aubin-Louis Millin de Grandmaison and François Pouqueville (1813), Goldberry and Michaux. Other translations included Vittorio Alfieri's Autobiography (1810), Madame de Genlis's historical romance La Duchesse de La Vallière (1804), and some other works by the same writer, and some of the tales of August Heinrich Lafontaine.

Her time in the literary world brought her in particular the acquaintance of John Stuart Mill; but her financial difficulties were serious, and she applied in particular to the Royal Literary Fund.

On 24 November 1846, Hall died aged 70 in Somers Town, London.

== Bibliography ==
=== Fiction ===
- St. Clair, Rosalia (1819). Son of O'Donnel: a Novel. London: A. K. Newman and Co. ISBN 3-628-48501-0.
- St. Clair, Rosalia (1820). The Highland Castle, and the Lowland Cottage: a Novel. London: A. K. Newman and Co. ISBN 3-628-48497-9.
- St. Clair, Rosalia (1822). Clavering Tower: A Novel. In 4 Volumes. London: A. K. Newman and Co. ISBN 3-628-48492-8.
- St. Clair, Rosalia (1824). The Banker's Daughters of Bristol: or Compliance and Decision. A Novel. In Three Volumes. London: A. K. Newman and Co. ISBN 3-628-48595-9.
- St. Clair, Rosalia (1827). Fashionables and Unfashionables: a Novel. London: A. K. Newman and Co. ISBN 3-628-48495-2.
- St. Clair, Rosalia (1827). The First and Last Years of Wedded Life: a Novel. London: A. K. Newman and Co. ISBN 3-628-48496-0.
- St. Clair, Rosalia (1828). Ulrica of Saxony; A Romantic Tale of the Fifteenth Century. London: A. K. Newman and Co. ISBN 3-628-48502-9.
- St. Clair, Rosalia (1829). Eleanor Ogilvie: The Maid of the Tweed; A Romantic Legend. London: A. K. Newman and Co. ISBN 3-628-48494-4.
- St. Clair, Rosalia (1830). The Sailor Boy: or, The Admiral and His Protegee; a Novel. London: A. K. Newman and Co. ISBN 3-628-48499-5.
- St. Clair, Rosalia (1831). The Soldier Boy: or, The Last of the Lyals; a Novel. London: A. K. Newman and Co. ISBN 3-628-48500-2.
- St. Clair, Rosalia (1832). The Doomed One: or, They Met at Glenlon; a Tale of the Highlands. London: A. K. Newman and Co. ISBN 3-628-48493-6.
- St. Clair, Rosalia (1834). The Pauper Boy: or, The Ups and Downs of Life; a Novel. London: A. K. Newman and Co. ISBN 3-628-48498-7.
- By a lady (1835). Marston: A Novel, In Three Volumes. London: Thomas Hookham.
