= Margaret Cullen =

Scottish novelist

Margaret Cullen (1767—18 September 1837) was a Scottish novelist.

Cullen was born in Glasgow in 1767. Cullen was born to Anna Johnston and the professor of medicine William Cullen. Her sister Robina married John Craig Millar, the son of the philosopher John Millar and emigrated to the state of Pennsylvania in 1795. Robina was a frequent correspondent of the physician and activist Benjamin Rush and wrote to him of the success of Cullen's novel Home. Rush replied to her that Home was being "universally read" in America.

Cullen shared an annual government pension of £200 (equivalent to £26,072 in 2025) with her two sisters upon her father's death in 1790. Cullen lived with her sisters for most her life in England.

Cullen died in Ilfracombe, Devon, on 18 September 1837.

== Works ==
Cullen wrote two novels; Home (1802), and Mornton (1814). The authors of the Biographical Dictionary of Scottish Women describes her work as suggesting a "reforming outlook and a committed interest in the condition of women" with Home a "didactic and provocative attack on the existing laws of inheritance, influenced by her own awareness of women's financial vulnerability". Home reflected the poverty experienced by Cullen and her sisters after their father's death and their family tensions. Mornton is notable for an extensive debate on the rights of animals, written in the wake of the failure of Lord Thomas Erskine's animal cruelty bill in the House of Lords.

== Bibliography ==
- Margaret Cullen (1802). Home: A Novel. J. Mawman.
- Margaret Cullen (1829). Mornton: A Novel. Saunders & Otley.

== External sites ==
- Corvey Women Writers on the Web author page
