= Caroline Matilda Warren Thayer =

American educator and author

- Born: Caroline Matilda Warren c. 1785; Worcester, Massachusetts, US
- Died: 1844 (aged 58–59); Harrisonburg, Louisiana, US
- Spouse: James Thayer

Caroline Matilda Warren Thayer (c. 1785–1844) was an American educator, novelist, and children's writer.

== Biography ==
Caroline Matilda Warren was born in Worcester, Massachusetts, circa 1785 to Roby Hathaway and William Warren. She was related to the Bunker Hill revolutionary General Joseph Warren. She married James Thayer on April 10, 1809, in Sutton, Massachusetts. The couple had several children who died in infancy and one son who fought and died at the Battle of the Alamo. Her husband also died young.

Thayer worked as an educator and writer focused on religion. She opened a school on Canandaigua Lake in 1818 and in 1819, became the superintendent of the female division of Wesleyan Seminary in New York City.

Her stay with the Wesleyan Seminary ended when she was dismissed for her associations with New Jerusalem Church in 1821. From there Thayer moved to Joseph Hoxie’s Academy in New York City for several years before moving to teach in Kentucky in 1824. She then became the Governess of Elizabeth Female Academy in Mississippi before opening her own school in Port Gibson in 1831. Later Thayer became the principal of a women's department in Mississippi College.

Thayer died in 1844 and was buried in Harrisonburg, Louisiana.

== Publications ==
- The Gamesters
- Religion Recommended to Youth, in a Series of Letters
- Elegy
- Reflections
- Stanzas
- Ode to Cause of the Greeks
- The Miracle Spring
- First Lessons in the History of the United States
- The Widow's Son
