= François Guillaume Ducray-Duminil =

French writer

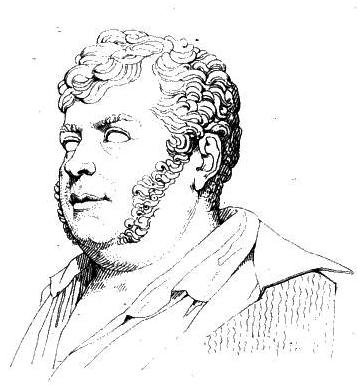
Drawing of a bust of Ducray-Duminil by Romanesi

François Guillaume Ducray-Duminil (1761, in Paris – 29 October 1819, in Ville-d'Avray) was a French novelist, poet and songwriter.

== Career ==
Born in Paris, from 1790 onward, Ducray-Duminil was the literary editor of Les Petites Affiches where he was known for the great forbearance of his reviews. A member of several literary societies, most notably of the Société du Caveau, he wrote poetry and lyrics as well as a few plays that were never produced.

He is best known as a writer for children and young adults, a genre in which he became extremely popular. Worried about the moral message of his works, he saw to it that virtue and innocence should prevail after a series of ingenious twists in the plot.

In Les Misérables Victor Hugo refers to his works as "stupid romances" which the favourite reading of Madame Thénardier. Critics ridiculed his style and syntax, but he mainly aimed at clarity, an essential quality considering the type of audience he was addressing. His imagination was fertile, and the enduring success of his work is largely due to his talent as a story-teller. Many playwrights borrowed from his plots.

He died in Ville-d'Avray.

== Works ==
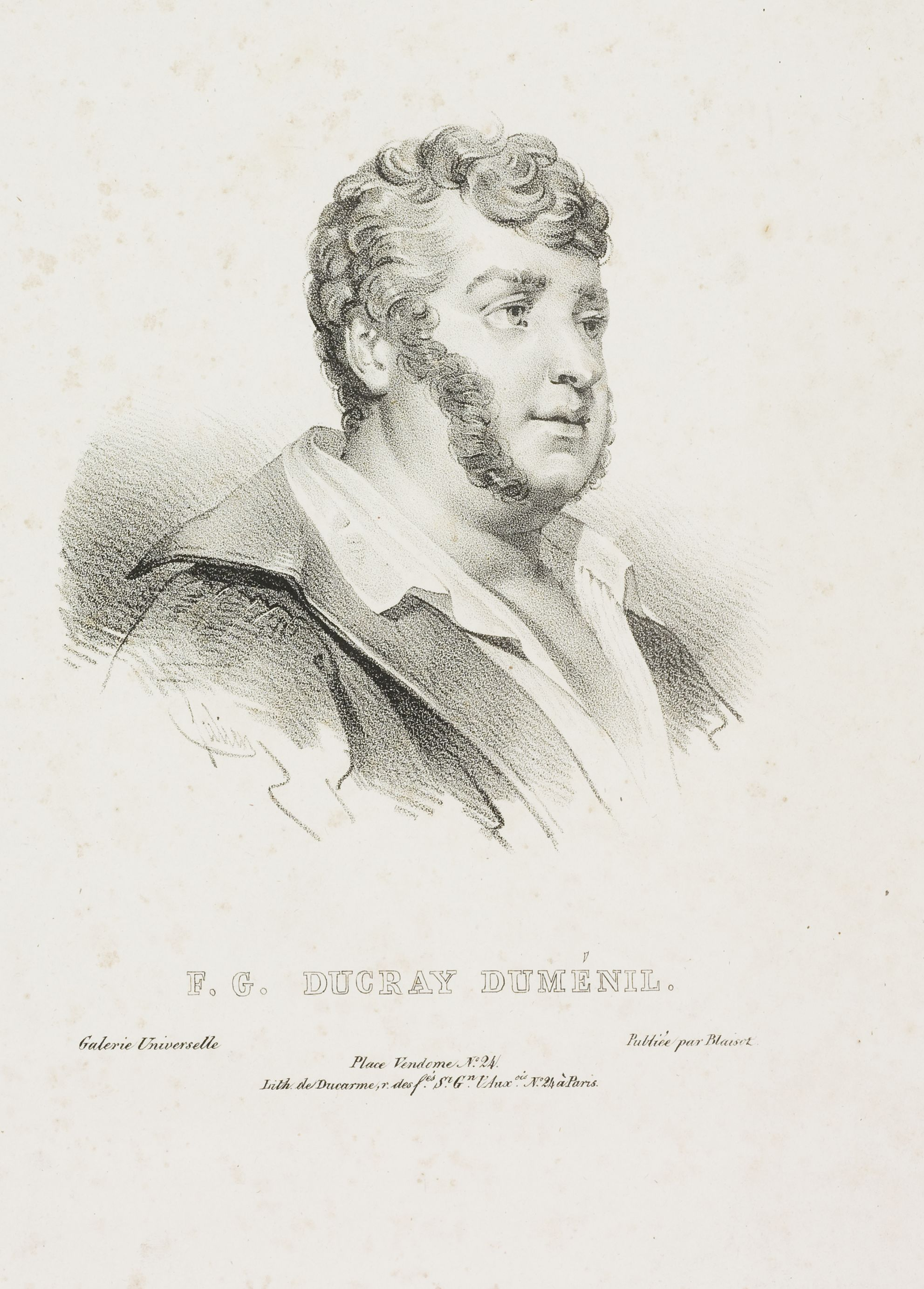
F.G. Ducray-Duminil

Most of his novels ran into several editions, for example : Lolotte et Fanfan, ou Histoire de deux enfants abandonnés dans une île déserte (Lolotte and Fanfan, the Story of Two Children Abandoned on a Desert Island ) ( Paris, 1788, 4 vol. in-12); Alexis, ou la Maisonnette dans les bois (Alexis or the small house in the woods) (1789, 4 vol. in-12); Petit Jacques et Georgette, ou les Petits montagnards auvergnats (The Little Mountaineers of Auvergne, Or, The Adventures of James and Georgette) (1791, 4 vol. in-12); Victor, ou l’Enfant de la forêt (Victor, a Child of the Forest) (1797, 4 vol. in-12) (available at Gutenberg.org); Cœlina, ou l'Enfant du mystère (Celina, or the Mystery Child)(1798, 5 vol. in-12), one of his two most popular works; les Cinquante Francs de Jeannette (Jeanette's Fifty Francs) (1798/9, 2 vol. in-12); les Petits orphelins du hameau (The young orphans from the hamlet) (1800), 4 vol. in-12; Paul, ou la Ferme abandonnée (Paul or the abandoned farmstead) (1800, 4 vol. in-12; Elmonde, ou la Fille de l’hospice (Edmonde, the charity girl) (1804, 5 vol. in-12); Jules, ou le Toit paternel (Jules, or Under his father's roof) (1804, 4 vol. in-12); le Petit Carillonneur (The small bellringer) (1809, 4 vol. in-12); Jean et Jeannette, ou les Petits aventuriers parisiens (Jean and Jeanette, Two Young Adventurers in Paris) (1816, 4 vol. in-12), L'Hermitage Saint-Jacques ou Dieu, le Roi et la Patrie, (Saint James's Hermitage; or For God, King and Country) 1815, etc.

His other works include a poem upon the death of the duke of Brunswick (Poème sur la mort du duc de Brunswick) (1787, in-8°); la Semaine mémorable ou Tableau de la révolution depuis le 12 juin 1789 (1789, in-18); Codicille sentimental, ou recueil de discours, contes, anecdotes, idylles, romances et poésies fugitives (1793, 2 vol. in-12); Soirées de la chaumière (1794, 8 vol. in-18, which ran into several editions); les Veillées de ma grand’mère, nouveaux contes de fées (1799, 2 vol. in-18); Journées au village, ou Tableau d'une bonne famille (1804, 8 vol. in-18); le Bon oncle et les neveux, annuaire moral (1812, in-18); Contes de Fées (1817, vol. in-18), etc.

== Bibliography ==
- Michel Manson, Les Livres pour l'enfance et la jeunesse sous la Révolution, Paris, INRP, 1989, pp. 85–89
- Gustave Vapereau, Dictionnaire universel des littératures, Paris, Hachette, 1876, p. 666
