= William Lane (bookseller) =

English publisher and bookseller (1746–1814)

- Born: 1746; Kingdom of Great Britain
- Died: 1814 (aged 67–68); United Kingdom of Great Britain and Ireland
- Occupations: Publisher, bookseller

William Lane (1746 – 1814) was an English publisher and bookseller in London, best known now for his founding of the wildly successful Minerva Press.

== Career ==
Around 1790, Lane established the Minerva Printing Press in Cree Church Lane, Leadenhall Street, moving c. 1792 to no. 31 Leadenhall Street. The Minerva Press issued works by Courtney Melmoth and others. Subscribers to Lane's Circulating Library (established circa 1774) included Leigh Hunt. (Note: Competitors included circulating libraries of John Booth, Carpenter, Cawthorn, Cheesewright, Creighton, Thomas Dangerfield, Dutton, William Earle, Thomas Hookham, David Ogilvy, Parson, Tegg, and Thomas Vernor.) Around 1799 John Darling and Anthony King Newman joined Lane as "Lane, Darling, Newman & Co." In 1804 Lane retired and Newman took over the business.

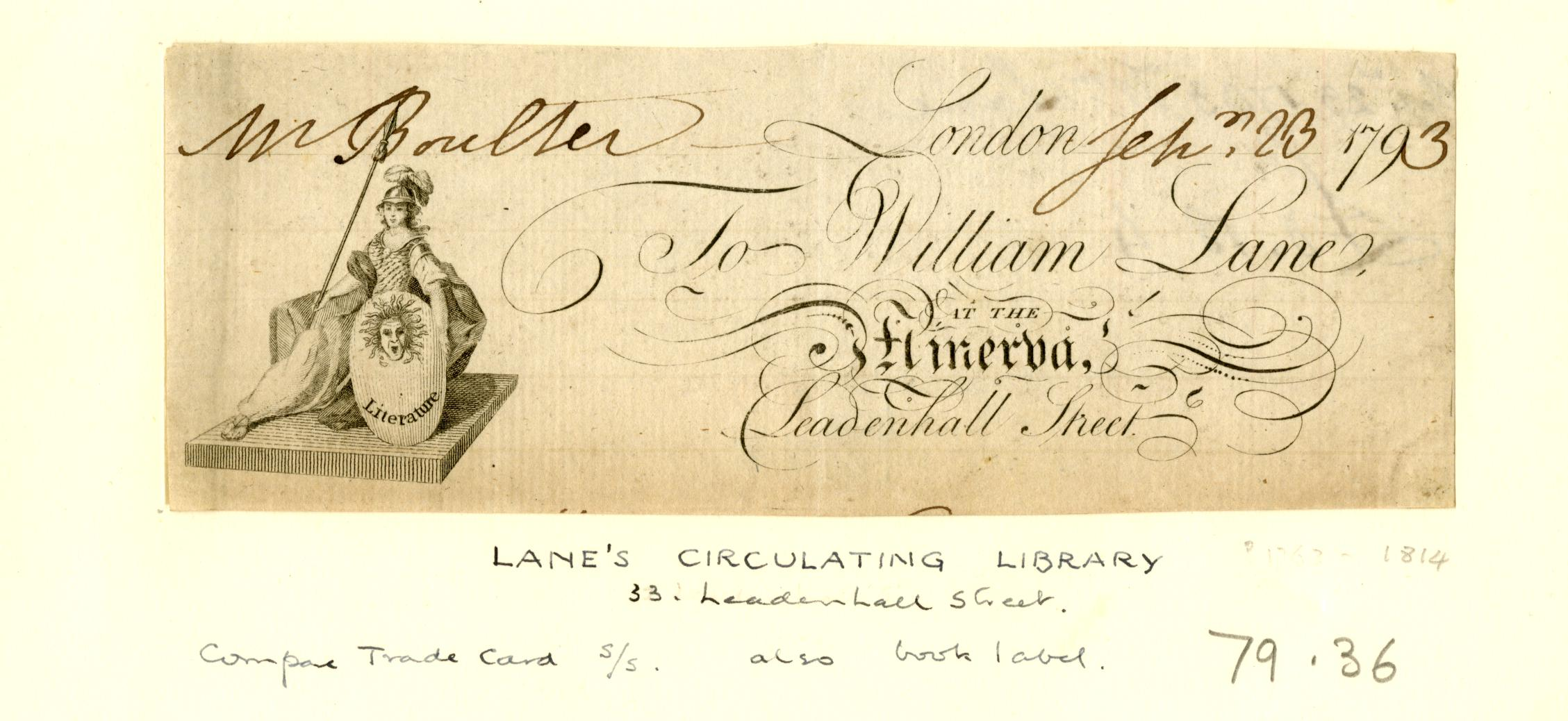
Trade card, Lane's Circulating Library, 1793

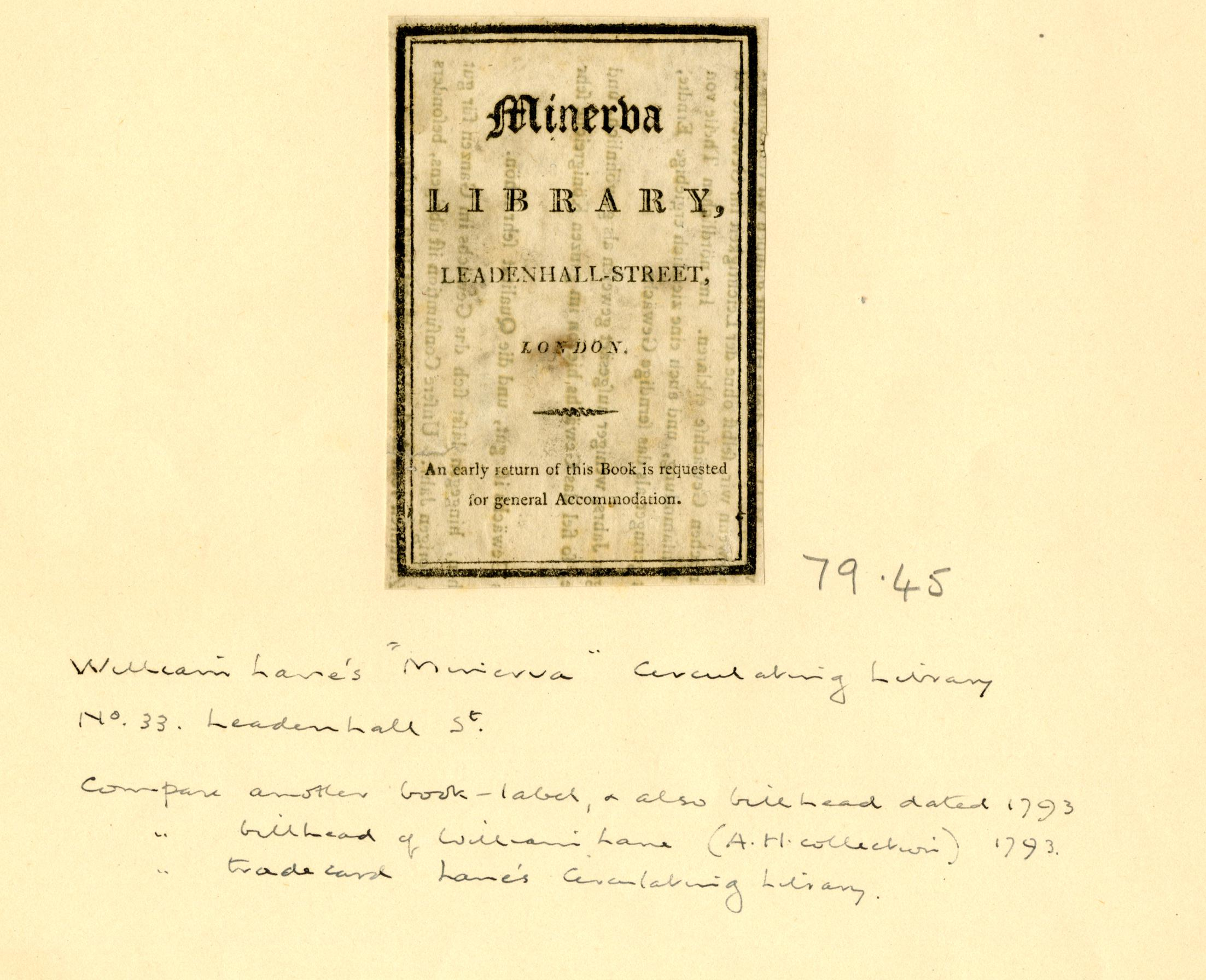
Trade card, Lane's Circulating Library, c. 1795

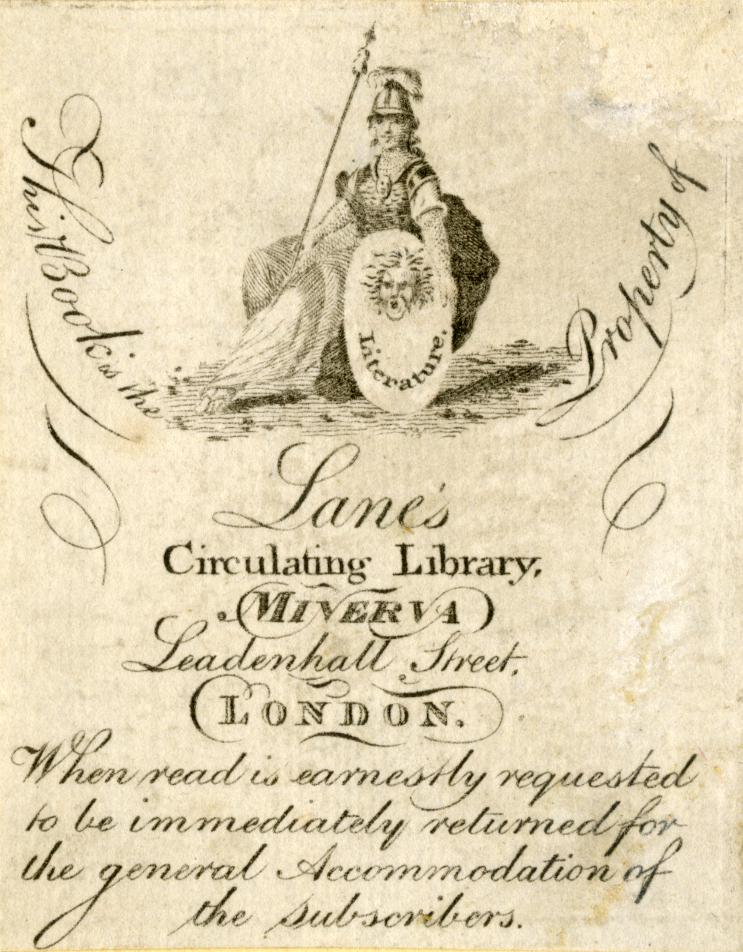
Trade card, Lane's Circulating Library, c. 1795

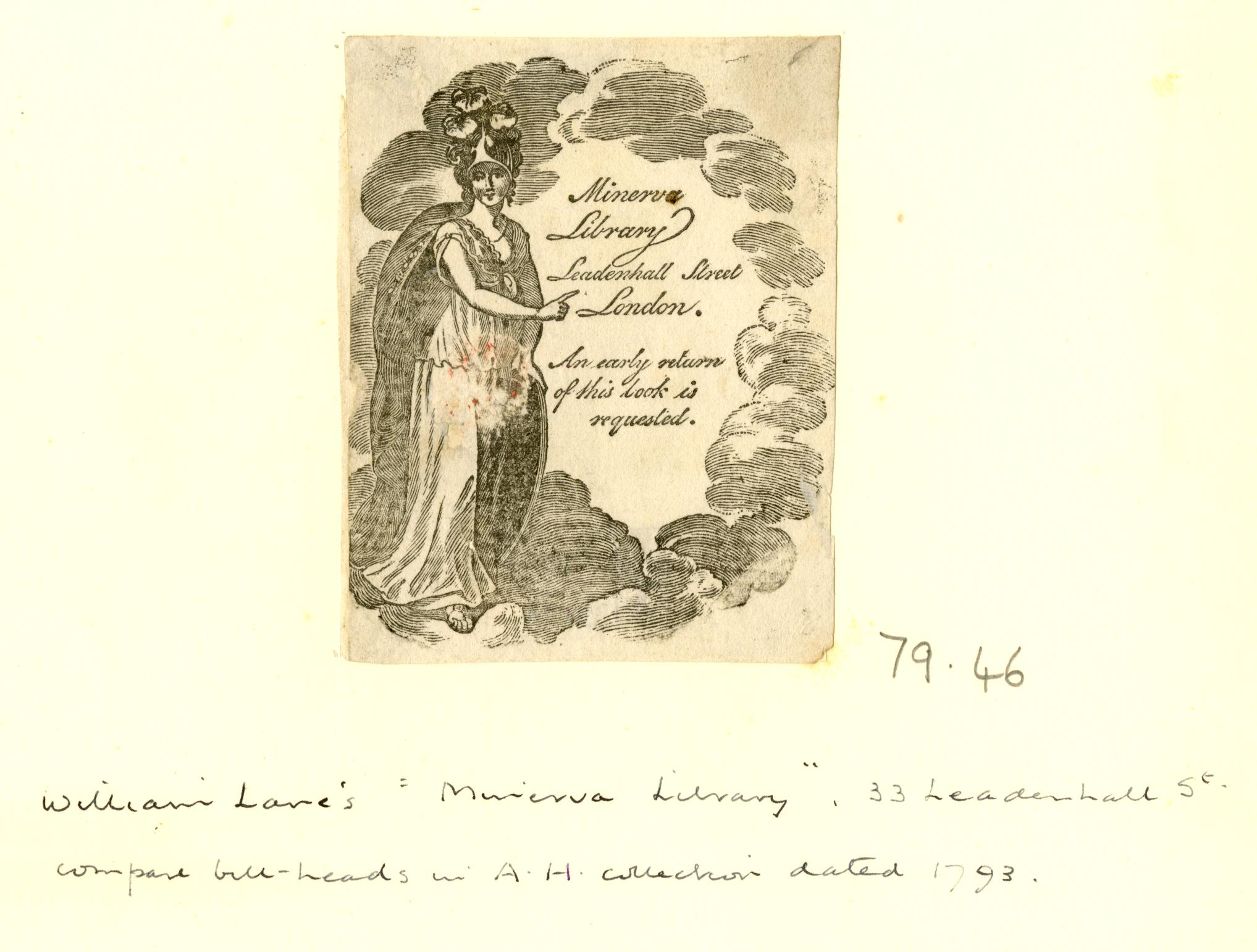
Trade card, Minerva Library, c. 1795

== See also ==
- List of Minerva Press authors
- Minerva Press
