= Minerva Press =

Defunct English publishing house for fiction

- Status: Defunct
- Founder: William Lane
- Country of origin: United Kingdom
- Headquarters location: London, England
- Distribution: United Kingdom
- Publication types: Books

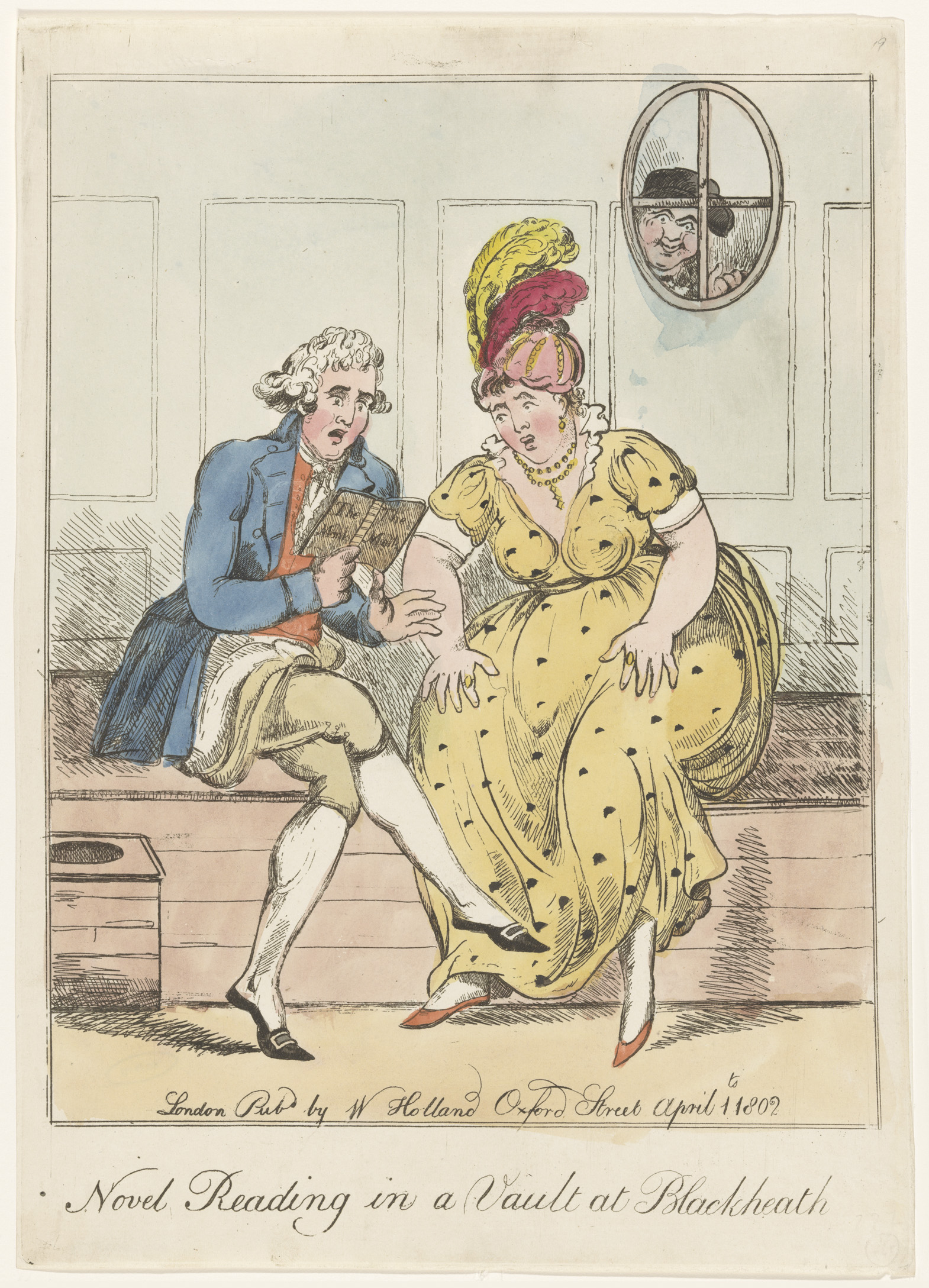
This 1802 caricature of a couple reading Matthew Lewis's The Monk in the water closet satirizes readers of "horrid" (i.e. Gothic) novels. (Rijksmuseum)

Minerva Press was a publishing house, notable for creating a lucrative market in sentimental and Gothic fiction, active in the late 18th and early 19th centuries (1790–1820). It was established by William Lane (c. 1745–1814) at No 33 Leadenhall Street, London, when he moved his circulating library there in about 1790.

== Publications ==
The Minerva Press was hugely successful in its heyday, though it had a reputation for sensationalism among readers and critics, and for sharp business practices among some of its competitors. At the peak of its success, however, the press was "the most prolific fiction-producer of the age."

Many of Lane's regular writers were women, including Regina Maria Roche (The Maid of Hamlet, 1793; Clermont, 1798); Eliza Parsons (The Castle of Wolfenbach, 1793; The Mysterious Warning, 1796); E. M. Foster; and Eleanor Sleath (The Orphan of the Rhine, 1798) whose Gothic fiction is included in the list of seven "horrid novels" recommended by the character Isabella Thorpe in Jane Austen's Northanger Abbey. In fact, six of the Northanger Seven were published by Minerva. During this period women authors in general struggled to balance their profession with social pressures to be modest, and authors of sensation fiction were particularly vulnerable to such criticisms. Many Minerva titles were published anonymously, including such novels as Count Roderic's Castle (1794), The Haunted Castle (1794), The Animated Skeleton (1798), the five novels of Helen Craik, and The New Monk (1798),

After his retirement in 1804, Lane was succeeded as proprietor of the Minerva Press by his partner, Anthony King (A. K.) Newman, who gradually dropped the Minerva name from his title pages during the 1820s. Later books published by the press bear the imprint "A. K. Newman & Co." Authors such as Emma Parker ("Emma de Lisle") and Amelia Beauclerc, who wrote for Minerva Press in the 1800s, are obscure today, and the market for Minerva's books became negligible after the death of its charismatic founder.

== Valancourt Books reprints ==
Valancourt Books began reprinting Minerva Press titles in 2005, beginning with the anonymously published The Animated Skeleton (1798). They have gone on to reissue over twenty titles, most with scholarly introductions.

== Minerva Press Ltd. (1995–2002) ==
A close friend and fellow UCL student of Chris Martin, Tim Crompton looked at a copy of Philip Horky's book, (Note: The author is not Phillip Sidney Horky, a Professor of Ancient Philosophy, Durham University, who got a PhD, Classics, from University of Southern California in 2007.) Child's Reflections, Cold Play, published by a Minerva Press Ltd., a London, UK vanity publisher, with offices in India (Minerva Press India Pvt. Ltd., New Delhi) and the USA. The book title inspired the name Coldplay.

"Minerva Press Ltd., a UK vanity publisher with branches in India and the USA, was the subject of two exposes by the BBC. More than 40 authors sought redress from this company, alleging false promises, production of shoddy books, and general failure to fulfill contractual promises. When Minerva finally went bust, it left behind over £2 million in debt, as well as unpaid staff and multitudes of unhappy authors."

== See also ==
- List of Minerva Press authors
- Northanger Horrid Novels
