= List of early-modern British women novelists =

This is an alphabetical list of female novelists who were active in England and Wales, and the Kingdom of Great Britain and Ireland before approximately 1800.

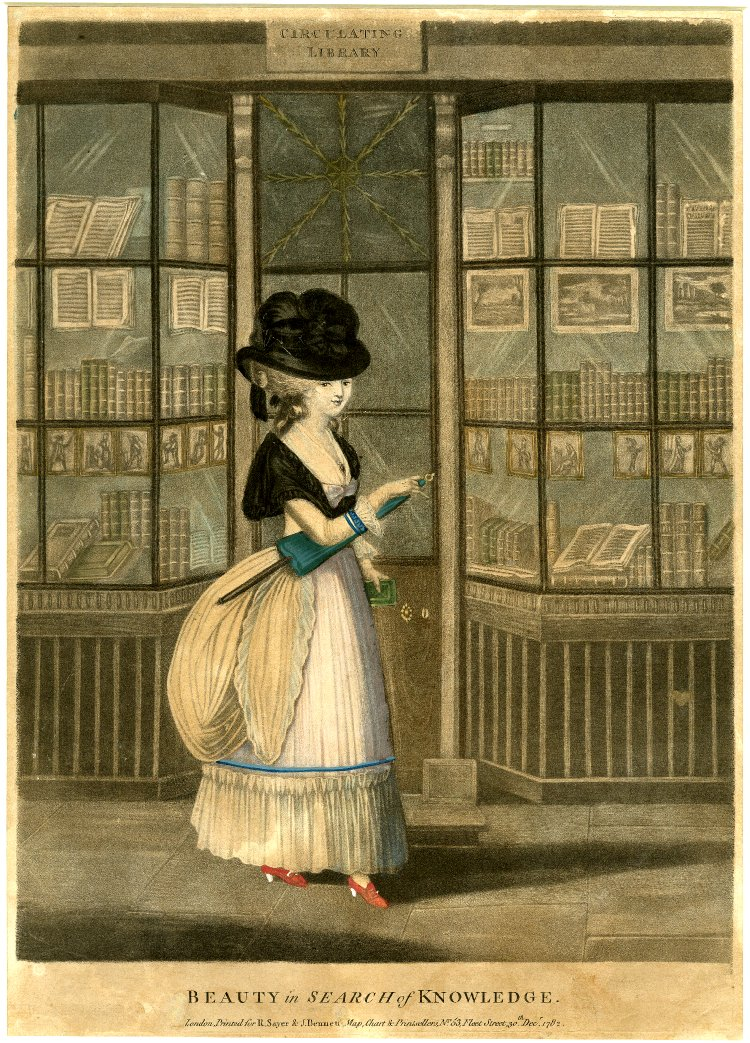
"Beauty in search of knowledge". (Young woman in front of a circulating library, where most readers accessed novels in the 18th century. Mezzotint, printed by R. Sayer & J. Bennett, London, 1782.)

== Novelists ==
=== A ===
- Penelope Aubin (c. 1658–1731)
- Jane Austen (1775–1817)

=== B ===
- Jane Barker (1652–1732)
- Mrs Barnby (fl. 1799–1804)
- Mrs. E. G. Bayfield
- Catharine Bayley (fl. 1810–1812)
- Amelia Beauclerc (fl. 1810s)
- Aphra Behn (1640–1689)
- Elizabeth Benger (1775–1827)
- Helena Berkenhout (fl. 1805)
- Anna Maria Bennett (c. 1750 – 1808)
- Elizabeth Blower (c. 1757/1763 – after 1816)
- Elizabeth Bonhôte (née Mapes; 1744–1818)
- Jeanne T. Bottens (fl. 1808)
- Sophia Bouverie (fl. 1808)
- Elizabeth Boyd (c. 1710 – 1745)
- Sophia Briscoe (fl. 1770s)
- Eliza Bromley (née Nugent; fl. 1784–1803)
- Charlotte Brooke (c. 1740–1793)
- Frances Brooke (1723–1789)
- Indiana Brooks (fl. 1789)
- Mary Brunton (1778–1818)
- Anne Bryton (fl. 1780)
- Mrs Bullock (fl. 1795–1801)
- Anne Burke (fl. 1780–1805)
- Caroline Burney (pseud; fl. 1809–1810)
- Frances Burney (1752–1840)
- Sarah Burney (1772–1844)
- Charlotte Susan Maria Bury (née Campbell; 1775–1861)
- Harriet Butler (fl. 1806–1807)
- Sarah Butler (c. 1689 – c. 1716)
- Medora Gordon Byron (1790–1858)

=== C ===
- Lady Mary C. (fl. 1797)
- Mary Ann Canning (fl. 1778)
- Mrs H. Cartwright (fl. 1776–1787)
- Mrs Carver (fl. 1797–1800)
- Mary Ann Cavendish-Bradshaw (c. 1758–1849)
- Margaret Cavendish (1623–1673)
- Mary Champion de Crespigny (née Clarke; c. 1749 – 1812)
- Charlotte Charke (née Cibber; 1713–1760)
- Mary Charlton (fl. 1794–1824)
- Harriet Chilcot (later Meziere; 1754–1784)
- Emily Frederick Clark (fl. 1798–1833)
- Elizabeth Cobbold (née Knipe; 1767–1824)
- Jane Collier (1714–1755)
- Mary Collyer (née Mitchell; c. 1716 – 1763)
- Mrs Colpoys (fl. 1801)
- Maria Susanna Cooper (1737–1807)
- Cordelia Cordova (fl. 1809)
- Helen Craik (c. 1751 – 1825)
- Mrs Croffts (fl. 1798–1801)
- Margaret Cullen (1767—1837)
- Catherine Cuthbertson (c. 1775 – 1842)

=== D ===
- Charlotte Dacre (née King, later Byrne; pseud. Rosa Matilda; 1782?–1825)
- Anne Seymour Damer (née Conway; 1748–1828)
- Selina Davenport (1779–1859)
- Mary Davys (1674–1732)
- Anne Dawe (fl. 1770)
- Thomasine Dennis (fl. 1806)
- Ann Doherty (c. 1786–c. 1832)
- Sarah Draper (fl. 1796)
- Camilla Dufour (fl. 1803)

=== E ===
- Anne Eden (fl. 1790)
- Maria Edgeworth (1768–1849)
- Jane Elson (fl. 1800–1802)

=== F ===
- Eliza Fenwick (née Jaco; 1767–1840)
- Susan Edmonstone Ferrier (1782–1854)
- Sarah Fielding (1710–1768)
- Matilda Fitz John (fl. 1796)
- E. M. Foster (fl. 1795–1810)
- Sophia Frances (fl. 1806–1809)
- Anne Fuller (died 1790)

=== G ===
- Phebe Gibbes (died 1805)
- Mary Goldsmith (fl. 1804)
- Ann Gomersall (1750—1835)
- Elizabeth Sarah Gooch (1757–1807)
- Sarah Green (fl. 1790–1825)
- Elizabeth Griffith (1727–1793)
- Susannah Gunning (née Minifie; 1740–1800)

=== H ===
- Ann Mary Hamilton (fl. 1806–1813)
- Elizabeth Hamilton (1756 or 1758 – 1816)
- Mary Hamilton (née Leslie; 1736–1821)
- Mary Ann Hanway (fl. 1776–1814)
- Martha Harley (later Hugill; fl. 1786–1797)
- Jane Harvey (1771–1848)
- Ann Julia Hatton (née Kemble; 1764–1838)
- Laetitia Matilda Hawkins (1759–1835)
- Mary Hays (1759–1843)
- Eliza Haywood (1693–1756)
- Mary Hearne (? fl. 1718)
- Elizabeth Helme (née Horrobin; 1743–1814)
- Elizabeth Hervey (née Marsh; 1748 – c. 1820)
- Mary Hill (fl. 1809–1813)
- Augusta Ann Hirst (fl. 1807)
- Barbara Hofland (née Wreaks; 1770–1844)
- Fanny Holcroft (1780–1844))
- Margaret Holford (1757–1834)
- Margaret Holford (1778–1852)
- Esther Holsten (fl. 1801–1803)
- Sarah Ann Hook (fl. 1803–1804)
- Ann Howell (fl. 1787–1797)
- Anne Rice Hughes (fl. 1786–1795)
- Maria Hunter (fl. 1772–1778)
- Rachel Hunter (c. 1754 – 1813)
- Margaret Hurry (fl. 1795–1809)

=== I ===
- Elizabeth Inchbald (1753–1821)
- Mrs Issacs (fl. 1801–1820)

=== J ===
- Frances Jacson (1754–1842)
- Mrs. Johnson (fl. 1786–1792)
- Harriet Jones (fl. 1799–1818)

=== K ===
- Susanna Keir (née Harvey; 1747–1802)
- Isabella Kelly (née Fordyce; 1759–1857)
- Ann Kendall (fl. 1798–1800)
- Anne Ker (née Phillips; 1766–1821)
- Dorothy Kilner (1755–1836)
- Mary Ann Kilner (née Maze; 1753–1831)
- Sophia King (c. 1781 – c. 1805)
- Cornelia Knight (1757–1837)

=== L ===
- Eliza Lake (fl. 1800–1806)
- Sarah Lansdell (fl. 1796–1798)
- Mary Latter (1725–1777)
- Harriet Lee (1757–1851)
- Sophia Lee (1750–1824)
- Elizabeth Le Fanu (1758–1837)
- Charlotte Lennox (née Ramsay; 1720–1804)
- Elizabeth Anne Le Noir (c. 1755–1841)
- Mrs Leslie (fl. 1801–1806)
- Alethea Lewis (1749–1827)
- Martha-Elizabeth Leycester (fl. 1788)

=== M ===
- Charlotte MacCarthy (fl. 1745–1768)
- Anna Maria Mackenzie (fl. 1782–1811)
- Miriam Malden (fl. 1804–1813)
- Delarivier Manley (1663 or c. 1670 – 1724)
- Jean Marishall (or Jane Marshall; fl. 1765–1788)
- Elizabeth Marsh (1735–1785)
- Mrs Martin (fl. 1798–1830)
- Mrs. Mathews (fl. 1793)
- Eliza Kirkham Mathews (née Kirkham Strong; 1772–1802)
- Charlotte Matthew (fl. 1793–1807)
- Anna Meades (born c. 1734)
- Elizabeth Meeke (1761–1826)
- Anna Millikin (1764– after 1849)
- Frances Mary Mills (fl. 1805)
- Margaret Minifie (1734–1803)
- Marianne Moore (fl. 1802–1803)
- Hannah More (1745–1833)
- Henrietta Mosse (née Rouvière; died 1835)
- Agnes Musgrave (fl. 1795–1808)

=== N ===
- Mary Anne Neri (fl. 1804–1808)
- Elizabeth Norman (fl. 1789)

=== O ===
- Susannah Oakes (fl. 1805)
- Amelia Opie (1769–1853)
- Anne Ormsby (fl. 1804–1805)
- Sydney Owenson (c. 1781? – 1859)

=== P ===
- Charlotte Palmer (c. 1762–1834 or after)
- Alicia Tindal Palmer (1763–1822)
- Mary Elizabeth Parker (fl. 1795–1802)
- Catherine Parry (died 1788)
- Eliza Parsons (née Phelp; 1739–1811)
- Mrs F. C. Patrick (fl. 1797–1799)
- Lucy Peacock (fl. 1785–1816)
- Sarah Pearson (1767–1833)
- Frances Peck (fl. 1804–1805)
- M. Peddle (fl. 1785)
- Janetta Philipps (fl. 1802–1811)
- Mary Pickar (fl. 1804–1805)
- Mary Pilkington (née Hopkins; 1761–1839)
- Mary Pix (1666–1709)
- Arabella Plantin (born c. 1700)
- Anne Plumptre (1760–1818)
- Elizabeth Plunkett (née Gunning; 1769–1823)
- Anna Maria Porter (1780–1832)
- Jane Porter (1776–1850)
- Elizabeth Purbeck (fl. 1789–1797)
- Jane Purbeck (fl. 1789–1802)
- Jael Pye (née Mendez; c. 1737 – 1782)

=== R ===
- Ann Radcliffe (née Ward; 1764–1823)
- Mary Ann Radcliffe (1746–1818)
- Eliza Ratcliffe (fl. 1808)
- Clara Reeve (1729–1807)
- Henrietta Rhodes (fl. 1811–1814)
- Mrs. Rice (fl. 1803–1807): author of The Deserted Wife (1803) and Monteith (1806)
- Catherine Eliza Richardson (née Scott; 1777–1853)
- Margaret Wade Roberts (fl. 1806–1809)
- Eliza Frances Robertson (1771–1805)
- Mary Robinson (1757–1800)
- Maria Elizabeth Robinson (1775–1818)
- Regina Maria Roche (1764–1845)
- Mrs Ross (fl. 1811–1817)
- Elizabeth Singer Rowe (1674–1737)
- Susanna Rowson (née Haswell; 1762–1824)
- Elizabeth Ryves (1750–1797)

=== S ===
- Charlotte Sanders/Saunders (fl. 1787)
- Maria Grace Saffery (1773–1858)
- Honoria Scott (fl. 1810–1822)
- Sarah Scott (1723–1795)
- Catharine Selden (fl. 1797)
- Mary Shelley (1797–1851)
- Frances Sheridan (1724–1766)
- Sarah Sheriffe (fl. 1800–1803)
- Mary Martha Sherwood (née Butt; 1775–1851)
- Mrs Showes (fl. 1797–1806)
- Caroline Sinclair (fl. 1809)
- Ann Masterman Skinn (1747–1789)
- Eleanor Sleath (1770–1847)
- Catharina Smith (fl. 1809–1815)
- Charlotte Smith (1749–1806)
- Julia Smith (fl. 1804–1805)
- Maria Lavinia Smith (fl. 1801)
- Elizabeth Somerville (née Helme; 1774–1840)
- Elizabeth Isabella Spence (1768–1832)
- Sarah Emma Spencer (fl. 1788)
- Helen St Victor (fl. 1808)
- Louisa Sidney Stanhope (fl. 1806–1827)
- Miss Street (fl. 1790–1793)
- Elizabeth Strutt (1782–1867)
- Augusta Amelia Stuart (fl. 1808–1812)

=== T ===
- Eliza Taylor (fl. 1779—1806)
- Jane Taylor (1783–1824)
- Maria Tharmott (fl. 1805)
- Ann Thomas (fl. 1784—1795)
- Elizabeth Thomas (née Wolferstan; 1770/71–1855)
- Anna (Harriet?) Thompson (fl. 1787–1807)
- Jane Timbury (died c. 1792, fl. 1770–1791)
- Elizabeth Sophia Tomlins (1763–1828)
- Anne Trelawney (fl. 1805)
- Sarah Trimmer (née Kirby; 1741–1810)
- Catharine Trotter Cockburn (1679–1749)
- Mary Tuck (fl. 1804)

=== V ===
- Harriet Ventum (fl. 1798–1814)

=== W ===
- Catherine George Ward (c. 1787)
- Jane Warton (1723–1809)
- Anna Weamys (fl. 1651)
- Helena Wells (later Whitford; 1761?–1824)
- Jane West (née Iliffe; 1758–1852)
- Sarah Scudgell Wilkinson (1779–1831)
- Helen Maria Williams (c. 1761 – 1827)
- Ann Wingrove (fl. 1795–1801)
- Mary Wollstonecraft (1759–1797)
- Sophia Woodfall (1780–1852)
- A. Woodfin (1736–1784)
- Augusta Maria Woodthorpe (fl. 1809)
- Elizabeth Wright (fl. 1801)
- Mary Wroth (née Sidney; 1587–1651/3)

=== Y ===
- Ann Yearsley (1752–1806)
- Mrs R.P.M. Yorke (fl. 1800–1805)
- Henrietta Maria Young (fl. 1809)
- Mary Julia Young (fl. 1788–1810)

== See also ==
- List of biographical dictionaries of women writers in English
- List of early-modern British women playwrights
- List of early-modern British women poets
- List of female poets
- List of feminist poets
- List of Minerva Press authors
- List of poets
- List of women rhetoricians
- List of women writers
- Lists of writers
- Mothers of the Novel: 100 Good Women Writers Before Jane Austen
- Oxford period poetry anthologies
- Women Writers Project
- Women's writing (literary category)

== Resources ==
- Backscheider, Paula, and John Richetti, eds. Popular Fiction by Women, 1660–1730: An Anthology. Oxford: OUP, 1996. (Internet Archive)
- Ballaster, Ros. Seductive Forms: Women's Amatory Fiction from 1684 to 1740. Clarendon Press, 1992.
- Blain, Virginia, et al., eds. The Feminist Companion to Literature in English. New Haven and London: Yale UP, 1990. (Internet Archive)
- Buck, Claire, ed.The Bloomsbury Guide to Women's Literature. Prentice Hall, 1992. (Internet Archive)
- Corman, Brian. Women Novelists Before Jane Austen: The Critics and Their Canons. University of Toronto Press, 2008. https://doi.org/10.3138/9781442689633
- Oxford Dictionary of National Biography. Oxford: OUP, 2004.
- Prescott, Sarah. Women, Authorship and Literary Culture, 1690–1740. Palgrave, 2003.
- Robertson, Fiona, ed. Women's Writing, 1778–1838. Oxford: OUP, 2001. (Internet Archive)
- Schellenberg, Betty A. The Professionalization of Women Writers in Eighteenth-Century Britain. Cambridge University Press, 2005. ISBN 0-521-85060-6.
- Schlueter, Paul, and June Schlueter. An encyclopedia of British women writers. Rutgers University Press, 1998. (Internet Archive)
- Spencer, Jane. The Rise of the Woman Novelist: From Aphra Behn to Jane Austen. 1986.
- Spender, Dale. Mothers of the novel: 100 good women writers before Jane Austen. London/NY:Pandora, 1986. (Internet Archive)
- Todd, Janet, ed. British Women Writers: a critical reference guide. London: Routledge, 1989. (Internet Archive)
- Todd, Janet. A Dictionary of British and American women writers, 1660–1800. Totowa, N.J.: Rowman & Allanheld, 1985. (Internet Archive)
- Williams, K. "Women Writers and the Rise of the Novel." The History of British Women's Writing, 1690–1750. Edited by R. Ballaster. Series: The History of British Women's Writing. Palgrave Macmillan, 2010. https://doi.org/10.1057/9780230298354_7
