= Mothers of the Novel: 100 Good Women Writers Before Jane Austen =

1986 feminist literary study

- Author: Dale Spender
- Cover artist: Marion Dalley
- Language: English
- Subject: Feminist literary history
- Publisher: Pandora Press, London, Routledge & Kegan Paul, New York
- Publication date: 1986
- Media type: print
- Pages: 357
- ISBN: 0863580815 9780863580819
- OCLC: 1036783258
- Dewey Decimal: 823/.009/9287
- LC Class: PR113 .S63 1986

Mothers of the Novel: 100 Good Women Writers Before Jane Austen (1986), by Dale Spender, is a foundational study for the reclamation project central to feminist literary studies in English in the late 1980s and 1990s.

== Mothers of the Novel ==
=== Part I ===
Mothers of the Novel is divided into three parts. Part I treats a series of seventeenth-century women writers, only some of whom would have been familiar to most readers in 1986: Aphra Behn (1640–1689), Margaret Cavendish (1623–1673), Anne Clifford (1590–1676), Anne Fanshawe (1625–1680), Eliza Haywood (1693–1756), Lucy Hutchinson (1618–1681), Delarivière Manley (1663 –1724), Katherine Philips (1631–1664), Anna Weamys (fl. 1651), and Mary Wroth (1587– 1653).

=== Part II ===
Part II includes a list of one hundred and six (106) early women novelists little-known at the time of writing, and the titles of 568 of their novels. Many of these works have since been reprinted and become subjects of academic study, though a proportion of these writers remain relatively obscure or, in some cases, unidentified.

- Penelope Aubin (c. 1658 – 1731)
- Jane Barker (1652–1732)
- Anna Maria Bennett (ca. 1750 – 1808)
- Elizabeth Bonhôte (née Mapes; 1744–1818)
- Elizabeth Boyd (c. 1710 – 1745)
- Sophia Briscoe (fl. 1770s)
- Eliza Bromley (née Nugent; fl. 1784 - 1803)
- Frances Brooke (1723–1789)
- Indiana Brooks (fl. 1789)
- Mary Brunton (1778-1818)
- Anne Burke (fl.1780-1805)
- Frances Burney (1752–1840)
- Sarah Burney (1770–1844)
- Charlotte Susan Maria Bury (1775-1861)
- Mary Martha Sherwood (née Butt; 1775–1851)
- Mary Champion de Crespigny (née Clarke; c. 1749 – 1812)
- Charlotte Charke (née Cibber; 1713–1760)
- Mary Charlton (fl. 1794–1824)
- Harriet Chilcot (later Meziere; 1754–1784)
- Emily Frederick Clark (fl. 1798–1833)
- Jane Collier (1714–1755)
- Mary Collyer (née Mitchell; c. 1716 – 1763)
- Anne Seymour Damer (née Conway; 1748–1828)
- Mary Davys (1674–1732)
- Anne Dawe (fl. 1770)
- Anne Eden (fl. 1790)
- Maria Edgeworth (1768-1849)
- Elisa Fenwick (née Jaco; 1767–1840)
- Sarah Fielding (1710-1768)
- E. M. Foster (fl. 1795–1810)
- Anne Fuller (died 1790)
- Phebe Gibbes (died 1805)
- Ann Gomersall (1750—1835)
- Sarah Green (fl. 1790–1825)
- Elizabeth Griffith (1727–1793)
- Susannah Gunning (née Minifie; 1740–1800)
- Elizabeth Hamilton (1756 or 1758–1816)
- Mary Hamilton (née Leslie; 1736-1821)
- Mary Ann Hanway (fl. 1776–1814)
- Martha Harley (later Hugill; fl. 1786–1797)
- Laetitia Matilda Hawkins (1759–1835)
- Mary Hays (1759—1843)
- Elizabeth Helme (née Horrobin; 1743-1814)
- Elizabeth Hervey (née Marsh; 1748 – c. 1820)
- Ann Howell (fl. 1787–1797)
- Anne Rice Hughes (fl. 1786–1795)
- Maria Hunter (fl. 1772–1778)
- Elizabeth Inchbald (1753–1821)
- Susanna Keir (née Harvey; 1747–1802)
- Isabella Kelly (née Fordyce; 1759–1857)
- Anne Ker (née Phillips; 1766–1821)
- Sophia King (c. 1781 – c. 1805)
- Cornelia Knight (1757–1837)
- Sarah Lansdell (fl. 1796–1798)
- Mary Latter (1725–1777)
- Harriet Lee (1757–1851)
- Sophia Lee (1750–1824)
- Charlotte Lennox (née Ramsay; 1720–1804)
- Charlotte MacCarthy (fl. 1745-68)
- Anna Maria Mackenzie (fl. 1782–1811)
- Jean Marishall (or Jane Marshall; fl. 1765–1788)
- Eliza Kirkham Mathews (née Kirkham Strong; 1772–1802)
- Anna Meades (born c. 1734)
- Elizabeth Meeke (1761–1826)
- Margaret Minifie (1734–1803)
- Hannah More (1745–1833)
- Elizabeth Norman (fl. 1789)
- Amelia Opie (1769–1853)
- Sydney Owenson (née Owenson; c. 1781? – 1859)
- Charlotte Palmer (c. 1762–1834 or after)
- Mary Elizabeth Parker (fl. 1795–1802)
- Catherine Parry (died 1788)
- Eliza Parsons (née Phelp; 1739–1811)
- Sarah Pearson (1767–1833)
- M. Peddle (fl. 1785)
- Mary Pilkington (née Hopkins; 1761–1839)
- Mary Pix (1666–1709)
- Arabella Plantin (born c. 1700)
- Elizabeth Plunkett (née Gunning; 1769–1823)
- Ann Radcliffe (née Ward; 1764–1823)
- Mary Ann Radcliffe (1746–1818)
- Clara Reeve (1729–1807)
- Mary Robinson (1757–1800)
- Regina Maria Roche (1764–1845)
- Elizabeth Singer Rowe (1674–1737)
- Susanna Rowson (née Haswell; 1762–1824)
- Elizabeth Ryves (1750–1797)
- Charlotte Sanders/Saunders (fl. 1787)
- Sarah Scott (1723–1795)
- Frances Sheridan (1724–1766)
- Ann Masterman Skinn (1747–1789)
- Eleanor Sleath (1770–1847)
- Charlotte Smith (1749–1806)
- Sarah Emma Spencer (fl. 1788)
- Eliza Taylor (fl. 1779—1806)
- Jane Timbury (died c. 1792; fl. 1770–1791)
- Elizabeth Sophia Tomlins (1763–1828)
- Jane Warton (1723–1809)
- Jane West (née Iliffe; 1758–1852)
- Helena Wells (later Whitford; 1761?–1824)
- Helen Maria Williams (c. 1761 – 1827)
- Mary Wollstonecraft (1759–1797)
- A. Woodfin (1736–1784)
- Ann Yearsley (1752–1806)
- Mary Julia Young (fl. 1788–1810)

=== Part III ===
Part III treats a series of late-eighteenth- and early-nineteenth-century writers from the list: Mary Brunton, Frances Burney, Maria Edgeworth, Sarah Fielding, Mary Hays, Elizabeth Inchbald, Charlotte Lennox, Amelia Opie, Sydney Owenson, Ann Radcliffe, Charlotte Smith, and Mary Wollstonecraft.

== Mothers of the Novel series ==
Pandora Press released a companion "Mothers of the Novel" series of twenty novels by sixteen authors between 1986 and 1989:

- Mary Brunton, Discipline (1815; repr. 1986) ISBN 0-86358-105-6
- Mary Brunton, Self-control (1810/11; repr. 1986) ISBN 0-86358-084-X
- Frances Burney, The Wanderer; or Female Difficulties (1814; repr. 1988) ISBN 0-86358-263-X
- Maria Edgeworth, Belinda (1801; repr. 1986) ISBN 0-86358-074-2
- Maria Edgeworth, Helen (1834; repr. 1987) ISBN 0-86358-104-8
- Maria Edgeworth, Patronage (1814; repr. 1986) ISBN 0-86358-106-4
- Eliza Fenwick, Secrecy, or The Ruin of the Rock (1795; repr. 1988) ISBN 0-86358-307-5
- Sarah Fielding, The Governess, or The Little Female Academy (1749; repr. 1987) ISBN 0-86358-182-X
- Mary Hamilton, Munster Village (1778; repr. 1987) ISBN 0-86358-133-1
- Mary Hays, Memoirs of Emma Courtney (1796; repr. 1987) ISBN 0-86358-132-3
- Eliza Haywood, The History of Miss Betsy Thoughtless (1751; repr. 1986) ISBN 0-86358-090-4
- Elizabeth Inchbald, A Simple Story (1791; repr. 1987) ISBN 0-86358-136-6
- Harriet Lee and Sophia Lee, The Canterbury Tales (1797–1805; repr. 1989) ISBN 0-86358-308-3
- Charlotte Lennox, The Female Quixote, or the Adventures of Arabella (1752; repr. 1986) ISBN 0-86358-080-7
- Sydney Owenson, The O’Briens and the O’Flahertys: A National Tale (1827; repr. 1988) ISBN 0-86358-289-3
- Sydney Owenson, The Wild Irish Girl (1806; repr. 1986) ISBN 0-86358-097-1
- Amelia Opie, Adeline Mowbray, or The Mother and Daughter (1804; repr. 1986) ISBN 0-86358-085-8
- Frances Sheridan, Memoirs of Miss Sidney Bidulph (1761; repr. 1987) ISBN 0-86358-134-X
- Charlotte Smith, Emmeline: The Orphan of the Castle (1788; repr. 1989) ISBN 0-86358-264-8
- Charlotte Smith, The Old Manor House (1793; repr. 1987) ISBN 0-86358-135-8

== See also ==
- List of early-modern British women novelists
- List of Minerva Press authors
- Women's writing (literary category)
