= Elizabeth Hervey (writer) =

British novelist (1748–1820)

- Born: Elizabeth March; 1748
- Died: 1820 (aged 71–72)
- Occupation: writer
- Spouse(s): Alexander Harvie; William Thomas Hervey
- Relatives: William Beckford (brother)
- Writing career
- Language: English
- Years active: 1788–1814

Elizabeth Hervey (1748–1820) was the author of seven novels, six of which were published and one of which exists "in a carefully-bound manuscript."

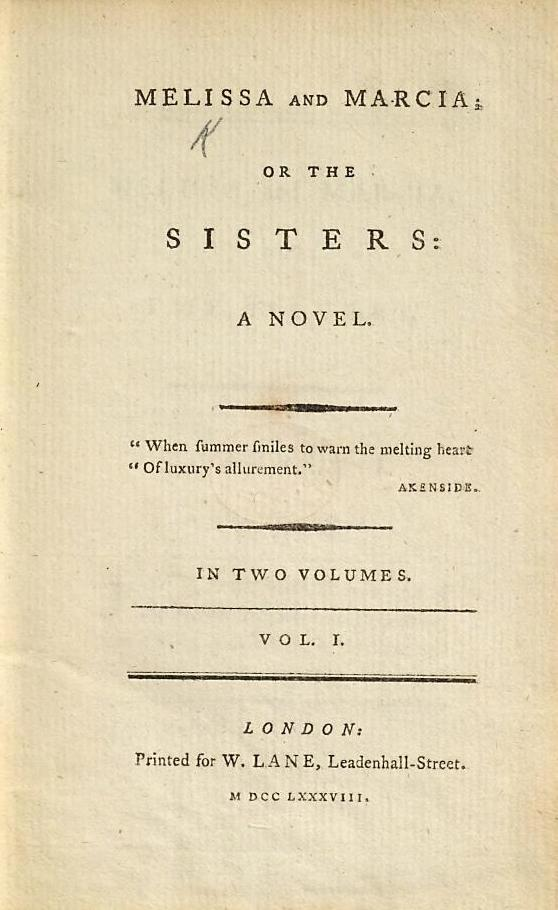
Title page of Elizabeth Hervey's Melissa and Marcia; or The Sisters: A Novel. Vol. I. London: W. Lane, 1788.

== Life ==
Elizabeth March was the daughter of Maria Hamilton (7 January 1725 – 22 July 1798), daughter of George Hamilton (MP for Wells) and granddaughter of the sixth earl of Abercorn, and Francis March, a "Jamaican planter and City man." After the death of her father, her mother married wealthy planter, slave-owner and politician William Beckford. While still in her teens, March married Alexander Harvie, a business associate of her stepfather's who died in 1765 and left her a widow at the age of seventeen. Her second marriage was also brief: in 1774 she married Col William Thomas Hervey and had two sons before Hervey either died or the marriage ended in 1778, while the family was living abroad due to debt. In 1789, Hervey was reported to have been living in Brussels and having an affair with poet and radical Robert Merry, with whom she apparently maintained a friendly relationship after they parted. Merry was a leading force in the Della Cruscan literary movement who came in for considerable criticism for their literary mannerisms.

Hervey was the elder half-sister of wealthy art collector and writer William Beckford. The siblings corresponded when young, but would seem to have been less close when older: in 1797 Beckford published a "marked burlesque attack on women's writing": Azemia: A Descriptive and Sentimental Novel. Interspersed with Pieces of Poetry. Azemia satirized women authors of sentimental novels including Mary Champion de Crespigny, Susannah Gunning, Hannah More, Mary Robinson — also associated with the Della Cruscans — and Hervey herself. The incident apparently caused her "much upset," though modern commentators tend to agree that Hervey is less deserving of the criticism than some of Beckford's other targets.

== Work ==
Hervey's first five novels were all published anonymously, which has at times led to difficulties for bibliographers: her second novel, Louisa (1790) has been erroneously attributed to Jane West. Her third novel, The history of Ned Evans (1796), is a fictional captivity narrative which also treats the Irish nationalist movement. Her final novel, Amabel; or, Memoirs of A Woman of Fashion (1814), her only work to debut under her own name, was dedicated to the queen.

Her novels went into multiple editions and at least four of them were translated into French: The history of Ned Evans, The church of St. Siffrid, The Mourtray Family, and Amabel. Hervey's publishing career was book-ended by the Minerva Press: both her first novel, and the second edition of her sixth and final novel, were published by that well-known company.

Hervey was one of the 106 "lost" women writers Dale Spender listed in Mothers of the Novel in 1986.

=== Novels ===
- Melissa and Marcia; or the sisters: a novel. In two volumes. London: William Lane, 1788; 2nd ed. 1796.
- Louisa. A novel, in three volumes. By the author of Melissa and Marcia; or, the sisters. London: Thomas Hookham, 1790. (Irish edition: Dublin: Wogan et al., 1790).
- The history of Ned Evans. In four volumes. London: G. G. and J. Robinson, 1796; 2nd ed. 1797. (Irish eds.: Dublin, 1796; 1797.)
- The church of St. Siffrid. In four volumes. London: G. G. and J. Robinson, 1797. (Irish ed.: Dublin: William Porter and Nicholas Kelly, 1798)
- The Mourtray Family. A novel. In four volumes. London: R. Faulder, 1800. (2nd ed.: 1810; 3rd ed.: London: Henry Colburn, 1814)
- Amabel; or, Memoirs of A Woman of Fashion. By Mrs. Hervey. Author of the Mourtray Family, &c. In Four Volumes. London: Henry Colburn, 1814. (2nd ed.: London: A. K. Newman and Co., 1818)

=== Etexts ===
- The Mourtray Family. 1800. (Full text, HathiTrust) (Google Books: Full text, 3rd ed. 1814, Vol. I, II, III, IV)
- Amabel; or, Memoirs of a woman of fashion. 1814. (Full text, HathiTrust)

== Notes and references ==
=== References ===
- Blain, Virginia, et al., eds. "Hervey, Elizabeth." The Feminist Companion to Literature in English. New Haven and London: Yale UP, 1990, p. 517. (Open access, Internet Archive)
- Brown, Susan, Patricia Clements, and Isobel Grundy. "Elizabeth Hervey." Orlando: Women’s Writing in the British Isles from the Beginnings to the Present. Ed. Susan Brown, Cambridge University Press. Cambridge UP, n.d. 22 Mar. 2013. Accessed 25 Oct. 2022.
- McConnell, Anita. "Beckford, William Thomas (1760–1844), writer and art collector." Oxford Dictionary of National Biography. 21. Oxford University Press. Accessed 26 Oct. 2022.
- Todd, Janet, ed. "Hervey, Elizabeth." A Dictionary of British and American women writers, 1660-1800. Totowa, N.J.: Rowman & Allanheld, 1985, pp. 162—163. (Open access, Internet Archive)
- "Hervey, Elizabeth." The Women's Print History Project, 2019, Person ID 201. Accessed 2022-10-25.

== See also ==
- Della Cruscans
- Mothers of the Novel
- List of Minerva Press authors
