= Anne Kerr =

Anne Kerr may refer to:

- Anne Stanley, Countess of Ancram (1600–1657), also Anne Kerr, English noblewoman
- Anne, Lady Kerr (1914–1997), Australian interpreter, second wife of the Governor-General of Australia, John Kerr
- Anne Kerr (politician) (1925–1973), UK politician
- Anne B. Kerr (fl. 2008), American academic
- Anne Ker (1766–1821), English romance and Gothic novelist
- Ann Maree Kerr (born 1967), Australian rhythmic gymnast
