= Susanna Harvey =

Susanna Harvey can refer to:

- Susanna Hopton née Harvey (1627–1709), an English devotional writer.
- Susanna Keir née Harvey (1747-1802), a British novelist
