= Gomersall =

Gomersall is an English surname. Notable people with the surname include:

- Ann Gomersall (1750–1835), British novelist
- Barry Gomersall (1945–2007), Australian rugby league referee
- Ben Gomersall (born 2006), Australian racing driver
- Frank Gomersall (1910–1987), British politician
- Stephen Gomersall, British diplomat and businessman
- Vic Gomersall (1942–2024), English footballer
