= Skinn =

Skinn is a surname. Notable people with the surname include:

- Ann Masterman Skinn (1747–1789), English novelist
- Dez Skinn (born 1951), British comic
- Tony Skinn (born 1983), Nigerian–American basketball player
