= Sarah Green (novelist) =

Irish-English novelist

- Occupation: Author
- Writing career
- Pen name: "a lady"; S.G.; Mrs S.G.
- Language: English
- Years active: 1790–1825
- Notable works: Romance Readers and Romance Writers: A Satirical Novel (1810)

Sarah Green (fl. 1790 – 1825) was an Irish-English author, one of the ten most prolific novelists of the first two decades of the nineteenth century.

== Life and writing ==
Green was probably born in Ireland and then later moved to London. Very little is known of her aside from what has been pieced together of her publishing history. She produced works in an array of genres: novels, tales, romances, and, notably, like Jane Austen, mock-romances. She also wrote at least one religious work, as well as conduct literature, a translation, and editing work. Eight of her works were published with the popular Minerva Press by William Lane or his successor, Anthony Newman. "It is ironic," one commentator has written, that her moral tract, Mental improvement for a young lady (1793) "condemns all novels save those of Fanny Burney." Later works, however, engage with a range of other writers: in Scotch Novel Reading (1824), in addition to Burney, Green variously refers to or evokes Lord Byron, Charlotte Dacre, Charlotte Lennox, Sydney Owenson, Ann Radcliffe, and Walter Scott. Her Private History of the Court of England (privately printed, 1808) is a fictionalized account of the life of writer Mary Robinson.

Initially Green published anonymously, but after 1810 she began to publish under her own name.

She is one of the "lost" women writers listed by Dale Spender in Mothers of the Novel: 100 Good Women Writers Before Jane Austen.

== Works ==
=== Novels ===
- [Anonymous]. Charles Henley: or, the fugitive restored. London: William Lane, 1790.
- Court intrigue, or the victim of constancy, an historical romance. In two volumes. By the author of Mental Improvement. London: Minerva Press, William Lane, 1799.
- Tankerville Family, in three volumes. By a lady. London: Robert Dutton; Clement Chapple, 1808.
- [Anonymous]. The Private History of the Court of England. In two volumes. London: Printed for the Author, and sold by B. Crosby & Co., 1808; 2nd corrected ed. 1808.
- Tales of the Manor. By the author of The Private History of The Court of England, &c. &c. In two volumes. London: Benjamin Crosby and Co., 1809.
- S.G. Romance Readers and Romance Writers: A Satirical Novel. In Three Vols. By the Author of A Private History of the Court of England, &c. London: T. Hookham, Junior, and E. T. Hookham, 1810.
- The Festival of St Jago. A Spanish Romance. In Two Volumes. By the author of The Tankerville Family ... &c. London: Minerva Press, A. K. Newman and Co., 1810.
- Mrs. S. G****. The Reformist!!! A Serio-Comic Political Novel. In Two Volumes. London: Minerva Press, A. K. Newman and Co., 1810; 2nd ed. in 1816.
- The Royal Exile; or, Victims of Human Passions: An Historical Romance of the Sixteenth Century. By Mrs. Green. In Four Volumes. London: John Joseph Stockdale, 1810; 2nd ed. 1811.
- Good Men of Modern Date. A Satirical Tale. In Three Volumes. By Mrs. Green. London: Thomas Tegg, 1811.
- Deception. A Fashionable Novel, in three volumes, founded on Facts. By Mrs. Green... London: Sherwood, Neely, and Jones, 1813.
- The Carthusian Friar; or, The Mysteries of Montanville. A Posthumous Romance. In Four Volumes. Corrected and Revised by An Author of Celebrity. London: Sherwood, Neely, and Jones; C. Chapple, 1814.
- The Fugitive; or, Family Incidents. In Three Volumes. By the author of Private History of the Court of England ... &c. London: Hannah Black, Parry, & Co., 1814; 2nd ed. 1815.
- Who is the Bridegroom? or, Nuptial Discoveries. A Novel. In Three Volumes. By Mrs. Green. London: A. K. Newman and Co., 1822.
- Gretna Green Marriages; or, The Nieces. A Novel. In Three Volumes. By Mrs. Green. London: A. K. Newman and Co., 1823.
- Scotch Novel Reading; or, Modern Quackery. A Novel Really Founded on Facts. In three volumes. By a Cockney. London: A. K. Newman and Co., 1824.
- Parents and Wives; or, Inconsistency and Mistakes. A Novel. In three volumes. By Mrs. Green. London: A. K. Newman and Co., 1825.

=== Conduct literature ===
- [Anonymous]. Mental improvement for a young lady, on her entrance into the world; addressed to a favourite niece. London: printed at the Minerva Press, for William Lane, Leadenhall-Street; and sold by Mrs. Harlow, Pall-Mall, 1793; 2nd ed. 1794; 3rd ed. 1796.

=== Religious ===
- A letter to the publisher of Brothers's prophecies, by Mrs. S. Green: in which she bears testimony to the sanity of Mr. Brothers. And relates several visions, which she has had in confirmation of his mission. London: George Riebau, 1795.

=== Translation ===
- Raphael; or, Peaceful Life. In Two Volumes. Translated from the German of Augustus [Heinrich Julius] Lafontaine. By Mrs. Green. . London: James Taylor and Co., 1812.

=== Editing ===
- Fatherless fanny; or a young lady's first entrance into life. By the late Miss Taylor. Edited and enlarged by Mrs. Sarah Green. London: Fisher, Son & Co., 1811. Later editions in 1822, 1833, 1835.

== Etexts ==
- Court intrigue (1799) (Etext, British Library)
- The Private History of the Court of England (1808) (HathiTrust Vol. I, II) (Etext, British Library)
- Tales of the Manor (1809) (Google Books, Vol. I, II)
- The Festival of St Jago (1810) (Etext, Google Books)
- Romance Readers and Romance Writers (1810) (Chawton House has a PDF)
- The Royal Exile (1811) (HathiTrust Vol. I, II, III, IV)
- Fatherless Fanny (1822) (Etext, British Library) (Etext, Google Books)
- Who is the Bridegroom? (1822) (HathiTrust Vol. I, II, III) (Etext, British Library)
- Parents and Wives (1825) (Etext, British Library)

== Sources ==
- Paul Baines, ‘Green, Sarah (fl. 1790–1825)’, Oxford Dictionary of National Biography, Oxford University Press, 2004. Accessed 13 Nov 2006.
- Blain, Virginia, et al., eds. "Sarah Green." The Feminist Companion to Literature in English. New Haven and London: Yale UP, 1990, pp. 457—458. (Open access, Internet Archive)
- Brown, Susan, et al. "Sarah Green." Orlando: Women’s Writing in the British Isles from the Beginnings to the Present. Ed. Susan Brown, Patricia Clements, and Isobel Grundy. Cambridge University Press. Cambridge UP, n.d. 22 Mar. 2013. Accessed 19 Sept. 2022.
- Todd, Janet. "Sarah Green." A Dictionary of British and American women writers, 1660-1800. Totowa, N.J.: Rowman & Allanheld, 1985, pp. 139. - via Internet Archive
- "Green, Sarah." The Women's Print History Project, 2019, Person ID 449. Accessed 2022-09-19.
