= Royal Toxophilite Society =

Archery club in England

- Royal Toxophilite Society
- Formation: 3 April 1781; 245 years ago
- Formerly called: Toxophilite Society

The Royal Toxophilite Society is the oldest archery club in England.

== History ==
Thomas Waring, an associate of Ashton Lever, had started partaking in archery in an effort to get more exercise and improve his health. Lever, apparently after seeing the effect archery had on Waring, founded what was then known as the Toxophilite Society on 3 April 1781. In 1787, George Augustus Frederick, the Prince of Wales and the future King of the United Kingdom, started occasionally shooting with the society. Its name was changed to the Royal Toxophilite Society in 1847.

In 1919, women were first allowed to become associate members of the society. They were granted full membership in 1939. Previously, the Society had had two Lady Patronesses: Lady Jane James (daughter of Charles Pratt, 1st Earl Camden) in 1789 and Mary Champion de Crespigny in 1901. Lady Jane James instituted a prize for the Lady Patroness's Target.

Membership is by invitation only.
