= John Fenwick (radical) =

John Fenwick (baptised 1757 – 1823) was an English army officer, political radical and Irish nationalist writer. He was a close friend of William Godwin, a loyal associate of James Coigly, and the husband of Eliza Fenwick.

== Life ==
In mid-1801 Fenwick bought from Daniel Lovell a newspaper, the Albion and Evening Advertiser. He ran it with Charles Lamb, but publication ceased in August of that year. He had known Lamb through Godwin, from the previous year.

== Works ==
- Memoirs of General Dumourier (1794), translator

Fenwick wrote for Richard Phillips a biographical sketch of William Godwin, for Public Characters of 1799–1800, from personal acquaintance, and asserting Godwin's personal fame of the period.
