= Benedikte Naubert =

German writer

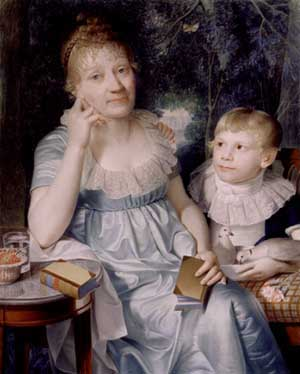
Benedikte Naubert with foster son, 1806

Benedikte Naubert (born Christiana Benedicta Hebenstreit; 13 September 1756 – 12 January 1819) was a German writer who anonymously published more than 50 historical novels and is considered a pioneer of the genre in the 1780s. Naubert wrote under the pseudonyms Verfasser des Walther von Montbarry, Verfasser der Alme, Verfasserin des Walther von Montbarry, and Fontanges. Today she is largely unknown, even in Germany.

== Biography ==
She was born in Leipzig, the daughter of professor of medicine, Johann Ernst Hebenstreit, who died in December 1757. From her step-brother, a professor of theology, Naubert received a thorough education in philosophy, history, Latin, and Greek. She also learned to play the piano and harp and taught herself Italian, English, and French. She began writing and published her first book in her mid-twenties, Heerfort und Klärchen, published anonymously. From there she wrote a novel per year and often more. Several men were suspected to have written Naubert's works. In 1797, at age 41, she married Lorenz Holderieder, a merchant and estate owner in Naumberg, who died in 1800. Naubert then married Johann Georg Naubert. As she aged Naubert's eyes and ears became weak, causing Naubert to write her last publications through dictation. Against her will, in 1817 her identity was revealed in an article in the Zeitung für die elegante Welt. Her next book, Rosalba (1817), bore her true name for the first time. She died in 1819 in Leipzig, where she had traveled for an eye operation.

== Literary-historical significance ==
Naubert chose anonymity while publishing her works. Using only pseudonyms, Naubert received high praise for her publications. The Allgemeiner Litterarischer Anzeiger wrote on Naubert's anonymity, saying "the writings of this anonym... belong without a doubt to the better products of our literature". The public believed she was male because of her in-depth knowledge of philosophy, history, and classical languages. Körner wrote to Schiller about the anonymous writer saying, "all these works appear to be from a man, and not a mediocre one." However, after K. J. Schütz revealed her true identity, the reviews changed. Her works without the veil of anonymity found criticism with many reviewers who claimed she wrote in imitation "of men she was like or presumably emulated." A monograph by Hilary Brown on Naubert's study of and influence on English literature was published in 2005.

== Published works ==
Benedikte Naubert's published works as cited by An Encyclopedia of Continental Women Writers.

=== Novels ===
- Heerfort und Klärchen; etwas für empfindsame Seelen [Heerfort and Clara, Something for Sentimental Souls], 2 vols., 1779
- Geschichte Emmas, Tochter Karls des Groen, und seines Geheimschreibers Eginhard [The Story of Emma, Daughter of Charlemagne, and His Scribe Eginhard], 2 vols., 1785
- Die Ruinen [The Ruins], 3 vols., 1786
- Amalgunde, Königin von Italien; oder Das Märchen von der Wunderquelle. Eine Sage aus den Zeiten Theodorichs des Groen [Amalgunde, Queen of Italy; or the Fairytale of the Miraculous Well. A Tale from the Time of Theoderich the Great], vols., 1786
- Walther von Montbarry, Gromeister der Tempelordens [Walter de Monbary, Grand Master of the Knights Templars], 2 vols., 1786; English tr. 1803
- Die Amtmännin von Hohenweiler: eine wirkliche Geschichte aus Familienpapieren gezogen [The Magistrate's Wife at Hohenweiler, a True Story Drawn from Family Papers], 1787
- Geschichte der Gräfin Thekla von Thurn; oder Scenen aus dem drayssigjährigen Kriege [The Story of Countess Thekla von Thurn, or Scenes from the Thirty Years' War], 1788
- Hermann von Unna; eine Geschichte aus den Zeiten der Vehmgerichte [Hermann of Unna, a Series of Adventures of the Fifteenth Century, in Which the Proceedings of the Secret Tribunal...are delineated...], 1788; English tr. 1794
- Konradin von Schwaben oder Geschichte des unglücklichen Enkels Kaiser Friedrichs des Zweiten [Conradin of Swabia, or the Story of the Unhappy Grandson of Emperor Friedrich II], 1788
- Elfriede, oder Opfer väterlicher Vorurtheile [Elfriede, or the Victim of a Father's Prejudices], 1788
- Pauline Frankini oder Täuschung der Leidenschaft und Freuden der Liebe [Pauline Frankini or Delusion of Passion and Joys of Love], 1788
- Elisabeth, Erbin von Toggenburg: oder Geschichte der Frauen von Sargans in der Schweiz [Elisabeth, Heiress of Toggenburg, or the Story of the Women of Sargans in Switzerland], 1789
- Emmy Reinolds; oder Thorheiten der Groen und Kleinen [Emmy Reinolds, or Follies of Great and Small], 1789
- Hatto, Bischof von Mainz: eine Legende des zehnten Jahrhunderts [Hatto, Bishop of Mainz, a Legend of the Tenth Century], 1789
- Alfons von Dülmen; oder Geschichte Kaiser Philipps und seiner Tochter. Aus den ersten Zeiten der heimlichen Gerichte [Alf von Duelmen, or the History of the Emperor Philip, and His Daughters], 1790; English tr. 1794
- Barbara Blomberg, Vorgebliche Maitresse Kaiser Karls des fünften. Eine Originalgeschichte in zwei Theilen [Barbara Blomberg, Alleged Mistress of Emperor Charles IV, an Original Story in Two Parts], 1790
- Brunilde, Eine Anekdote aus dem bürgerlichen Leben des dreizehnten Jahrhunderts [Brunilde, an Anecdote from Bourgeois Life of the 13th Century], 1790
- Geschichte des Lord Fitzherbert und seiner Freunde, oder die verkannte Liebe [Story of Lord Fitzherbert and His Friends, or Misunderstood Love], 1790
- Merkwürdige Begebenheiten der gräflichen Familie von Wallis [Remarkable Events of the Family of the Count of Wallis], 1790
- Graf Adolf IV. aus Schauenburgischem Stamme [Count Adolf IV of the Clan of Schauenburg], 1791
- Geschichte Heinrich Courtlands; oder, Selbstgeschafne Leiden [History of Heinrich Courtland, or Selfmade Sorrows], 1791
- Edwy und Elgiva, oder die Wunder des heiligen Dunstan, eine altenglische geschichte [Edwy and Elgiva, or the Miracle of Saint Dunstan, and Old English Story], 1791
- Gebhard Truchse von Waldburg, Churfürst von Cöln, oder die astrologischen Fürsten [Gebhard Lord High Steward of Waldburg, Elector of Cologne, or the Astrological Princes], 1791
- Graf von Rosenberg, oder das enthüllte Verbrechen. Eine Geschichte aus der letzten Zeit des dreyssigjährigen Kriegs [Count von Rosenberg, or the Discovered Crime, a Story from the Time of the Thirty Years' War], 1791
- Lord Heinrich Holland, Herzog von Exeter; oder Irre geleitete Gromuth eine Begebenheit aus dem Mittelalter von England [Lord Henry Holland, Duke of Exeter, or Magnanimity Mislead, an Event from the English Middle Ages], 1791
- Marie Fürst, oder das Alpenmädchen [Marie Fürst, or the Alps Girl], 1791
- Philippe von Geldern; oder Geschichte Selims, des Sohns Amurat [Phillipe von Geldern, or the Story of Selim, Son of Amurat], 1792
- Konrad und Siegfried von Fehtwangen, Gromeister des deutschen Ordens [Conrad and Siegfriend von Fehtwangen, Grand Masters of the German Knights], 1792
- Miss Luise Fox, oder Reise einer jungen Englanderin durch einige Gegenden von Deutschland [Miss Luise Fox, or Travels of a Young Englishwomen Through Some parts of Germany], 1792
- Ulrich Holzer, Bürgermeister in Wien [Ulrich Holzer, Mayor of Vienna], 1792
- Lucinde; oder, Herrn Simon Godwins medicinische Leiden. Nach dem Englischen [Lucinde, or Mr. Simon Godwin's Medical Sufferings. From the English], 1793
- Heinrich von Plauen und seine Neffen, Ritter des deutschen Ordens. Der wahren Geschichte getreu bearbeitet [Heinrich von Plauen and His Nephews, Knights of the German Order, Faithfully Told According to the True Story], 1793
- Walther von Stadion; oder Geschichte Herzog Leopolds von Öesterreich und seiner Kriegsgefährten [Walter von Stadion, or the Story of Duke Leopold of Austria and His War Comrades], 1794
- Sitten und Launen der Groen, Ein Cabinet von Familienbildern [Manners and Moods of the Great, a Cabinet of Family Scenes], 1794
- Der Bund des armen Konrads, Getreue Schilderung einiger merkwürdiger Auftritte aus den Zeiten der Bauernkriege des 16. Jahrhunderts [Poor Conrad's Alliance, True description of Some Remarkable Scenes from the Time of the 16th-century Peasant Wars], 1795
- Friedrich der Siegreiche, Churfürst von der Pfalz; der Marc Aurel des Mittelalters. Frey nach der Geschichte bearbeitet [Friedrich the Victorious, Elector from the Pfalz, the Marcus Aurelius of the Middle Ages, Freely Told According to History], 1795
- Vellada; ein Zuberroman [Vellada, a Novel of Magic], 1795
- Joseph Mendez Pinto. Eine jüdische Geschichte [Joseph Mendez Pinto, a Jewish Story], 1802
- Cornelie, oder die Geheimnisse des Grabes [Cornelie or the Secrets of the Grave], 1803
- Eudoxia, Gemahlin Theodosius der Zweiten. Eine Geschichte des 5. Jahrhunderts [Eudoxia, Wife of Theodosius the Second, a Story from the Fifth Century], 1805
- Fontanges, oder das Schicksal der mutter und Tochter, eine Geschichte aus den Zeiten Ludwigs XIV [Fontanges, or the Fate of a mother and Daughter, a Story from the Times of Lous XIV], 1805
- Die Gräfin von Frondsberg, aus dem Hause Löwenstein, eine vaterländische Geschichte aus den Zeiten des Mittelalters [The Countess of Frondsberg, from the House of Löwenstein, a National Story from the Middle Ages], 1806
- Heitere Träume in kleinen Erzählungen [Cheerful Dreams in Little Stories], 1806
- Lioba und Zilia, 1806
- Wanderungen der Phantasie in die Gebiete des Wahren [Fantasy's Wanderings in the Territories of the True], 1806
- Attilas Schwert oder die Azimunterinnen [Attila's Sword, or the Azimunter Women], 1808
- Elisabeth Lezkau oder die Bürgermeisterin [Elisabeth Lezkau or the Mayor's Wife], 1808
- Alexis und Luise. Eine Badegeschichte [Alexis and Luise, a Story at Bath], 1810
- Azaria. Eine Dichtung der Vorwelt [Azaria, a Story of the Past], 1814
- Rosalba, 1817
- Turmalin und Lazerta, 1820 (posthumous)

=== Short story collections ===
- Neue Volksmärchen der Deutschen [New Fairy Tales of the Germans], 1789–92
- Alma; oder Ägyptische Mährchen [Alma, or Egyptian Fairytales], 1793–97
- Der kurze Mantel, und Ottilie; zwei Volksmärchen [The Short Cloak, and Ottilia, Two Fairytales], 1819 (posthumous)

=== English translations ===
- Translations of Heerfort und Klärchen:
  - Heerfort and Clara (1789) by John Poulin
- Translations of Alf von Dülmen:
  - Alf von Deulmen (1794) by A. E. Booth
- Translations of Hermann von Unna:
  - Herman of Unna (1794)
  - The Secret Tribunal (1795) a play by James Boaden
  - The Secret Tribunal; or, The Court of Winceslaus (1803)
- Translations of Lindorf und Caroline: (Note: No German original of Lindorf und Caroline has been discovered, though Montague Summers stated that it was published in 1792. A French translation Lindorf et Caroline was published in 1802.)
  - Lindorf and Caroline, or The Danger of Credulity (1803) by Mary Julia Young
- Translations of Walter von Montbarry, Großmeister des Temelordens:
  - Walter de Monbary, Grand Master of the Knights Templars (1803)
- Translations of Elisabeth, Erbin von Toggenburg:
  - Feudal Tyrants; or, The Counts of Carlsheim and Sargans (1806) by Matthew Gregory Lewis
- Translations from Neue Volksmährchen der Deutschen (1789–92):
  - "The Hoard of the Nibelungen" (1823) in Popular Tales and Romances of the Northern Nations
  - "The Erl-King's Daughter" (1823) in Popular Tales and Romances of the Northern Nations
  - "The Mantle" (1826) by George Soane
  - "The Cloak" (1990) by George Soane/Jeannine Blackwell
- Translations of Velleda:
  - "Boadicea and Velleda" (2001) by Jeannine Blackwell
