= Emily Clark (novelist) =

English novelist and poet

Emily Frederick Clark (fl. 1798–1833) was an English novelist and poet. Several of her novels are set in Wales.

== Family ==
She was the daughter of a customs official named Clark (died 1824) and his wife Elizabeth (died 1825), who was the daughter of Felice Frederick (c. 1725–1797). On the title pages of her novels she made unsubstantiated claims to be the great-granddaughter of Theodore, King of Corsica.

== Finances ==
Several of Clark's novels are set in the Welsh countryside. Press attention to her work dwindled, leaving her to wage a lifelong battle against penury. Twenty-four of her 42 applications to the Royal Literary Fund were successful. Nothing further is known of her after the last application was sent in 1833.

She is one of the "lost" women writers listed by Dale Spender in Mothers of the Novel: 100 Good Women Writers Before Jane Austen.

== Works ==
- Ianthé, or the Flower of Caernarvon (1798)
- Ermina Montrose or The Cottage of the Vale (1800)
- The Banks of the Douro, or, The Maid of Portugal (1805)
- Poems (1810)
- Tales at the Fireside (1817)
- The Esquimaux (1819)
