= Sarah Scudgell Wilkinson =

English children's writer and novelist (1779–1831)

- Born: Sarah Carr Wilkinson; 14 December 1779
- Died: 19 March 1831 (aged 51)
- Known for: Writing
- Spouse: Scadgell
- Children: Amelia
- Parent(s): Hannah and William

Sarah Scudgell Wilkinson (14 December 1779 – 19 March 1831) was an English writer of children's books and novels. Some of her many chapbooks adapted existing novels.

== Early life ==
Wilkinson was born 14 December 1779 and baptised as Sarah Carr Wilkinson. Her parents were Hannah and William. She was born into and remained in the middle class throughout her life, often on the edge of poverty. In 1788, John Marshall published Midsummer Holydays; or, A Long Story, which is credited to Wilkinson, a claim substantiated in the publication Visits to the Parsonage; or, the Juvenile Assembly. She had wanted to work with literature since girlhood. Wilkinson made early connections through reading to Lady Charlotte Finch, who was blind.

== Adult life ==
Wilkinson lived in London for much of her life. In 1806 she was living in Soho, in 1807 in Westminster, and in 1818 near Maidenhead in Berkshire. She is said to have had a husband named Scadgell, described as "nebulous", who died in 1818, and a daughter Amelia, born about 1807.

For some years she earned an income from a circulating library, acquired with financial and networking assistance from Lady Charlotte Finch, but this failed after 1811. She took in boarders, taught at Whitechapel Free School in Gower's Walk in eastern London, later served as a schoolmistress at Bray in Berkshire and started a day-school herself.

illustration of Whitechapel Free School on Gowers Walk

In 1818, she gained financial support from the Royal Literary Fund, in amounts varying between two and five pounds. In 1820, while struggling to support herself with a parlour shop as well as selling tape and picture books for children, she was diagnosed with breast cancer. In 1821, she resumed writing and editing. She nearly ended up in debtors' prison due to breaking a window. She again petitioned the Royal Literary Fund for aid, citing the difficulty of earning income as a female; furthermore, her publishers backed her petitions by attesting to her hard work and the sufferings of the publishing industry. Sarah Wilkinson's daughter Amelia obtained work in a lady's household. In 1824, the Royal Literary Fund provided five pounds towards her medical care; as a result, she underwent two surgical operations in St. George's Hospital.

Sarah Wilkinson died in St Margaret's Workhouse, Westminster, on 19 March 1831.

== Writing career ==
Wilkinson wrote about 50 chapbooks, a third of them were adaptations of existing romances, a few original novels, including The Thatched Cottage; and a school textbook and various other works for children. She also wrote for periodicals and created songs and remarks for Valentine's Day. Between 1800 and 1820, Wilkinson created about 103 works, but some, such as "Historical Reveries by a Suffolk Villager" were published after she died. The Tragical History of Miss Jane Arnold, Commonly called Crazy Jane (1818) was reprinted many times and is described as "an ostensibly moral tale of seduction, madness, and suicide... very popular on the northern provincial circuit". Her various publishers included Tabart, Richard Phillips and W. Darton. Often Sarah Wilkinson signed her books "S.W." She also published in Ladies Monthly Museum. Many of her works were abridgments of novels by authors such as Henry Fielding, Matthew Lewis, Walter Scott, Ann Radcliffe, Amelia Opie and James Porter. Her dedications included The Fugitive Countess to Mary Champion de Crespigny.

In gothic fiction, she was described as "one of the most productive and gifted of female fiend-mongers". Her literary style combined a more gothic style with mainstream writing. Her Valentine's verses gave women more social liberty in reaching out to men whom they loved. Her work often satirized that of Ann Radcliffe, and included ghostly figures. Her female characters often found themselves socially isolated.

== Notable works ==
- The tragical history of Crazy Jane, and Young Henry: giving an account of their birth, parentage, courtship, and melancholy end: founded on facts, (1800)
- Monkcliffe Abbey, or, The history of Albert, Elwina, and Adeline, 1807
- The Maid of Lochlin, or, Northern mysteries: a Scottish romance, 1804
- Convent of Grey Penitents : or, the Apostate Nun. A romance, 1810
- The Fugitive Countess; or, Convent of St. Ursula. A Romance, 1807
- New Tales, 1819
- Historical reveries by a Suffolk villager (1839) (Though WorldCat lists Wilkinson as the author, the British Library attributes Elizabeth Susan Cowell)
- The History of Crazy Jane, 1813
- The Eventful History of Charles Brandon, Duke of Suffolk, the flower of English chivalry, and the Princess Mary of England; an original romance, founded on historical facts, 1820
- The pathetic and interesting history of George Barnwell, the London 'prentice: founded on facts, 1804
- A visit to a farm-house, or, An introduction to various subjects connected with rural economy, 1804
- Therese; or, The orphan of Geneva: an interesting romance, 1821
- A Visit to London: containing a description of the principal curiosities in the British metropolis, 1810
- Priory of St. Clair: or, Spectre of the murdered nun, a gothic tale, 1811
- The Pirate, or, The Sisters of Burgh Westra: a tale of the islands of Shetland and Orkney; epitomized from the celebrated novel of the same title written by the author of Waverly, 1822
- Ivy Castle, or, The eve of St. Agnes: being an interesting history of the Wilmington family, including memoirs of Lord Colville and Agnes St. Eustace: founded on facts, 1822
- The abbott, 1820s
- Hodgson's universal valentine writer, for the current year: being a choice collection of original amatory epistles, addresses, answers, &c. &c.: adapted to the use of persons of either sex; and suited to all ranks and conditions of lovers, and would-be lovers, 1822
- The subterraneous passage; or, Gothic cell: a romance, 1803
- Albert of Werdendorff; or, The midnight embrace: A romance, from the German'', 1800

The list of works is sourced from WorldCat Identities.
