= Pandora Press =

Publishing imprint for feminist books

- Parent company: Routledge and Kegan Paul; HarperCollins Publishers;
- Founded: 1983; 43 years ago
- Founder: Philippa Brewster
- Country of origin: United Kingdom
- Publication types: Books

Pandora Press is a UK feminist publishing imprint that was founded in 1983 by Philippa Brewster at Routledge and Kegan Paul, with Dale Spender as editor-at-large. It was the first imprint to produce a list devoted primarily to feminist non-fiction.

== History, key titles and authors ==
Among early Pandora Press titles were Spender's There's Always Been a Women's Movement This Century (1983) and Time and Tide Wait for No Man (1984), and other authors published by the imprint included Marge Piercy (Stone, Paper, Knife, 1983) and Jeanette Winterson (Oranges Are Not the Only Fruit, 1985, winner of the Whitbread Award for a first novel). Brewster took on a book written by the women of Greenham Common, about which she has said: "That seemed to fulfill what we really wanted to do. ...We were all part of the women's movement. We represented it, but we also informed it." Also a commissioning editor for Pandora Press was Candida Lacey, who went on to become publisher of Myriad Editions for 15 years.

Pandora Press was committed to addressing women's contribution to literary history and to showing, according to The New York Times, that "women were the mothers of the novel and that any other version of its origin is but a myth of male creation", as demonstrated in Spender's 1986 work Mothers of the Novel: 100 Good Women Writers Before Jane Austen. As well as exploring the output of female writers of the 17th, 18th and early 19th centuries, whose work had been overlooked by male historians and literary critics, Spender produced an accompanying series for Pandora Press that featured such writers as Maria Edgeworth, Charlotte Lennox, Mary Hays and Mary Brunton.

The imprint published titles by such notable contemporary writers as Michelene Wandor (ed. On Gender and Writing, 1983, with contributors including Sara Maitland, Judith Kazantzis, Wendy Mulford, Libby Houston, Michèle Roberts, Angela Carter, Noel Greig, Rozsika Parker, Alison Hennegan, Jill Tweedie, Angela Phillips, Mary Stott, Penelope Shuttle, Peter Redgrove, Pam Gems, Eva Figes, Margaret Drabble and Fay Weldon), and Cynthia Enloe (Bananas, Beaches and Bases: Making Feminist Sense of International Politics, 1989), among others.

As reported by Simone Murray in Mixed Media: Feminist Presses and Publishing Politics (Pluto Press, 2004), Pandora Press became part of HarperCollins Publishers for a while, before being "sold in January 1998 to the small-scale North London independent, Rivers Oram Press."
