= E. M. Foster =

English female novelist (fl. late 18th – early 19th c.)

E. M. Foster (fl. late 18th – early 19th c.) was a Romantic-era novelist. Fourteen of her popular novels were published in London between 1795 and 1810.

== Novels ==
The Duke of Clarence. An historical novel (1795, signed E. M. F.) takes place in the 15th century, presented in what a modern critic has called "an incongruous style". The plot involves an illegitimate boy who is advised to reclaim his unhappy mother, but who finds it hard to lay down his arms after the Battle of Bosworth Field, which ended the Wars of the Roses.

Foster's writing gained confidence as she turned to more modern subject-matter in Frederic and Caroline, or the Fitzmorris Family (1800, E. M. F.), which she dedicated to the Princess Charlotte Augusta of Wales. It was one of four novels of hers to appear in that year, and includes a scene set in the Minerva Circulating Library, which was associated with the Minerva Press, responsible for most of her books. Light and Shade: a novel. By the author of 'Federetta' (a pseudonym of Mrs E. M. Foster), was published in 1803 in Bath and London and described as being by the author of "Rebecca, Judith, Miriam, etc."

== Views ==
Foster's conservative social views appear particularly in The Corinna of England, and a Heroine in the Shade (1809), in which retribution is wreaked on a shallowly portrayed version of the French author Germaine de Staël's heroine of that name. This work has also been ascribed to another novelist active at the time, Mrs. E. G. Bayfield, perhaps through a confusion at the publisher's.

Foster's work largely endorses mainstream Christian morals, often taking an ironic approach through a narrator, who identifies as a woman with a proto-feminist outlook.

== Life ==
E. M. Foster's personal details and life remain "obscure". She is one of the "lost" women writers listed by Dale Spender in Mothers of the Novel: 100 Good Women Writers Before Jane Austen.

== See also ==
- List of English novelists
- List of women writers
