= Man Made Language =

1980 book by Dale Spender

- Title page for Man Made Language (1980)
- Author: Dale Spender
- Language: English
- Publisher: Routledge & Kegan Paul
- Publication date: 1980
- ISBN: 9780710006752

Man Made Language is a 1980 book by Australian feminist writer Dale Spender. In it she examines numerous areas of sexism as it appears in nature and in the use of the English language, with particular focus on the way men and women talk and listen differently in couples and in mixed or single-sex groups; how men have historically constructed the language; how the word man is used to refer to both men and the species; how God is always seen as male; and how intercourse is described as "penetrative" sex when penetration is something that only the man does. On the last point, Spender suggests the use of "engulfing/surrounding" sex as an alternative description of coitus from the woman's point of view.

The book was first published in London by Routledge & Kegan Paul.
