= Martha Harley =

British Gothic novelist

- Occupation: novelist
- Writing career
- Pen name: "a young lady"; "by the author of"; "Mrs. Harley"; "Mrs. Hugill"
- Language: English
- Years active: 1786—1798
- Period: Romantic era
- Subject: Gothic

Martha Harley (later Hugill; fl. 1786—1798) was the successful author of six Gothic novels.

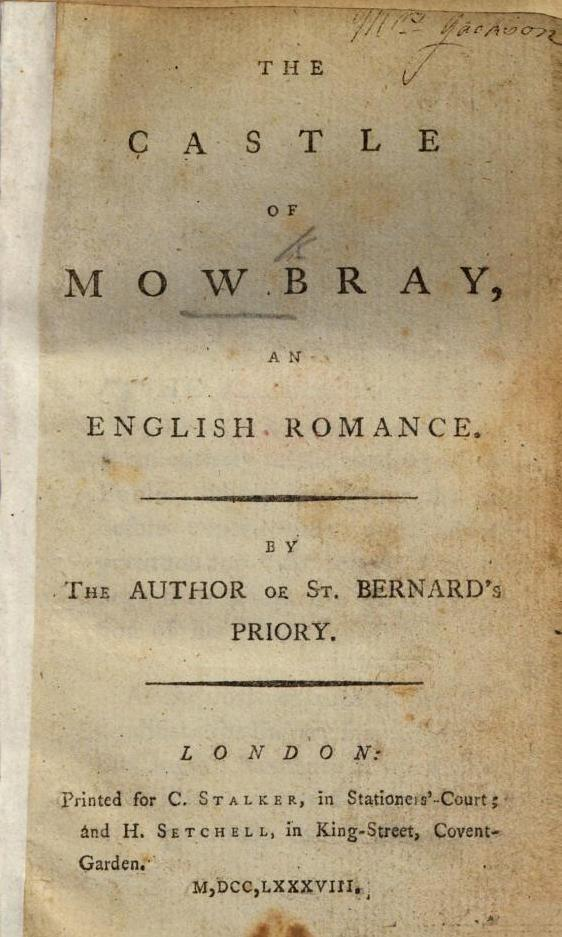
Title page of Martha Harley's The castle of Mowbray, an English romance. London: C. Stalker, and H. Setchell, 1788.

== Life ==
Little is known of Harley's life other than that she published half a dozen popular novels and lived at least part of her life in London. Judging by her publishing history, she was born "Harley" and changed her name to "Hugill" at some point between 1794 and 1797, presumably through marriage.

== Work ==
Harley's first novel, St. Bernard's priory (1786), was printed privately, published anonymously, and sold by subscription. Her five subsequent novels were all handled by professional publishers and garnered her a degree of commercial success. Her second and third novels were also published anonymously, "by the author of &". Her fourth and fifth novels, Juliana Ormeston and The prince of Leon, were published under the name "Mrs. Harley," and her final novel, Isidora of Gallicia, as "Mrs. Hugill." Isidora of Gallicia was translated into French, and two of her novels were published by the highly successful purveyor of popular fiction and founder of the Minerva Press, William Lane.

The early novels were reviewed favourably, though there would seem to have been a decrease in critical enthusiasm by the end of her career.

Harley was one of the 106 "lost" women writers Dale Spender listed in Mothers of the Novel in 1986.

== Works ==
- St. Bernard's priory. An old English tale; being the first literary production of a young lady. London: printed for the authoress, and sold at [William T.] Swift's Circulating Library, Charles-Street, St. James's Square, 1786. 2nd. ed. London: William Lane, 1789.
- The castle of Mowbray, an English romance. By the author of St. Bernard's priory. London: C. Stalker, and H. Setchell, 1788. Irish ed. 1789.
- The countess of Hennebon, an historical novel, in three volumes. By the author of the Priory of St. Bernard. London: William Lane, 1789.
- Juliana Ormeston: or, the fraternal victim. By Mrs. Harley, author of the Prince of Leon, St. Bernard's Priory, &c. &c. London: James Barker, 1793; Irish ed. 1793.
- The prince of Leon. A Spanish romance. In two volumes. By Mrs. Harley. Author of Juliana ormeston, &c. London: James Barker, 1794.
- Isidora of Gallicia: a novel. In two volumes. By Mrs. Hugill, author of Countess of Hennibon, Julia Ormeston, The Prince of Leon, &c. &c. London: Lee and Hurst, 1797.

== See also ==
- List of Minerva Press authors
- Mothers of the Novel: 100 Good Women Writers Before Jane Austen

== Etexts ==
- St. Bernard's priory (1786) (Open access, Internet Archive) (Etext, Google Books)
- The castle of Mowbray (1788) (Etext, Google Books)
