= Ann Gomersall =

British novelist (1750–1835)

- Born: Ann Richardson; 24 January 1750; Portsmouth, England
- Died: 17 June 1835 (aged 85); Newport, Isle of Wight
- Writing career
- Pen name: "A Female Inhabitant of Leeds in Yorkshire"
- Language: English
- Literary movement: Romantic; Gothic

Ann Gomersall (24 January 1750 – 17 June 1835) was a British novelist of the Romantic-era who paid close attention to economic and social issues in her writing.

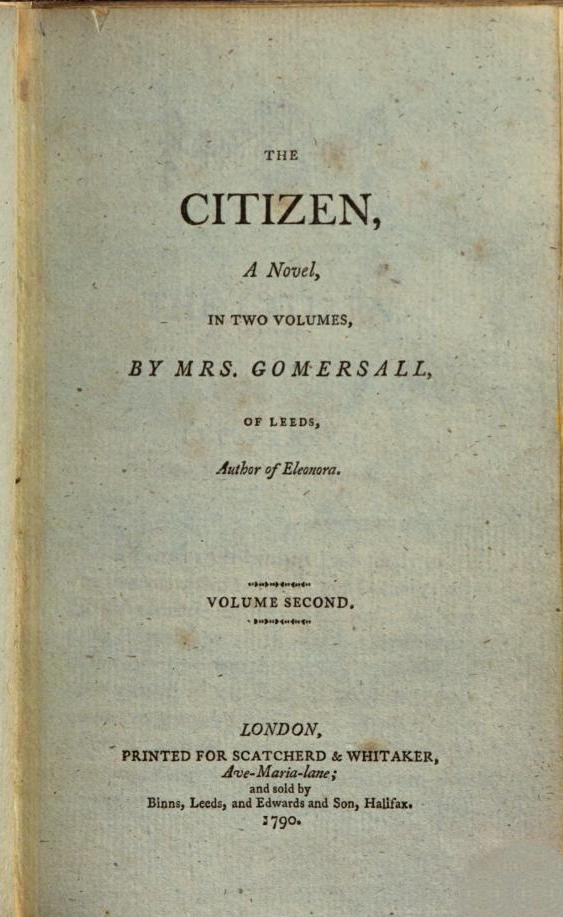
Title page, Ann Gomersall, The citizen, a novel. In two volumes. London: Scatcherd & Whitaker, 1790.

== Life ==
Ann Richardson was probably born in Portsmouth, Hampshire where her parents lived. According to the signatures on all three of her novels, she lived for many years in Leeds. Little else is known of her early life. She began writing in order to raise money for her husband, a merchant, after he had suffered a financial setback. She was widowed after thirty-five years of marriage and worked for eight years at manual labour. From 1818, she began to apply for relief from the Royal Literary Fund. After a stroke and with failing vision, she turned again to writing from economic necessity, and published Creation, A Poem by subscription in 1824. All five hundred copies were sold. A decade later, she died as a parish pauper.

== Writing ==
Although Eleonora, Gomersall's first novel, was published anonymously, she was known to be the author. The novel was reviewed favourably by The Critical Review, Town and Country, and the Universal Magazine of Knowledge and Pleasure, although the latter did not approve of her reproduction of the "coarse and ungrammatical dialect" of her characters. The Monthly Review, on the other hand, which also reviewed it, remarked on Gomersall's "happy facility in sketching familiar conversations."

Gomersall's novels are of "an unusually bourgeois tendency" and display a "pro-mercantile attitude." Like many writers of her time, she wrote about women's economic precarity. She also paid particular attention to issues of social and economic class, and The disappointed heir (1796) describes fighting in America and contains episodes set in the West Indies.

Bibliographer James Raven admires Gomersall's novels, though he notes a degree of "haste or inattention" to detail in some of her published works.

From her second novel onward, she published under her own name. Her works were praised during her lifetime as "artless" and "pleasing" but were "quickly forgotten." More recently, however, she has garnered new attention: she was one of the one hundred and six "lost" women writers Dale Spender listed in Mothers of the Novel: 100 Good Women Writers Before Jane Austen, and Routledge published the first critical edition of one of her novels in 2016 with The Citizen (1790).

== Works ==
=== Novels ===
- Eleonora, a novel, in a series of letters; written by a female inhabitant of Leeds in Yorkshire. London: printed for the Authoress, by the Literary Society at the Logographic Press, and sold by J. Walter, No. 169, Piccadilly, and W. Richardson, 1789. (by subscription)
- The citizen, a novel. In two volumes, by Mrs. Gomersall of Leeds, author of Eleonora. London: Scatcherd & Whitaker, 1790. (by subscription)
- The disappointed heir: or, memoirs of the Ormond family. A novel. In two volumes. By A. Gomersall, author of Eleonora, Citizen, &c. Exeter: J. M'Kenzie; W. Richardson; Hookham and Carpenter, 1796.

=== Poetry ===
- Creation, A Poem: by A. Gomersall. Newport: Printed for the author; and sold by Black, Young, and Young, London; and by J. Rowden, Newport, Isle of Wight, 1824. (by subscription)

== Etexts ==
- The Citizen, 1790. (Google Books, Vol. I, II)
- Creation, A Poem, 1824. (Etext, Google Books)

== See also ==
- Mothers of the Novel: 100 Good Women Writers Before Jane Austen

== Notes and references ==
=== References ===
- Blain, Virginia, et al., eds. The Feminist Companion to Literature in English. New Haven and London: Yale UP, 1990. (Open access, Internet Archive)
- Brown, Susan, et al. "Ann Gomersall." Orlando: Women’s Writing in the British Isles from the Beginnings to the Present. Cambridge University Press. Cambridge UP, n.d. 22 March 2013. Accessed 25 September 2022.
- Copeland, Edward. Women Writing About Money: Women's Fiction in England, 1790-1820. Cambridge University Press, 2004. ISBN 9780521616164 ISBN 0521616166
- Garside, Peter. "Subscribing Fiction in Britain, 1780—1829." The Corvey Library and Anglo-German Cultural Exchanges, 1770-1837: Essays to Honour Rainer Schöwerling. Editor: Rainer Schöwerling. Wilhelm Fink, 2004, pp. 55–100. ISBN 9783770539338 ISBN 3770539338
- Hawkins, Ann R. Romantic Women Writers Reviewed, Part I. Taylor & Francis, 2022. ISBN 9781000743753 ISBN 1000743756
- Raven, James. "The Anonymous Novel in Britain and Ireland, 1750—1830." Faces of Anonymity: Anonymous and Pseudonymous Publication, 1600-2000. Editor: R. Griffin. Palgrave Macmillan, 2016, pp. 141–166. ISBN 9781137111098 ISBN 1137111097
- Summers, Montague. A Gothic Bibliography, 1941. (Open access, Internet Archive)
- Todd, Janet. "Gomersall, Mrs. A. (fl. 1789—1824)" A Dictionary of British and American women writers, 1660-1800. Totowa, N.J.: Rowman & Allanheld, 1985. (Open access, Internet Archive)
- Turner, Cheryl. Living by the pen: women writers in the eighteenth century. Routledge, 1992.
- "Gomersall, Ann." The Women's Print History Project, 2019, Person ID 167. Accessed 2022-09-26.
- Yoon, Margaret S., editor. The Citizen. Ann Gomersall. Chawton House Library: Women's Novels. Routledge, 2015. ISBN 9781848931091
