= Mary Julia Young =

British author (fl. 1775–1810)

- Occupation: author
- Relatives: Edward Young
- Writing career
- Pen name: A lady; a young lady
- Language: English
- Years active: 1788—1810
- Period: Romantic
- Notable work: Memoirs of Mrs. Crouch (1806)

Mary Julia Young (fl. 1775–1810) was a prolific novelist, poet, translator, and biographer, active in the Romantic period, who published the bulk of her works with market-driven publishers James Fletcher Hughes and William Lane of the Minerva Press. She is of particular interest as an example of a professional woman writer in "a market of mass novel production."

== Life ==
Very little is known of Young's life or circumstances, despite her considerable literary output. It has been surmised from her publication history that she may have been in a precarious financial position. Some of her novels have been described as "potboilers," though she also wrote "an excellent theatrical biography" and other "intelligent and interesting work." She applied to the Royal Literary Fund for financial assistance in 1808. What little is known about her derives from this application: she was the last living representative of her family, and had a familial connection to well-known Augustan poet Edward Young (1683–1765).

== Writing ==
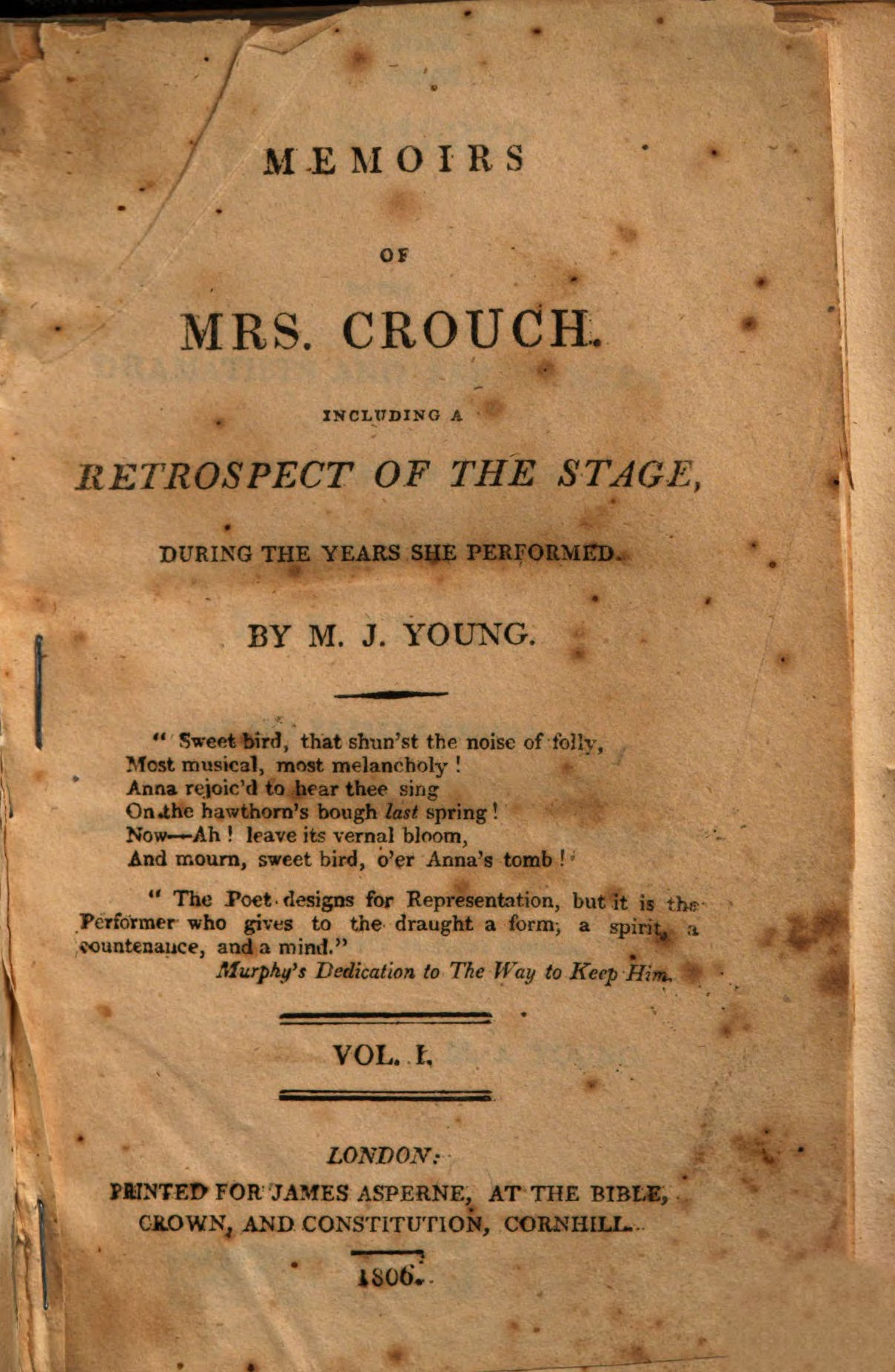
Title page of Mary Julia Young's Memoirs of Mrs. Crouch. Including a Retrospect of the Stage, during the Years she Performed. By M. J. Young. Vol. I. London: James Asperne, 1806. (HathiTrust)

Young initially wrote poetry but soon expanded into other genres. Her first collection of verse, Genius and Fancy, described as "a survey of the London stage," was published in 1791, went into a second edition in 1795, and then was immediately republished in an expanded edition with three times the number of pages as the original. That third edition is also significant in that it was published under Young's own name, rather than as "by a lady" as the first two editions were.

Young published three translations. She translated Lindorf and Caroline (1803), an historical novel attributed to the highly prolific yet stringently anonymous German author, Benedikte Naubert. (Note: No German original of Lindorf and Caroline by Naubert has been discovered, though a French version, Lindorf et Caroline, also attributed to Naubert, was published in 1802.) One of her other two translations was also of a work by a woman author: J. B. C. Berthier's The Mother and Daughter (1804). The third translation, of writings of François-Marie Arouet's (Voltaire), was published as Voltairiana.

Young published either eight or nine novels; The family party (London: Minerva Press, 1791) has generally been attributed to her but at least one critic has argued that this is probably a miss-attribution. Young's novels were written to sell: they were frequently sentimental, often Gothic, and sometimes sensational. Reviews were mixed. Practically all of her work was published under her own name, given the prestige of her connection to Edward Young, though she published A Summer at Brighton anonymously in 1807. It was evidently successful as it went into a second and third edition that same year, and fourth and fifth editions (the latter with an additional volume of material) in 1808. Her next novel, A Summer at Weymouth, was also published anonymously, likely because both were scandal novels. Her next and final novel, The Heir of Drumcondra, marked a return to the sentimental novel and was again published under her own name. It was not published by her longtime publisher James Fletcher Hughes, however, because he went bankrupt in 1808, but by Minerva press. It was at this point, at the end of a busy writing career, that Young was obliged to apply to the Royal Literary Fund.

Young had a longstanding interest in the theatre and in addition to her poetry, fiction, and translations, in 1806 she published a well-regarded biography of actress Anna Maria Crouch (1763—1805): Memoirs of Mrs. Crouch. Including a Retrospect of the Stage, during the Years she Performed.

While she was listed by Dale Spender in Mothers of the Novel in 1986 as one of the "lost" women writers of the period before Jane Austen, she has since received some critical attention. Her poetry was anthologized in 1997 and 2002, and there is a growing body of scholarly research.

== Works ==
=== Poetry ===
- Genius and fancy; or, dramatic sketches. By a lady. London: Henry Delahoy Symonds and John Gray, 1791. Rpt. 1795.
- Genius and fancy; or, Dramatic Sketches: with other poems on various subjects. By Mary Julia Young. The poem of Genius and fancy, or Dramatic Sketches, wrote in 1792, was designed for a separate publication, some hundred copies printed, and many presentation ones circulated; but upon consideration, being thought rather too trivial, to appear by itself, the authoress has added the subsequent poems; and flatters herself, the candour of an indulgent Public, will make allowance for the changes that have taken place in the Dramatic World since the above period, the chief of which are the Deaths of General Burgoyne, (author of the Maid of the Oaks, the Lord of the Manor, and the Heiress,) Mrs. Webb, Mr. Baddeley, &c. London: Henry Delahoy Symonds, John Gray, and W. Lee, 1795.
- Adelaide and Antonine: or the emigrants: a tale, by Mary Julia Young. London: J. Debrett; Booker; Keating; Lewis, and Robinsons, 1793.
- Poems. By Mary Julia Young, Author of Rose-Mount Castle. London: Minerva Press, 1798. [Reissued as The Metrical Museum Part I. Containing Agnes, or the Wanderer, a Story Founded on the French Revolution. The Flood, an Irish Tale. Adelaide and Antonine, or the Emigrants. With Other Original Poems. London: James Fisher, 1801.]

=== Novels ===
- Anonymous. The family party. In three volumes. London: Minerva Press, 1791. [possible miss-attribution]
- Rose-mount castle; or, false report. A novel. In three volumes. By M. J. Young. London: Minerva Press, 1798.
- The East Indian, or Clifford Priory. A novel, in four volumes. By Mary Julia Young, author of Rose-Mount Castle, Poems, &c. London: Earle and Hemet, 1799. [1st Irish edition: Dublin: N. Kelly, and D. Graisberry, 1800.
- Moss Cliff Abbey; or, The Sepulchral Harmonist. A Mysterious Tale. In Four Vols. By Mary-Julia Young, Author of Rose Mount Castle; The East Indian; The Kinsmen of Naples; Poems, &c. London: B. Crosby and Co.; J. F. Hughes, 1803.
- Right and Wrong; or, The Kinsmen of Naples. A Romantic Story, in Four Volumes. By Mary Julia Young, Author of Rose Mount Castle, The East Indian, Moss Cliff Abbey, Poems, &c. &c. London: B. Crosby and Co.; J. F. Hughes, 1803.
- Donalda, or The Witches of Glenshiel. A Caledonian Legend, in Two Volumes. By Mary Julia Young, Author of Moss Cliff Abbey; Right and Wrong; The East Indian; Rose Mount Castle, &c.London: J. F. Hughes, 1805.
- Anonymous. A Summer at Brighton. A Modern Novel, in Three Volumes. London: J. F. Hughes, 1807. (2nd & 3rd eds 1807; 4th & 5th 1808).
- Anonymous. A Summer at Brighton. A Modern Novel, in Four volumes. The fourth volume contains The Story of the Modern Laïs. Fifth Edition. London: J. F. Hughes, 1808.
- A Summer at Weymouth, or, The Star of Fashion. A Novel, in three volumes. By the author of A Summer at Brighton, &c. &c. London: J. F. Hughes, 1808.
- The Heir of Drumcondra; or, Family Pride. In Three Volumes. By Mary Julia Young, author of The Summer at Weymouth, The Summer at Brighton, Donalda, Rosemount Castle, East Indian, &c. &c. London: Minerva Press, 1810.

=== Translations ===
- Naubert, Christiana Benedicta Eugenie. Lindorf and Caroline; or, The Danger of Credulity. In Three Vols. Translated from the German of Professor Kramer, by Mary Julia Young, Author of Rose Mount Castle; The East Indian; The Kinsmen of Naples; Poems, &c. London: B. Crosby and Co., 1803.
- Berthier, J. B. C. The Mother and Daughter. A Pathetic Tale, by Mary Julia Young, Author of Moss Cliffe Abbey, Kinsmen of Naples, Rose Mount Castle, East Indian, &c. &c. In Three Volumes. London: J. F. Hughes, 1804.
- Voltaire (pseud.) [Arquet, François-Marie]. Voltairiana. In four volumes, selected and translated from the French by Mary Julia Young, author of Donalda, or the Witches of Glenswhiel; Moss Cliff Abbey; Right and Wrong, &c. London: J. F. Hughes, 1805.

=== Biography ===
- Memoirs of Mrs. Crouch. Including a Retrospect of the Stage, during the Years she Performed. By M. J. Young. London: James Asperne, 1806.

=== Etexts ===
- Rose-mount castle (1798) (Vols. 1, 2, 3, Internet Archive)
- Right and Wrong; or, The Kinsmen of Naples (1803) (Online, HathiTrust)
- Naubert, Christiana Benedicta Eugenie. Lindorf and Caroline; or, The Danger of Credulity. Trans. Mary Julia Young, 1803. (Vol. 1, Google)
- Memoirs of Mrs. Crouch. Including a Retrospect of the Stage, during the Years she Performed. 1806. (Online, HathiTrust; Vol. 1 & 2, Google)

== See also ==
- List of Minerva Press authors
- Mothers of the Novel: 100 Good Women Writers Before Jane Austen

== Notes and references ==
=== References ===
- Minerva Press, British Fiction 1800–1829 Database
- Feldman, Paula R. "Mary Julia Young." British women poets of the Romantic era: an anthology. Baltimore, Md.: Johns Hopkins University Press, 1997, pp. 844-845. (Open access, Internet Archive)
- Lloyd, N. S. "Mary Julia Young: A Biographical and Bibliographical Study." Romantic Textualities: Literature and Print Culture, 1780–1840, 18 (Summer 2008).Accessed 2022-12-26.
- Lloyd, Nicola. "The Fiction of Mary Julia Young: female trade-Gothic and Romantic genre-mixing." Women's Authorship and the Early Gothic: Legacies and Innovations. Ed. Kathleen Hudson. Cardiff: University of Wales Press, 2020, pp. 113-155.
- "Mary Julia Young." Orlando: Women’s Writing in the British Isles from the Beginnings to the Present. Cambridge UP. Accessed 2022-12-26.
- Spender, Dale. Mothers of the novel: 100 good women writers before Jane Austen. London/NY:Pandora, 1986. (Internet Archive)
- "Young, Mary Julia." The Women's Print History Project, 2019, Person ID 607. Accessed 2022-12-26.
