= Charlotte MacCarthy =

Irish novelist and religious writer

Charlotte McCarthy
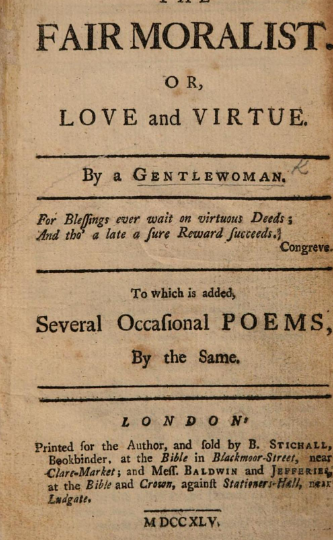
- The Fair Moralist by Charlotte MacCarthy
- Born: before 1745; Ireland
- Died: after 1768
- Occupation: writer
- Writing career
- Pen name: Gentlewoman; Prudentia Christiana
- Period: fl. 1745-68
- Genres: novels and religious

Charlotte McCarthy or Charlotte MacCarthy (fl. 1745-68) was an Irish novelist and religious writer. She published five works including The Fair Moralist.

== Life ==
MacCarthy's early life is mostly unknown, but it was Protestant and in Ireland. According to MacCarthy her father, a gentleman, died leaving her little. She had a religious episode during a vigil with her dead mother's body. She believed that she had been poisoned by an unknown "Jesuit" which damaged her for life.

She gave lessons to girls and she came to public notice when she published The Fair Moralist in 1745. The book's success surprised MacCarthy as she notes in a second edition in the following year. She had included some of her poetry in the first edition and she added more to the second. She also included advice to women readers about how to avoid characteristics including gossip, cruelty, addiction to fashion, fortune telling, gossip, and revenge. Her work was noted for "refreshing coarseness" and this book was later noted for its lesbian encounters and a "Boccaccio episode".

She published a dramatic dialogue, The Author and the Bookseller, in 1765, though it was never produced. In 1767 she published her last known book Justice and Reason faithful guides to truth.

Her last published writing was an article in 1768 in the Monthly Review where she used the nom de plume of Prudentia Christiana in an open letter addressed to the Bishop of London (Humphrey Henchman) concerning the poor moral state of the country.

No details are known of her fate after 1768.

== Legacy ==
MacCarthy was named by Dale Spender as one of the "Mothers of the novel" in Mothers of the Novel: 100 Good Women Writers Before Jane Austen.
