= Eliza Bromley =

English novelist and translator (fl. 1784–1803)

- Born: Eliza Nugent
- Occupations: Novelist and translator
- Years active: 1784–1803

Eliza Bromley (née Eliza Nugent) (fl. 1784–1803) was an English novelist and translator.

Mrs Bromley was the widow of an army officer.

She is one of the "lost" women writers listed in Dale Spender's Mothers of the Novel: 100 Good Women Writers Before Jane Austen (1986).

== Works ==
- Laura and Augustus: an Authentic Story (1784)
- Ivey Castle: a novel: containing interesting memoirs of two ladies, late nuns in a French abolished convent (1794)
- The Cave of Cosenza: a Romance of the Eighteenth Century (1803) (translated from an Italian original)
- The History of Sir Charls Bentinck, Bart. And Louisa Cavendish. A novel, in three volumes. By the author of Laura and Augustus (1788).
