= Women Writing About Money =

1995 non-fiction book by Edward Copeland

Women Writing About Money: Women's Fiction in England, 1790-1820
- Author: Edward Copeland
- Language: English
- Subject: Women's fiction
- Publisher: Cambridge University Press
- Publication date: 1995
- Publication place: United States
- Pages: 291 pp.
- ISBN: 0521454611
- OCLC: 30109106

Women Writing About Money: Women's Fiction in England is a 1995 non-fiction book by Edward Copeland.

== Book information ==
The book is about the lives of women in Jane Austen's time who had no legal access to money, but were held responsible for domestic expenditure. The book talks about the professional lives of women authors, their publishers, and their profits.

== Reception ==
Amanda Gilroy, of Romanticism, reviewed the book saying, "These cavils aside, Copeland provides a wealth of contextual material. He has undertaken the type of assiduous research that makes Women Writing About Money a fascinating history of the relations between economic details and gender in the period. It will be up to other Romantic scholars to investigate further the insight that 'systems of consumption and systems of discourse are not by any means independent of one another." It won a prize for One of Choice's Outstanding Academic Books for 1995.
