= Mary Ann Hanway =

Mary Ann Hanway was an eighteenth-century travel writer and novelist. She has been proposed as the anonymous author of Journey to the Highlands of Scotland (1777).

Hanway was also the author of Christabelle, the Maid of Rouen (1814), in which a woman's father loses their family's fortune, and she joins a nunnery, Ellinor (1798), and Andrew Stuart (1800). Hanway did not always find the process of writing easy, declaring in the preface to her 1809 novel Falconbridge Abbey, that "four years it has been procrastinated, from a series of ill health, having laid dormant in my desk for six months together!".

Hanway declared in Ellinor that "There are very few arts or sciences that women are not capable of acquiring, were they educated with the same advantages as men".

== Bibliography ==
- A Journey to the Highlands of Scotland. With Occasional Remarks on Dr. Johnson's Tour: By a Lady. (London: John Fielding and John Walker II, 1776).
- Ellinor, or, The World as It Is. (4 vols. London: Minerva Press, 1798)
- Andrew Stuart, or the northern wanderer. A novel. (4 vols. London: Minerva Press, 1800).
- Falconbridge Abbey. A Devonshire Story. (5 vols. London: Minerva Press, 1809).
- Christabelle, The Maid of Rouen. A Novel, Founded on Facts. (4 vols. London: Longman, Hurst, Rees, Orme, and Brown, 1814).

== See also ==
- List of Minerva Press authors
- Minerva Press
- Mothers of the Novel: 100 Good Women Writers Before Jane Austen
