= Susanna Keir =

British novelist

Susanna Keir, née Harvey (1747 – 20 November 1802) was a British novelist. Her two novels, "largely in epistolatory form, are long on moralizing and short on action."

== Life ==
Susanna Harvey married the chemist and poet James Keir, a friend of Erasmus Darwin and Joseph Priestley and supporter of the French Revolution. At the time of their marriage, another acquaintance, William Small, wrote "Mr Keir has turned glassmaker at Stourbridge and has married a beauty".

Though his manufacturing business was based in Birmingham and Dudley, Susanna wrote her novels while living in Edinburgh. The couple had two children. Their son Francis died in infancy, and their daughter, Amelia, married a banker, John Lewis Moilliet. Amelia wrote a privately printed biography of her father in 1859. She recorded that the death of her mother Susanna occurred suddenly on 20 November 1802, and that she was buried at West Bromwich.

Keir is one of the "lost" women writers listed by Dale Spender in Mothers of the Novel: 100 Good Women Writers Before Jane Austen.

== Works ==
- ("by a lady") Interesting Memoirs, 1785.
- ("by the author of Interesting Memoirs") The History of Miss Greville, Dublin, Edinburgh & London, 1787.
