= Elizabeth Ryves =

Eliza Ryves
- Born: 1750; Ireland
- Died: 1797 (aged 46–47); London, England
- Occupation: Writer
- Writing career
- Period: 1777–89

Elizabeth Ryves (1750 – 29 April 1797) was an Irish author, poet, dramatist, novelist, journalist, and translator.

== Biography ==
Eliza Ryves came from an old wealthy Irish family connected with Bruno Ryves. Her father was a long-serving Irish army officer and when he died she was swindled out of her inheritance "by the chicanery of the law." Poverty stricken, Ryves travelled to London in 1775 to petition the government, unsuccessfully, for her inheritance, as well as to try to make a living as a writer. She produced work in an assortment of genres including plays, poetry, political journalism, and a novel entitled The Hermit of Snowden (1789), which is thought to be autobiographical. Ryves commonly wrote for magazines without payment. The poetry of her later years displays her Whig politics and was directed toward public figures.

In addition to being an author, Ryves learned French in order to translate several works into English including The Social Contract (Jean-Jacques Rousseau), Raynal's Letter to the National Assembly, and Review of the Constitutions of the Principal States of Europe by Jean-François Delacroix. She had begun to translate Jean Froissart's work, but gave up when it proved to be too difficult.

In 1777, Ryves had published a volume of poems entitled Poems on Several Occasions which was originally subscription based. Ryves was given £100 as payment for two of her dramatic plays, but neither were produced: a comedic opera in three parts, The Prude (1777), and The Debt of Honour. According to Isaac D'Israeli, with whom she was acquainted, Ryves had written all of the historical and political sections of The Annual Register for some time.

Ryves died poor and unmarried in April 1797 while living off Tottenham Court Road in London. A story published in The Gentleman's Magazine 67 (July 1797) after her death noted that Ryves had spent the last of her money buying a piece of meat to help feed a starving family that lived above her. D'Israeli extended her much compassion and praise in his Calamities of Authors (1812).

== Career ==
In The Monthly Review on An epistle to the Right Honourable Lord John Cavendish, late Chancellor of the Exchequer in 1784, a writer described: "This panegyrical Epistle seems to have been dictated by a sincere respect for the character which is the subject of it. The sentiments are just; and they are expressed, if not inelegant, yet in spirited verse."

An excerpt from "A Song," from Poems on several occasions, laments the loss of someone close:

Oblivion! sweet balm of our woes,
Where, where thy calm spring shall I find?
Its wave shall restore my repose,
And banish his form from my mind.

Ryse's The Hastiniad; an heroic poem. In three cantos is described as a "pro-Whig burlesque in the manner of the notable Whig satirist John Wolcot." The poem itself is a mock epic satirizing Warren Hastings, when he came back to England as the Governor-General of India to face corruption charges and impeachment. In this selection, Ryves praises the Indian rulers for their patriotism in face of threat from the British:

Oh, glorious Chiefs! what northern sphere
Shall e'er such gen'rous Kings revere
As you, with patriot love replete,
Who pour'd your stores at Hasting's feet?

== Selected works ==
- Poems on several occasions (1777)
- Ode to the Rev. Mr. Mason (1780)
- Dialogue in the Elysian fields, between Caesar and Cato (1784)
- An epistle to the Right Honourable Lord John Cavendish, late Chancellor of the Exchequer (1784)
- The Hastiniad; an heroic poem. In three cantos (London: Debrett's, 1785)
- Ode to the Right Honourable Lord Melton, infant son of Earl Fitzwilliam (1787)
- The hermit of Snowden: or memoirs of Albert and Lavinia (1789)
