= Mary Champion de Crespigny =

English writer (1749–1812)

- Born: Mary Clarke c. 1749
- Died: July 12, 1812 (aged 62–63) Richmond House, Richmond
- Notable works: The Pavilion
- Spouse: Sir Claude Champion de Crespigny, 1st Baronet (1734–1818)
- Children: Sir William Champion de Crespigny, 2nd Baronet (1765–1829)

Mary Champion de Crespigny (née Clarke; c. 1749 – 12 July 1812) was an English novelist and letter writer.

== Personal life ==
Mary Clarke was born c. 1749, her parents' only daughter.

She married Sir Claude Champion de Crespigny, 1st Baronet. They had one child, a son named William, born on 1 January 1765. William was educated at Eton College and Trinity Hall, Cambridge and was MP for Southampton 1818–1826.

A keen archer, Lady de Crespigny was appointed Lady Patroness of the Royal Toxophilite Society in 1801. She promoted archery as a pastime for women and held archery fêtes at her home at Grove House, Camberwell.

She died at Richmond House on 12 July 1812.

== Writing ==
Around 1780, Mary Champion de Crespigny wrote a series of letters to her son, William, then aged 15. These were published as Letters of Advice from a Mother to her Son in 1803 and were dedicated to John Moore, the Archbishop of Canterbury.

In 1796, she published her only novel, The Pavilion, in four volumes.

She is one of the "lost" women writers listed by Dale Spender in Mothers of the Novel: 100 Good Women Writers Before Jane Austen.
