= Charlotte Palmer =

English writer and teacher, c. 1762–1834 or after

- Born: about 1762
- Died: 1834 or after

Charlotte Palmer (c. 1762–1834 or after) was an English teacher and writer mentioned in the Dictionary of National Biography. She is remembered mainly as a novelist.

== Life and writings ==
Palmer, thought to have been born in 1762, gained notice with a five-volume epistolary novel, Female Stability; or the History of Miss Belville, published in 1780. The preface asserts that the book is a true story written by a sister who had since died.

Palmer published two more works in the 1790s: Letters on several subjects from a preceptress to her pupils who have left school in 1791, and A Newly-Invented Copybook in 1797. Both were aimed at the educational market and the latter came with an apology from the woman author to male schoolteachers and the assurance that she was not attempting to usurp their authority.

Palmer's two other works were Integrity and Content: an Allegory and the intriguingly titled It Is and It Is Not a Novel, both published in 1792. An account of the latter appears in The Novel: An Alternative History, 1600–1800, which was not published until 2002.

Palmer continued to run schools until she was arrested for debt. In time she cleared the debt and was last identified in 1834.
