= Jean Marishall =

Jean Marishall (Jane Marshall) (fl. 1765–1788) was a Scottish novelist and dramatist. She was employed by the publisher John Newbery as a writer for the young. As a novelist she was influenced by Samuel Richardson.

== Works ==
Marishall published:

- The History of Miss Clarinda Cathcart and Miss Fanny Kenton, October 1765, a sentimental epistolary novel. A second edition appeared in 1760, and a third in 1767.
- The History of Alicia Montagu, by the Author of Clarinda Cathcart, 1767, 2 vols.
- Sir Harry Gaylove, or Comedy in Embryo, 1772, printed in Edinburgh, with a prologue by Thomas Blacklock, an epilogue by Hugh Downman, and a preface by herself.
- A Series of Letters for the Improvement of Youth, 1788.

== Notes ==
=== Attribution ===
- This article incorporates text from a publication now in the public domain: Lee, Sidney, ed. (1893). "Marshall, Jane". Dictionary of National Biography. Vol. 36. London: Smith, Elder & Co.
