= Phebe Gibbes =

English novelist and early feminist

Phebe Gibbes (died 1805) was an 18th-century English novelist and early feminist. She authored twenty-two books between 1764 and 1790, and is best known for the novels The History of Mr Francis Clive (1764), The Fruitless Repentance; or, the History of Miss Kitty Le Fever (1769), and The History of Miss Eliza Musgrove (1769). She received recent attention with the scholarly publication of Hartly House Calcutta (1789) in 2007.

== Biography ==
Phebe Gibbes possesses one of the most elusive histories of the 18th-century women writers. Almost all of the information on Gibbes' life is derived from an application to the Royal Literary Fund for financial support in 1804. As noted in her application, Gibbes, a widow for most of her life, married early and mothered two daughters and one son. One can conjecture that she spent part of her life in British India, as some of her novels, particularly Hartly House, avow a markedly accurate knowledge of Indian lifestyle as perceived through contemporary records. It is also known that Gibbes' son never returned from a military mission in India, a fact that is manifest in her later writing; she writes in the first lines of Hartly House, “the Eastern world is, as you pronounce it, the grave of thousands”.

The financial mismanagement of Gibbes’ father-in-law, a compulsive gambler, was the eventual cause of her extreme poverty; parental neglect and a strong aversion to gambling are manifest in many of Gibbes' novels.

== Career ==
=== Author ===
Gibbes first entered the world of English literature with a double-debut in 1764: the controversial The Life and Adventures of Mr. Francis Clive (1764) and the epistolary novel, History of Lady Louisa Stroud, and the Honorable Miss Caroline Stretton (1764). Three years after her debut, Gibbes published two novels, The Woman of Fashion; or, the History of Lady Diana Dormer (1767) and The History of Miss Pittsborough (1767), a novel especially lauded by the Critical Review as "chaste" and "virtuous". Two years later, Gibbes published The History of Miss Somerville (1769); The Fruitless Repentance; or, the History of Miss Kitty Le Fever (1769), and The History of Miss Eliza Musgrove (1769). The Critical Review wrote positively of Miss Eliza Musgrove, citing Gibbes' novel as "equal in genius to Lennox, Brookes, and Scott." Gibbes continued to produce novels until Hartly House, Calcutta in 1789; she may have created works into the 1790s, but if so they are unverified or also attributed to other writers.

Gibbes claims, in her 1804 application to the Royal Literary Fund, some 22 titles; but only 14 of Gibbes' novels (or potential novels) are actually traceable. Like many writers of her time, she wrote anonymously, with the exception of The Niece; or the History of Sukey Thornby (1788), which she signed "Mrs. P. Gibbes".

Gibbes’ writing provides descriptive accounts of her visits to India and the American continent. She names the precise titles of the servants and the exact prices of items. Her work therefore provides a resource for Indologists.

Gibbes in her later life earned her living by writing. She appears to cherish the epicurean lifestyles of the contemporary upper-class, while also critiquing the gross materialism of her era. She often describes a lush material culture, and at the same time causes her protagonist to reject that culture.

=== Social protests ===
Several contemporary issues surface multiple times in Gibbes' writing: child neglect, lack of female education, acquisitiveness, gambling, and personal vanity. Many of her heroines, particularly Sophia 'Goldborne' – a somewhat onomastic name – are stark contrasts to the materialistic, indulgent culture of the time, as discussed above; and yet at the same time, appear to relish female materialism. One can see in this scene in which Gibbes creates a vivid picture of extravagance, this slightly awe-filled distaste at both the foolishness and the power involved in materialism,

"The Europe shops, as you will naturally conclude, are those ware-houses where all the British finery imported is displayed and purchased; and such is the spirit of many ladies upon visiting them, that there have been :instances of their spending 30 or 40,000 rupees [about 5000 pounds] in one morning, for the decoration of their persons; on which account many husbands are observed to turn pale as ashes, on the bare mention of their wives :being seen to enter them: but controul is not a matrimonial rule at Calcutta; and the men are obliged to make the best of their conjugal mortifications.”

One can conclude that these scenes serve to express her distaste for the ‘materialistic’ nature of some English women; and yet, Gibbes finds a power in this ability for women to ‘control’ their spouses or fathers through expenditure.

Gibbes is especially known for her protests against the lack of early education for girls. Gibbes was particularly inspired by the comparatively free lifestyle for women in America, and in fact was sometimes construed as a Republican. In Her Friendship in a Nunnery; or, The American Fugitive, the narrator, a fourteen-year-old American girl, is so well-spoken and eloquent that the Critical Review reviled the novel, writing, "what may not be expected from the old men and sages of [America], when its maidens, its babes and sucklings talk, write, and reason thus!" William Enfield, a well-regarded Unitarian minister and writer, however, applauded her novel as having,

"so much truth… that it merits attention in an age, in which it is become too fashionable for females to receive the last finishing of their education in a convent."

Particularly feministic is the accidental bigamous marriage of Elfrida, in the eponymous novel Elfrida, as well as the death of Hannah, the household servant in Mr Francis Clive, who suffers a painful and protracted demise after imbibing a faulty abortifacient (abortion-inducing poultice) from an apothecary when she becomes pregnant with Clive's child. These outrageous, yet plausible, situations made Gibbes’ novels somewhat polemic in her time.

The social protestation of these types of double standards for males and females predates those reactionary works of the later feminist writers, such as Mary Hays and Mary Wollstonecraft, by nearly forty years; Wollstonecraft had positively reviewed Gibbes' work.

== Selected works ==
- The Life and Adventures of Mr. Francis Clive (1764)
- History of Lady Louisa Stroud, and the Honorable Miss Caroline Stretton (1764)
- The Woman of Fashion; or, the History of Lady Diana Dormer (1767)
- The History of Miss Pittsborough (1767)
- The History of Miss Somerville (1769)
- The Fruitless Repentance; or, the History of Miss Kitty Le Fever (1769)
- The History of Miss Eliza Musgrove (1769)
- Modern Seduction, or Innocence Betrayed; Consisting of Several Histories of the Principal Magdalens (1777)
- Friendship in a Nunnery; or, The American Fugitive (1778)
- Elfrida; or Paternal Ambition (1786)
- Zoriada: or, Village Annals (1786) – unclear, as this novel is claimed by Gibbes, but had been previously attributed to Anne Hughes.
- The Niece; or the History of Sukey Thornby (1788)
- Harty House, Calcutta (1789). Republished in 1908, which was in turn republished in 1988/1989 in US and UK editions by Pluto Press. This bicentenary edition, with the subtitle "A Novel of the days of Warren Hasting", was prepared by Monica Clough, when the author was still unknown.
- Jemima: A Novel (1795) –unclear; attributed in its printing to ‘the author of Zoriada: or, Village Annals.’
- Heaven’s Best Gifts (1798) – unclear, as this novel is also attributed to ‘Mrs. Lucius Phillips’.
