= Arabella Plantin =

British writer

Arabella Plantin (born c. 1700) was an eighteenth-century British novelist. She was the author of The Ingrateful; or, The Just Revenge (1727) and Love Led Astray; or, The Mutual Inconstancy (1731).

The Ingrateful is a story of an Italian woman who murders her husband, after he has spent her fortune, and Love Led Astray is a pastoral tale of crossed lovers.

The literary critic Bridget G. MacCarthy in her 1944 study, The Female Pen, described Love Led Astray as "an absurd travesty of the pastoral tradition", with critic Brian Corman describing Plantin as a writer of "outmoded and highly artificial romances."
