= Anna Meades =

English novelist

Anna Meades (1734 - probably before 1779) was an English novelist.

== Early life ==
Meades was baptised on 18 October 1734 in Fordingham, Hampshire. She was the daughter of Frances Blachford (d. 1780) and the Reverend William Meades (1700-1780). Her father was the rector of All Saints' Church in Rampton, Cambridgeshire. She had a brother called William (baptised 12 March 1738).

== Career ==
She corresponded with Samuel Richardson from January 1757 until August 1758, initially under the soubriquet "Cleomira". She had initially approached him with the request that he publish her first novel. He declined but continued the correspondence, reading her novels and giving her comments and suggestions.

Both her novels were published anonymously. Scholars have argued the extent of Richardson's contributions to the second novel, The History of Sir William Harrington, which was advertised as having been revised and corrected by Richardson, a claim contested by his widow and daughters. This novel achieved sufficient success to permit a second edition to be brought out in 1787. In 1797 another edition was brought out, "revised and corrected by" a Mr Hull.

She was absent from her father's will of 1779, and may have been dead by then.

== Selected works ==
- The history of Cleanthes, an Englishman of the highest quality and Celemene, the illustrious Amazonian princess (1757)
- The History of Sir William Harrington (1771)
