= Jane Barker =

English writer and Jacobite (1652–1732)

Jane Barker (1652–1732) was a popular English fiction writer, poet, and a staunch Jacobite. She went into self-imposed exile when James II fled England during the Glorious Revolution in 1688. Her novels, The Amours of Bosvil and Galesia, also published as Love Intrigues (1713), Exilius or The Banish'd Roman (1715), A Patchwork Screen for the Ladies (1723), and The Lining of the Patchwork Screen for the Ladies (1726) were written after she returned to London in 1704. Prior to and during her exile, she wrote a collection of poems justifying the value of feminine education and female single life, "Poetical Recreations" (1688), and a group of political poems, "A Collection of Poems Referring to the Times" (1701), which conveyed her anxiety about the political future of England.

Although not known for her letter writing, four extant letters are located in the British Library and within the Magdalen Manuscript at the Oxford Magdalen library, written between 1670 and 1688. Jane Barker was one of the first female authors to publish writings both in manuscript and print form, allowing modern scholars to study "the passage of Barker's poetry from coterie circles to larger, more impersonal communities of readers" Never married, Jane Barker died quietly in 1732.

== Early life ==
Jane Barker was born in May 1652, in the village of Blatherwick, Northamptonshire, in England to Thomas Barker and Anne Connock. Anne Connock seems to be descended from an unlanded and Roman Catholic branch of the Connock family, which might explain Jane's Papist affiliation. A member of a royalist family, Jane Barker went into exile with James II once William of Orange entered England, threatening an overthrow of the outwardly Catholic James II. When Jane was 10 years old, Thomas Barker leased a property and manor in Wilsthorpe, Lincolnshire. This property was passed on to both Jane Barker and her mother upon her father's death in 1681 and she relocated to the property upon returning from exile in 1704.

As a young woman, Jane Barker was taught Latin, anatomy, and herbal medicine by her brother, Edward, who matriculated at St. John's College, Oxford in 1668 and earned his M.A. from Christ Church, Oxford, in 1674–5. Proof of Jane Barker's knowledge of medicine can be seen in the advertisement for Dr. Barker's Famous Gout Plaister, and in her poems about anatomy found in her "Poetical Recreations". Indebted to her brother for providing her with the basis of her education, Jane mourned his death in 1675, shortly after he finished his time at Oxford.

== Political affiliations and exile ==
Barker was baptized on 17 May 1652 according to the rites of the Church of England; however, she converted to Catholicism during reign of James II (of England), between 1685 and 1688. After James' defeat by the Prince of Orange (William III) in the Glorious Revolution, London became a dangerous place for Catholics, prompting Barker to follow James II to exile in France.

Following an ideology of Jacobitism, and a royalist, Jane Barker was one of the 40,000 people who followed James II in exile to France. She was one of the smaller number of individuals who maintained residence at Saint-Germain-en-Laye in 1689. James II maintained court in Château de Saint-Germain-en-Laye, a castle lent to the Stuarts by Louis XIV from 1689 to 1704.

Barker's Jacobite involvement is further evidenced in her letter to James Butler, 2nd Duke of Ormonde, who began organizing a Jacobite invasion from France. Dated 19 March 1718, the letter implicitly informed Ormonde that his supporters in England awaited his invasion. However, the letter was intercepted in that same year by the British Secrete Office, the anti-Jacobite intelligence organization. Since Barker's name and handwriting were unknown to the government authorities, it is suspected that she was used as a ghost-writer for the letter—a technique used to protect plotters whose identities and handwriting were already well known by authorities.

== Major works ==
Poetical Recreations (1688)
A Collection of Poems Referring to the Times (1701)
Love Intrigues or The Amours of Bosvil and Galesia (1713)
Exilius; or The Banish'd Roman (1715)
The Christian Pilgrimage (1718)
A Patch-Work Screen for the Ladies (1723)
The Lining of the Patch-Work Screen for the Ladies (1726)

== Poetry ==
=== Poetical Recreations ===
Originally published in 1688, the first part of this two-part compilation comprises Barker's own poems addressed to her friends, and the second part contains poems written by Barker's friends addressed to Barker herself. Described as written by "several Gentlemen of the Universities, and Others," the second part of Poetical Recreations was written by contributors from Cambridge or Oxford University. Originally printed without the author's permission by Benjamin Crayle, the title page of Poetical Recreations boasted that poems within were "Occasionally written by Mrs. Jane Barker". Benjamin Crayle also contributed twelve poems in Part Two and expressed his admiration for Barker's literary taste. A note in what is now called the Magdalen Manuscript suggests that the publisher did not have Barker's permission to print the collection: it reads "now corrected by her own hand." The marginalia indicates that the initial collection was not yet meant for public consumption. Scholar Kathryn King finds evidence through marginal notations in the Magdalen Manuscript that Barker's works are autobiographical.

=== A Collection of Poems Referring to the Times ===
Written at the end of her time at Saint-Germaine-en-Laye, A Collection of Poems Referring to the Times is highly political and takes a pro-Stuart position. The speaker in the collection, Fidelia, is considered autobiographical. She is characterized as a Stuart loyalist and Catholic convert, depicting Barker's own political and religious affiliations. Upon returning to England, Jane Barker gifted a copy of her A Collection of Poems Referring to the Times to the son of James II for his birthday. The manuscript holding in the British Library is believed to contain a prototype copy of the collection.

== Prose ==
=== Love Intrigues or The Amours of Bosvil and Galesia ===
The Entertaining Novels of Mrs. Jane Barker

Originally printed in 1713 and revised and reprinted in 1719, Love Intrigues was the first installment in what came to be known as the Galesia Trilogy. It has been suggested that Bosvil's character was based heavily on a man whom Barker knew well. King suggests that the original edition of the novel in 1713 was not meant for publication because major revisions were made before it was reprinted, with a new title, in 1719. Love Intrigues was the first novel that Barker published, though probably without her permission, with Edmund Curll. Curll published some of her later works. It was suspected that Curll probably added the term "Amours" to the title for better commercial appeal.

=== Exilius or The Banish'd Roman ===
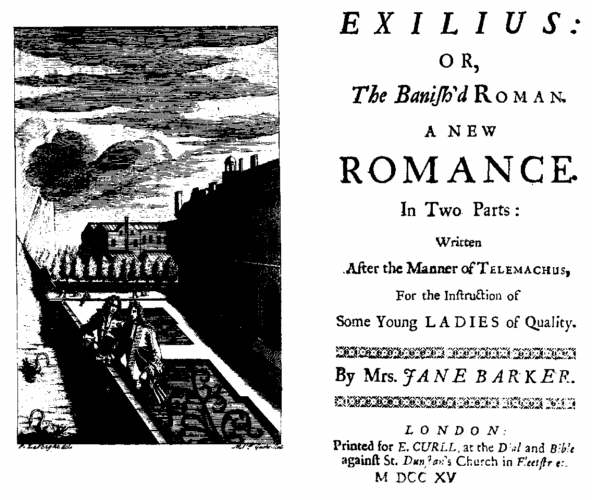
Title Page from the 1715 edition of Jane Barker's Exiles.

Published just after the death of Queen Anne in 1714, Exilius can be read as a pro-Stuart response to the succession crisis that followed Anne's death. There is some suggestion that Curll sped up the release of the work so that he could capitalize on the market potential during the political upheaval. This novel is understood to be a projection of Jacobite feeling through themes including romance, love, and heroism. Written primarily for a female audience, the male characters within the fiction are stock representations while female characters are developed virtuously and follow strict moral tenets. Jonathan Grieder states that formally the work is weak, but because it appeals to women during the early eighteenth century it can inform the reader about feminine interests during the time of its publication.

=== The Christian Pilgrimage ===
In 1718, Barker published her translation of a French Catholic devotional manual, The Christian Pilgrimage, originally written by François Fénelon, the archbishop of Cambrai. Translated as a response to the severe government reprisals on the Catholic community in England in early 1716, this devotional manual reframed a Protestants' understanding of Catholicism in order to discourage any further egregious actions against the Catholic community. Barker's translation of Fénelon's work offered a take on Catholicism that used the vocabulary of the Church of England; she removed extraneous Catholic representation from the original so as not to dissuade Protestant readership.

=== A Patch-Work Screen for the Ladies or, Love and Virtue and The Lining of the Patch Work Screen ===
Published in 1723, A Patch-Work Screen for the Ladies is based loosely on the Lettres Portugaises, published in 1669. The Lining of the Patch-Work Screen was written in 1726. Often recognized to be a blending of genre conventions including romance, bourgeois fiction, poems, hymns, odes, recipes, philosophical reflections, among others, the two works create a hybrid genre. Barker uses the metaphor of the patch-work screen to raise questions about politics, sexual politics, economics, and finance in her society. In A Patch-Work Screen for the Ladies, Barker includes autobiographical information and also includes revised poems from Poetical Recreations including "Anatomy," the poem which indicates Barker's proficiency in medicine.

== Gender issues ==
Capitalizing on the education she received from her brother, Barker established herself as an author within mostly male coteries during the second half of the seventeenth century. Barker worked to alleviate the stigma of spinsterhood and make it an acceptable alternative to marriage. A celibate woman, Barker belonged to the tradition of female martial valor and enjoyed her freedom from men in her own personal life. There is evidence that Barker used Katherine Philips' Orinda as a model for her own speaker, Fidelia, without including homosexual undertones that are present within Katherine Philips' writings. Barker established herself as a published female author whose print works were primarily for a female audience. Her dedications, "to the ladies," also suggest that she was writing for an elite female readership, although this dedication may have been included by Edmund Curll for marketing purposes.

== Legacy ==
Jane Barker was the first woman to firmly position herself as an author working with both manuscript and print media. Choosing to publish in both spheres gave both a mainstream readership as well as the more intimate coteries access to her work. Because of her interest in manuscript and print, Barker has one foot in the old world methods of circulating works and one in the modern market-place. Relying upon income from her later publications for money, Barker had more freedom and independence than other female authors of the early modern period. Depicted as an autobiographical author by Kathryn R. King, Jane Barker's works display a strong feminist bent, offering her readership information regarding single womanhood, female education and politics.

== References list ==
- King, Kathryn and Jeslyn Medoff. "Jane Barker and Her Life (1652–1732): The Documentary Record." Eighteenth Century Life. 21.3 (1997): 16–38.
- King, Kathryn R. "Barker, Jane (bap. 1652, d.1732)." Oxford Dictionary of National Biography. Oxford UP, 2004.
- King, Kathryn R. Jane Barker, Exile. Oxford: Clarendon Press, 2000. Print
- Mello, Patrick. "Barker, Jane." The Encyclopedia of British Literature 1660–1789. Wiley-Blackwell, 2015. Print.
- Pickard, Claire. "Jane Barker." Perdita. University of Warwickshire. Web. 25 October 2015.
- Wilson, Carol Shiner, ed. The Galesia Trilogy and Selected Manuscript Poems of Jane Barker. New York and Oxford: Oxford University Press, 1997.
