= Ann Masterman Skinn =

English novelist

- Born: Ann Emelinda Masterman; 1747 York, Yorkshire, England
- Died: March 23, 1789 (aged 41–42) Margate, Kent, England
- Occupation: Novelist

Ann Emelinda Skinn (née Masterman; 1747 – 1789) was an English novelist.

== Biography ==
Ann Masterman was born in 1747, most likely in York as she states on the title page of her work, The Old Maid; or, the History of Miss Ravensworth, that York is her "native place." She was described in the 1780s as the "grand-daughter and heiress of Henry Masterman, of Settrington, in the county of York, Esq."

In June 1767, Masterman married William Skin. She left the marriage about 16 months after their wedding, then began an affair with a young law clerk named Matthew Bourne. Her husband sued her for divorce on the grounds of adultery and won his case.

Masterman is the author of only one known work, The Old Maid; or, the History of Miss Ravensworth, written in 1770 and published in 1771. The work has been interpreted by scholars as her response to the divorce proceedings and as "wish fulfilment about how things might be if women had control of their lives." The work insists on a woman's right to be able to do as she wishes.

Alongside her writing, Masterman is said to have tried to earn money by doing needlework and running a school. She died in poverty on 23 March 1789 in Margate, Kent, at the age of 41.

== Publication ==
- The old maid; or, the History of Miss Ravensworth. In a series of letters. By Mrs. Skinn, Late Miss Masterman, of York. In three volumes. Printed for J. Bell at his Circulating-Library, near Exeter-Exchange, in the Strand; and C. Etherington, at York, 1771.
