= Jane West (novelist) =

English writer (1758–1852)

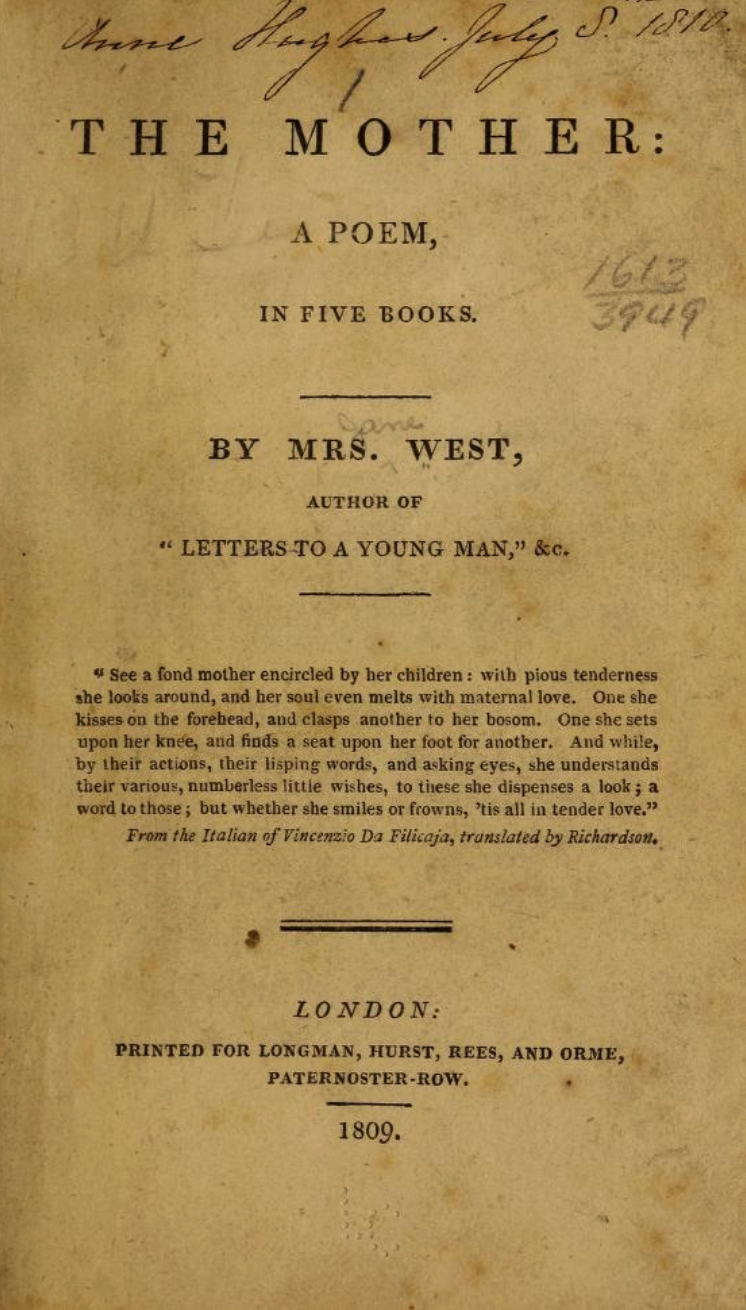
Title page of Jane West's The Mother: A Poem, in five books, 1809 (Etext, Internet Archive)

Jane West (1758–1852), was an English novelist who published as Prudentia Homespun and Mrs. West. She also wrote conduct literature, poetry and educational tracts.

== Life ==
Jane West was born to Jane and John Iliffe in London, but the family moved to Desborough in Northamptonshire when she was eleven. By 1783 she was married to Thomas West (died 1823), a yeoman farmer of Little Bowden, Leicestershire. They had three sons: Thomas (1783–1843), John (1787–1841), and Edward (1794–1821). In 1800 she wrote to the man of letters Thomas Percy, bishop of Dromore, seeking his patronage and describing herself as self-instructed and interested in poetry from an early age. She benefited from his acquaintance and visited him in 1810. Although her literary connections were never extensive, she also corresponded with Sarah Trimmer and wrote a series of poems in praise of women writers: Trimmer, Elizabeth Carter, Charlotte Smith, whom she visited in Ireland, and Anna Seward.

== Conservatism ==
West's writing is consistently conservative and didactic, but she advocated expanding education for women. Her works serve as a counterpoint to the revolutionary politics of the day: A Tale of the Times (1799) is anti-Jacobin; The Infidel Father (1802) attacks atheism; and one of her conduct texts, Letters to a Young Lady, "forms an ideological counterpart to Mary Wollstonecraft's Vindication of the Rights of Woman (1792). Though she was called "strident," her writing was popular in its day for its "improving" qualities. Letters to a Young Man (1801), for example, went through six editions by 1818. Her poems appeared in journals and anthologies and she was a longstanding contributor to the Gentleman's Magazine. Her dramas seem to have been less in tune with popular taste and were not successful. Although she claimed to consider her womanly domestic duties more important — "My needle always claims the pre-eminence of my pen. I hate the name of 'rhyming slattern.'" — there are signs that she actively sought success as a writer. She died at Little Bowden at the age of 94, feeling out of step with trends at that time.

== Sources ==
West is best known today as the author of a novel that served as a source text for Jane Austen's Sense and Sensibility (1811). Her novel A Gossip's Story (1796), like Austen's novel, features two sisters, one full of rational sense and the other of romantic, emotive sensibility. West's romantic sister shares the same name as Austen's: Marianne. There are further textual similarities, described in the Valancourt Classics 2015 edition of the novel. Austen significantly reworked West's plot and characters to suit her own vision, as Shakespeare had done with the works of forebears before her.

West, on the other hand, drew on Austen's fiction in her critically neglected last novel, Ringrove; Or, Old-Fashioned Notions (1827), with similarities to Austen's Emma (1816). Ringrove and Emma share elements "from characters' names (Emma, Harriet, Smith) to character types (heiress, governess, widower, farmer)" to "more minute relationship difficulties".

== Works ==
=== Fiction ===
- The Advantages of Education, or The History of Maria Williams (as "Prudentia Homespun", 2 vols, 1793)
- A Gossip's Story, and a Legendary Tale (as "Prudentia Homespun", 2 vols, 1796)
- A Tale of the Times (3 vols, 1799)
- The Infidel Father (3 vols, 1802)
- The Refusal (1810)
- The Loyalists: an Historical Novel (1812)
- Alicia de Lacy: an Historical Romance (4 vols., 1814)
- Ringrove, or, Old Fashioned Notions (1827)
- The Sorrows of Selfishness (children's story, as "Prudentia Homespun")

=== Conduct literature ===
- Letters to a Young Man (3 vols, 1801)
- Letters to a Young Lady (1806)

=== Poetry ===
- Miscellaneous Poetry, Written at an Early Period of Life (1786)
- The Humours of Brighthelmstone: a Poem (1788)
- Miscellaneous Poems, and a Tragedy(as Edmund, York, 1791)
- An Elegy on the Death of the Right Honourable Edmund Burke (1797)
- Poems and Plays (Vols 1 and 2, 1799, 3 and 4, 1805)
- The Mother: a Poem in Five Books (1799)

=== Other works ===
- Select Translations of the Beauties of Massillon (1812)
- Scriptural Essays Adapted to the Holy Days of the Church of England (2 vols, 1816)

== Resources ==
- Gail Baylis, "West, Jane (1758–1852)." Oxford Dictionary of National Biography, ed. H. C. G. Matthew and Brian Harrison, Oxford: OUP, 2004. Online ed. Lawrence Goldman. January 2006. Retrieved 11 April 2007
- Roger Lonsdale, ed. "Jane West (née Iliffe)", Eighteenth-Century Women Poets, New York: Oxford University Press, 1989, pp. 379–385
- Devoney Looser, "Admiration and Disapprobation: Jane Austen's Emma (1816) and Jane West's Ringrove (1827)," Essays in Romanticism, vol. 26, no. 1, (2019), pp. 41–54 doi.org/10.3828/eir.2019.26.1.4
- West, Jane (2015) [1796], Looser, Devoney; O'Connor, Melinda; Kelly, Caitlin (eds.), A Gossip's Story, Richmond, Virginia: Valancourt Books, ISBN 978-1943910151
