= Eliza Fenwick =

English author and children's writer (1797–1840)

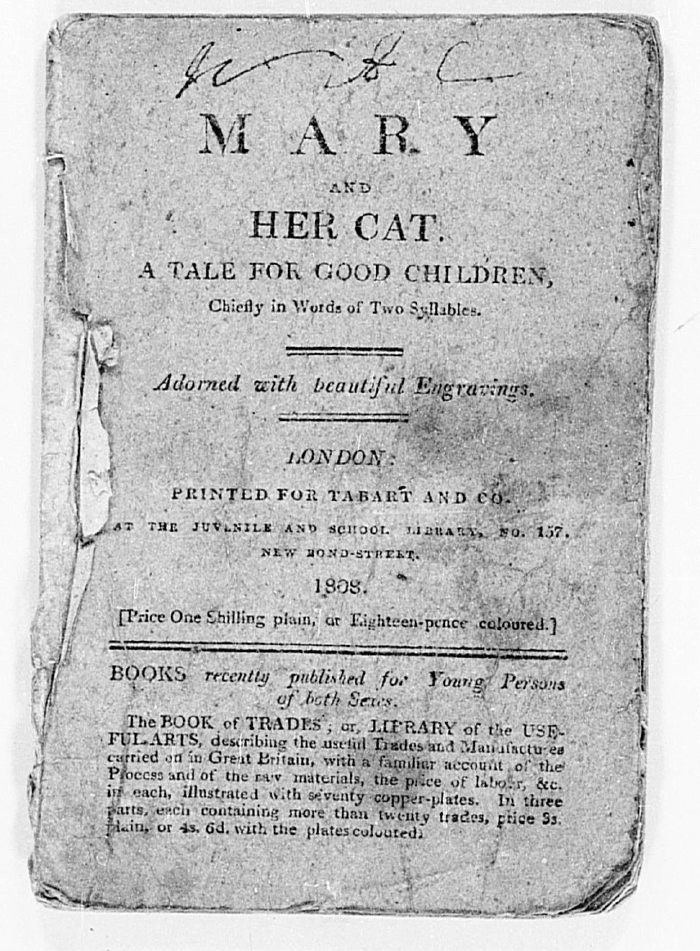
- Cover of the 1808 edition of Mary and Her Cat
- Born: Eliza Jaco; 1 February 1767; Pelynt, Cornwall, England
- Died: 8 December 1840 (aged 73); Providence, Rhode Island, United States
- Occupation: writer
- Spouse: John Fenwick
- Children: Eliza Anne Rutherford; Orlando Fenwick
- Writing career
- Pen name: E.F.; A Woman; Rev. David Blair
- Notable works: Secresy; or The Ruin on the Rock (1795); Mary and Her Cat (1804); Visits to the Junior Library (1805)

Eliza Fenwick (née Jaco; 1 February 1766 – 8 December 1840) was a Cornish author, whose works include Secresy; or The Ruin on the Rock (1795) and several children's books. She was born in Cornwall, married John Fenwick and had two children by him. She left him and eventually went to live with her children in Barbados, where she ran a school with her daughter.

== Biography ==
Eliza Jaco was born on 1 February 1766 at Pelynt, Cornwall. Her parents were Peter and Elizabeth Jaco (née Hawkswotorth), and she was baptized Elizabeth on 25 June 1766. She married in the 1780s the writer John Fenwick, who became an alcoholic and fell in debt. They had two children, Eliza and Orlando. She took up tasks such as working as a governess to make family ends meet, but eventually left Fenwick and moved to Ireland as a governess in 1807.

By this time, Fenwick's daughter had moved to the West Indies to be an actress, and married William Rutherford, by whom she had four children. Fenwick and her son, Orlando, joined her daughter in Barbados in 1814, but Orlando died of yellow fever in 1816. In 1819, Fenwick's son-in-law left the family, leaving the mother and daughter to bring up the four children. The pair ran a secondary school, which provided income and ensured the children's own education. Fenwick owned several enslaved people who worked in the school and her household.

Fenwick's daughter died in 1828, leaving her to raise her grandchildren alone. By 1835 she was living in the United States, and she died in 1840 in Providence, Rhode Island.

== Writing ==
Throughout her life Fenwick corresponded with friends who included Mary Hays, Thomas Holcroft, William Godwin, Mary Wollstonecraft, Charlotte Turner Smith, and Charles and Mary Lamb. Much of the correspondence survives. Her epistolary novel Secresy; or The Ruin on the Rock was published as "By a Woman" in 1795. Her subsequent works were written for children, sometimes under the pseudonym Rev. David Blair. Mary and Her Cat (1804) was advertised as being "in words not exceeding two syllables". Visits to the Junior Library (1805, facsimile 1977) tells of a ghastly West Indian family with a slave nurse being "reclaimed by discovering the joys of learning."
