= Anne Ker =

English novelist

Anne Ker (née Phillips; 17 November 1766 – c. 5 December 1821) was an English writer who published six novels between 1799 and 1817. She aimed for commercial success, writing in the popular Romance and Gothic genres.

Anne Ker's writing was supported financially by a number of subscribers, including Lady Jerningham, wife of the writer Lord Jerningham, and the Princess of Wales, Caroline of Brunswick. Her marriage into the Ker family, which was headed by the third Duke of Roxburghe, John Ker, is also thought to have assisted her creative work.

== Literary significance ==
Rachel Howard, compiler of Ker's biography for the journal Reading the Romantic Text, writes that Ker was a 'determined and outspoken character whose bold opinions on fiction contributed to contemporary debates about women's reading and writing'.

Although critically unsuccessful, Ker's writing appealed to readers through her imitation of popular writers such as Ann Radcliffe, and with her morally ambiguous presentation of social issues, for instance sexual promiscuity, prostitution, and portrayal of lower-class characters. Howard argues that the popularity of Ker's work with readers compared to critics gives literary historians insight into the biases of critics of the Romantic era who favoured morally conservative or religious texts, and disapproved of imitation.

'The Heiress de Montalde is a wretched imitation of Mrs. Radcliffe's manner, but the black horror of the mysterious tale is not brightened by a single ray of that lady's genius. The plot is confused, the incidents contemptible, and the language destitute of all characteristic propriety. - New London Review.

== Life ==
Anne Philips was born to John and Ann Philips, of Cheyne Walk, Chelsea. A sampler commemorating her birth includes the arms of the family, a chained lion rampant.

John Gladstone Steele suggests that a Louisa Carr (later Peterson), born in 1786, with parents given as John and Anne Carr is in fact the daughter of John and Anne Ker. He suggests that the difference in the spelling of Anne and John Ker's surname on Louisa's birth certificate may indicate that Louisa was born and baptised secretly, before the pair would marry secretly in 1788.

Later in life, Ker feel into financial hardship and illnesses. She appealed to the Royal Literary Fund for assistance six times from 1820 to 1821, but only two of her appeals were successful, each granted £5. She died aged fifty-four, in 1821, suffering from gout.

== Works ==
- The Heiress di Montalde; or, the Castle of Bezanto: A Novel (1799)
- Adeline St Julian; or, the Midnight Hour, a Novel (1800)
- Emmeline; or, the Happy Discovery, a Novel (1801)
- The Mysterious Count; or, Montville Castle. A Romance (1803)
- Modern Faults, a Novel, Founded on Facts (1804)
- Edric, the Forester: Or, the Mysteries of the Haunted Chamber. An Historical Romance (1817).

A synopsis of each novel is available within Rachel Howard's biography of Ker.
