= Dale Spender =

Australian scholar (1943–2023)

Dale Spender AM AO
- Born: 22 September 1943; Newcastle, New South Wales, Australia
- Died: 21 November 2023 (aged 80); Brisbane, Queensland, Australia
- Education: Sydney University; University of London
- Partner: Professor Emeritus Edwin Thomas (Ted) Brown
- Relatives: Sir Percy Spender (great-uncle); Jean Spender (great-aunt)
- Writing career
- Notable works: Man Made Language (1980); Mothers of the Novel: 100 Good Women Writers Before Jane Austen (1986)

Dale Spender AM (22 September 1943 – 21 November 2023) was an Australian feminist scholar, teacher, writer and consultant. In 1983, Dale Spender was co-founder of and editorial advisor to Pandora Press, the first of the feminist imprints devoted solely to non-fiction, committed, according to The New York Times, to showing that "women were the mothers of the novel and that any other version of its origin is but a myth of male creation". She was the series editor of Penguin's Australian Women's Library from 1987. Spender's work is "a major contribution to the recovery of women writers and theorists and to the documentation of the continuity of feminist activism and thought".

== Early life and education ==
Dale Spender was born in Newcastle, New South Wales, Australia, on 22 September 1943. She was a great-niece of the politician Percy Spender and crime writer Jean Spender. Dale was the eldest of three children. She attended Burwood Girls High School in Sydney and she was a Kodak Girl.

She earned her MA from Sydney University and her PhD from the University of London.

== Career ==
In the late 1960s, as an MA graduate, she taught English and history at a boys' high school in Sydney's north-western suburbs and English literature at a co-educational high school. She started lecturing at James Cook University in 1974, before moving to London, where she published her PhD research as the book Man Made Language in 1980. In London, she joined the Fawcett Society, the organisation named after women's suffrage pioneer Millicent Garrett Fawcett.

Spender was a co-originator of the database WIKED (Women's International Knowledge Encyclopedia and Data) and founding editor of Pergamon's Athene Series and of Pandora Press, commissioning editor of the Penguin Australian Women's Library, and associate editor of the Great Women Series (United Kingdom).

She was particularly concerned with intellectual property and the effects of new technologies: in her terms, the prospects for "new wealth" and "new learning". For nine years, she was a director of Copyright Agency Limited (CAL) in Australia and for two years (2002–2004) she was the organisation's chair. She was also involved with the Second Chance Programme, which tackles homelessness among women in Australia.

=== Selected works ===
==== Man Made Language ====
In her 1980 book Man Made Language (published by Routledge and Kegan Paul), Spender argues that in patriarchal societies men control language and that it works in their favour. "Language helps form the limits of our reality. It is our means of ordering, classifying and manipulating the world" (1980:3). Where men perceive themselves as the dominant gender, disobedient women who fail to conform to their given inferior role are labelled as abnormal, promiscuous, neurotic or frigid. Spender draws parallels with how derogatory terms are used to maintain racism (1980:6). Man Made Language illustrates how linguistic determinism interconnects with economic determinism to oppress women in society and provides a wide breadth of analysis to do this. The book explores the assumed deficiencies of women, silencing, intimidation and the politics of naming.

==== Mothers of the Novel: 100 Good Women Writers Before Jane Austen ====
Spender's 1986 book for Pandora Press, Mothers of the Novel: 100 Good Women Writers Before Jane Austen, showed that the reputation of many deserving early women writers "had been sidelined by sexism".

==== Writing a New World: Two Centuries of Australian Women Writers ====
Spender published Writing a New World: Two Centuries of Australian Women Writers in 1988, the year when she returned to Australia, living in Brisbane, Queensland.

==== The Diary of Elizabeth Pepys ====
In 1991, Spender published a literary spoof, The Diary of Elizabeth Pepys (1991, Grafton Books, London). Purportedly written by Elisabeth Pepys, the wife of Samuel Pepys, the book is a feminist critique of women's lives in 17th-century London.

== Personal life and death ==
Spender had been in a relationship with Professor Ted Brown for close to five decades. They had no children. She consistently dressed in purple clothes, a choice she initially made for its symbolic reference to the suffragettes.

Dale Spender lived in Brisbane, Australia, where she died on 21 November 2023, at the age of 80. Announcing her death, Spender's family said that it was "a source of joy and humour in her life" that she shared a birthday with early radical feminist Christabel Pankhurst.

== Honours and recognition ==
In the 1996 Australia Day honours, Spender was appointed Member of the Order of Australia "for service to the community as a writer and researcher in the field of equality of opportunity and equal status for women". In 2001, Spender was awarded an Honorary Doctorate by Queensland University of Technology (QUT) for her "important contribution to scholarship and to the community".

== Publications ==
- The Spitting Image, Reflections on language, education and social class (Rigby, 1976). Co-author with Garth Boomer (ISBN 0-7270-0162-0)
- Man Made Language (Routledge & Kegan Paul, 1980)
- Learning to Lose: Sexism and Education (Women's Press, 1980). Co-editor with Elizabeth Sarah
- Men's Studies Modified: The Impact of Feminism on the Academic Disciplines (Pergamon Press, 1981)
- Invisible Women: The Schooling Scandal (Writers & Readers Ltd, 1982, Women's Press, 1989)
- Women of Ideas and What Men Have Done to Them: From Aphra Behn to Adrienne Rich (ARK Paperbacks, 1982)
- Feminist Theorists: Three Centuries of Women's Intellectual Traditions (Women's Press, 1983). Editor.
- There's Always Been a Women's Movement This Century (Pandora Press, 1983)
- Time and Tide Wait for No Man (Pandora Press, 1984)
- Scribbling Sisters (Hale and Iremonger, 1984; Camden Press, 1986). Co-author with Lynne Spender.
- For the Record: The Making and Meaning of Feminist Knowledge (Women's Press, 1985)
- How the Vote was Won and Other Suffragette Plays (Methuen, 1985). Co-editor with Carole Hayman).
- Mothers of the Novel: 100 Good Women Writers Before Jane Austen (Pandora Press, 1986). Includes a list of 106 little-known early women novelists.
- Series editor for Pandora Press Mothers of the Novel series (1986–89), which has republished novels by Mary Brunton, Frances Burney, Maria Edgeworth, Eliza Fenwick, Sarah Fielding, Mary Hamilton, Mary Hays, Eliza Haywood, Elizabeth Inchbald, Harriet Lee and Sophia Lee, Charlotte Lennox, Sydney Owenson, Amelia Opie, Frances Sheridan, and Charlotte Turner Smith.
- Reflecting Men at Twice Their Natural Size (Seaver Books/Henry Holt, 1987; HarperCollins Publishers, 1988; Fontana Press, 1989). Co-author with Sally Cline.
- The Education Papers. Women's Quest for Equality in Britain, 1850–1912 (Routledge, 1987). Editor.
- Writing a New World: Two Centuries of Australian Women Writers (Penguin Books, 1988)
- The Penguin Anthology of Australian Women's Writing (Penguin Books, 1988). Editor.
- The Writing or the Sex?, Or, Why You Don't Have to Read Women's Writing to Know It's No Good (Pergamon Press, Athene Series, 1989)
- Co-edited with Janet Todd, Anthology of British Women Writers: From the Middle Ages to the Present Day (Pandora, 1989)
- Heroines, Anthology of Australian Women Writers; with articles by Ruby Langford Ginibi, Eva Johnson and Diane Bell (Penguin, 1991). Editor.
- The Diary of Elizabeth Pepys (Grafton, 1991). A spoof of Samuel Pepys' excesses from his wife's imagined diary
- Living by the Pen: Early British Women Writers (Teachers College Press, 1992). Editor.
- The Knowledge Explosion: Generations of Feminist Scholarship (Teachers College Press, 1992). Co-editor with Cheris Kramarae.
- Weddings and Wives (Penguin, 1994). Editor.
- Nattering on the Net: Women, Power and Cyberspace (Spinifex Press, 1995)
- Routledge International Encyclopedia of Women: Global Women's Issues and Knowledge. 4 volumes. General editors: Cheris Kramarae & Dale Spender, 800 contributors (Routledge, 2000). Translated into Spanish and Mandarin.

== Speeches ==
- "Reclaiming Feminism: EnGendering Change: Is there an app for where we're at?" Opening address at the Association of Women Educators biennial conference 2014, published online by Social Change Agency, as "A brilliant introduction to feminism in Australia and a call for coding the new revolution"
- "Building up or dumbing down?" A Keynote Address to the Communities Networking/Networking Communities Conference, 17 February 1998, considers whether the new information medium, particularly the Internet, is a good or bad thing for humanity.
