= List of Landor's Imaginary Conversations =

This is a list of the Imaginary Conversations of Walter Savage Landor, a series of dialogues of historical and mythical characters. It follows the retrospective order and arrangement of the five-volume collection, chosen by Landor himself and to be found in his Collected Works. These were then published separately (1883).

The original spelling and use of honorifics and titles is retained, but some names are made fuller in order to disambiguate.

== First Series: Classical Dialogues ==
=== Greek ===
1. Achilles and Helen of Troy
2. Aesop and Rhodopè (two)
3. Solon and Pisistratus
4. Anacreon and Polycrates
5. Xerxes and Artabanus
6. Pericles and Sophocles
7. Diogenes and Plato
8. Xenophon and Cyrus the Younger
9. Alcibiades and Xenophon
10. Demosthenes and Eubulides (two)
11. Aeschines and Phocion
12. Alexander and the Priest of Hammon
13. Aristoteles and Callisthenes
14. Epicurus, Leontion, and Ternissa
15. Epicurus and Metrodorus
16. Menander and Epicurus (two)
17. Lucian and Timotheus

=== Roman ===
1. Marcellus and Hannibal
2. P. Scipio Aemilianus, Polybius, Panaetius
3. Metellus and Marius
4. Lucullus and Caesar
5. Marcus Tullius Cicero and Quinctus Cicero
6. Tibullus and Messala
7. Tiberius and Vipsania
8. Epictetus and Seneca
9. Virgilius and Horatius
10. Asinius Pollio and Licinius Calvus

== Second Series: Dialogues of Sovereigns and Statesmen ==
1. Richard I and the Abbot of Boxley
2. Henry IV and Sir Arnold Savage
3. Oliver Cromwell and Walter Noble
4. James I and Isaac Casaubon
5. Peter Leopold and President Du Paty
6. Kosciusko and Poniatowski
7. Wolfgang and Henry of Melctal
8. George Washington and Benjamin Franklin
9. Andrew Hofer, Count Metternich, and the Emperor Francis
10. Lord Chesterfield and Lord Chatham
11. Romilly and Perceval
12. Peter the Great and Alexis
13. Louis XIV and Father La Chaise
14. Soliman and Mufti
15. Mr. Pitt and Mr. Canning
16. Archbishop Boulter and Philip Savage
17. Mahomet and Sergius
18. Fra Filippo Lippi and Pope Eugenius IV
19. William Wallace and Edward I
20. William Penn and Lord Peterborough
21. Nicolas and Michel
22. The Duke of Wellington and Sir Robert Inglis
23. Bishop Shipley and Benjamin Franklin
24. Windham and Sheridan
25. Louis XVIII and Talleyrand
26. Romilly and Wilberforce
27. Oliver Cromwell and Sir Oliver Cromwell
28. Admiral Blake and Humphrey Blake

== Third Series: Dialogues of Literary Men ==
1. Lord Brooke and Sir Philip Sidney
2. Robert Southey and Porson (two)
3. Bishop Burnet and Humphrey Hardcastle
4. Abbé Jacques Delille and Walter Landor
5. Middleton and Magliabechi
6. John Milton and Andrew Marvel
7. Lord Bacon and Richard Hooker
8. Samuel Johnson and John Horne Tooke (two)
9. David Hume and John Home
10. Alfieri and Salomon the Florentine Jew
11. Rousseau and Malesherbes
12. Joseph Scaliger and Montaigne
13. Boccaccio and Petrarca
14. Chaucer, Boccaccio and Petrarca
15. Isaac Barrow and Isaac Newton
16. Isaak Walton, Charles Cotton and William Oldways
17. Machiavelli and Michel-Angelo Buonarroti

== Fourth Series ==
=== Dialogues of Literary Men (continued) ===
18. Robert Southey and Walter Landor (two)
19. Andrew Marvell and Bishop Parker
20. Steele and Addison
21. La Fontaine and De La Rochefoucauld
22. Melanchthon and Calvin
23. Galileo, John Milton and a Dominican
24. Essex and Edmund Spenser
25. Archdeacon Hare and Walter Landor
26. Alfieri and Metastasio
27. Machiavelli and Guicciardini
28. John Milton and Andrew Marvel (two)
29. Martin and Jack
30. Tiziano Vecelli and Luigi Cornaro.

=== Dialogues of Famous Women ===
1. Queen Elizabeth and Cecil
2. Roger Ascham and Lady Jane Grey
3. Henry VIII and Anne Boleyn
4. Beniowski and Aphanasia
5. Bossuet and the Duchess of Fontanges
6. John of Gaunt and Joan of Kent
7. The Lady Lisle and Elizabeth Gaunt
8. The Empress Catherine and Princess Dashkof
9. Leofric and Godiva
10. The Maid of Orleans and Agnes Sorel
11. Rhadamistus and Zenobia
12. Tancredi and Constantia
13. Princess Mary and Princess Elizabeth
14. Philip II and Donna Juana Coello
15. Dante and Beatrice
16. Queen Elizabeth, Cecil, Duke of Anjou, and De La Motte Fénélon
17. Mary and Bothwell
18. Tasso and Cornelia
19. Vittoria Colonna and Michel-Angelo Buonarroti
20. The Count Gleichem; the Countess; their children; and Zaida
21. Dante and Gemma Donati
22. Leonora di Este and Father Panigarola

=== Miscellaneous Dialogues ===
1. Marchese Pallavicini and Walter Landor
2. General Kleber and French officers
3. The Emperor Alexander and Capo D'Istria
4. Bonaparte and the President of the Senate
5. General Lascy and the Curate Merino
6. Cavaliere Puntomichino and Mr. Denis Eusebius Talcranagh
7. Prince Maurocordato and General Colocotroni
8. Lopez Baños and Romero Alpuente
9. Don Victor Saez and El Rey Netto
10. Lord Coleraine, Rev. Mr. Bloombury, and Rev. Mr. Swan

== Fifth Series: Miscellaneous Dialogues (concluded) ==
11. Duke de Richelieu, Sir Firebrace Cotes, Lady Glengrin. and Mr. Normanby
12. Florentine, English Visitor, and Landor
13. Pope Leo XII and his valet Gigi
14. M. Villele and M. Corbiere
15. Odysseus, Tersitza, Acrive, and Trelawny
16. Don Ferdinand and Don John-Mary-Luis
17. King of the Sandwich Isles, Mr. Peel, Mr. Croker, and Interpreter
18. King of Ava and Rao-Gong-Fao
19. Photo Zavellas and Kaido
20. Miguel and his mother
21. Sandt and Kotzebue
22. The Cardinal-Legate Albani and picture-dealers
23. Blucher and Sandt
24. Eldon and Encombe (courtesy title)
25. Queen Pomare, Pritchard, Captains Polverel and Des Mitrailles, Lieutenant Poignaunez, Mariners
26. Walker, Hattaji, Gonda, and Dewah
27. Talleyrand and Archbishop of Paris
28. Marshal Bugeaud and Arab chieftain
29. Emperor of China and Tsing-Ti
30. Louis Philippe and M. Guizot
31. M. Thiers and M. Lamartine
32. Nicholas, Frederic-William, and Nesselrode
33. Beranger and La Roche-Jaquelin
34. Nicholas and Nesselrode
35. King Carlo-Alberto and Princess Belgioioso
36. Garibaldi and Mazzini
37. Cardinal Antonelli and General Gemeau
38. Louis Bonaparte and Count Molé
39. Pope Pio Nono and Cardinal Antonelli
40. Archbishop of Florence and Francesco Madiai
