= Murtadi bin al-'Afif =

Egyptian folkorist (c.1154 - 1237)

Murtadi bin al-'Afif bin Hatim bin Muslim al-Maqdisi al-Safi'i, known as Murtadi bin al-'Afif (c.1154–25 June 1237), was an Egyptian Islamic scholar who is known for a collection of folklore.

He was born into a family originally from Jerusalem, hence his nisba "al-Maqdisi." His father served as imam at the al-Andalus palace in Cairo's City of the Dead. Murtadi studied under Abu Tahir al-Silafi and other masters in Alexandria, Damascus, and Cairo. A list of his masters and pupils is included in Rāġib, 1974. Murtadi died on 25 June 1237, near the gate of Bab Zuwayla.

A manuscript of his book of Egyptian tales was found in the Bibliothèque Mazarin by the polymath Pierre Vattier, who translated it into French in 1666 as L'Égypte de Murtadi fils de Gaphiphe. That translation was rendered into English in 1672 by John Davies under the title The Prodigies of Egypt. The original Mazarin manuscript has been lost.

Murtadi names himself twice in his book, and claims the influence of the teachings of Abu Tahir al-Silafi. For many years, there was dispute over the dating of the manuscript, with some placing it at the beginning of the 13th century and others claiming an earlier date of composition for it. These issues were resolved when renewed research found mentions of Murtadi in Al-Mundhiri, who cites him as a teacher, and in other Arabic writings, contemporary and later.

According to biographer John Forster, Walter Savage Landor credited The History of Charoba Queen of Ægypt, an adaptation from Vattier's translation of Murtadi that Clara Reeve appended to the end of her Progress of Romance, as having "arrested his fancy, and yielded him the germ" of his epic poem Gebir (1798).

Murtadi also influenced Gérard de Nerval, who was highly interested in hermetic philosophy. Nerval's Voyage en Orient ("Journey to the Orient," not to be confused by the book of the same title by Lamartine) includes a story about the spirit guardians of the pyramids, which is attributed by the speaker to "an old Arab" he met, but is in actuality taken from Murtadi.
