= Jacques Delille =

French Poet

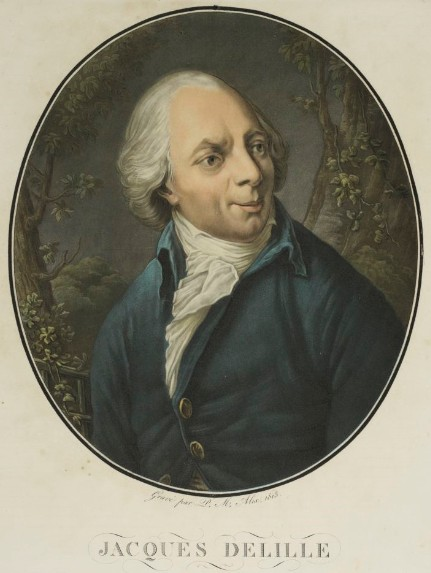
A print by Pierre-Michel Alix after a portrait of the poet (1802)

Jacques Delille (French: [dəlil]; 22 June 1738 at Aigueperse in Auvergne – 1 May 1813, in Paris) was a French poet who came to national prominence with his translation of Virgil's Georgics and made an international reputation with his didactic poem on gardening. He barely survived the slaughter of the French Revolution and lived for some years outside France, including three years in England. The poems on abstract themes that he published after his return were less well received.

== Biography ==
Delille was an illegitimate child, descended on his mother's side from Michel de l'Hôpital. He was educated at the College of Lisieux in Paris and became an elementary school teacher. He had gradually acquired a reputation as a poet by the publication of some minor works by the time his translation of the Georgics of Virgil in 1769 made him famous. When Voltaire recommended Delille for the next vacant place in the Académie française, he was at once elected a member, but he was not admitted until 1774 owing to the opposition of the king, who alleged that he was too young.

In his work on gardens and their landscaping, Jardins, ou l'art d'embellir les paysages (1782), he made good his pretensions as an original poet. In 1786 Delille made a journey to Constantinople in the train of the ambassador M. de Choiseul-Gouffier. He had become professor of Latin poetry at the Collège de France, and was given the secular title of Abbé de Saint-Sévrin, when the outbreak of the French Revolution reduced him to poverty. He purchased his personal safety by professing his adherence to revolutionary doctrine, but eventually quit Paris and retired to his wife's birthplace at Saint-Dié-des-Vosges, where he worked on his translation of the Aeneid.

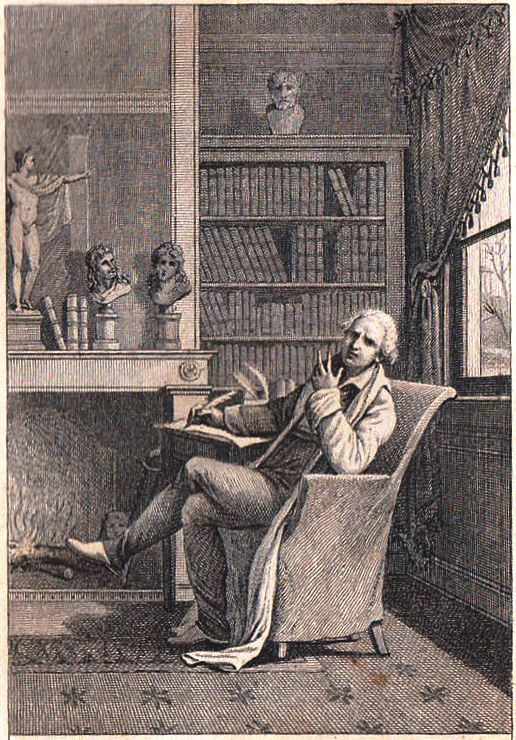
A title page illustration of the poet composing in retirement

In 1794 Delille emigrated first to Basel and then to Glairesse in Switzerland. Here he finished his Homme des champs, and his poem on the Trois règnes de la nature. His next place of refuge was in Germany, where he composed his La Pitié; and finally he passed some time in London (1799–1802), chiefly employed in translating Paradise Lost. There he was under the patronage of Georgiana Cavendish, Duchess of Devonshire, whose descriptive poem The Passage of the Mountain of Saint Gothard was published in Delille's translation in 1802, the year he returned to France.

Once he was settled in Paris again, Delille resumed his professorship and his chair at the Académie française, but lived largely in retirement since he was nearly blind by now. In the years that remained, he published the poems and translations on which he had been working during his exile, as well as some later works, but none of them were so admired as his earlier poems. Following his death, Delille lay in state crowned with a laurel wreath in the Collège de France, where he was drawn by Anne-Louis Girodet de Roussy-Trioson. He was granted an impressive funeral procession and entombed in Père-Lachaise Cemetery, where the Bonapartist politician, Count Regnaud de Saint-Jean d'Angély, spoke his eulogy.

In 1814 a monument was erected in memory of "Virgil Delille" in the Arlesheim Hermitage, the English landscape garden in Switzerland inspired by his work. In 1817 his collected works began to be published as a set and in 1821 Louis-Michel Petit designed a portrait head of the poet for the Great Frenchmen series of bronze medals.

== Poetry ==
=== Epistles and Georgics ===
Delille began his poetic career over the years 1761–74 with a series of thoughtful verse epistles full of up-to-date allusions (later gathered together in his Poésies fugitives). Among these, his Épître sur les Voyages (1765) gained the verse prize of the Académie de Marseille. Once his work became known in England, its ultimate parentage was welcomed. "No poetry in a foreign language approaches the compositions of Mr Pope so much as that of the Abbé Delille, who has confessedly made the English bard his model," asserted the reviewer of the Monthly Review. And certainly among his verse translations were to be found Pope's Epistle to Dr Arbuthnot and Essay on Man.

Another Augustan stylistic habit that appeared early in Delille's epistles was the elegant use of periphrasis to clothe pedestrian terms in poetical phraseology. Speaking of the use to which various metals are put, for example, Delille hides mention of axe and the plough as

The steel that overthrows the oak and fir,
The iron to fertilise the cereal earth,

in his Epître à M.Laurent (1761). In the long run his use of this rhetorical device was so habitual as to become notorious. In a late panegyric to coffee – "To Virgil unfurnished, adored by Voltaire" – Delille had substituted for the word 'sugar' the elaborate paraphrase le miel américain, Que du suc des roseaux exprima l'Africain (that American honey pressed by Africans from the cane's sap), there being no suitable Virgilian formula to cover such a novelty. The passage was later singled out as a cautionary example by French critics and English alike.

Virgil above all remained Delille's poetic model throughout his career, to such an extent, according to one critic, that "sometimes the relationship was even pushed towards self-identification". So it would seem from the fact that after his translation of the Georgics in 1769, and the stout defence of the work's relevance and usefulness in his preliminary essay, Delille went on to supplement Virgil's advice with his own practical work on gardens (Les jardins, 1780). Two decades later he elaborated his thoughts on the moral worth and self-improvement that involvement with the countryside brings in French georgics of his own, L'Homme des champs, ou les Géorgiques françaises (1800). Though there had been earlier translations of Virgil's poem in both verse and prose, what Delille brought to it was the finished quality of his alexandrines wedded to a search for equivalence of effect in the source language that sometimes sacrificed literal accuracy to it.

=== Embellishing the landscape ===
Whereas the subject of the Georgics is set in the fields, Delille changed the focus of Les Jardins ou l'art d'embellir les paysages to the landscaping of enclosed grounds and care for what is grown there. The subject was not touched on by Virgil, but there was already a Virgilian model in the Latin of the French Jesuit René Rapin's four-canto Hortorum Libri IV (1665). Indeed, Delille had mentioned Rapin with no great respect in his preface and immediately brought down on himself a systematic comparison of both works to set the record straight. At the very end of that appeared a satirical verse dialogue between cabbage and turnip (Le Chou et le Navet), anonymous there but known to have been written by Antoine de Rivarol. There the humble products of the vegetable garden protest their displacement by Delille's aristocratic taste for the ornamental and exotic:

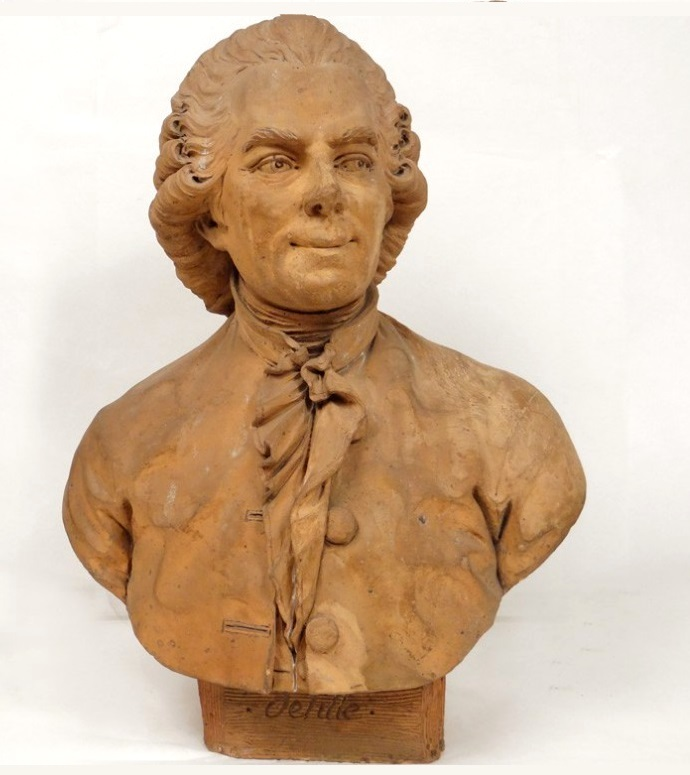
An 18th-century bust of the academician

The elegant Abbé turns a bit red in the face
At the mere thought that in his verse’s urbanity
Cabbage and turnip should ever merit a place.

Delille's work was an early and influential call for rejection of the symmetry and regularity of the formal French style of gardening in favour of the irregular and "natural" English garden. For the next half century, his poem was to become the major reference on the subject. Notable gardeners in France and beyond profited from his advice, described their own creative landscaping to him or invited Delille to see their work for himself. Profiting from this, he had added over a thousand lines more to the poem by the time of his 1801 edition, increasing its length by a third. And there were many translations of the poem: into Polish (1783); three into Italian (1792, 1794, 1808); into German (1796); into Portuguese (1800); and three into Russian (1804, 1814, 1816).

In England there were four translations of the successive French editions. The first was an anonymous version of the first canto, published in 1783, the year following the French poem's appearance. Titled simply On Gardening, it was briefly noticed in the Monthly Review, where the French original was described as "a didactic poem of great merit [that] may be regarded as a formidable rival to Mr Mason's English Garden", the complete edition of which had only recently appeared. An anonymous translation of the whole work followed in 1789, dismissed this time by the Monthly Review as a pretty patchwork of episodes lacking unity. But by 1799, after a new translation by Maria Henrietta Montolieu, critical opinion had veered once more and Delille's ideas were now greeted far more favourably. In the revolutionary exile, there was recognised the friend of English taste. Sufficiently encouraged by its reception, Mrs Montholieu followed Delille's expansion of the poem in 1801 with an augmented version of her own in 1805.

=== A celebration of nature ===
In 1800 Delille published yet another Virgilian improvisation in his French Georgics, L'Homme des champs, ou les Géorgiques françaises. Descriptive rather than didactic, the poem is a celebration of nature that recommends development of the estate by the introduction of foreign and exotic species and living in the country as the route to self-improvement. In welcoming its appearance, the Monthly Review reported that 30,000 copies had been sold in the first fortnight. It also noted the presence in the first canto of "sixty verses borrowed from different English poets; but more in imitation than in close translation." The article quoted copious extracts from the poem, both in the original French and in the reviewer's own translation, rendering Delille's L'Homme des Champs as "The Country Gentleman". But then in the following year, John Maunde published a complete translation of the work under the title The Rural Philosopher, or French Georgics, which also received flattering reviews.

Delille's work inspired various other poetical responses too. fr:Joseph Berchoux published the four cantos of his light-hearted and popular Gastronomie ou l’homme des champs à table (The Country Gentleman at Table) as a sort of didactic pendant in 1801. It was followed by further Georgiques francaises in twelve cantos by the agronomist fr:Jean-Baptiste Rougier de La Bergerie (1804), recommending agriculture to the troops returning from the wars. There were also two further translations of Delille's poem: Willem Bilderdijk's into Dutch (Het Buitenleven, 1803); and Fr J-B.P. Dubois' into Latin as Ruricolae seu Ad Gallos Georgicon (1808).

=== Later works ===
During the years of his exile, Dellile had been hard at work on most of the works issued regularly after his return from exile. The first of these was La Pitié, the text of which illustrates the political caution he now had to exercise. By way of historical illustration of his theme, he had expressed royalist sentiments and criticised the new French regime in the original version that was published after his departure from London. For the Paris edition that soon followed his return, however, Delille found it necessary to rewrite some passages, with the result that, in the view of a later critic, the two different editions published in 1802 were "like the statue with two faces…quite a different thing, according to the side of the channel on which it was contemplated". But for all its author's circumspection, the poem soon became a critical (and political) target.

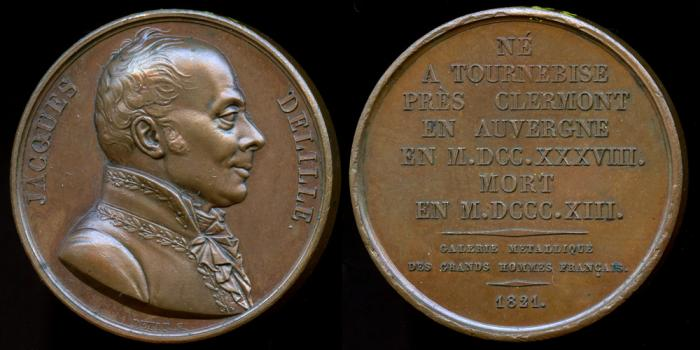
An 1821 medal commemorating Jacques Delille

The ambitious natural history lessons in Les Trois Règnes de la Nature (1808) also left English reviewers sceptical. The Monthly Review found it lacking in organisation, invention, and sometimes even sense. The Edinburgh Review dismissed the poet as "a hackneyed mechanist of verses" and found in his 'Three Kingdoms of Nature' only "a curious medley of plagiarisms" in a work reminiscent of nothing so much as the popularised science in Erasmus Darwin’s The Loves of the Plants. For the reviewer there, everything that Delille had published since 1800 was unsatisfactory.

After the change of taste for his kind of writing soon after his death, English criticism was increasingly dismissive of Delille. In dedicating a section to the poet in his Imaginary Conversations (1824), Walter Savage Landor presented him as "the happiest of creatures, when he could weep over the charms of innocence and the country in some crowded and fashionable circle at Paris". During the course of the unequal dialogue that follows, Delille's part is reduced to defending artificiality and redundancy in French verse over the best practice in other literatures. Later, the article on him in the Encyclopædia Britannica concluded that Delille had attempted more than he could accomplish after his promising beginning; and that, "with all his beauty of versification and occasional felicity of expression, he yet shows, in his later works especially, a great ignorance of the line of distinction between prose and poetry."

== Principal works ==
- Les Géorgiques de Virgile, traduites en vers français (Paris, 1769, 1782, 1785, 1809)
- Les Jardins, en quatre chants (1780; new edition, Paris, 1801)
- L'Homme des champs, ou les Géorgiques françaises (Strasbourg, 1800; 1805 corrected with additions)
- Poésies fugitives (1802)
- Dithyrambe sur l'immortalité de l'âme, suivi du passage du Saint Gothard, poème traduit de l'anglais (1802)
- La Pitié, poeme en quatre chants (Paris, 1803)
- L'Énéide, traduite en vers français (dual language in 4 vols., 1804)
- Le Paradis perdu (dual language in 3 vols., 1805)
- L'Imagination, poème en huit chants (2 vols., 1806)
- Les trois règnes de la nature (2 vols., 1808)
- La Conversation (1812)
