= Gebir (poem) =

1798 poem by Walter Savage Landor

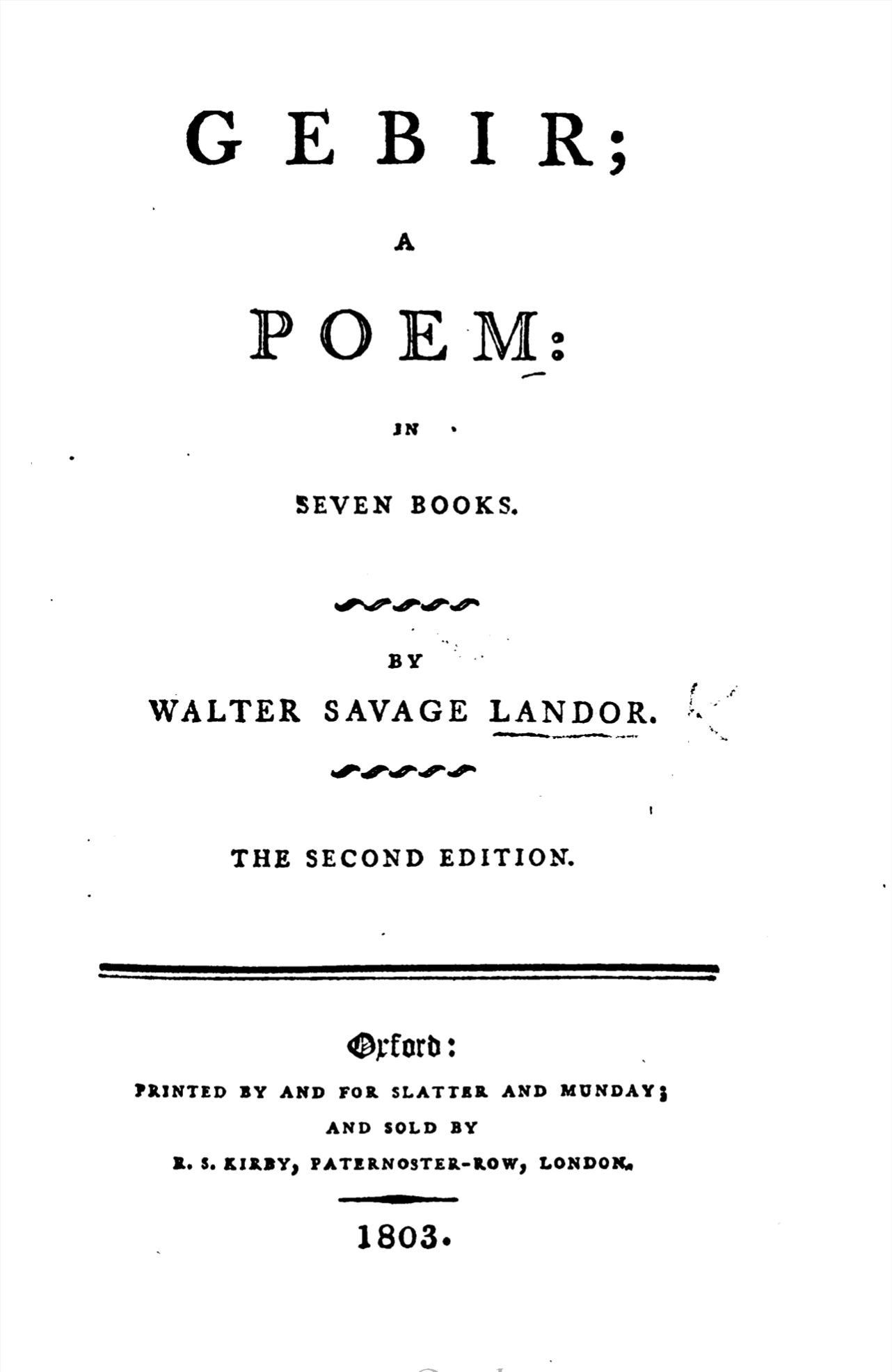
Title page of the 1803 Gebir (Second Edition)

Gebir is a long poem by the English writer Walter Savage Landor. The poem was first published anonymously in English in July 1798, before being revised and republished in 1803, in dual, separate Latin and English editions.

The main subject matter of the poem concerns an Iberian ruler named Gebir, who invades Egypt, where he falls in love with its Queen Charoba. Her attendant Dalica eventually poisons him and he dies. A subplot concerns the romantic alliance of Gebir's brother, a shepherd named Tamar, with a nymph. The poem has been noted for being one of the first works of the Romantic period with an Orientalist theme.

== Inspiration and composition ==
When he was twenty-two years old, Landor was living in South Wales. In the latter part of 1796, his friend Rose Aylmer loaned him a copy of The Progress of Romance (1785) by Clara Reeve, which Aylmer had gotten from the Swansea Circulating Library. This book included "The History of Charoba, Queen of Ægypt," a tale taken from a seventeenth century French translation of an Arabic book by Murtada bin al-'Afif. Reading this text provided Landor with the characters and the situational outline for Gebir, and he probably worked on the poem initially from 1796–1797. After having written a portion of the poem, Landor inadvertently left the manuscript behind in North Wales "on returning from a grouse-shooting expedition on the moors above Bala—where he was possibly a guest of the Price family at Rhiwlas—and 'many months' elapsed before it was forwarded to him at Swansea”. This circumstance of the poem's composition is referenced in Landor's 1854 poem "Apology for Gebir".

Years later, writing in a letter to Lady Blessington, Landor recollected the days of Gebir's composition in the following way:

Never were my spirits better than in my twentieth year, when I wrote Gebir, and did not exchange twelve sentences with men. I lived among woods, which are now killed with copper works, and I took my walk over sandy sea-coast deserts, then covered with low roses and thousands of nameless flowers and plants, trodden by the naked feet of the Welsh peasantry, and trackless. These creatures were somewhat between me and the animals, and were as useful to the landscape as masses of weed or stranded boats.

Several lines in the poem reference and reflect Landor's hopes that the leadership of Napoleon Bonaparte would bring about a greater equality (Book 6, 191-3; Book 307-8). These lines were qualified by a note in the 1803 edition, expressing disappointment that these hopes had not been fulfilled.

According to Landor, parts of Gebir were first composed in Latin, others first in English. The Latin version would not be published until 1803, five years after the first edition. This Latin version (Gebirus) Landor finalized during a trip to France in the summer of 1802.

== Style and structure ==
Gebir is divided into seven books. The poetic style is blank verse. By way of explanation, Landor stated, “there never was a poem in rhyme that grew not tedious in a thousand lines.” He cited Pindar and Milton as influences. “The style of Gebir is severe because when I composed it I was fresh from repeated perusals of Pindar." Although the poem's overall mode is Hellenistic and epical-heroic, it also blends elements of pastoral, romance, and tragedy.

== Publication history ==
The first English version of Gebir was anonymously published in July or August 1798. The printer for this edition was Henry Sharpe of Warwick, although the title page bore the imprint of Rivingtons. Landor had first submitted the manuscript to Cadell & Davies of London who had published his first book The Poems of Walter Savage Landor (1795), but they declined Gebir. As published in 1798, the text was plagued by a number of errors, mostly arising from Landor’s own messy and numerous corrections to the manuscript and his residing at a distance of sixteen miles from the printer's offices. The poem was paperbound and sold for either 1 or 2 shillings.

An important related work was printed around 1800, although not published until 1802. This was Poetry by the Author of Gebir: and A Postscript To that Poem, with Remarks on Some Critics. The main contents of this book were the two blank verse epic poems "The Story of Crysaor" and "From The Phocæans" and "Protis's Narrative", each in a blank verse epic style much like the style of Gebir. In the "Postscript to Gebir", Landor acknowledged and replied to Gifford's and Southey's reviews of Gebir that appeared in late 1799 and early 1800. The postscript also gave an account of the book's very limited distribution:

Far from soliciting the attention of those who are passing by, Gebir is confined, I believe, to the shop of one bookseller, and I never heard that he had even made his appearance at the window. I understand not the management of these matters, but I find that the writing of a book is the least that an author has to do. My experience has not been great; and the caution which it has taught me lies entirely on the other side of publication.

Likely around 1802, partly to address the errors in the first edition of the text, Landor undertook to have the poem republished. Relying on his brother Robert to assist in preparing the text, Landor had the text published in its revised form by Slatter & Munday of London in January or February 1803. It was probably Robert who hired a Christ Church scholar named Dovaston to correct the text at a rate of £2 per sheet. Revisions to the text of 1798 included the addition of 43 lines (1,881 lines in the 1803 version, compared to 1,838 lines in the 1798 version). Landor also added "Arguments" offering a brief synopsis of the story at the beginning of each book, as well as explanatory footnotes, glossing the text's obscure passages. The book was announced in the Monthly Epitome for February 1803 at a price of 4 shillings in boards. In late November of the same year was published in identical format the Latin version, Gebirus, Poema, with the Latinized name "Savagius Landor" appearing on the title page.

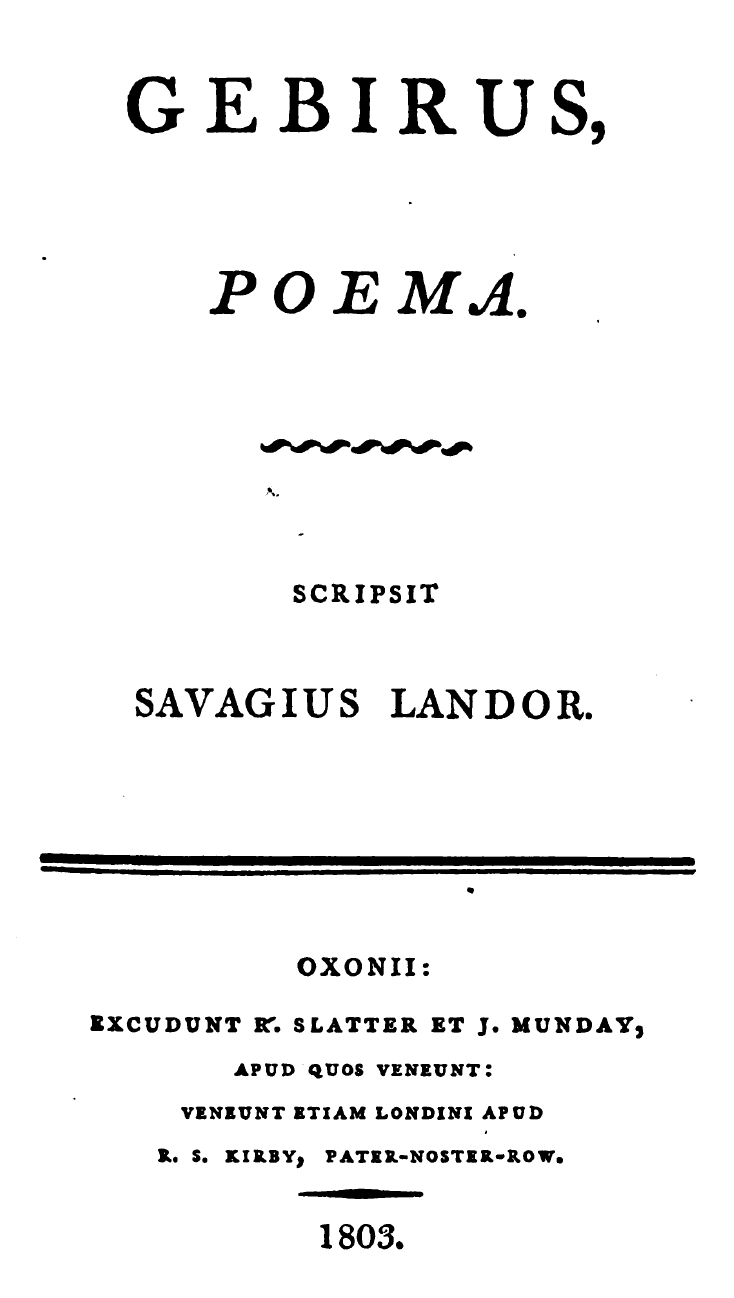
Title page of 'Gebirus, Poema' by Walter Savage Landor

The next publication of the poem was in 1831, in the volume of Gebir, Count Julian, and Other Poems. Landor once again revised the text, starting with the excision of the first eleven lines from Book One.

The poem was republished a few times toward the end of Landor's lifetime in various collections.

The poem can be found in volume one of Stephen Wheeler's The Poetical Works of Walter Savage Landor (1937), with variants between editions noted, and some commentary.

== Reception and influence ==
The first to review Gebir was the young poet Robert Southey, who was given the book to review by the editor of The Critical Review. His enthusiastic review appeared in September 1799, and included ample quotation from the poem. “We have read his poem repeatedly with more than common attention, and with far more than common delight,” Southey wrote. He also wrote enthusiastically to friends of the poem, stating that it contained "some of the most exquisite poetry in the language"; that "its intelligible passages are flashes of lightning at midnight"; that "There is a poem called Gebir, written by God knows whom, sold for a shilling: it has miraculous beauties." He would later cite Gebir as a strong influence on his own long poem Thalaba the Destroyer: "I am sensible of having derived great improvement from the frequent perusal of Gebir at that time."

The poem received an approving but brief notice in The Gentleman's Magazine of London in its supplement for 1799 and referred to it as a poem "of little price, but great merit". However, William Gifford, writing in The Monthly Review a few months later in February 1800, pronounced the poem “a jumble of incomprehensible trash... the most vile and despicable effusion of a mad and muddy brain that ever disgraced, I will not say the press, but the ‘darkened walls’ of Bedlam.”

One enthusiastic reader of the poem in its 1803 edition was Thomas De Quincey. Many years later, in an article on Landor for Tait's Edinburgh Magazine published in January 1847 ("Notes on Walter Savage Landor"), De Quincey recalled finding Gebir in a bookshop in December 1803 and being "astonished... by the splendour of its descriptions". Unaware of Southey's enthusiastic praise of the poem, he wrote that he imagined himself as "the one sole purchaser and reader of the poem".

Another fascinated reader of the poem was Percy Bysshe Shelley. Thomas Jefferson Hogg related that he had visited Shelley at University College but found him so engrossed in Gebir that he could not draw his attention away from it. He flung the book out the window, whereupon it was brought back by a servant and Shelley engrossed once again.

Charles Lamb was less enthusiastic. In a letter to Southey, he wrote, “I have seen Gebor! Gebor aptly so denominated from Geborish, quasi Gibberish. But Gebor hath some lucid intervals. I remember darkly one beautiful simile veiled in uncouth phrases about the youngest daughter of the Ark.”

== Notable editions ==
- Gebir (July or August 1798; anonymously published)
- Gebir; A Poem: In Seven Parts (January or February 1803)
- Gebirus: Poema (November 1803; in Latin)
- Gebir, Count Julian, and Other Poems (1831)
- The Poetical Works of Walter Savage Landor, vol. 1. Ed. Stephen Wheeler. Oxford: Clarendon Press, 1937.

== Selected criticism ==
- Bainbridge, Simon. Napoleon and English Romanticism. Cambridge: Cambridge UP, 1995. pp. 30–49.
- Bradley, William. The Early Poems of Walter Savage Landor. London: Bradbury, Agnew, & Co, Ltd, 1913.
- Bush, Douglas. Mythology And The Romantic Tradition In English Poetry. Cambridge: Harvard UP, 1937. pp. 236–240.
- Elwin, Malcolm. Landor: A Replevin. London: Macdonald, 1958.
- Garcia, Humberto. “The Hermetic Tradition of Arabic Islam and the Colonial Politics of Landor’s Gebir.” Studies in Romanticism, Vol. 46, No. 4 (Winter 2007), pp. 433–459.
- Islam, MD Monirul. “A Tale of Three Journeys: Orientalist Poetics/Politics of Landor’s Gebir.” Impressions, Vol. 11, No. 2 (2017).
- Pinsky, Robert. Landor’s Poetry. Chicago: U of Chicago P, 1968.
- Richardson, Alan. "Epic Ambivalence: Imperial Politics and Romantic Deflection in Williams's Peru and Landor's Gebir". Romanticism, Race, and Imperial Culture, 1780-1834. Ed. Alan Richardson and Sonia Hofkosh. Bloomington: Indiana University Press, 1996.
- Roberts, Adam. “Epic.” Landor’s Cleanness. Oxford: Oxford UP, 2014.
- Schlaak, Robert. Entstehungs- u. Textgeschichte von Landors “Gebir”. Halle, 1909.
- Sharafuddin, Mohammed. “Landor’s Gebir and the Establishment of Romantic Orientalism.” Islam and Romantic Orientalism: Literary Encounters with the Orient. London: I.B. Tauris & Co. Ltd., 1994. pp. 1–42.
- Super, R.H. The Publication of Landor’s Works. London: Bibliographical Society, 1954.
- Super, R.H. Walter Savage Landor: A Biography. New York: New York University Press, 1954.
- Tucker, Herbert F. Epic: Britain's Heroic Muse, 1790–1910. Oxford: Oxford UP, 2008. pp. 80–85.
- Vitoux, Pierre. “Gebir as an Heroic Poem.” The Wordsworth Circle, Vol. 7, No. 1 (Winter 1976), pp. 51–57.
- Williams, Stanley T. “The Story of Gebir.” PMLA, Vol. 36, No. 4 (Dec. 1921), pp. 615–631.
