= The Phocæans (poem) =

Epic poem by Walter Savage Landor

The Phocæans is an epic poem in blank verse by Walter Savage Landor, likely composed around 1795, first published in 1802. The subject matter of the poem was suggested by Landor's readings of several passages in the writings of the Latin historian Justin, relating how the Phocaeans were displaced from Ionia in western Anatolia by the invasion of Harpagus and his men, serving under Cyrus the Great. In the poem, the Phocaeans seek aid from the king of Tartessus. A minstrel named Hymneus relates the history of the Tartessians as a moral example, before Protis, the leader of the Phocæans, relates at length their defiance of the Persian king. Incomplete and fragmentary, the poem was to be completed with the settlement of the Phocæans in Gaul, and their foundation of the city of Massalia (today Marseille), with the presence of Celtic influences.

== Composition and publication history ==
Landor likely began work on "The Phocæans" in 1794 or 1795. In a letter to Robert Browning, Landor stated, "At College, I and Stackhouse were examined by the college tutor in Justin, who mentions the expulsion of the Phocæans from their country. In my childish ambition, I fancied I could write an epic on it. Before the year's end I did what you see, and corrected it the year following." Several critics, including William Bradley, believe that "The Phocæans" may have been abandoned in the fall of 1796 when Landor discovered the myth of Gebir and Queen Charoba, and began work on another long epic poem in blank verse, Gebir (1798).

"The Phocæans" was first published in two sections with a brief preface in Landor's Poetry by the Author of Gebir: and A Postscript To that Poem, with Remarks on Some Critics (1802). The volume had been printed in 1800, and withheld from publication for a time due to Landor's need to check a reference. The two long sections from the poem are titled "From The Phocæans" and "Part of Protis's Narrative".

Two additions to the poem, a connecting fragment tying the two long sections together, and a brief, fragmentary "sequel", were found among Landor's personal copies, and were edited by Stephen Wheeler in 1897. In 1933, Wheeler edited "The Phocæans" in a version incorporating the two long sections with the connecting fragment and the sequel for the first volume of Landor's poetic works in three volumes.

== Classical sources ==
The passages in Justin which inspired Landor to begin composing "The Phocæans" are likely Epitome of Pompeius Trogus, 43.3-4. Another classical source that provides information on the Phocaeans is Herodotus, Histories, 1.162-169, although it is not clear if Landor was familiar with this source.

== Reception and criticism ==
As William Bradley states in The Early Poems of Walter Savage Landor, “The Phocæans” represents “a major stage in the development of Landor’s art”, for it is his "first considerable production in blank verse". Like Gebir, the poem proceeds through a density of images and phrasing that at times challenges the reader’s impression of the poem’s coherence, and at other times achieves brilliance.

The poem was not very well received. William Taylor's remark on the loosely associative “flea-skip” tendency of Landor's epic poem Gebir is perhaps the most pertinent, as it was referenced by Robert Southey in his review of “The Phocæans”. Taylor had written, “There are exquisitely fine passages, but they succeed each other by such flea-skips of association that I am unable to track the path of the author's mind, and verily suspect him of insanity.” Southey found the poem’s manner disjointed in the extreme. “Nothing can be imagined more obscure in its arrangement and perplexed in language than these extracts. […] The author has continued to compress and correct till his language becomes like the contractions in old manuscripts, difficult or unintelligible; a kind of short hand which may remind him of his own conceptions, but never can explain them to another.”

The poor reception of Poetry by the Author of Gebir: and A Postscript To that Poem, with Remarks on Some Critics would eventually lead Landor to abandon work on a Latin version of "The Phocæans", presumably around 1803 or 1804. Years later, Landor told Southey that he had burned several hundred verses of a Latin version of “The Phocæans” in the fire.

The poem's most substantial and detailed commentaries have been written by William Bradley and Adam Roberts. Roberts argues that the poem's incompleteness is particularly apt for the subject matter of a people in exile. “[T]he poem’s very incompletion registers its unique force. […] Landor’s Phocæans never arrive at their destination. Instead they exist in a sort of extratemporal stasis that articulates a symbolic suspension of historical change.”

In a far-ranging survey of British epic poetry, Herbert F. Tucker observes that the poem's “inchmeal narrative advance, relieved by moments of descriptive finesse, achieves an unflinching pathos peculiarly suited to his Virgian thematic of evacuation, exile, and endurance.”

== Trivia ==
In his monograph Landor's Cleanness (2014), the critic Adam Roberts states, "It is likely Landor was the first Englishman to write poetry about the Phocæans, and it is almost as likely that he was the last." However, the English barrister, poet, and translator E. H. Pember in 1895 published a collection of verse containing a poem about the Phocaeans (see The Voyage of the Phocæans: And Other Poems, with the Prometheus Bound of Æschylus Done Into English Verse). Pember's "The Voyage of the Phocæans" is structured in three books and fills about 65 pages; it is not clear whether he may have been influenced by Landor's "The Phocæans".

== Selected criticism ==
- Bradley, William. The Early Poems of Walter Savage Landor. London: Bradbury, Agnew, & Co, Ltd, 1913.
- Bush, Douglas. Mythology And The Romantic Tradition In English Poetry. Cambridge: Harvard UP, 1937. pp. 236–240.
- Elwin, Malcolm. Landor: A Replevin. London: Macdonald, 1958.
- Roberts, Adam. “Epic.” Landor’s Cleanness. Oxford: Oxford UP, 2014.
- Super, R.H. The Publication of Landor’s Works. London: Bibliographical Society, 1954.
- Super, R.H. Walter Savage Landor: A Biography. New York: New York University Press, 1954.
