= Henrietta Mosse =

Irish-born British novelist

- Born: Ireland
- Died: 1834; London

Henrietta Mosse or Henrietta Rouviere (17?? – 1834) was a British romantic novelist who was born in Ireland.

== Life ==
Henrietta Rouviere was born in Ireland but the actual location and date is unknown. She was the daughter of Joseph Rouviere, Esquire, of Dublin.

She moved to London with her mother in about 1802 or 1803. Her first novel, Lussington Abbey, was published anonymously in 1804. The following year she married Isaac Mosse, who was about 40 years old, in London. The wedding was on 4 December 1806 in St Marylebone. Her mother died the following year.

Her 1807 novel, A Peep at our Ancestors, is one of her best known. It was a romantic novel set in the 12th century including explanatory footnotes. Mosse complained that this book should have appeared in 1805 and blamed the difficulties of dealing with the publishers from Ireland and the death of her supporter the Duke of Leinster. The novel was said to be based on documents but there seems little evidence of research.

Her book Heirs of Villeroy the year before had good reviews and in 1808 The Old Irish Baronet, or, The Manners of my Country followed. The latter was based on a 1788 gothic story, The Old English Baron, by Clara Reeve.

In 1814 her husband had his book Enclytica, Being the Outlines of a Course of Instruction on the Principles of Universal Grammar published.

In 1822 her husband suffered paralysing strokes. He had lost his money in a swindle a few years before and they now relied on the novels that Mosse published and the patronage of Louisa Gordon, Marchioness Cornwallis. During the 1820s she published four novels. A Father's Love and a Woman's Friendship in 1825, Gratitude and other Tales in 1826, Woman's Wit and Man's Wisdom, or, Intrigue the following year and in 1829 The Blandfords, or, Fate and Fortune.

Her novels were a poor income and she seemed unable to find other writing work. Her husband's single publication enabled her to make appeals to the Royal Literary Fund and they were of assistance to them but the last successful appeal was from the "side of his coffin". She told the fund that she had written plays but she suspected that although she had some encouragement she felt it would need a man to persuade a company to perform them. Her work 'The distress of women was also mentioned in her 1830 appeal to the fund. She published most of her novels at the Minerva Press.

Mosse died in London in poverty in 1834. An appeal on her behalf for funds for her funeral was turned down by the Royal Literary Fund who noted that she was living in "great destitution in a miserable attic".
