= Crysaor (poem) =

Crysaor (also known as The Story of Crysaor, or Chrysaor) is a short epic poem composed in blank verse by Walter Savage Landor, printed in 1800 and first published in 1802. The poem depicts the slaying of the mythological figure Chrysaor by the sea god Neptune and the Nereids, or sea nymphs. In the poem, Chrysaor is described as the sole survivor of "the race of earth-born giants" and as sovereign over Gades (Cádiz).

== Classical sources ==
The story of Chrysaor’s birth is found in two sources from antiquity. These are Pseudo-Apollodorus, The Library, 2.4, and Hesiod, Theogony, 270-305, both of which relate how Chrysaor and Pegasus were born when Perseus beheaded Medusa. Chrysaor is the son of Medusa and Poseidon, or Neptune. Another source (Diodorus Siculus, The Library of History, 4.17.1-3) states that Chrysaor was "king over the whole of Iberia" and that he received his name (meaning "golden sword" in Latin) because of his wealth. The dramatic crux of the poem—the slaying of Chrysaor by Neptune in retaliation for angering Jove—is of Landor’s own invention, and not found in classical mythology.

== Composition and publication history ==
Crysaor was first published in Landor's Poetry by the Author of Gebir: and A Postscript To that Poem, with Remarks on Some Critics (1802). The volume had been printed in 1800, and withheld from publication for a time due to Landor's need to check a reference. Several critics, including William Bradley, believe that Crysaor was begun shortly after Landor had completed work on the first edition of Gebir (1798). The poem consists of 207 lines of blank verse.

== Reception, influence, and criticism ==
Crysaor has left Landor's critics and biographers divided as to whether the poem is one of Landor’s best or worst short poems. Douglas Bush, for instance, finds that “Crysaor with its rugged approaches to sublimity is major poetry”, and that “probably no modern English poem of comparable power is less known to the generality of readers”. Sir Sidney Colvin likewise considered Crysaor to be “Landor's finest piece of narrative writing in blank verse”. Landor's biographer R. H. Super thought Colvin's estimate "hardly justifiable" and found only "the delightful picture of the sea gods and nymphs up to the best of Landor's poetry". Robert Pinsky deemed Crysaor “a poorly written and foolishly conceived poem”, an “inadvertent parody” of Milton”, and “a wretched piece of juvenilia”.

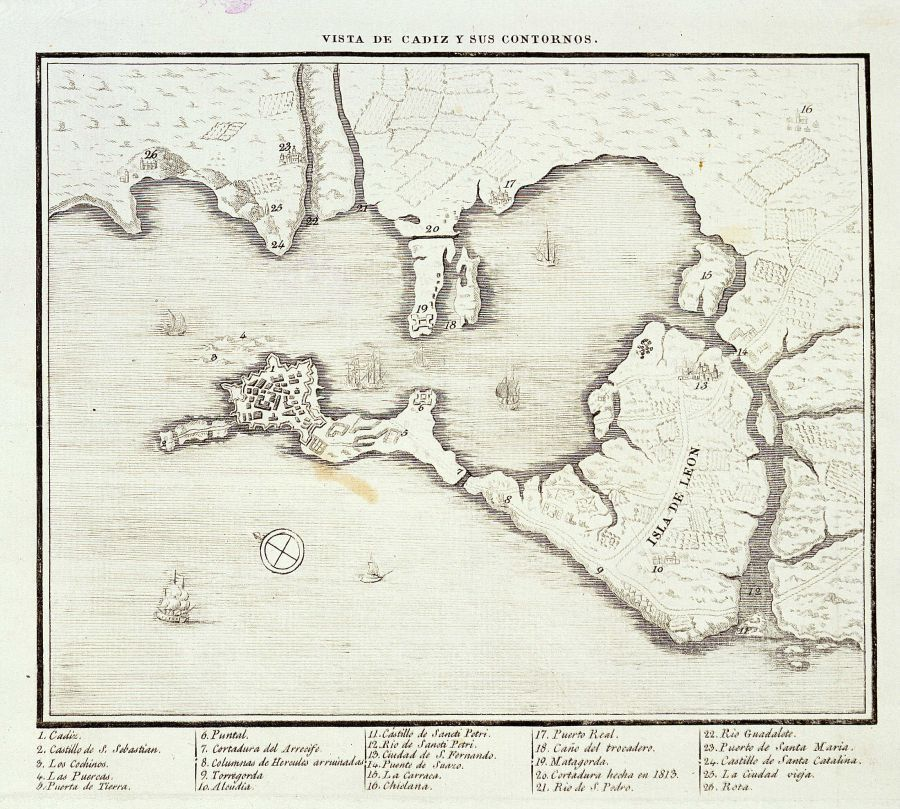
1813 map of the Isla de Léon in Cádiz, in southwest Spain

One important aspect of the poem is its topographical and geographical aspect. The slaying of Chrysaor coincides with him being “sever'd from the fruitful main” (line 10) by the god of the sea. Landor probably had in mind the topographical situation of the Isla de León, which is entirely cut off from mainland Andalusia by the waters of the Caño de Sancti Petri. Advancing this interpretation, Adam Roberts describes Crysaor as “a piece of topographic aetiology”, presenting a mythic origin story for the separation of the Isla de Léon from the rest of Iberia.

A key part of this interpretive framing is found in Landor's lengthy footnote to Crysaor, where he posits that Chrysaor's sin that angered Jove was not just his hubris before the gods, but more specifically his tolerance of and enrichment by the slave trade. Cadíz was, along with Seville, a key hub in the transatlantic slave trade during the development of the Iberian empire, and Landor likely had this geographical history in mind when devising the poem's mythic, topographic framework.

William Bradley noted the presence of strong parallels between Crysaor and Milton's Paradise Lost. The relationship of Milton's God the Father to God the Son is mirrored in the relationship of Landor's Jove to Neptune, with Chrysaor occupying a rebellious role analogous to that of Satan in Milton's epic. The tritons and sea nymphs in Landor's poem would be analogous to the angels in Paradise Lost, helping to defeat the defiant rebel. Bradley also notes the similarity of elements of Crysaor to elements in the story of Ajax's defiance and destruction by Neptune as related in the Odyssey, Book IV, lines 500-511.

== Selected criticism ==
- Bradley, William. The Early Poems of Walter Savage Landor. London: Bradbury, Agnew, & Co, Ltd, 1913.
- Bush, Douglas. Mythology And The Romantic Tradition In English Poetry. Cambridge: Harvard UP, 1937. Pp. 236-240.
- Elwin, Malcolm. Landor: A Replevin. London: Macdonald, 1958.
- Pinsky, Robert. Landor’s Poetry. Chicago: U of Chicago P, 1968.
- Roberts, Adam. Landor’s Cleanness. Oxford: Oxford UP, 2014. Pp. 70-77.
