= The Old English Baron =

1778 novel by Clara Reeve

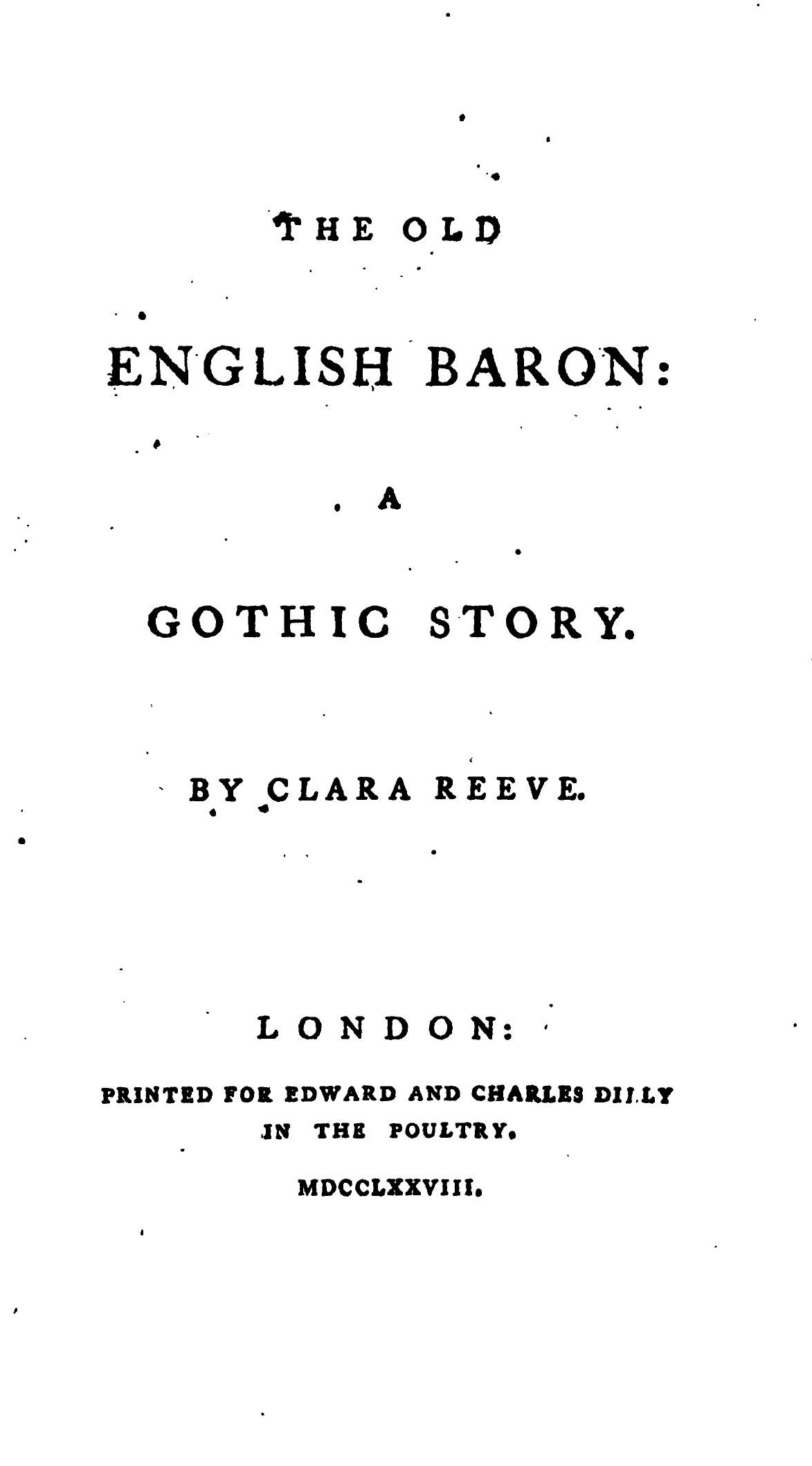
- First edition title page
- Author: Clara Reeve
- Language: English
- Genre: Horror; Mystery; Ghost story
- Published: 31 March 1778
- Publication place: United Kingdom

The Old English Baron is an early Gothic novel by the English author Clara Reeve. It was first published under this title in 1778, although it had anonymously appeared in May 1777 under its original name of The Champion of Virtue, before Samuel Richardson's daughter, Mrs Bridgen, had edited it for her. The revised edition was mostly the same as the original and corrected typographical errors.

== Background ==
Reeve noted in the 1778 preface that

"This Story is the literary offspring of The Castle of Otranto, written upon the same plan, with a design to unite the most attractive and interesting circumstances of the ancient Romance and modern Novel, at the same time it assumes a character and manner of its own, that differs from both; it is distinguished by the appellation of a Gothic Story, being a picture of Gothic times and manners."

In other words, Reeve set out to take Walpole's plot and adapt it to the demands of the time by balancing fantastic elements with 18th-century realism.

== Synopsis ==
The story follows the adventures of Sir Philip Harclay, who returns to medieval England to find that Arthur Lord Lovel, the friend of his youth, is dead. His cousin Walter Lord Lovel had succeeded to the estate, and sold the family castle to the baron, Fitz-Owen. Among the baron's household were his two sons and daughter Emma, several young gentlemen relations being educated with the sons, and Edmund Twyford, the son of a peasant, who had been brought to live with them. When Sir Philip saw him, he took an immediate liking to him, being struck by his resemblance to his lost friend. The Knight proposing to take him into his own family, being childless, Edmund preferred to remain with the baron, receiving however an assurance that if ever he was in need of it, Sir Philip would renew his offer.

The narrative then oversteps the interval of four years. By his manifestly superior nature and qualities Edmund had attracted the enmity of his benefactor's nephews, and the coldness of Sir Robert, the eldest son. William, his younger brother, is his staunch friend however, and Edmund is in love with the Lady Emma.

== Characters ==
- Sir Phillip Harclay, the Champion of Virtue
- Arthur Lord Lovel, his murdered friend
- Walter Lord Lovel, assassin of the above, and usurper of his lands and titles
- Baron Fitz-Owen, the Old English Baron, brother-in-law of the above
- Robert Fitz-Owen, eldest son of the Baron
- William Fitz-Owen, second son of the Baron, ardent friend of Edmund
- Walter Fitz-Owen, youngest son of the Baron
- Emma, daughter of the Baron, in love with Edmund
- Richard Wenlock, base and vile cousin of the young gentlemen, avid enemy of Edmund
- Edmund Lovel alias Seegrave alias Twyford, posthumous son of Arthur Lord Lovel, raised in obscurity, in love with Emma
- Father Oswald, a priest resident at the castle of Lovel, confidante of Edmund
- Joseph, a faithful elderly servant of the Lovels; devoted to his young master
- Andrew Twyford, a peasant farmer
- Margery Twyford, wife of the above, Edmund's foster mother

== Style ==
Originally Reeve presented the story, as Walpole had done before her, as an old manuscript she had merely discovered and transcribed. Under Mrs Bridgen's auspices this fiction was removed from the preface, but more subtle textual references to its authenticity were allowed to remain. These included the claim that the four-year interval was a lacuna in the manuscript, where the original author was supposed to have left off and a "more modern hand" continued the manuscript; there are many subsequent breaches in the narrative where the original was supposed to have been defaced by damp.

== Influence on the Gothic ==
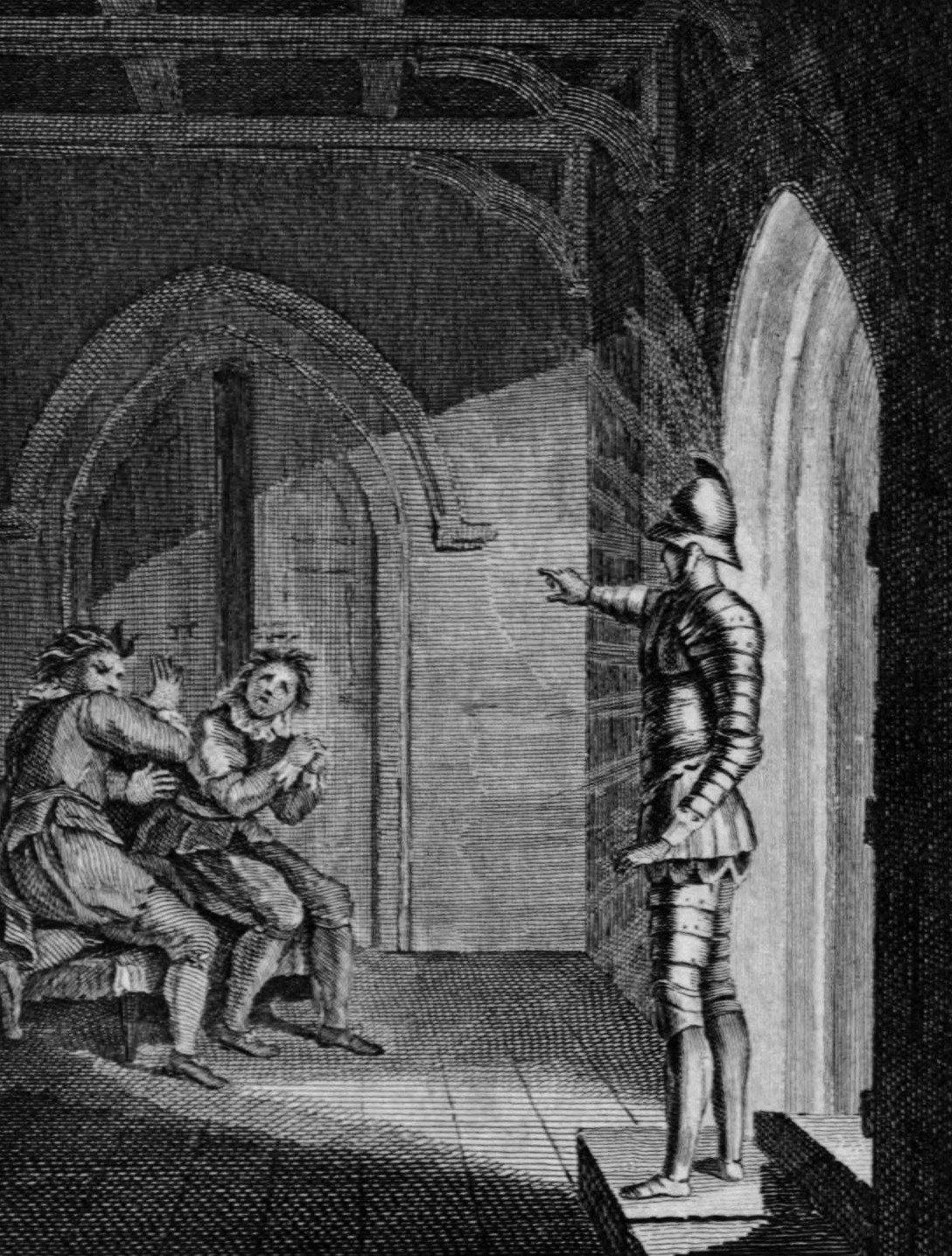
Frontispiece illustration to the 1778 edition

The Old English Baron was a major influence in the development of Gothic fiction. It was dramatized in 1799 as Edmond, Orphan of the Castle. Reeve's contribution in the development of the Gothic fiction can be demonstrated on at least two fronts. In the first, there is the reinforcement of the Gothic narrative framework, one that focuses on expanding the imaginative domain so as to include the supernatural without losing the realism that marks the novel that Walpole pioneered. Secondly, Reeve also sought to contribute to finding the appropriate formula to ensure that the fiction is believable and coherent. The result is that she spurned specific aspects of Walpole's style such as his tendency to incorporate too much humor or comic elements in such a way that it diminishes the Gothic tale's ability to induce fear. In 1777, Reeve enumerated Walpole's excesses in this respect: "...a sword so large as to require an hundred men to lift it; a helmet that by its own weight forces a passage through a court-yard into an arched vault, big enough for a man to go through; a picture that walks out of its frame; a skeleton ghost in a hermit's cowl..."

Reeve declared in her preface her opinion that supernatural tales should be kept within the bounds of reality, contrasting it unfavourably with Otranto. Walpole remarked in response that the Old Baron was "[S]o probable, that any trial for murder at the Old Bailey would make a more interesting story", ridiculing the concept of a probable ghost-story. Although the succession of Gothic writers did not exactly follow Reeve's focus on emotional realism, she was able to posit a framework that keeps Gothic fiction within the realm of the probable. This aspect remains a challenge for authors in this genre after the publication of The Old English Baron. Outside of its providential context, the supernatural would often suffer the risk of veering towards the absurd.
