= Robert Eyres Landor =

Robert Eyres Landor (10 May 1781 – 26 January 1869) was an English writer, dramatist, poet, and Anglican clergyman.

== Life ==
Landor was the third son of Dr Walter Landor, a physician, and his wife Elizabeth Savage, and thereby the brother of Walter Savage Landor. He was born at Warwick and went to Bromsgrove School, then as a scholar, to Worcester College, Oxford in 1797. He became a Fellow of Worcester College and a clergyman. In 1815 Landor went to Italy and met his brother Walter and his wife as they made their temperamental journey through France. He became vicar of Hughenden Buckinghamshire in 1817 until 1825, and was also Chaplain in ordinary to the Prince Regent. He became Rector of Nafford in Birlingham in 1829 and remained there until his death. Birlingham is situated at the foot of the Bredan Hills and within sight of the Malverns. He is noted as never having been absent from Sunday Duty and the church at Birlingham was restored with money left by him.

He was somewhat reluctant to claim credit for his own work. The drama The Count Arezzi of 1824 was at the time attributed to Byron and the story The Fawn of Sertorius (1846) to Walter Savage Landor. He is also said to have tried to destroy copies of the dramas The Earl of Brecon, Faiths Fraud and The Ferryman from 1841.

It was said that he greatly resembled his eldest brother, Walter Savage Landor, in his genius and classical knowledge, but in nothing else. His cousin's daughter Lucy Landor recalled "Once only I recall his visiting my father and he then struck me as the most wonderful and delightful talker I ever heard. He spoke of his early travels in Italy and brought every scene before one. If he 'talked like a book', it was because his language was so beautiful and his descriptions so vivid and striking. His conversation made far more impression on me than did that of [his brother] W.S.L., whose tremendous laughs I recall much better than his saying."

== Works ==
- Guy's Porridge Pot (1808)
- The Count Arezzi (1824)
- The Impious Feast. A Poem in ten books (1828)
- The Earl of Brecon
- Faiths Fraud
- The Ferryman (1841)
- The Fawn of Sertorius (1846)
- The Fountain of Arethusa (1848)
