= Clara Reeve =

English novelist (1729–1807)

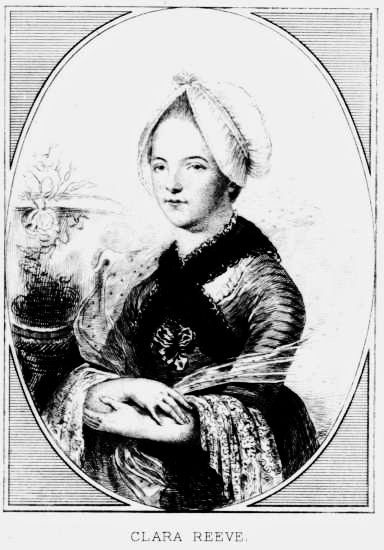
- Portrait of Clara Reeve, c. 1770
- Born: Clara Reeve; 23 January 1729; Ipswich, England
- Died: 3 December 1807 (aged 78); Ipswich, England
- Occupation: Novelist
- Writing career
- Period: 1769–1802
- Notable work: The Old English Baron

Clara Reeve (23 January 1729 – 3 December 1807) was an English novelist best known for the Gothic novel The Old English Baron (1778). She also wrote an innovative history of prose fiction, The Progress of Romance (1785). Her first work was a translation from Latin, at the time a language unusual for a woman to learn. She was a near-contemporary of the bluestockings ladies of Elizabeth Montague's circle.

== Biography ==
=== Early life ===
Clara Reeve was born in Ipswich, one of the eight children of Reverend William Reeve MA, Rector of Freston and of Kirton, Suffolk, and perpetual curate of St Nicholas, Ipswich. Her mother Hannah was the daughter of William Smithies, a goldsmith and jeweller to King George I. Vice-Admiral Samuel Reeve (c. 1733–1803) was her brother.

Reeve described her father and her early life in a letter to a friend:

My father was an old Whig; from him I have learned all that I know; he was my oracle; he used to make me read the Parliamentary debates, while he smoked his pipe after supper. I gaped and yawned over them at the time, but, unawares to myself, they fixed my principles once and for all. He made me read Rapin's History of England; the information it gave made amends for its dryness. I read Cato's Letters by Trenchard and Gordon; I read the Greek and Roman histories, and Plutarch's Lives: all these at an age when few people of either sex can read their names.

=== Career ===
After the death of her father in 1755, Reeve lived for a time with her mother and sisters in Colchester, where her sister Lucia ran a millinery, before moving into her own house in Ipswich. There her first piece of authorship was a translation from Latin of the historical allegory Argenis by John Barclay, which she entitled The Phoenix (1772). She was saddened by the reception her translation received, later writing, "It was the best book I ever gave to the public, and the worst received."

Reeve published at least 24 volumes over a 33-year career as an author. They included five novels, of which only The Champion of Virtue and The Old English Baron (1777) became well known. The latter was written in imitation of The Castle of Otranto or as a rival to it. The two have often been printed together. The first edition, entitled The Old English Baron, was dedicated to the daughter of Samuel Richardson, who is said to have helped Reeve to revise and correct it. It would have a noticeable influence on Mary Shelley's Frankenstein (1818).

Reeve also wrote an epistolary novel, The School for Widows (1791), followed by Plans of Education (1792), whose focus was on issues of female education. Her innovative history of prose fiction, The Progress of Romance (1785), can be seen as a precursor to modern histories of the novel. It specifically upholds the tradition of female literary history heralded by Elizabeth Rowe (1674–1737) and Susannah Dobson (died 1795). One story in the work, "The History of Charoba, Queen of Egypt", inspired Walter Savage Landor's first major piece, Gebir (1798).

Reeve seems to have managed her publishing career personally, rather than relying on male relations to deal with publishers on her behalf.

=== Death ===
Reeve led a retiring life and left little biographical material. She died in Ipswich and was buried, as she wished, in the churchyard of St Stephen's, next to her friend the Reverend Derby.

=== Influence ===
Written in response to Walpole's Castle of Otranto, The Old English Baron was a major influence on the development of Gothic fiction, gaining popularity for the genre in universities and among general readers. A contextual introduction that looks at Reeve in the context of late 18th-century women's writing and the history of the Gothic can be found in this book. Henrietta Mosse was to use this story as a model for her own novel, The Old Irish Baronet in 1808.

Although Reeve's The Progress of Romance, was long overlooked by scholars, Garry Kelly has called it "not only a pioneering history and defense of "romance" from antiquity to the mid-eighteenth century but also a ground- breaking work of literary scholarship by a woman".

Reeve's contribution to developing Gothic fiction can be demonstrated on at least two fronts. First there is the reinforcement of the Gothic narrative framework as one that focuses on expanding the imaginative domain to include the supernatural, but without losing the realism that marks the novel that Walpole pioneered. Secondly, Reeve also sought to find an appropriate formula for ensuring that fiction is believable and coherent. She spurned specific aspects of Walpole's style, such as his tendency to blend in humour or comedy that diminishes the Gothic tale's ability to induce fear. In 1777, Reeve enumerated Walpole's excesses:

a sword so large as to require an hundred men to lift it; a helmet that by its own weight forces a passage through a court-yard into an arched vault, big enough for a man to go through; a picture that walks out of its frame; a skeleton ghost in a hermit's cowl...

Although successive Gothic writers did not fully heed Reeve's emotional realism, she posited a framework that keeps Gothic fiction within the realm of the probable. This remained a challenge for authors after publication of The Old English Baron. Beyond its providential context, the supernatural often risked veering towards the absurd.

== Works ==
- The Phoenix (1772), an abridged translation of John Barclay's Argenis
- The Champion of Virtue (1777), republished as The Old English Baron (1778)
- The Two Mentors: A Modern Story (1783)
- The Progress of Romance (1785)
- The Exiles, or, Memoirs of the Count de Cronstadt (1788)
- The School for Widows: A Novel (1791)
- Plans of Education (1792)
- The Memoirs of Sir Roger de Clarendon (1793)
- Destination, or, Memoirs of a Private Family (1799)
- Edwin, King of Northumberland: A Story of the Seventh Century (1802)

== See also ==
- Gothic fiction
