= Walter Savage Landor =

English writer, poet, and activist (1775–1864)

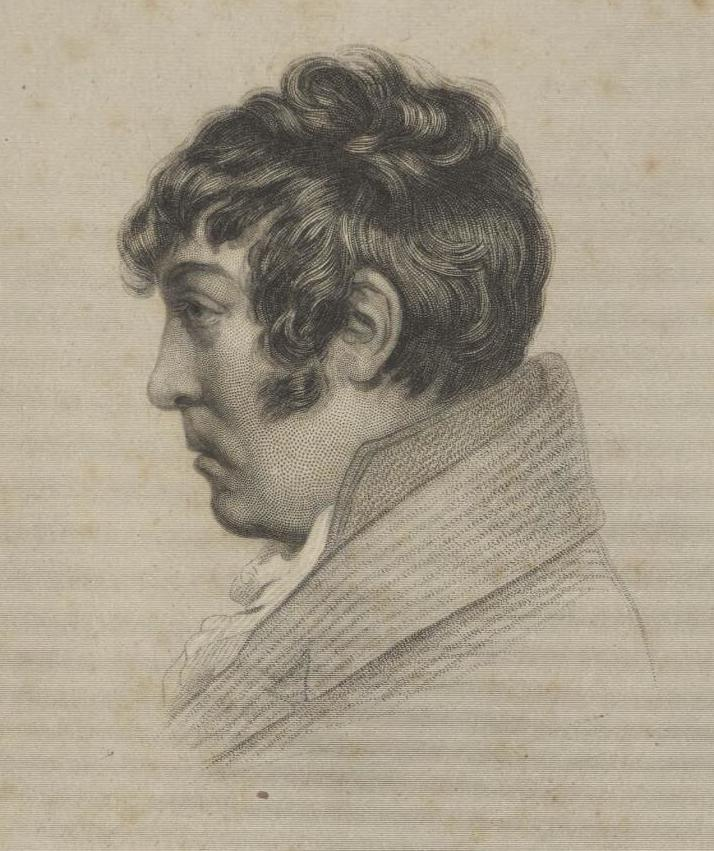
- Portrait of Walter Savage Landor
- Born: 30 January 1775; Warwick, England, Kingdom of Great Britain
- Died: 17 September 1864 (aged 89); Florence, Kingdom of Italy
- Education: Trinity College, Oxford (no degree)
- Occupations: Poet; novelist; activist
- Writing career
- Movement: Romanticism

Walter Savage Landor (30 January 1775 – 17 September 1864) was an English writer, poet, and activist. His best known works were the prose Imaginary Conversations, and the poem "Rose Aylmer," but the critical acclaim he received from contemporary poets and reviewers was not matched by public popularity. As remarkable as his work was, it was equalled by his rumbustious character and lively temperament. Both his writing and political activism, such as his support for Lajos Kossuth and Giuseppe Garibaldi, were imbued with his passion for liberal and republican causes. He befriended and influenced the next generation of literary reformers such as Charles Dickens and Robert Browning.

== Summary of his work ==
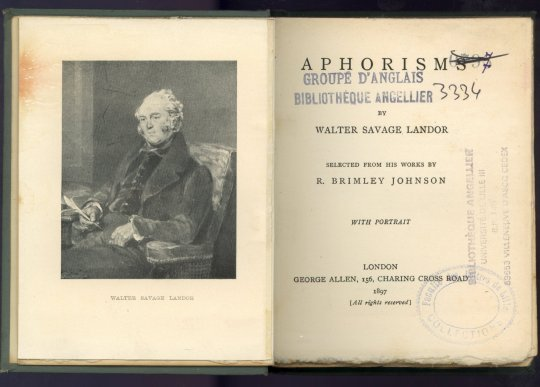
Walter Savage Landor

In a long and active life of 89 years Landor produced a considerable amount of work in various genres. This can perhaps be classified into four main areas – prose, lyric poetry, political writings including epigrams, and Latin. His prose and poetry have received most acclaim, but critics are divided in their preference between them and he is now often described as 'a poet's poet' and author of perhaps the greatest very short poems in English, 'Some of the best poets, Yeats, Ezra Pound and Robert Frost among them, steered by his lights'. Landor's prose is best represented by the Imaginary Conversations. He drew on a vast array of historical characters from Greek philosophers to contemporary writers and composed conversations between pairs of characters that covered areas of philosophy, politics, romance and many other topics. These exercises proved a more successful application of Landor's natural ability for writing dialogue than his plays. Although these have many quotable passages the overall effect suffered because he never learned the art of drama.

Landor wrote much sensitive and beautiful poetry. The love poems were inspired by a succession of female romantic ideals – Ione, Ianthe, Rose Aylmer and Rose Paynter. Equally sensitive are his "domestic" poems about his sister and his children.

In the course of his career Landor wrote for various journals on a range of topics that interested him from anti-Pitt politics to the unification of Italy. He was also a master of the epigram which he used to good effect and wrote satirically to avenge himself on politicians and other people who upset him.

Landor wrote over 300 Latin poems, political tracts and essays, but these have generally been ignored in the collections of his work. Landor found Latin useful for expressing things that might otherwise have been "indecent or unattractive" as he put it and as a cover for libellous material. Fellow classical scholars of the time put Landor's Latin work on a par with his English writing.

== Summary of his life ==
Landor's biography consists of a catalogue of incidents and misfortunes, many of them self-inflicted but some no fault of his own. His headstrong nature and hot-headed temperament, combined with a complete contempt for authority, landed him in a great deal of trouble over the years. By a succession of bizarre actions, he was successively thrown out of Rugby school, of Oxford and from time to time from the family home. In the course of his life he came into conflict deliberately with his political enemies – the supporters of Pitt – but inadvertently with a succession of Lord Lieutenants, Bishops, Lord Chancellors, Spanish officers, Italian Grand Dukes, nuncio legatos, lawyers and other minor officials. He usually gained the upper hand, if not with an immediate hilarious response, then possibly many years later with a biting epithet.

Landor's writing often landed him on the wrong side of the laws of libel, and even his refuge in Latin proved of no avail in Italy. Many times his friends had to come to his aid in smoothing the ruffled feathers of his opponents or in encouraging him to moderate his behaviour. His friends were equally active in the desperate attempts to get his work published, where he offended or felt cheated by a succession of publishers who found his work either unsellable or unpublishable. He was repeatedly involved in legal disputes with his neighbours whether in England or Italy and Dickens' characterisation of him in Bleak House revolves around such a dispute over a gate between Boythorn and Sir Leicester Dedlock. Fate dealt with him unfairly when he tried to put into practice his bold and generous ideas to improve the lot of man, or when he was mistaken at one time for an agent of the Prince of Wales and at another for a tramp. His stormy marriage with his long-suffering wife resulted in a long separation, and then when she had finally taken him back in a series of sad attempts to escape.

And yet Landor was described by Swinburne as "the kindest and gentlest of men". He collected a coterie of friends who went to great lengths to help him, and writing for the Encyclopædia Britannica Swinburne comments that "his loyalty and liberality of heart were as inexhaustible as his bounty and beneficence of hand", adding that "praise and encouragement, deserved or undeserved, came more readily to his lips than challenge or defiance". The numerous accounts of those with whom he came in contact reveal that he was fascinating company and he dined out on his wit and knowledge for a great part of his life. Landor's powerful sense of humour, expressed in his tremendous and famous laughs no doubt contributed to and yet helped assuage the slings and arrows of outrageous fortune. "His passionate compassion, his bitter and burning pity for all wrongs endured in all the world, found outlet in his lifelong defence of tyrannicide. His tender and ardent love of children, of animals and of flowers makes fragrant alike the pages of his writing and the records of his life".

== Early life ==
Walter Savage Landor was born in Warwick, England, the eldest son of Dr Walter Landor (1733–1805), a physician, and his second wife, Elizabeth (1743–1829), one of four daughters and heiresses of Charles Savage, of Tachbrook, Warwickshire. His birthplace, Eastgate House, became occupied by The King's High School For Girls. His father inherited estates at Rugeley, Staffordshire and his mother was heiress to estates at Ipsley Court and Bishop's Tachbrook in Warwickshire. Landor as the eldest son was heir to these properties and looked forward to a life of prosperity. The family tradition was Whig in reaction to George III and Pitt, and although Landor's brother Robert was the only other member to achieve fame as a writer there was a strong literary tradition in the family.

After attending a school at Knowle, he was sent to Rugby School under Dr James, but took offence at the headmaster's review of his work and was removed at Dr James' request. Years later, Landor included references to James in Latin in Simonidea with a mixture of praise and criticism and was subsequently reconciled with him. He then studied privately with Rev. William Langley, vicar of Fenny Bentley and headmaster of Ashbourne Grammar School. Langley was later mentioned in the Imaginary Conversation of Isaak Walton. Landor's temperament and violent opinions caused embarrassment at home and he was usually asked to absent himself when guests were expected. On one occasion he netted and threw in the river a local farmer who objected to his fishing on his property. In 1793 he entered Trinity College, Oxford where he showed rebelliousness in his informal dress and was known as a "mad Jacobin" since he was taken with ideas of French republicanism. His tutor Dr Benwell was impressed by him, but unfortunately his stay was short-lived. In 1794 he fired a gun at the windows of a Tory whose late night revels disturbed him and for whom he had an aversion. He was rusticated for a year, and, although the authorities were willing to condone the offence, he refused to return. The affair led to a quarrel with his father in which Landor expressed his intention of leaving home for ever.

Landor went to Tenby in Wales where he had a love affair with a local girl, Nancy Evans, for whom he wrote some of his earliest love poems referring to her as "Ione". Landor's father disapproved and he removed for a time to London, lodging near Portland Place. Ione subsequently had a child who died in infancy. In 1795 Landor brought out a small volume of English and Latin verse in three books entitled The Poems of Walter Savage Landor. Landor also wrote an anonymous Moral Epistle in pamphlet form of nineteen pages, respectfully dedicated to Earl Stanhope. It was a satire in heroic verse condemning Pitt for trying to suppress liberal influences. Although Landor subsequently disowned these "'prentice works", Swinburne wrote: "No poet at the age of twenty ever had more vigour of style and fluency of verse; nor perhaps has any ever shown such masterly command of epigram and satire, made vivid and vital by the purest enthusiasm and most generous indignation."

Landor was reconciled with his family through the efforts of his friend Dorothea Lyttelton. He later told Forster that he would have married Dorothea if he were financially independent. He did not enter a profession – he did not want the law, and no more did the army want him. His father allowed him £150 a year, and he was free to live at home or not, as he pleased.

== South Wales and Gebir ==
Landor settled in South Wales, returning home to Warwick for short visits. It was at Swansea that he became friendly with the family of Lord Aylmer, including his sister, Rose, whom Landor later immortalized in the poem, "Rose Aylmer". It was she who lent him The Progress of Romance by the Gothic author Clara Reeve. In this he found the story "The History of Charoba, Queen of Egypt", which inspired his poem Gebir. Rose Aylmer sailed to India with an aunt in 1798, and two years later died of cholera.

Ah, what avails the sceptred race,
Ah, what the form divine!
What every virtue, every grace!
Rose Aylmer, all were thine.

Rose Aylmer, whom these wakeful eyes
May weep, but never see,
A night of memories and of sighs
I consecrate to thee.

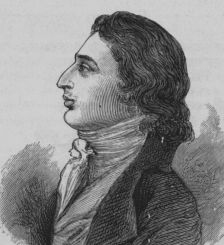
Robert Southey

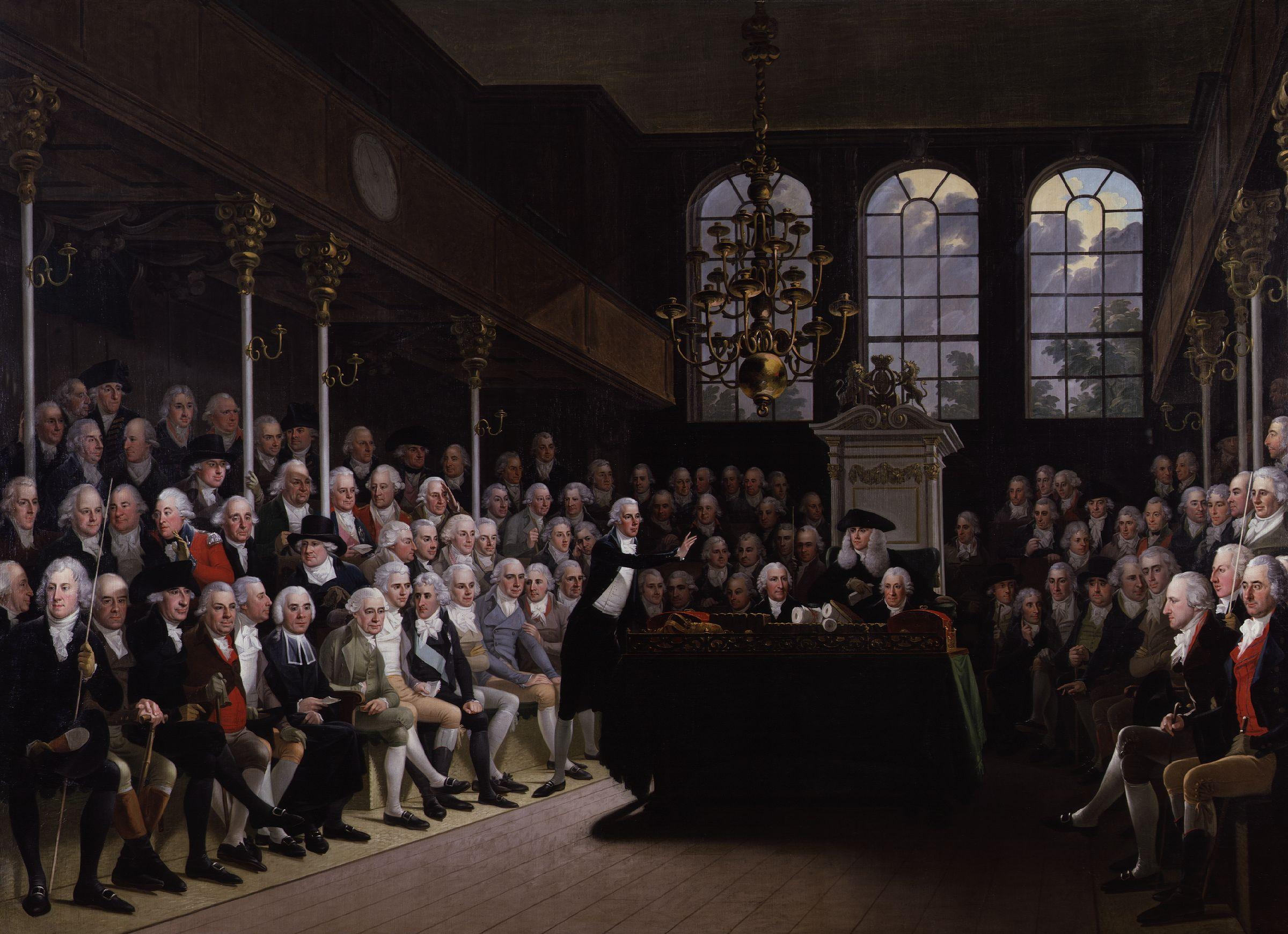
Pitt facing Fox across St Stephen's Chapel in Anton Hickel's The House of Commons, 1793–94.

In 1798 Landor published Gebir, the work which established his reputation. This long poem tells the story of a prince of Spain who falls in love with his enemy Queen Charoba of Egypt. Southey reviewed Gebir, calling it "some of the most exquisite poetry in the language" and was keen to discover the anonymous author. Sidney Colvin wrote "For loftiness of thought and language together, there are passages in Gebir that will bear comparison with Milton" and "nowhere in the works of Wordsworth or Coleridge do we find anything resembling Landor's peculiar qualities of haughty splendour and massive concentration". John Forster wrote "Style and treatment constitute the charm of it. The vividness with which everything in it is presented to sight as well as through the wealth of its imagery, its moods of language – these are characteristics pre-eminent in Gebir." Gifford, on the other hand, who was ever a harsh critic of Landor, described it as "A jumble of incomprehensible trash... the most vile and despicable effusion of a mad and muddy brain...".

For the next three years Landor led an unsettled life, spent mainly in London. He became a friend of the classics scholar Dr Samuel Parr who lived at Hatton near Warwick and who appreciated Landor as a person and a Latin writer. Landor favoured Latin as a way of expressing playful material without exposing it to public view. "Siquid forte iocosius cuivis in mentem veniat, id, vernacule, puderet, non-enim tantummodo in luce agitur sed etiam in publico." Latin also had the advantage of being exempt from libel laws in England. Parr introduced Landor to Robert Adair, party organiser for Charles James Fox, who enlisted Landor to write in The Morning Post and The Courier against the ministry of Pitt. Landor published Poems from the Arabic and Persian in 1800 and a pamphlet of Latin verses. During this time he met Isaac Mocatta who stimulated his interest in art and exercised a moderating influence, but Mocatta died 1801. In 1802 Landor went to Paris where he saw Napoleon at close quarters, and this was enough for him to revoke his former praise for Napoleon in Gebir. In the same year he published Poetry by the Author of Gebir which included the narrative poems "Crysaor" and "The Phocaeans". Colvin considered "Crysaor" Landor's finest piece of narrative in blank verse.

Landor's brother Robert helped with corrections and additions to Gebir and the second edition appeared in 1803. About the same time Landor published the whole poem in Latin, which did little to increase readership but appealed to Parr and was considered by Swinburne to be comparable with the English version in might and melody of line, and for power and perfection of language.

Landor travelled the country in constant debt, spending much time at Bath. Here he met Sophia Jane Swift, who was already engaged to her cousin Godwin Swifte, whom she married despite Landor's ardent entreaties in 1803. He called her Ianthe and wrote some of his most beautiful love poems to her. His father died in 1805, which put him in possession of an independent fortune and he settled in Bath, living in grand style. In 1806 he published Simonidea which included poems to Ianthe and Ione. It also included "Gunlaug and Helga" a narrative poem from William Herbert's Select Icelandic poems. At Bristol in 1808 he caught up with Southey, whom he had missed on a trip to the Lake District in the previous year, and the mutual appreciation of the two poets led to a warm friendship. He also wrote a work "The Dun Cow" which was written in defence of his friend Parr who had been attacked in an anonymous work "Guy's Porridge Pot", which Landor was fierce to deny was any work of his.

== Napoleonic Wars and Count Julian ==
In 1808 he had an heroic impulse to take part in the Peninsular War. At the age of 33, he left England for Spain as a volunteer to serve in the national army against Napoleon. He landed at Corunna, introduced himself to the British envoy, offered 10,000 reals for the relief of Venturada, and set out to join the army of General Joaquín Blake y Joyes. He was disappointed not to take part in any real action and found himself giving support at Bilbao where he was nearly captured. A couple of months later the Convention of Sintra brought an end to the campaign and Landor returned to England. The Spanish Government offered its thanks to him, and King Ferdinand appointed him a Colonel in the Spanish Army. However, when the King restored the Jesuits Landor returned his commission. When he returned to England, he joined Wordsworth and Southey in denouncing the Convention of Sintra, which had excited general indignation. In 1809 Landor wrote "Three letters to Don Francisco Riquelme" giving him the benefit of his wisdom as a participant in the war. He wrote an ode in Latin to Gustav IV of Sweden and wrote to press under various pseudonyms. In 1810 he wrote "a brave and good letter to Sir Francis Burdett."

The Spanish experience provided inspiration for the tragedy of Count Julian, based on Julian, count of Ceuta. Although this demonstrated Landor's distinctive style of writing, it suffered from his failure to study the art of drama and so made little impression. The plot is difficult to follow unless the story is previously known and concerns a complicated situation after the defeat of the last Visigoth King of Spain. It carries the moral tone of crime propagating crime. Southey undertook to arrange publication and eventually got it published by Murray in 1812, after an initial refusal by Longmans which led Landor to burn another tragedy "Ferranti and Giulio". Thomas de Quincey later wrote of the work

Mr Landor is probably the one man in Europe that has adequately conceived the situation, the stern self-dependency and monumental misery of Count Julian.

Swinburne described it as:

the sublimest poem published in our language, between the last masterpiece of Milton (Samson Agonistes) and the first masterpiece of Shelley (Prometheus Unbound), one equally worthy to stand unchallenged beside either for poetic perfection as well as moral majesty. The superhuman isolation of agony and endurance which encircles and exalts the hero is in each case expressed with equally appropriate magnificence of effect. The style of Count Julian, if somewhat deficient in dramatic ease and the fluency of natural dialogue, has such might and purity and majesty of speech as elsewhere we find only in Milton so long and so steadily sustained.

== Llanthony and marriage ==
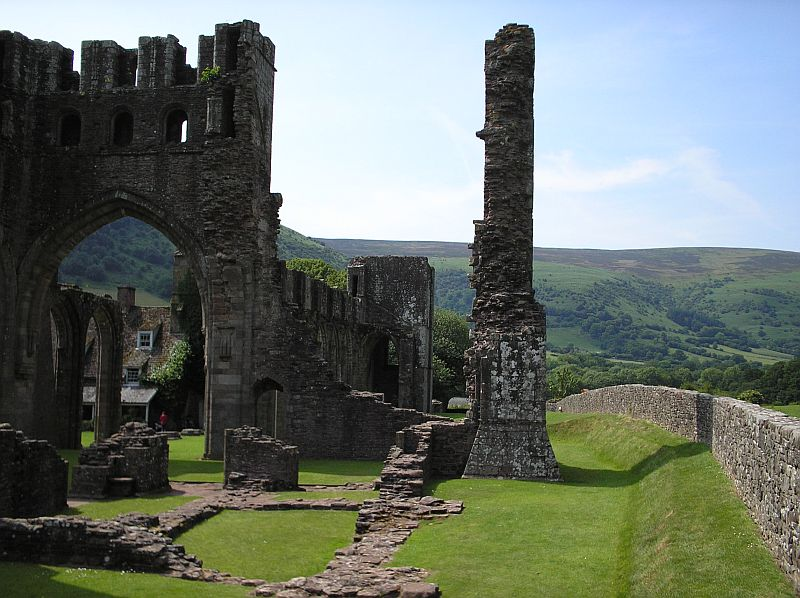
Llanthony – Landor's estate

Before going to Spain, he had been looking for a property and settled on Llanthony Abbey in Monmouthshire, a ruined Benedictine abbey. He sold the property at Rugeley which he inherited from his father, and persuaded his mother to sell her Tachbrook estate to contribute to the purchase cost. On his return from Spain he was busy finalising these matters. The previous owner had erected some buildings in the ruins of the ancient abbey, but an Act of Parliament, passed in 1809, was needed to allow Landor to pull down these buildings and construct a house, (which was never finished). He wanted to become a model country gentleman, planting trees, importing sheep from Spain, and improving the roads. There is still an avenue of trees in the area known as "Landor's Larches" and many old chestnuts have been dated back to his time.

In 1811 he went to a ball in Bath and seeing a pretty girl exclaimed "That's the nicest girl in the room, and I'll marry her". She was Julia Thuillier, the daughter of an impoverished Swiss banker who had an unsuccessful business at Banbury and had gone to Spain, leaving his family at Bath. They married at St James' Church, Bath on 24 May 1811 and settled for a while at Llanthony Abbey. Landor had a visit from Southey, after he sent him a letter describing the idylls of country life, including nightingales and glow-worms. However the idyll was not to last long as for the next three years Landor was worried by the combined vexation of neighbours and tenants, lawyers and lords-lieutenant and even the Bishop of St David's, while at the same time he tried to publish an article on Fox, a response to a sycophantic piece by John Bernard Trotter, which was condemned by the prospective publisher John Murray as libellous and damned by Canning and Gifford.

His troubles with the neighbours stemmed from petty squabbles, many arising from his headstrong and impetuous nature. He employed a solicitor, one Charles Gabell, who saw him as a client to be milked. His trees were uprooted and his timber stolen. A man against whom he had to swear the peace drank himself to death, and he was accused of causing the misfortune and when he prosecuted a man for theft he was insulted by the defendant's counsel (whom he later "chastised" in his Latin poetry). He was fond of revenge through his verse, Latin or otherwise and gave his opinion of his lawyers in the following piece of doggerel.

If the devil, a mighty old omnibus driver
Saw an omnibus driving downhill to a river
And saved any couple to share his own cab
I really do think t'would be Gabell & Gabb.

When the Bishop failed to reply to his letter offering to restore part of the priory Landor followed up saying "God alone is great enough for me to ask anything of twice". He wanted to become a magistrate and after a row with the Lord Lieutenant, the Duke of Beaufort, who was suspicious of his republican sympathies, he pursued the matter with the Lord Chancellor, Lord Eldon, well known as a High Tory, without success. He wasted much effort and money in noble attempts to improve the land, and to relieve the wretchedness and raise the condition of the poorer inhabitants. The final straw was when he let his farmland to one Betham who was incompetent and extravagant and paid no rent. After an expensive action to recover the debts from Betham he had had enough, and decided to leave the country, abandoning Llanthony to his creditors – which was principally his mother. He had drafted a book-length Commentary on the Memoires of Mr. Charles Fox which presents the radical Whig leader in a positive light and includes a dedication to American president James Madison and strong criticism of the Tory government and Canning, but left it unpublished for fear of prosecution.

In 1814 Landor left England for Jersey, where he had a quarrel with his wife and set off for France on his own. Eventually she joined him at Tours as did his brother Robert. At Tours he met Francis George Hare, brother of Julius Charles Hare who was to be of great help to him. Landor soon became dissatisfied with Tours and after conflicts with his landlady set off in September 1815 with his wife and brother on a journey to Italy.

== Florence and Imaginary Conversations ==
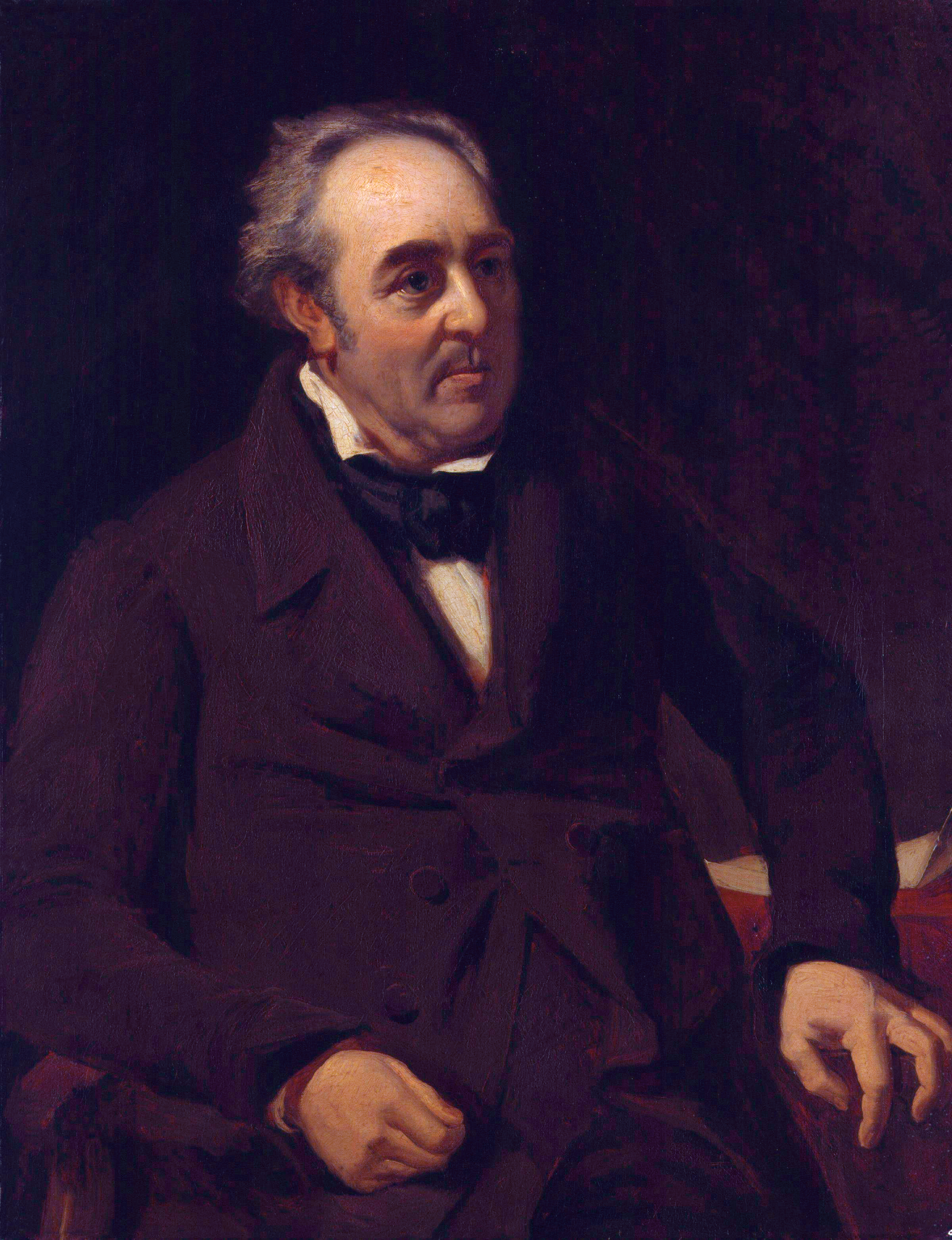
Walter Savage Landor by William Fisher

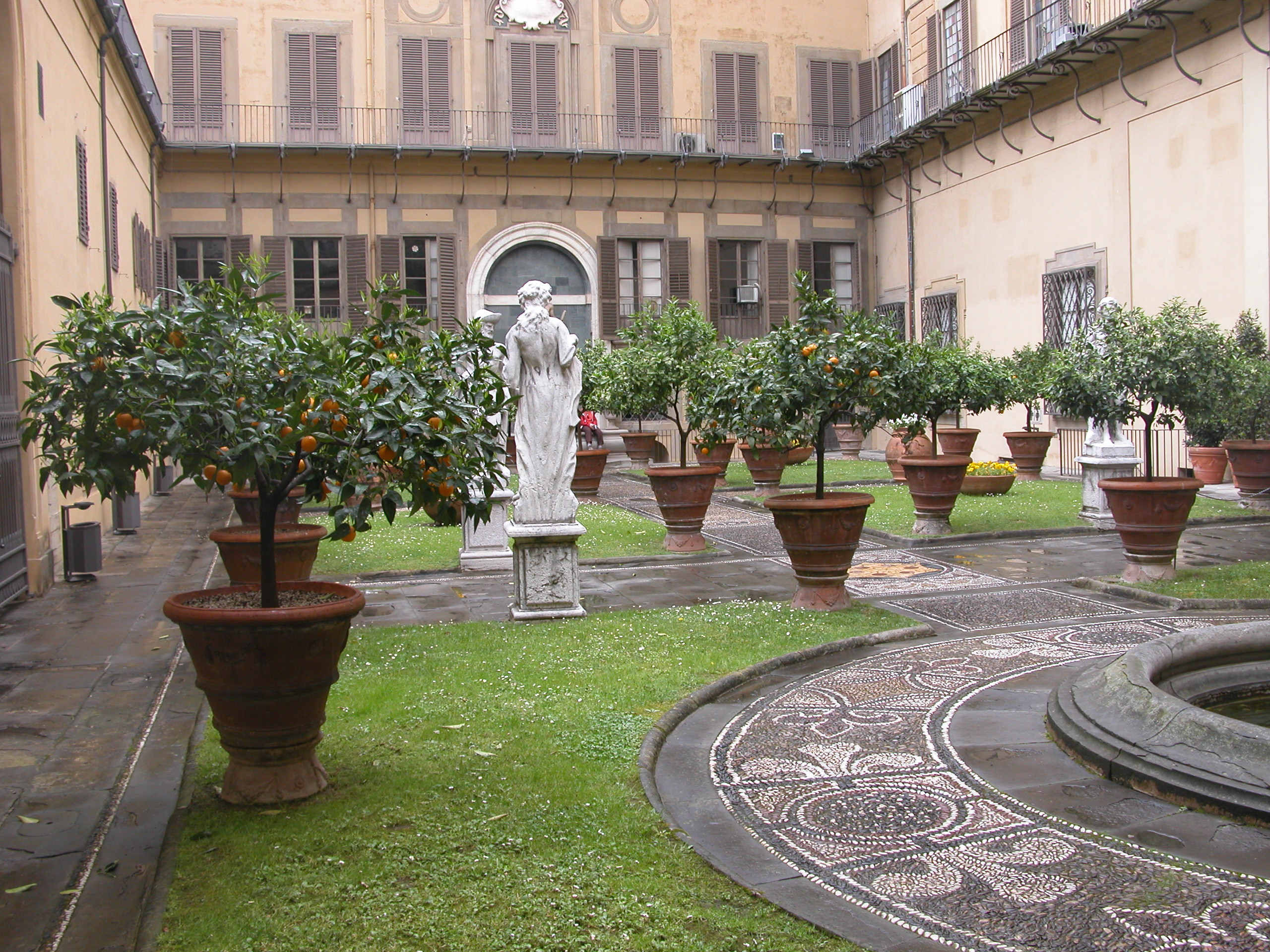
Inner courtyard of Palazzo Medici-Riccardi

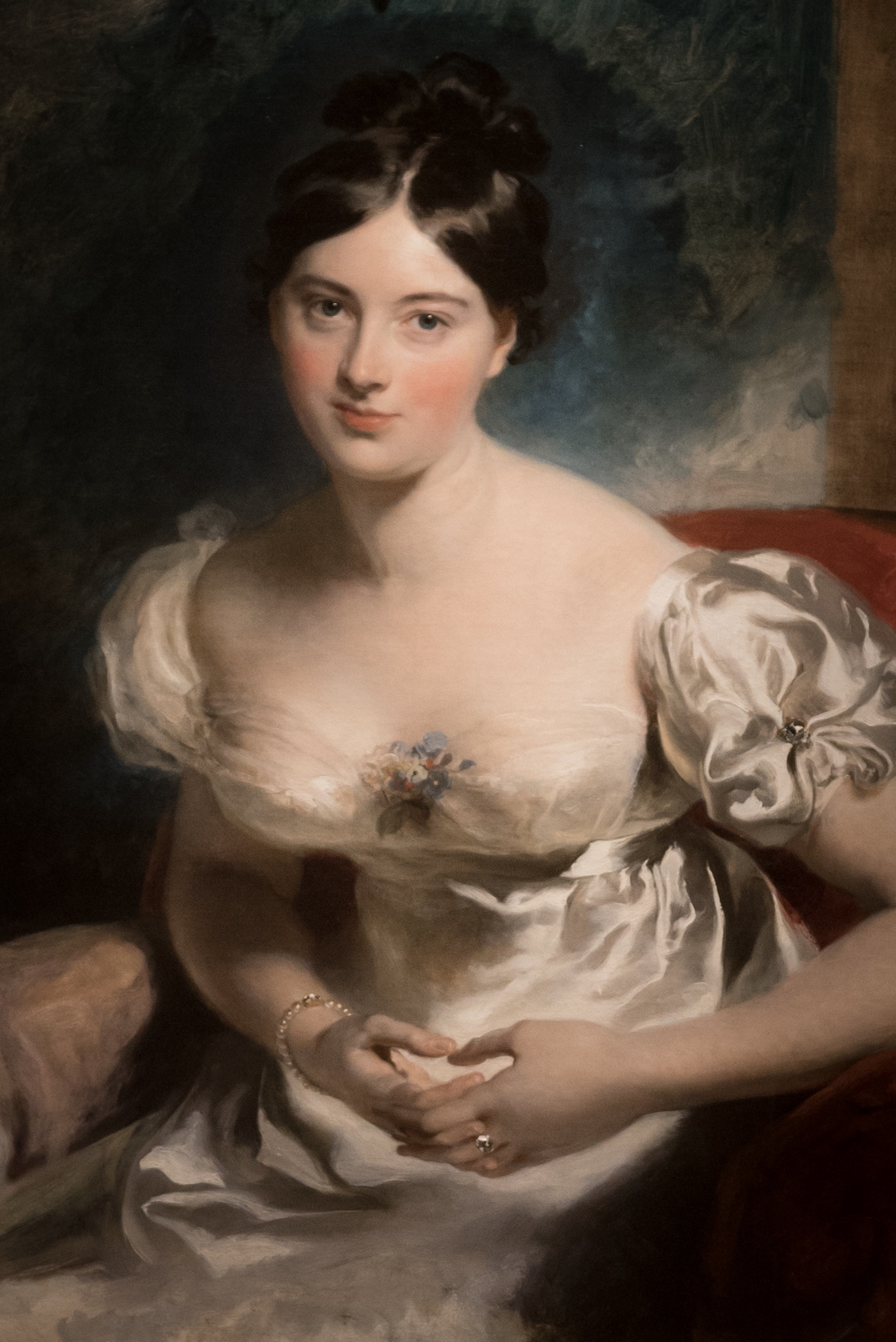
Portrait of the Countess of Blessington. Painted by Thomas Lawrence in 1822.

Landor and his wife finally settled at Como, where they stayed for three years. Even here he had troubles, for at the time Caroline of Brunswick, wife of the Prince Regent was living there and Landor was suspected of being an agent involved in watching her in case of divorce proceedings. In 1818 he insulted the authorities in a Latin poem directed against an Italian poet who had denounced England, not realising that the libel laws in Italy (unlike in England) applied to Latin writings as well as Italian. After threatening the regio delegato with a beating he was ordered to leave Como. In September he went to Genoa and Pisa. He finally settled at Florence in 1821. After two years in apartments in the Medici Palace, he settled with his wife and children at the Villa Castiglione. In this, the most important period in his literary career, he produced some of his best known works – the Imaginary Conversations. It was at this time that Lady Blessington and her husband were living at Florence and became firm friends.

The first two volumes of his Imaginary Conversations appeared in 1824 with a second edition in 1826; a third volume was added in 1828; and in 1829 the fourth and fifth volumes were published. Not until 1846 was a fresh instalment added, in the second volume of his collected and selected works. Many of the imaginary conversations harshly criticize authoritarian rule and endorse republican principles.

With these works, Landor acquired a high, but not wide literary reputation. He had various disputes with the authorities in Florence. The theft of some silver led to altercations with the police, whose interviews with tradesmen ended up defining him as a "dangerous man", and the eventual upshot was that the Grand Duke banished him from Florence. Subsequently, the Grand Duke took the matter good-naturedly, and ignored Landor's declaration that, as the authorities disliked his residence, he should reside there permanently. In 1829, Landor bought the Villa Gherardesca at Fiesole helped by a generous loan from Joseph Ablett of Llanbedr Hall, Denbighshire. Here he had a dispute with a neighbour about water rights, which led to a lawsuit and a challenge, although the English Consul Kirkup succeeded in arranging the point of honour satisfactorily. Landor was visited by William Hazlitt and Leigh Hunt, and was on intimate terms with Charles Armitage Brown. It was at this time he became acquainted with Edward John Trelawny whom he included in volume IV of Imaginary Conversations. His mother, with whom he had always corresponded affectionately, died in October 1829 and his cousin Walter Landor of Rugeley took over the management of the estate in Wales. Landor was happy at Villa Gherardesca for several years, writing books, playing with his children whom he adored and with the nightingales, and planting his gardens. He had many visitors, most notably in 1829 Jane Swift (Ianthe) now a widow, who inspired him to write poetry again. Later came Henry Crabb Robinson with whom he got on extremely well. In 1831 he published a volume combining Gebir, Count Julian and Other Poems (including 31 to Ianthe). Although this sold only 40 copies, Landor was unconcerned as he was working on "High and Low Life in Italy". This last work he sent to Crabb Robinson for publication but he had difficulties with publishers and it did not appear until 1837.

In 1832 Ablett persuaded him to visit England, where he met many old friends. He saw Ianthe at Brighton and met Lord Wenlock. He also visited his family in Staffordshire – his brother Charles was rector of Colton, and his cousin Walter Landor of Rugeley was trying to deal with the complex business of Llanthony. He visited Charles Lamb at Enfield, Samuel Coleridge at Highgate, and Julius Hare at Cambridge. He went with Ablett to the Lake District and saw Southey and Coleridge.

On returning to Fiesole he found his children out of hand and obtained a German governess for them. Back in Italy he met Richard Monckton Milnes who later wrote about him. He was visited by Ralph Waldo Emerson and worked on the conversations which led to the volumes upon "Shakespeare's Examinations for Deer Stealing", "Pericles and Aspasia", and the "Pentameron". Lady Blessington sold "Shakespeare" for him. In 1835 Ianthe visited again, and brought her half-sister, Mrs Paynter, with her. Landor's wife Julia became jealous, although she already had a younger lover, and their difference of opinion ended in a complete separation.

== England, Pericles and journalism ==
Landor was 60 by now and went to Lucca, where he finished "Pericles and Aspasia" and in September returned to England alone in the autumn. He had an income of about £600 per annum from properties in England, but when he left Italy he made over £400 of the share to his wife, and transferred the villa and farms at Fiesole to his son Arnold absolutely. His income was now £200 a year and he was in financial difficulties. He stayed with Ablett at Llanbedr for three months, spent winter at Clifton and returned to him afterwards, when Ablett persuaded him to contribute to "Literary Hours" which was published the next year. "Pericles and Aspasia", which was to become one of his most appreciated works, was published in March 1836. It is in the form of an Imaginary Conversation and describes the development of Aspasia's romance with Pericles, who died in the Peloponnesian War, told in a series of letters to a friend Cleone. The work is one of Landor's most joyous works and is singled out by contemporary critics as an introduction to Landor at his best. On one occasion Landor was travelling to Clifton incognito and chatting to a fellow traveller when the traveller, John Sterling, observed that his strange paradoxical conversation sounded like one of Landor's Imaginary Conversations. Landor covered his retreat, but later became acquainted formally with Sterling.

Also in 1836, Landor met John Forster who became his biographer, having become friends after Forster's review of his "Shakespeare". Later that year he went to Heidelberg in Germany hoping to meet his children, but was disappointed. He wrote more imaginary conversations including one between Lord Eldon and Escombe. When a lady friend rebuked him for this on the basis that Eldon was now over eighty, Landor replied unmoved with the quip "The devil is older". He had several other publications that year besides Pericles, including "Letter from a Conservative", "A Satire on Satirists" which included a criticism of Wordsworth's failure to appreciate Southey, Alabiadas the Young Man, and "Terry Hogan", a satire on Irish priests. He wintered again at Clifton where Southey visited him. It is possible that Ianthe was living at Bristol, but the evidence is not clear, and in 1837 she went to Austria, where she remained for some years. After leaving Clifton, Landor travelled around and visited Armitage Brown at Plymouth. He established many friendships including John Kenyon and Sir William Napier. At the end of the year he published "Death of Clytemnestra" and "The Pentalogia", containing five of his finest shorter studies in dramatic poetry. The last piece to be published was "Pentameron". Although this had no financial success it was much admired by his friends including Kenyon, Julius Hare, Crabb Robinson, Elizabeth Barrett Browning who said "some of the pages are too delicious to turn over", and Leigh Hunt who reckoned it Landor's masterpiece. In the spring of 1838 he took a house in Bath and wrote his three plays the "Andrea of Hungary", "Giovanna of Naples", and "Fra Rupert". These plays are in the form of a trilogy in the first of which Fra Rupert contrives the death of Andrea, husband of Giovanna. Giovanna is suspected but acquitted in the second play. In the third play Fra Rupert is discovered. George Saintsbury described these as a historical novel thrown into conversational dramatic form. In 1839 Landor's attempts to publish the plays were caught up in a dispute between Bentley and Dickens and Forster which caused considerable delay. Again, although these plays, or "conversations in verse" did not succeed with the public, Landor gained warm admirers, many of whom were his personal friends. Southey's mind was giving way when he wrote a last letter to his friend in 1839, but he continued to mention Landor's name when generally incapable of mentioning anyone. Landor wandered around the country again, frequently visiting London, where he usually stayed with Lady Blessington, whom he had known at Florence. Mrs Paynter and her daughter Rose Paynter were at Bath, and Landor's letters and verses to Rose are among his best works. Rose later married Charles Graves-Sawle of Penrice in Cornwall. Landor met Charles Dickens and they enjoyed each other's company despite the age difference. Landor greatly admired Dickens's works, and was especially moved by the character of Nell Trent (from The Old Curiosity Shop). Landor was affectionately adapted by Dickens as Lawrence Boythorn in Bleak House. He was the godfather of Dickens's son Walter Landor Dickens. He also became introduced to Robert Browning, who sent him a dedicated copy of his work.

Landor received a visit from his son Arnold in 1842 and in that year wrote a long essay on Catullus for Forster, who was editor of "Foreign Quarterly Review"; he followed it up with The Idylls of Theocritus. R. H. Super was critical of the essays claiming "A more thoroughly disorganised work never fell from his pen". In 1843 he mourned the death of his friend Southey and dedicated a poem in the Examiner. Landor was visited by his children Walter and Julia and published a poem to Julia in Blackwood's magazine.

By that dejected city, Arno runs,
Where Ugolino claspt his famisht sons.
There wert thou born, my Julia! there thine eyes
Return'd as bright a blue to vernal skies.
And thence, my little wanderer! when the Spring
Advanced, thee, too, the hours on silent wing
Brought, while anemonies were quivering round,
And pointed tulips pierced the purple ground,
Where stood fair Florence: there thy voice first blest
My ear, and sank like balm into my breast
For many griefs had wounded it, and more
Thy little hands could lighten were in store.
But why revert to griefs? Thy sculptured brow
Dispels from mine its darkest cloud even now.
And all that Rumour has announced of grace!
I urge, with fevered breast, the four-month day.
O! could I sleep to wake again in May.

In the following year his daughter Julia returned and gave him a dog Pomero, who was a faithful companion for a long time. In the same year, he published a poem to Browning in the Morning Chronicle.

Forster and Dickens used to visit Bath, to celebrate Landor's birthday and Charles I's execution on the same day. Forster helped Landor in publishing his plays and the 'Collected Works' in 1846, and was employed on The Examiner to which Landor frequently contributed on political and other subjects. Forster objected to the inclusion of some Latin poetry, and so Landor published his most important Latin work 'Poemata et Inscriptiones' separately in 1847. This consisted of large additions to the main contents of two former volumes of idyllic, satiric, elegiac and lyric verse. One piece referred to George IV whose treatment of Caroline of Brunswick had been distasteful to Landor.

Heic jacet,
Qui ubique et semper jacebat
Familiae pessimae homo pessimus
Georgius Britanniae Rex ejus nominis IV
Arca ut decet ampla et opipare ornata est
Continet enim omnes Nerones.

Translation:

Here lies a person
who was always lying about all over the place
– the worst member of the worst family –
George the fourth of that name of Britain.
It is suitable that the vault be large and excessively decorated
as it contains all the Neros.

Landor's distaste for the House of Hanover is more famously displayed in the doggerel that many do not realise is his composition:

George the First was always reckoned
Vile, but viler George the Second.
And what mortal ever heard
Any good of George the Third,
But when from earth the Fourth descended
God be praised the Georges ended.

In 1846 he also published the Hellenics, including the poems published under that title in the collected works, together with English translations of the Latin idyls. In this year he first met Eliza Lynn who was to become an outstanding novelist and journalist as Lynn Linton, and she became a regular companion in Bath. Now aged over 70, Landor was losing many of his old friends and becoming more frequently ill himself. On one occasion when staying with the Graves-Sawle he visited Exeter and sheltered in the rain on the doorstep of a local barrister, James Jerwood. Jerwood mistook him for a tramp and drove him away. Landor's follow-up letter of abuse to the barrister is magnificent: highlighting the man's "insulting language ... violent demeanour" and "coarseness and vehemence"; casting doubt on Jerwood's education (particularly in Latin); observing "Barristers in general carry a change of tongue about them, altho (sic) some of them do not put on a clean one so often as we could wish"; and lecturing him on the proprieties and "decency" involved in interacting not only with gentlemen- Landor firmly establishing himself amongst them- but with "even the lowest of men". R. H. Super, in his Walter Savage Landor – A Biography (1954) observes that "the very survival of this letter shows that Jerwood, when he received it, at least knew with whom he had to deal... it warms the heart to see that Landor's sharpest thrust was the suggestion that his man could not read Latin".

In 1849 he wrote a well-known epitaph for himself on his 74th birthday:

I strove with none, for none was worth my strife.
Nature I loved, and, next to nature, Art;
I warm'd both hands before the fire of Life;
It sinks, and I am ready to depart.

However he was leading an active social life. Tennyson met him in 1850 and recorded how while another guest fell downstairs and broke his arm, "Old Landor went on eloquently discoursing of Catullus and other Latin poets as if nothing had happened". Thomas Carlyle visited him and wrote "He was really stirring company: a proud irascible, trenchant, yet generous, veracious, and very dignified old man". In 1851 Landor expressed interest in Church reform with a pamphlet "Popery, British and Foreign", and Letters to Cardinal Wiseman. He published various other articles in The Examiner, Fraser's Magazine and other journals. During the year he learnt of the death of his beloved Ianthe and wrote in tribute to her:

Sophia! whom I seldom call'd by name,
And trembled when I wrote it; O my friend
Severed so long from me! one morn I dreamt
That we were walking hand in hand thro' paths
Slippery with sunshine: after many years
Had flown away, and seas and realms been crost,
And much (alas how much!) by both endured
We joined our hands together and told our tale.
And now thy hand hath slipt away from mine,
And the cold marble cramps it; I dream one,
Dost thou dream too? and are our dreams the same?

In 1853 he published the collected Imaginary Conversations of the Greeks and Romans, which he dedicated to Dickens. Dickens in this year published Bleak House, which contained the amazingly realistic characterisation of Landor as Boythorn. He also published "The Last Fruit off an Old Tree," containing fresh conversations, critical and controversial essays, miscellaneous epigrams, lyrics and occasional poems of various kind and merit, closing with Five Scenes on the Martyrdom of Beatrice Cenci. Swinburne described these as "unsurpassed even by their author himself for noble and heroic pathos, for subtle and genial, tragic and profound, ardent and compassionate insight into character, with consummate mastery of dramatic and spiritual truth." At this time Landor was interesting himself in foreign affairs, in particular Czarist oppression as he saw it and Louis Napoleon. At the end of 1854 his beloved sister Elizabeth died and he wrote a touching memorial:

Sharp crocus wakes the froward year;
In their old haunts birds reappear;
From yonder elm, yet black with rain,
The cushat looks deep down for grain
Thrown on the gravel-walk; here comes
The redbreast to the sill for crumbs.
Fly off! fly off! I can not wait
To welcome ye, as she of late.
The earliest of my friends is gone.
Alas! almost my only one!
The few as dear, long wafted o'er,
Await me on a sunnier shore.

In 1856 at the age of 81 he published Antony and Octavius: Scenes for the Study, twelve consecutive poems in dialogue, and "Letter to Emerson", as well as continuing Imaginary Conversations.

== Final tragedies and return to Italy ==
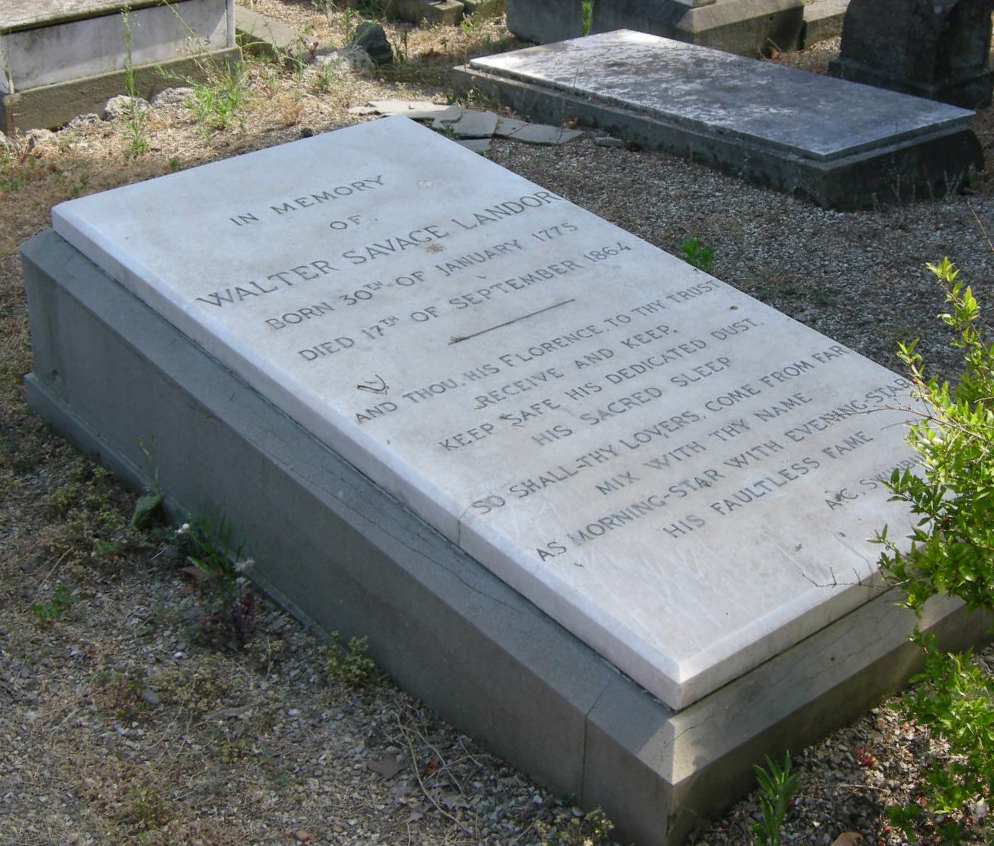
His tomb in English Cemetery at Florence

In the beginning of 1857, Landor's mind was becoming weakened and he found himself in some unpleasant situations. He became involved in a court case because he had published statements when the case was sub judice and was insulted by counsel as a poor old man brought in to talk twaddle. He then became embroiled in a miserable quarrel between two ladies he knew. He gave one of them, Geraldine Hooper, £100, a legacy received from his friend Kenyon. Unknown to Landor she transferred half of it to the other lady, a Mrs Yescombe. They then quarreled and Mrs Yescombe accused Hooper of having obtained the money from Landor for dishonourable reasons. Landor in his fury wrote a pamphlet "Walter Savage Landor and the Honourable Mrs Yescombe," which was considered libellous. Forster persuaded Landor to apologise. Then in 1858 he produced a miscellaneous collection called "Dry Sticks Fagoted by W. S. Landor," which contained among other things some epigrammatic and satirical attacks which led to further libel actions.

In July that year Landor returned to Italy for the last six years of his life. He was advised to make over his property to his family, on whom he now depended. He hoped to resume his life with his wife and children but found them living disreputably at the Villa Gherardesca and ill-disposed to welcome him. He spent a miserable ten months at his villa, and fled repeatedly to Florence, only to be brought back again. On the last occasion, he took refuge at a hotel in Florence, with next to nothing in his pocket, and was found by Robert Browning then living at the Casa Guidi. Browning managed to obtain an allowance for him from the family and settled him first at Siena and then at Florence.

Landor busied himself with new editions of his works and interested himself in the unification of Italy. He wrote frequently to Eliza Lynn Linton and added to Imaginary Conversations devising any sale proceeds to the relief of Garibaldi's soldiers. Anthony Trollope visited Florence and brought with him an American girl, Kate Field, who became Landor's protégée. He was still charming, venerable, and courteous, and full of literary interests. He taught Kate Field Latin, repeated poetry and composed some last conversations. In 1861, Browning left Italy after the death of his wife. Landor afterwards seldom left the house and remained petulant and uncomfortable, occasionally visited by his sons. He was much concerned about the fate of his picture collection, little of which had any merit, and about preparations for his grave as he hoped to be buried at Widcombe near Bath. He published some Imaginary Conversations in the 'Atheneum' in 1861–62 and in 1863 published a last volume of "Heroic Idyls, with Additional Poems, English and Latin", described by Swinburne as " the last fruit of a genius which after a life of eighty-eight years had lost nothing of its majestic and pathetic power, its exquisite and exalted". Forster's refusal to publish more about the libel case had interrupted their friendship, but they renewed their correspondence before his death. Almost the last event of his life was a visit in 1864 from the poet Swinburne, who visited Florence specifically to see him, and dedicated to him the 'Atalanta in Calydon'. In 1864 on May Day Landor said to his landlady "I shall never write again. Put out the lights and draw the curtains". A few months later he died quietly in Florence at the age of 89. He was buried not after all at Widcombe but in the English Cemetery, Florence, near the tomb of his friend, Elizabeth Barrett Browning. A statue of his wife can also be found in the 'English' Cemetery, above the tomb of their son, Arnold Savage Landor. In England a memorial bust to Landor was later placed in the Church of St Mary's, Warwick. Later, his Villa Gherardesca in Fiesole would become the home of the American Icelandic scholar Daniel Willard Fiske, who renamed it the 'Villa Landor'. Landor's grandson was the writer explorer and adventurer Arnold Henry Savage Landor.

Landor was a close friend of Southey and Coleridge. His relationship with Wordsworth changed over time from great praise to a certain resentment. Lord Byron tended to ridicule and revile him, and though Landor had little good to say in return during Byron's life, he lamented and extolled him as a dead hero. He lavished sympathetic praise on the noble dramatic works of his brother Robert Eyres Landor.

== Review of Landor's work by Swinburne ==
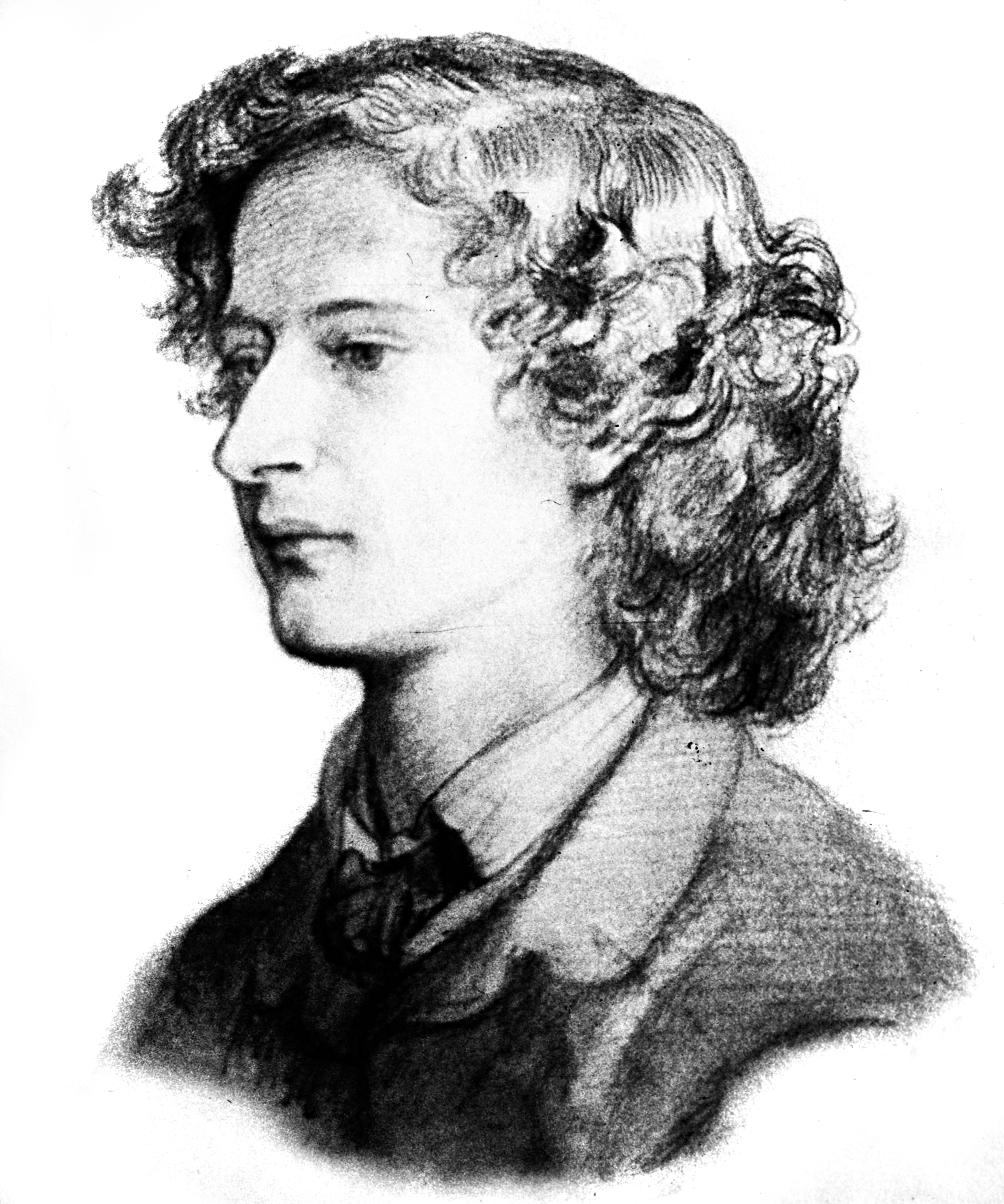
Algernon Charles Swinburne, sketch by Dante Gabriel Rossetti

Swinburne wrote in the ninth edition of the Encyclopædia Britannica (replicated in the eleventh edition) and later published in his Miscellanies of 1886 an appreciation which included the following passage (here broken into paragraphs for easier reading):

From nineteen almost to ninety his intellectual and literary activity was indefatigably incessant; but, herein at least like Charles Lamb, whose cordial admiration he so cordially returned, he could not write a note of three lines which did not bear the mark of his Roman hand in its matchless and inimitable command of a style at once the most powerful and the purest of his age.

The one charge which can ever seriously be brought and maintained against it is that of such occasional obscurity or difficulty as may arise from excessive strictness in condensation of phrase and expurgation of matter not always superfluous, and sometimes almost indispensable. His English prose and his Latin verse are perhaps more frequently and more gravely liable to this charge than either his English verse or his Latin prose. At times it is well-nigh impossible for an eye less keen and swift, a scholarship less exquisite and ready than his own, to catch the precise direction and follow the perfect course of his rapid thought and radiant utterance.

This apparently studious pursuit and preference of the most terse and elliptic expression which could be found for anything he might have to say could not but occasionally make even so sovereign a master of two great languages appear dark with excess of light; but from no former master of either tongue in prose or verse was ever the quality of real obscurity, of loose and nebulous incertitude, more utterly alien or more naturally remote. There is nothing of cloud or fog about the path on which he leads us; but we feel now and then the want of a bridge or a handrail; we have to leap from point to point of narrative or argument without the usual help of a connecting plank. Even in his dramatic works, where least of all it should have been found, this lack of visible connection or sequence in details of thought or action is too often a source of sensible perplexity. In his noble trilogy on the history of Giovanna queen of Naples it is sometimes actually difficult to realize on a first reading what has happened or is happening, or how, or why, or by what agency a defect alone sufficient, but unhappily sufficient in itself, to explain the too general ignorance of a work so rich in subtle and noble treatment of character, so sure and strong in its grasp and rendering of high actions and high passions, so rich in humour and in pathos, so royally serene in its commanding power upon the tragic mainsprings of terror and of pity.

As a poet, he may be said on the whole to stand midway between Byron and Shelley – about as far above the former as below the latter. If we except Catullus and Simonides, it might be hard to match and it would be impossible to overmatch the flawless and blameless yet living and breathing beauty of his most perfect elegies, epigrams or epitaphs. As truly as prettily was he likened by Leigh Hunt to a stormy mountain pine which should produce lilies. He was a classic, and no formalist; the wide range of his admiration had room for a genius so far from classical as Blake's. Nor in his own highest mood or method of creative as of critical work was he a classic only, in any narrow or exclusive sense of the term. On either side, immediately or hardly below his mighty masterpiece of Pericles and Aspasia, stand the two scarcely less beautiful and vivid studies of medieval Italy and Shakespeare in England.

== Artistic recognition ==
A bust of Landor dated 1828 by John Gibson is held in the National Portrait Gallery, London.

== See also ==
- List of Landor's Imaginary Conversations
