= Imaginary Conversations =

Prose work by Walter Savage Landor

Imaginary Conversations is Walter Savage Landor's most celebrated prose work. Begun in 1823, sections were constantly revised and were ultimately published in a series of five volumes. The conversations were in the tradition of dialogues with the dead, a genre begun in Classical times that had a popular European revival in the 17th century and after. Their subjects range over philosophical, political and moral themes, and are designed to give a dramatic sense of the contrasting personalities and attitudes involved.

== The work ==
The Imaginary Conversations were begun when Landor was living in Florence and were initially published as they were completed between 1824 and 1829, by which time they filled three volumes. The dialogues, not yet divided into categories, were initially given the composite title Conversations of Literary Men and Statesmen. With their success Landor continued to write more, as well as to polish and add to those already published. Some appeared first in literary reviews, as for example the conversation between "Southey and Porson" on William Wordsworth's poetry in 1823, predating the first published series of conversations in the following year. Various supplemented editions followed each other until there were five volumes containing nearly 150 conversations.

Placing the conversations in the context of his complete works, the reviewer of The Athenaeum commented that "his prose style is poetical in conception and dramatic in utterance; his conversations are, as has been said, one-act dramas, and his dramas are but dialogues in verse." His biographer Sidney Colvin, too, saw in "the excellence of Landor's English, the strength, dignity, and harmony of his prose style, qualities in which he was obviously without a living rival." Against acceptance of the arguments there, however, must be set the evident bias of the author's viewpoint, a tendency satirised in a parody of the time and confirmed by subsequent criticism.

== Order of conversations ==
In later editions, the conversations were grouped as follows:

- Classical Dialogues, Greek and Roman.
- Dialogues of Sovereigns and Statesmen.
- Dialogues of Literary Men,
- Dialogues of Literary Men (contd); Dialogues of Famous Women.
- Miscellaneous Dialogues.

== Background ==
The possibility has been mentioned that Landor was speaking biographically when, in the course of a later work, he has Petrarch describe how, "among the chief pleasures of my life, and among the commonest of my occupations, was the bringing before me such heroes and heroines of antiquity, such poets and sages, such of the prosperous and unfortunate as most interested me"...to engage them in imaginary conversation. This is further suggested by the fact that two decades before the commencement of Imaginary Conversations, Landor had unsuccessfully submitted a dialogue between William Grenville and Edmund Burke to The Morning Chronicle. However, such dialogues had been an established European genre with Classical precedents for some two centuries before he came to write his. Even as he wrote them, his friend Robert Southey was working on his own Colloquies (1829), a coincidence on which Landor remarked during the course of their correspondence.

As a keen Classicist, Landor would have been aware of the prior example of Lucian's Dialogues of the Dead and its revived influence on European literature. In fact, a new translation of the Greek work by William Tooke had appeared in 1820 and Landor was later to include a sceptical Lucian in debate with the dogmatic Christian Timotheus in his own Conversations. Recognising the debt, Henry Duff Traill later included a dialogue between Plato and Landor himself (who had no great opinion of the philosopher) in his The New Lucian (1884).

Lucian's work had been a cheerful and satirical deformation of Socratic dialogue, imagined as taking place among the inhabitants and personnel of the Greek Hades. Revived in the Renaissance, it served as the model for Giovanni Boccaccio, in whose De casibus virorum illustrium (The Downfall of the Famous), members of the 1st century Roman imperial clan quarrel over whose behaviour among them had been the most infamous. Later in France, Bernard Le Bovier de Fontenelle composed New Dialogues of the Dead (Nouveaux dialogues des morts, 1683) in which the exchange of ideas between a range of Classical and later personalities illustrate their relativity over time in a more concentrated Socratic form than Lucian's. He was followed by François Fénelon, whose Dialogues des Morts (1712) included a consideration of political themes as well. In their wake, dialogues of the dead spread as a genre across Europe.

In England there appeared a set of contemporary dialogues titled English Lucian in 1703, well before English translations of Fontenelle and Fénelon and George Lyttelton's elegant imitation of them in his own Dialogues of the Dead (1760). But by the time of the Asian contributions among the "Miscellaneous Conversations" in Landor's work, other models had offered themselves. In the case of the eight sections of "The Emperor of China and Tsing-ti", with their humorous comments on the idiosyncrasies of the time as viewed from the point of view of an outsider from another culture, they included such works as Lyttleton's Letters from a Persian in England, to his Friend at Ispahan (1735) and Oliver Goldsmith's Letters from a Citizen of the World to his Friends in the East (1760), themselves following previous French models. Landor's work, therefore, can be perceived as a prolongation and bringing to perfection of already established modes of contrasting ideas and personalities in a more immediate way than the formal essay.

== Interliterary mentions ==
Algernon Charles Swinburne concluded his essay on the author in the 1882 volume of the Encyclopaedia Britannica with the opinion that "the very finest flower of his dialogues is probably to be found in the single volume Imaginary Conversations of Greeks and Romans; his command of passion and pathos may be tested by its success in the distilled and concentrated tragedy of Tiberius and Vipsania, where for once he shows a quality more proper to romantic than classical imagination: the subtle and sublime and terrible power to enter the dark vestibule of distraction, to throw the whole force of his fancy, the whole fire of his spirit, into the shadowing passion (as Shakespeare calls it) of gradually imminent insanity. Yet, if this and all other studies from ancient history or legend could be subtracted from the volume of his work, enough would be left whereon to rest the foundation of a fame which time could not sensibly impair."

In section 92 of "The Gay Science" (1882), Friedrich Nietzsche declared that "I look only on Giacomo Leopardi, Prosper Merimée, Ralph Waldo Emerson and Walter Savage Landor, the author of Imaginary Conversations, as worthy to be called masters of prose."

In chapter 2 of Howards End (1910), Margaret Schlegel runs to comfort her brother Tibby, who is ill in bed with hay fever: "The only thing that made life worth living was the thought of Walter Savage Landor, from whose Imaginary Conversations she had promised to read at frequent intervals during that day.”

In Rudyard Kipling's account of "An English School" (1923), he mentions one boy who found in the library "a book called Imaginary Conversations which he did not understand, but it seemed to be a good thing to imitate."

== Bibliography ==
Colvin, Sidney. Landor, Macmillan & Co. 1881.
