= Wyndham William Knight =

English cricketer (1828–1918)

- Born: 5 December 1828; Chawton, Hampshire, England
- Died: 17 September 1918 (aged 89); Bilting, Kent, England
- Spouse: Henrietta Armstrong
- Relatives: Wyndham Charles Knight (grandson)

Wyndham William Knight (5 December 1828 – 17 September 1918), known in some sources as Wiliam Wyndham Knight, (Note: Knight is named Wiliam Wyndham in two cricket sources - CricInfo and CricketArchive both give him this name. In all other sources, including those associated with Kent County Cricket Club, Winchester College, the British Army, Kelly's Directory, his death notice in The Times and in genealogical sources, he is named Wyndham William.) was an English amateur cricketer who played in one first-class cricket match for Kent County Cricket Club in 1862.

== Life ==
Knight was born at Chawton in Hampshire in 1828 and educated at Winchester College. He is known to have played cricket twice for the amateur Gentlemen of Kent team in the 1850s before making his only first-class appearance for the county team in 1862 against Sussex. He was one of the founders of the Band of Brothers, an amateur cricket club closely associated with Kent.

Knight spent most of his adult life at Bilting House near Godmersham in Kent, though he also owned property in Hampshire.

In 1846 he was commissioned as a second lieutenant in the Rifle Brigade, serving in the regiment until 1854, commanding a company at the Battle of Boomplaats in South Africa in 1848 and rising to the rank of lieutenant. He later served with the Royal East Kent Yeomanry between 1856 and 1862, rising to the rank of captain.

He was a magistrate and a justice of the peace.

He married Henrietta Armstrong and had two children.

Knight died at Bilting in Kent in 1918 aged 89. His brother Philip, father Edward, (Note: Edward Knight was born Edward Austen in 1792 and was a nephew of Jane Austen.) and uncles George, Brook and Henry all played first-class cricket.

He was the father of Captain William Brodnax Knight, of the Queen's Bays, and the grandfather of Major-General Sir Wyndham Charles Knight, of the Indian Army.

== Bibliography ==
- Carlaw, Derek (2020). Kent County Cricketers, A to Z: Part One (1806–1914) (PDF). Cardiff: ACS.
