= George T. Knight (cricketer) =

English cricketer (1795–1867)

- Born: 22 November 1795; Goodnestone Park, Kent, England
- Died: 25 August 1867 (aged 71); Moorfields, Hereford
- Occupation: cricketer

George Thomas Knight (22 November 1795 – 25 August 1867) was an English amateur cricketer. He was a prominent member of Marylebone Cricket Club (MCC) who played a significant part in the introduction and legalisation of roundarm bowling between 1825 and 1835.

== Life ==
Knight was born at Goodnestone Park in Kent, the second son of Jane Austen's brother Edward Austen Knight. Knight's brothers, Edward, Henry and Brook, grandsons Edward and Lewis D'Aeth, and nephews Philip, Wyndham, and Gerald Portal were also cricketers.

Knight's cricket career spanned the 1820 to 1837 seasons. He made 23 known appearances in important matches as a right-arm fast roundarm bowler and a late order right-handed batsman and was an occasional wicketkeeper.

He married Countess Nelson, born Hilaire Barlow, daughter of Admiral Sir Robert Barlow and the widow of William Nelson, 1st Earl Nelson. He had no children and died in 1867 at Moorfields, Hereford.

== Bibliography ==
- Carlaw, Derek (2020). Kent County Cricketers, A to Z: Part One (1806–1914) (PDF). Cardiff: ACS.
