= Wyndham Knight =

Wyndham Knight may refer to

- Wyndham William Knight (1828–1918), an English cricketer
- Wyndham Charles Knight (1863–1942), an English soldier, grandson of the above
