= Wyndham (name) =

Wyndham is an English name. Notable people with the name include:

- Wyndham (surname), listing

== People with the given name ==
- Wyndham Albery (1882–1940), British politician and accountant
- Wyndham Childs (1876–1946), British Army officer
- Wyndham Clark (born 1993), American golfer
- Wyndham Cook (born 1943), Australian politician
- Wyndham Davies (1926–1984), British politician
- Wyndham Deedes (1883–1956), British Army officer and civil administrator
- Wyndham Dunstan (1861–1949), British chemist
- Wyndham Edwards (1892–1961), Welsh gymnast
- Wyndham Emery (1897–1969), Welsh rugby player
- Wyndham Evans (born 1951), Welsh footballer and manager
- Wyndham Evanson (1851–1934), England international rugby union player
- Wyndham Gittens (1885–1967), West Indian screenwriter
- Wyndham Goldie (1897–1957), English actor
- Wyndham Goold (1812–1854), British politician
- Wyndham Guise (1859–1934), British actor
- Wyndham Halswelle (1882–1915), Scottish athlete
- Wyndham Harding (1817–1855), English civil engineer and philanthropist
- Wyndham Hazelton (1894–1958), English cricketer
- Wyndham Hill-Smith (1909–1990), Australian cricketer and wine-maker
- Wyndham Knatchbull (1844–1917), British barrister and politician
- Wyndham Knatchbull (Arabic scholar) (1795 or 1796–1868), British clergyman and academic
- Wyndham Knatchbull-Hugessen, 3rd Baron Brabourne (1885–1915), British peer and serviceman
- Wyndham Knatchbull-Wyndham (1737–1763), British baronet and Whig politician
- Wyndham Charles Knight (1863–1942), British general officer
- Wyndham William Knight (1828–1918), English cricketer
- Wyndham Lathem (born 1974), American microbiologist and convicted murderer
- Wyndham Lewis (1882–1957), English author and artist
- Wyndham Lewis (politician) (1780–1838), British politician
- Wyndham Meredith Manning (1890–1967), South Carolina politician
- Wyndham Payne (1888–1974), English artist and illustrator
- Wyndham Portal, 1st Viscount Portal (1885–1949), British politician
- Wyndham Robertson (1803–1888), American politician
- Wyndham Standing (1880–1963), English actor
- Wyndham St. John (1959–2023), Canadian equestrian
- Wyndham Thomas (1911–1992), English cricketer
- Wyndham Wise, Canadian film historian and critic

== See also ==
- Wyndham baronets
