= Edward Knight (cricketer) =

English cricketer

- Born: 10 May 1794; Godmersham, Kent, England
- Died: 5 November 1879 (aged 85); Alton, Hampshire
- Occupation: cricketer
- Spouses: Mary Dorothea Knatchbull (m. 1826; died 1838) Adela Portal (m. 1840; died 1870)
- Relatives: George T. Knight (brother); Henry Knight (brother); Brook Knight (brother); Gerald Portal (nephew)

Edward Knight (born Edward Austen, 10 May 1794 – 5 November 1879) was the nephew of Jane Austen and an English amateur cricketer who played from 1822 to 1828.

== Biography ==
He was born in Godmersham, Kent, the eldest son of Edward Austen Knight, who had added the additional surname of Knight in 1812 when he inherited the Chawton House estate from Thomas Knight. Edward junior inherited Chawton on his father's death in 1852. Knight's brothers, George Thomas, Henry and Brook, sons Philip and Wyndham and nephew Gerald Portal all played.

He was a deputy lieutenant and justice of the peace for Hampshire and served as High Sheriff of Hampshire for 1823–24.

He was associated with Kent and Marylebone Cricket Club (MCC). He made 13 known appearances in important matches, including 3 for the Gentlemen.

He died in 1879 at Alton, Hampshire, and was buried in St Nicholas churchyard, Chawton.

== Family ==
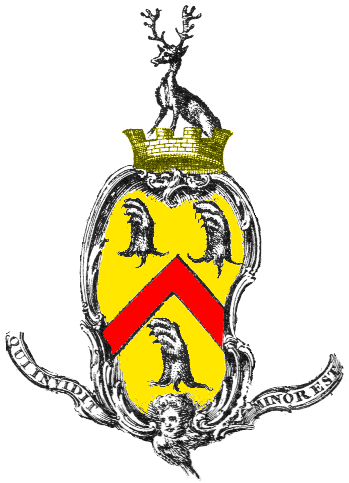
Coat of Arms of the Austen family

He had married firstly Mary Dorothea Knatchbull, the daughter of Sir Edward Knatchbull, Bt of Mersham Hatch, Kent. Since Sir Edward was married to Knight's sister Fanny, there was something of a scandal when the couple eloped. His second wife was Adela (d.1870), the eldest daughter of John Portal of Hampshire.

He had the following children: With Mary Dorothea Knatchbull, he had the following children:

- Edward Lewkenor (1827–1838);
- William Wyndham (1828–1918);
- Christina Arabella (1830–1844);
- Georgina E., (1832–1864);
- Philip H., (1835–1882);
- C. Ernest (1836–1855);
- William Brodnax (1838–1896).

With Adela Portal, he had the following children:

- Edward (1843–1844);
- Elizabeth Adela (1841–1896);
- Montagu George (1844–1914);
- Charles Edward (1846–1912);
- Henry John (1848–1896);
- Adela Louisa Cassandra (1849– );
- Adela M. M., (1852–12);
- Helen Adela (1853– );
- Ethel Adela (1853–1913).

== Bibliography ==
- Carlaw, Derek (2020). Kent County Cricketers, A to Z: Part One (1806–1914) (PDF). Cardiff: ACS.
- Haygarth, Arthur (1996) [1862]. Scores & Biographies, Volume 1 (1744–1826). Kennington: Frederick Lillywhite. ISBN 978-19-00592-23-9.
- Haygarth, Arthur (1997) [1862]. Scores & Biographies, Volume 2 (1827–1840). Kennington: Frederick Lillywhite. ISBN 978-19-00592-23-9.
