= Philip Knight (cricketer) =

English soldier, landowner, and cricketer

- Born: 25 August 1835
- Died: 4 January 1882 (aged 46)
- Education: Harrow School; Trinity College, Cambridge
- Occupations: soldier landowner cricketer

Philip Henry Knight (25 August 1835 – 4 January 1882) was an English soldier, landowner and cricketer who played first-class cricket in a few matches for Cambridge University, the Marylebone Cricket Club and other amateur sides between 1853 and 1864. He was born at Chawton House, Alton, Hampshire and died there as well.

== Biography ==
Knight was the son of Edward Knight, who was himself the eldest son of Edward Austen Knight, the brother of the novelist Jane Austen who changed his own family name to "Knight" in 1812 in order to inherit substantial landholdings in Kent and Hampshire. Edward Knight and three of his brothers (George, Henry and Brook) played first-class cricket; one of Philip Knight's brothers and several brothers-in-law also played.

Philip Knight was educated at Harrow School and at Trinity College, Cambridge, though there is no record that he completed a degree there. After Cambridge, he joined the Royal Welch Fusiliers, rising to the rank of major and seeing service in the Indian Mutiny and in the siege and capture of Lucknow. In 1865, he was adjutant of the East Kent Militia.

== Cricket career ==
At Harrow as a cricketer he was the outstanding batsman in each innings in the 1853 Eton v Harrow cricket match which his side won narrowly. Only three weeks after that, he played his first first-class match: a gentlemanly affair involving the Gentlemen of Kent side against the Gentlemen of England. In 1854, he played in both matches between Cambridge University and the MCC, once for each side, but made little impact, and was not picked for the university again; the rest of his first-class cricket came in amateur games in that 1854 season, except for his final two appearances for MCC and the Gentlemen of Kent 10 years later in 1864.
