= Thomas Knight (MP for Canterbury) =

English landowner and Tory politician

Thomas Knight (c. 1701 – 26 February 1781), previously Thomas Brodnax (1701–1726) and Thomas May (1727–1738), of Godmersham Park, Kent, was an English landowner and Tory politician who sat in the House of Commons from 1734 to 1741.

== Early life ==
Brodnax's Name Act 1726
- Act of Parliament
- Parliament of Great Britain
- Long title: An Act to enable Thomas Brodnax Esquire, and the Heirs and Issue of his Body, to take and use the Surname of May.
- Citation: 13 Geo. 1. c. 4 Pr.
- Territorial extent: Great Britain

Dates
- Royal assent: 24 March 1727
- Commencement: 17 January 1727 (Note: Start of session.)

Status: Current legislation

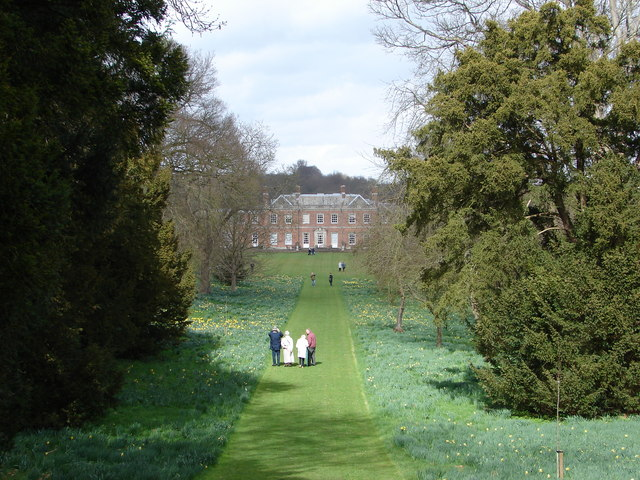
Godmersham Hall

Knight was the son of William Brodnax of Godmersham, Kent, and his second wife Anne May, daughter of Christopher May of Greenwich. He matriculated at Balliol College, Oxford on 2 June 1720, aged 18. In 1726, he succeeded his father in the family estate at Godmersham. Also in 1726, he succeeded his cousin Dame Anne May in the May estates at Rawmere, Sussex, and changed his name by a private act of Parliament, Brodnax's Name Act 1726 (13 Geo. 1. c. 4 Pr.) to May. He married Jane Monke, daughter of William Monke of Buckingham House, Shoreham, at Gray's Inn Chapel on 11 July 1729. In 1732 he rebuilt the house at Godmersham. He served as Sheriff of Kent for 1729.

== Career ==
As May, he was elected Tory Member of Parliament (MP) for Canterbury at the 1734 British general election. He voted with the Opposition and did not stand at the 1741 British general election. In 1738, he changed his name by Act of Parliament to Knight after inheriting the Chawton estates under the will of Elizabeth Knight, widow of Bulstrode Knight (who was her second husband, her first being William Woodward Knight. of Dean).

== Later life and legacy ==
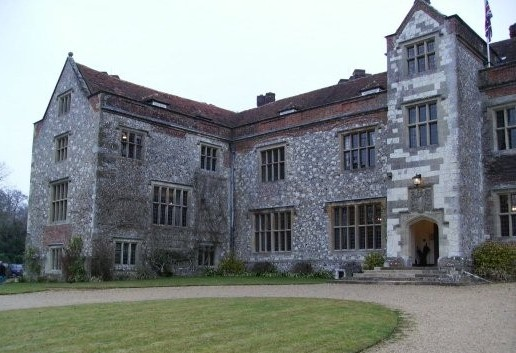
Chawton House, January 2008

Knight retired to his seat at Godmersham and in 1742 he enclosed a park round it. He died at Godmersham in 1781. Although he and his wife had five sons and five daughters, only three daughters and a son survived. His son Thomas inherited the estate and was later MP for Kent.

Knight was described as "a gentleman, whose eminent worth is still remembered by many now living; whose high character for upright conduct and integrity, rendered his life as honorable as it was good, and caused his death to be lamented by every one as a public loss".

== Notes ==
Parliament of Great Britain
Preceded by Sir William Hardres, Bt; Sir Thomas Hales, Bt	Member of Parliament for Canterbury; 1734–1741; With: Sir William Hardres, Bt 1734–1735; Sir Thomas Hales, Bt 1735–1741	Succeeded by Thomas Watson; Thomas Best
