= Godmersham Park =

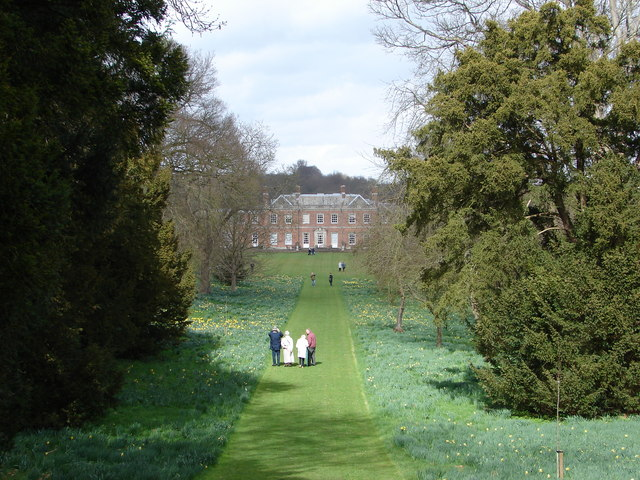
- Godmersham Park
- Interactive map of the Godmersham Park area
- Alternative names: Godmersham Hall

General information
- Type: House
- Architectural style: Georgian
- Classification: Grade I listed
- Location: Godmersham, Kent, United Kingdom
- Coordinates: 51°13′14″N 0°57′01″E; TR 0612 5100
- Current tenants: Association of British Dispensing Opticians
- Completed: 1732
- Renovated: 1780, 1852, 1935

Height
- Roof: Slate

Technical details
- Material: Brick
- Floor count: Two

Design and construction
- Known for: Connections to Jane Austen

Godmersham Park is a Grade I listed house in Godmersham in the English county of Kent. The house is on the edge of the North Downs between Ashford and Canterbury. It has associations with the writer Jane Austen, and is depicted on the new Bank of England £10 note issued in 2017. It is now home to the Association of British Dispensing Opticians.

== Description ==
Godmersham Park is a two-storey house in the Palladian style. Built of red brick, the main block is of seven bays, the central three being recessed. The north front is of Thomas May's time, while the south facade was constructed by Walter Sarel for the Trittons in the 1930s, in a complementary style. During this reconstruction, Sarel also turned the bricks on the north front, which had been painted in the 19th century, to restore the original 18th century appearance. The two wings post-date May's frontage, being of the late 18th century. The roof is of slate with a parapet, and the house is of two storeys, with cellars and attics. The interior contains two rooms which retain the original decorative schemes from May's time, the drawing room and the hall. The rest date from Sarel's remodelling. Both of May's rooms are embellished with ornate plasterwork, the hall also having a chimneypiece by John Michael Rysbrack.

== History ==
Godmersham Park was built in 1732 for Thomas May, replacing an earlier Elizabethan house, Ford House, owned by the Brodnax family. In 1742, by which time May had changed his name to Knight, he enclosed a park around the estate, which was then known as Ford Park. The wings were added in 1780. Knight died in 1781 and the estate was inherited by his son Thomas. Following his death in 1794, the house was inherited by Edward Austen, brother of Jane Austen. He was a distant cousin of the Knights and had been adopted by them in the early 1780s. Following the death of his adoptive mother Catherine in 1812, Austen changed his name to Knight.

Jane Austen was a regular visitor between 1798 and 1813. Mansfield Park is said to be based on Godmersham Park. In 1852, the property passed to Knight's son, Edward Knight. He remodelled the south front to designs by William Burn before selling it to John Cunliffe Lister Kay in 1874,(later the Burn additions were swept away in the 1930s by Robert Tritton). During the First World War, an airship was stationed at Godmersham Park, which served as a sub-station of RNAS Capel.

Godmersham Park passed to John Cunliffe Lister, 3rd Baron Masham, who sold it in 1921 to William Legge, 6th Earl of Dartmouth. In 1935, Godmersham Park was sold to Mr and Mrs Robert Tritton, who restored the house. Walter Sarel remodelled the building, much of the interior being replaced using genuine eighteenth-century features recovered from buildings across England. Norah Lindsay advised on restoration of the walled gardens. The house became a Grade I listed building in 1952, and the gardens were separately listed in Grade II* in 1986, with other garden features listed as Grade II.

Robert Tritton died in 1957. Following the death of Elsie Tritton in 1983, the contents of the house were sold by Christie, Manson & Wood and Godmersham Park was sold to John Bernard Sunley. The estate management company Sunley Farms Limited, which is 100% owned by Sunciera Holdings Corporation in Panama, is the owner of Godmersham Park.

In 2001, Godmersham Park became the home of the Association of British Dispensing Opticians, in which capacity it is used as a training college. The Godmersham Park Heritage Centre contains information and artifacts relating to the Godmersham Park Estate, as well as the parishes of Godmersham and Crundale.

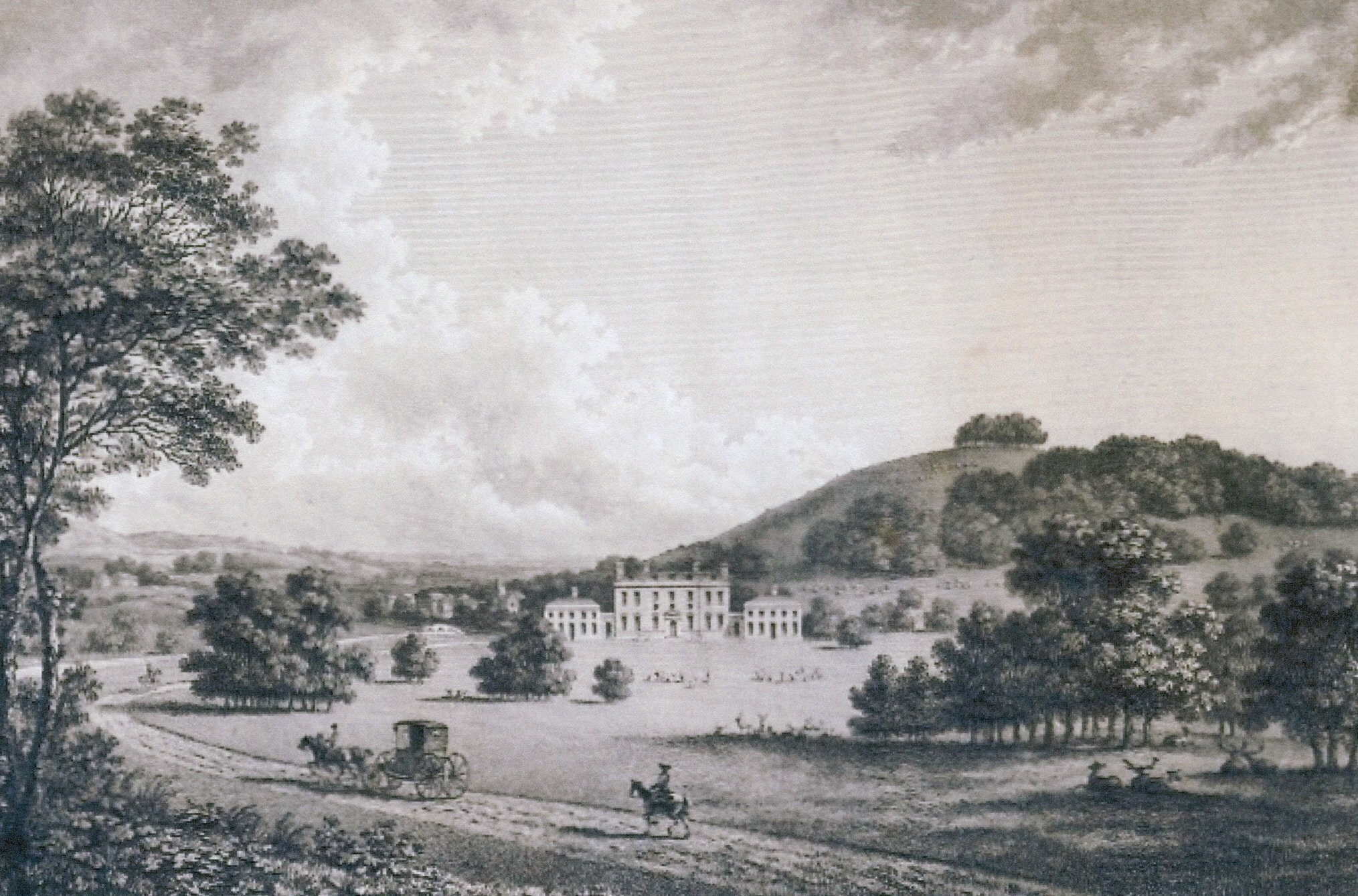
1779, in the time of Edward Austen

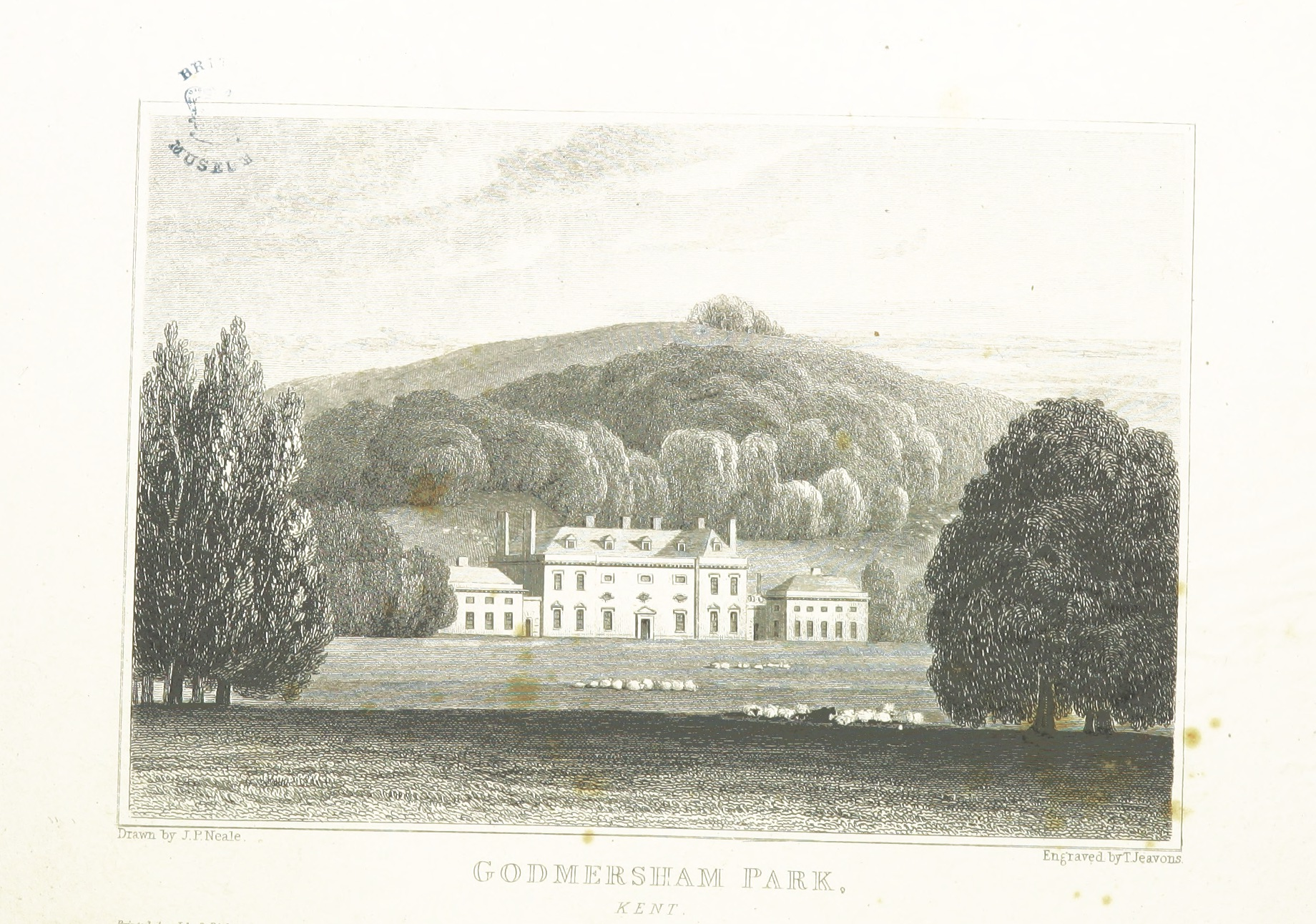
1826

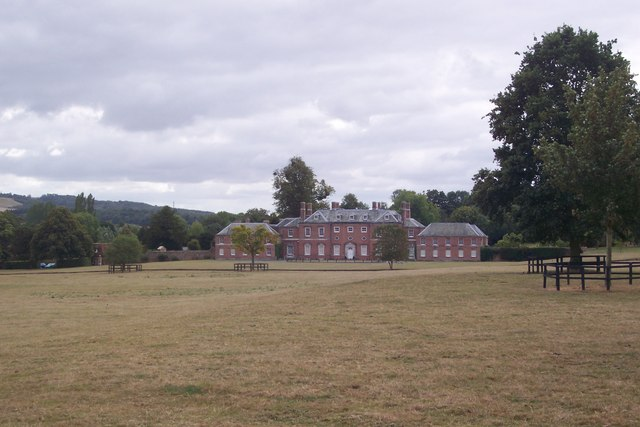
2009

== In fiction ==
Gill Hornby's 2022 novel Godmersham Park is based on events at the house while it was occupied by the Austen family.
