= Association of British Dispensing Opticians =

British professional association for opticians

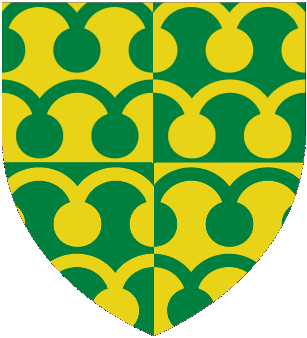
- Abbreviation: ABDO
- Formation: 1986
- Type: Professional body
- Legal status: Non-profit company
- Purpose: Dispensing opticians in the UK
- Headquarters: Bayswater; London, W2
- Region served: UK
- Members: 5,300 British dispensing opticians
- General Secretary: Alistair Bridge
- Main organ: ABDO Board (President - Kevin Gutsell FBDO (Hons) SLD)
- Website: ABDO

The Association of British Dispensing Opticians (ABDO) is the main professional association for opticians in the UK.

== History ==
ABDO was formed in 1986 from the merger of the Association of Dispensing Opticians and the Faculty of Dispensing Opticians, following the Health and Social Security Act of 1984. The profession of dispensing opticians has been regulated voluntarily since 1926 and, as a statutory profession, by the Opticians Act since 1958. Since such time the conduct of dispensing opticians has thus been regulated partly by legal provisions, by advice given by the General Optical Council, and by ABDO’s own Advice to Fellows.

The General Optical Council was formed by the Opticians Act 1958, to make the British optician profession statutorily protected.

== Structure ==
ABDO currently has 9,000 members and represents over 6.000 qualified dispensing opticians in the UK. It also has 500 members overseas, 500 associate members and approximately 1,800 student members worldwide.

The Association is governed by a board of directors, which consists of nine full members of the Association elected by members’ ballot. The board has a non-voting academic adviser.

The board is served by the secretariat of the Association, headed by the general secretary Alistair Bridge.

The president and vice president are elected by the board from amongst its number. The term of office, for both the president and vice president, is normally two years.

ABDO is divided into the following regions within the UK: •ABDO London •ABDO Midlands •ABDO North of England •ABDO South •ABDO Northern Ireland •ABDO Scotland •ABDO Wales

Within each region, a Regional Lead is supported by Sub Regional Leads who between them look after the interests of ABDO members at a local level.

The Association's registered office is at 199, Gloucester Terrace, London W2 6LD. It is situated off Bishops Bridge Road (A4206), between Royal Oak tube station, to the west, and London Paddington station, to the east. It is opposite the Hallfield Estate.

ABDO College was established at Godmersham Park, Godmersham, Kent, in 2001, on the A28. Also based at the ABDO's headquarters are the Federation of Manufacturing Opticians and Federation of Ophthalmic & Dispensing Opticians. It has a publishing division at Crowborough in East Sussex.

== Optician training in the UK ==
Training to become an optician is available at British universities.

- ABDO College
- Anglia Ruskin University
- Aston University
- Bradford College
- City University London
- Glasgow Caledonian University
- University of Manchester

University of Central Lancashire

== Function ==
ABDO represents the interests at a national level of British dispensing opticians. It is one of the five representative bodies that make up the Optical Confederation.

== Arms ==
Coat of arms of Association of British Dispensing Opticians

Crest
Upon a helm on a wreath Or and Sable a Lynx statant and in trian aspect Argent winged Or resting the dexter forepaw on a prism proper. Mantled Sable doubled Gold.
Escutcheon
Quarterly Or and Sable four Barrulets wavy surmounted in the troughs of each and conjoined to a roundel countercharged
Supporters
On either side upon a prism Proper a Falcon reguardant Argent gorged with a Crown Rayonny Gold.
