= Chawton =

Village and parish in Hampshire, England

Coordinates: 51.13271°N 0.98873°W

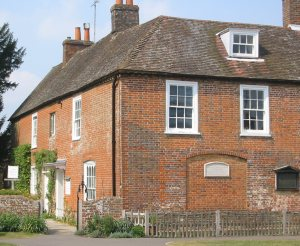
- Jane Austen's House

- Location within Hampshire
- Population: 445 (2011 Census)
- OS grid reference: SU710373
- Civil parish: Chawton
- District: East Hampshire
- Shire county: Hampshire
- Region: South East
- Country: England
- Sovereign state: United Kingdom
- Post town: ALTON
- Postcode district: GU34
- Dialling code: 01420
- Police: Hampshire and Isle of Wight
- Fire: Hampshire and Isle of Wight
- Ambulance: South Central
- UK Parliament: East Hampshire

Chawton is a village and civil parish in the East Hampshire district of Hampshire, England. The village lies within the South Downs National Park and is famous as the home of Jane Austen for the last eight years of her life.

== History ==
Chawton's recorded history begins in the Domesday survey of 1086. The village held nineteen free residents, eight smallholders, six slaves (part of the sixty-seven slaves in the area from Alresford to the ridge parishes) and woodland with fifty pigs. In the 13th century, there was a royal manor house. The descendants of John Knight, who built the present Chawton House at the time of the Armada (1588), added to it and modified the landscape in ways that reflect changes in politics, religion and taste. One of those descendants was Elizabeth Knight, whose progresses were marked by the ringing of church bells and whose two husbands both had to adopt her surname. Later in the 18th century, Jane Austen's brother Edward Austen Knight (who had been adopted by the Knights) succeeded, and in 1809 was able to move his mother and sisters to a cottage in the village.

Chawton never developed into a settlement of substance, ‘possibly because the lords of the manor wished to keep the area for themselves’. Chawton’s private parliamentary enclosure took place in 1740-1 when a bad harvest followed a severe winter and eighteen food riots were recorded over large parts of the country. However, the Chawton act was mostly about sheep and its private act was merely the confirmation of an agreement already made. There is no mention at Chawton of encroachments, peasants’ cottages, or peasants’ rights of common forage and the rest. This was entirely an arrangement between the owners of the land for their individual benefit. From lists in Leigh’s book of Chawton Manor, one might have expected over thirty families to have held an interest, but all but one were already gone, not just from the Commons, but, soon, from the village entirely. ‘A thick cultural and social wedge was inserted between the improving husbandmen, the better sort of the parish, and the poor.’

Enclosure was nothing new in Chawton. In 1605, a court held by John Knight recognised that for the last thirty or forty years a ‘great part’ of the commons had been enclosed by tenants with the consent of the lord. However, these tenants still kept the same number of sheep on the reduced common land to everyone’s detriment. The enclosed lands at Chawton in 1740 came from the 312 acres of Common and from 309 acres made up of seven common fields: Ridgefield, Southfield, Northfield, Upper and Lower Eastfield, Whitedown and Winstreetfield. The lord, Thomas Knight, newly in position, did very well. His existing local estate already comprised fifteen houses and 1,569 acres: 734 of arable land, 108 of pasture, 56 meadow, 615 woodland and 55 rough heath. Now, through enclosure, he added 156 acres from the common and 143 acres from the common fields, 48 per cent of the available total, and almost 2,000 acres altogether in Hampshire. Knight’s allotment was increased by the herbage of all the highways on the Common, and, because he was the lord, ‘free liberty’ by June 1742 to ‘sell, cut down, grub up, take, cart, and carry away’ all the timber trees, pollard trees, bushes and wood, anywhere on the Common for which his workmen could enter any allotment at any time.

== Visitor attractions ==
=== Chawton Cottage ===
Chawton Cottage, Jane Austen's house and garden are open to the public.

=== Chawton House ===
Chawton House, the 400-year-old Grade II* listed Elizabethan manor house that once belonged to Jane Austen's brother and 275 acres (1.11 km^{2}) of land, has been restored as part of a major international project to establish the new Centre for the Study of Early Women's Writing, 1600–1830. It houses a collection of over 9,000 volumes, together with some related manuscripts. Visitors can see the relationship between the library, the house, the estate and a working farm of the 18th and early 19th centuries.

In 1992 a 125-year lease on the house was purchased for £1.25 million by a foundation established by Sandra Lerner, co-founder of Cisco Systems.

=== St Nicholas' Church ===
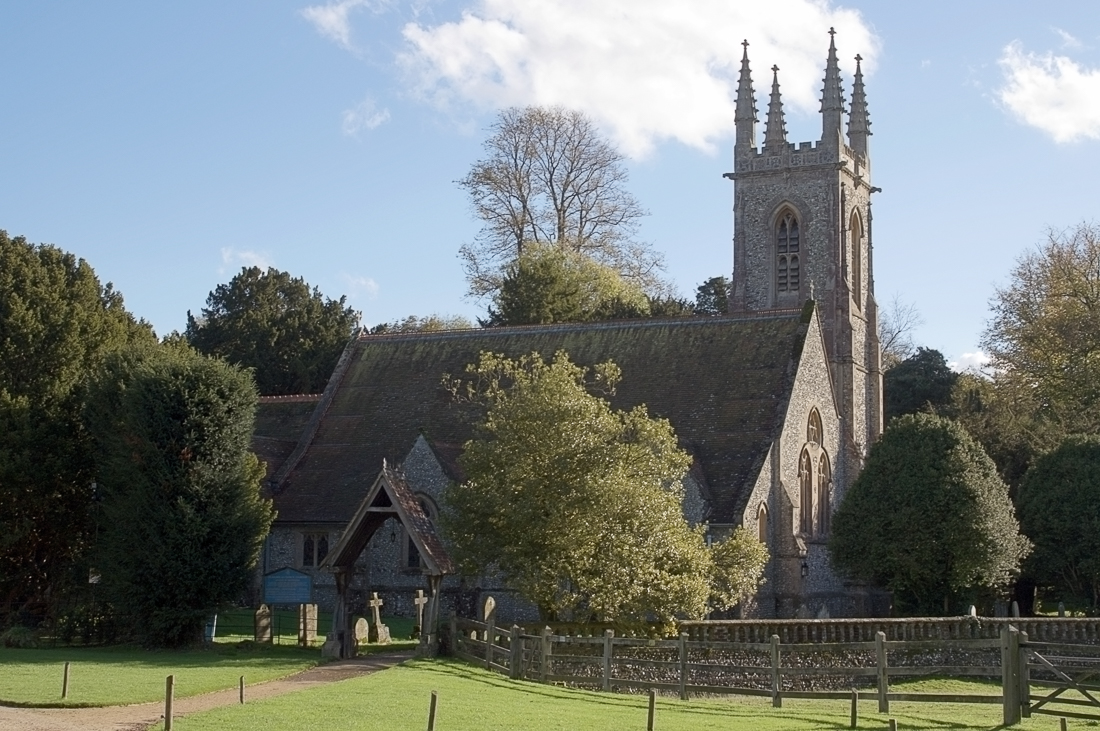
St Nicholas Church Chawton – Jane Austen's Parish Church and the burial place of her mother and sister.

Chawton has a single church, St Nicholas. A church has stood on the site in Chawton since at least 1270 when it was mentioned in a diocesan document. The church suffered a disastrous fire in 1871 which destroyed all but the chancel. The rebuilt church was designed by Sir Arthur Blomfield and is now listed Grade 2*.

The churchyard was reserved for burial for the Knight family, and the graves include that of Jane Austen's mother and sister, both called Cassandra.

Inside the tower are a total of eight bells, six of which were cast in 2009 by the firm Taylors, Eayre & Smith at Loughborough Bellfoundry in Leicestershire, and these form a ring of bells for traditional English change ringing. These replaced an earlier ring of bells, two of which remain in the tower for chiming.

== Services ==
Chawton C of E Primary School is the only school in Chawton. It is within the Diocese of Winchester and accepts children from ages four to eleven, and has close ties with St Nicholas's church. There has been a school on the site since about 1840, and the site sits opposite the village green and cricket field.

On Winchester Road, which runs through the village, there is a tea shop and small shop opposite Jane Austen's house called Cassandra's Cup, which is named after Jane Austen's sister. Just down the road from this is a Fuller's pub called The Greyfriar which has an oak beamed traditional bar, a secluded beer garden and a large car park. Also on Winchester Road is the Village Hall.

Adjacent to Gosport Road lies a green containing a cricket pitch and the home of Chawton Cricket Club, a newly refurbished playground and a set of allotments.

=== Transport ===
Chawton has two road exits, one leading to a roundabout connected to the A31 and the A32, and the other to the A339/B3006 Selborne Road.

The nearest railway station is 1.7 miles (2.7 km) northeast of the village, at Alton.
