= Thomas Knight (MP for Kent) =

English politician

Thomas Knight (15 May 1735 – 23 October 1794) was an English politician who sat in the House of Commons in two periods between 1761 and 1780.

Knight was the son of Thomas Knight (previously known as Brodnax and May) of Godmersham and his wife Jane Monke.

In 1761, Knight was elected Member of Parliament (MP) for New Romney and held the seat to 1768. In 1774 he was elected MP for Kent and held the seat until 1780.

Knight succeeded to his father's estates in 1781, and greatly improved the seat and park of Godmersham.

Knight died aged 59.

Knight married Catherine Knatchbull, daughter of Dr. Wadham Knatchbull, prebendary of Durham. They had no children and by his will he gave Godmersham Park and the lands belonging to it, to his widow Mrs. Catherine Knight, for her life, with remainder to Edward Austen of Rolling Place. Austen, who took the name Knight, was the brother of author Jane Austen.

Parliament of Great Britain
Preceded by Rose Fuller; Sir Francis Dashwood	Member of Parliament for New Romney; 1761–1768; With: Sir Edward Dering, Bt	Succeeded by Sir Edward Dering, Bt; Richard Jackson
Preceded by Sir Brook Bridges, Bt; Sir Charles Farnaby-Radcliffe, Bt	Member of Parliament for Kent; 1774–1780; With: Hon. Charles Marsham	Succeeded by Hon. Charles Marsham; Filmer Honywood
