= Lewis D'Aeth =

English cricketer and British Army officer

Personal information
- Full name: Lewis Narbrough Hughes D'Aeth
- Born: 13 March 1858; Knowlton, Kent, England
- Died: 21 October 1920 (aged 62); Mark Cross, Sussex, England
- Batting: Unknown
- Relatives: Edward D'Aeth (brother); Henry Knight (grandfather)

Domestic team information
- Years: Team
- 1894: Marylebone Cricket Club

Career statistics
Competition	First-class
Matches	1
Runs scored	0
Batting average	0.00
100s/50s	–/–
Top score	0
Catches/stumpings	–/–
- Source: Cricinfo, 6 October 2021

Lewis Narbrough Hughes D'Aeth JP (13 March 1858 — 21 October 1920) was an English first-class cricketer and British Army officer.

The son of Narborough Hughes D'Aeth, he was born at Knowlton Court in Kent in March 1858. D'Aeth was commissioned as an ensign in the Kent Militia Artillery in June 1876. He was transferred to the Royal Scots Fusiliers in February 1879 with the rank of second lieutenant, with promotion to captain following in July 1887. He retired from regular service the following year and was appointed to the Royal Fusiliers militia. D'Aeth later made a single appearance in first-class cricket for the Marylebone Cricket Club (MCC) against Leicestershire at Lord's in 1894. He was dismissed twice in the match without scoring by George Walton. D'Aeth was also a prominent figure in Kent cricket.

He resigned his commission from the Royal Fusiliers militia in May 1898, at which point he was made an honorary major. A justice of the peace for Kent, D'Aeth died from heart failure at Knewe Lodge in Mark Cross, Sussex in October 1920. His brother Edward and grandfather Henry Knight both played first-class cricket.
