= Leonard Bosack =

American businessman, co-founder of Cisco Systems

- Born: 1952 (age 73–74); Pennsylvania, U.S.
- Education: University of Pennsylvania; Stanford University
- Known for: Co-Founder of Cisco Systems
- Spouse: Sandy Lerner (divorced)

Leonard X. Bosack (born 1952) is a co-founder of Cisco Systems, an American-based multinational corporation that designs and sells consumer electronics, networking and communications technology, and services. His net worth is approximately $200 million. He was awarded the Computer Entrepreneur Award in 2009 for co-founding Cisco Systems and pioneering and advancing the commercialization of routing technology and the profound changes this technology enabled in the computer industry.

He is largely responsible for pioneering the widespread commercialization of local area network (LAN) technology to connect geographically disparate computers over a multiprotocol router system, which was an unheard-of technology at the time. In 1990, Cisco's management fired Cisco co-founder Sandy Lerner and Bosack resigned. As of 2010, Bosack was the CEO of XKL LLC, a privately funded engineering company which explores and develops optical networks for data communications.

== Background ==
Born in Pennsylvania in 1952 to Polish Catholic family, Bosack graduated from La Salle College High School in 1969. In 1973, Bosack graduated from the University of Pennsylvania School of Engineering and Applied Science, and joined the Digital Equipment Corporation (DEC) as a hardware engineer. In 1979, he was accepted into Stanford University, and began to study computer science. During his time at Stanford, he was credited for becoming a support engineer for a 1981 project to connect all of Stanford's mainframes, minis, LISP machines, and Altos.

His contribution was to work on the network router that allowed the computer network under his management to share data from the Computer Science Lab with the Stanford Graduate School of Business' network. He met his wife Sandra Lerner at Stanford, where she was the manager of the Business School lab, and the couple married in 1980. Together in 1984, they started Cisco in Menlo Park.

== Cisco ==
In 1984, Bosack co-founded Cisco Systems with his then partner (and now ex-wife) Sandy Lerner. Their aim was to commercialize the Advanced Gateway Server. The Advanced Gateway Server was a revised version of the Stanford router built by William Yeager and Andy Bechtolsheim. Bosack and Lerner designed and built routers in their house, and experimented using Stanford's network. Initially, Bosack and Lerner went to Stanford with a proposition to start building and selling the routers, but the school refused. It was then that they founded their own company, and named it "Cisco," taken from the name of nearby San Francisco. It is widely reported that Lerner and Bosack designed the first router so that they could connect the incompatible computer systems of the Stanford offices they were working in so that they could send letters to each other. However, this is an untrue legend.

Cisco's product was developed in their garage and was sold beginning in 1986 by word of mouth. In their first month alone, Cisco was able to land contracts worth more than $200,000. The company produced revolutionary technology such as the first multiport router-specific line cards and sophisticated routing protocols, giving them domination over the market-place. Cisco went public in 1990, the same year that Bosack resigned. Bosack and Lerner walked away from Cisco with $170 million after being forced out by the professional managers the firm's venture capitalists brought in. Bosack and Lerner divorced in the early 1990s.

In 1996, Cisco's revenues amounted to $5.4 billion, making it one of Silicon Valley's biggest success stories. In 1998, the company was valued at over $6 billion and controlled over three-quarters of the router business.

== Achievements ==
Along with co-founding Cisco Systems, Bosack is largely responsible for first pioneering the widespread commercialization of local area network (LAN). He and his fellow staff members at Stanford were able to successfully link the university's 5,000 computers across a 16-square-mile (41 km^{2}) campus area. This contribution is significant in its context because, at that time, technology like that which LAN used was unheard of. Their challenge had been to overcome incompatibility issues, in order to create the first true LAN system.

Bosack has also held significant technical leadership roles at AT&T Bell Labs and the Digital Equipment Corporation. After earning his master's degree in computer science from Stanford University, he became Director of Computer Facilities for the university's Department of Computer Science. He became a key contributor to the emerging ARPAnet, which was the beginning of today's Internet.

Bosack's most recent technological advancements include his creation of new in-line fiber optic amplification systems that are capable of achieving unprecedented data transmission latency speeds of 6.071 milliseconds (fiber plus equipment latency, fiber latency alone would be at least 4.106 milliseconds based on the speed of light) over 1231 kilometers of fiber, which is roughly the distance between Chicago and New York City. Bosack was inspired by his belief that by leveraging the inherent, but often untapped, physics of fiber optic components, data transmission speeds can be increased with devices that use less power, less space and require less cooling.

== Charity ==
Together, Bosack and Lerner have a charitable foundation and trust funded with 70% of the money from the sale of their Cisco stock. The foundation is recognized for financing a wide range of animal welfare and science projects, such as The Center for Conservation Biology at the University of Washington. It has also purchased an English manor house, Chawton House, once owned by Jane Austen's brother that has become a research center on 18th and 19th-century women writers.

== Controversy ==
In December 2001, a Mercury News article cited that a Stanford web site credits only Bosack and Lerner with developing the device that allowed computer networks to communicate intelligently with one another, despite Cisco spokeswoman Jeanette Gibson's claim that it was a group effort. Due to the nature of the collaboration, it is unable to be determined who did what during the process.
