= Chawton House =

Country house in Chawton, Hampshire, England

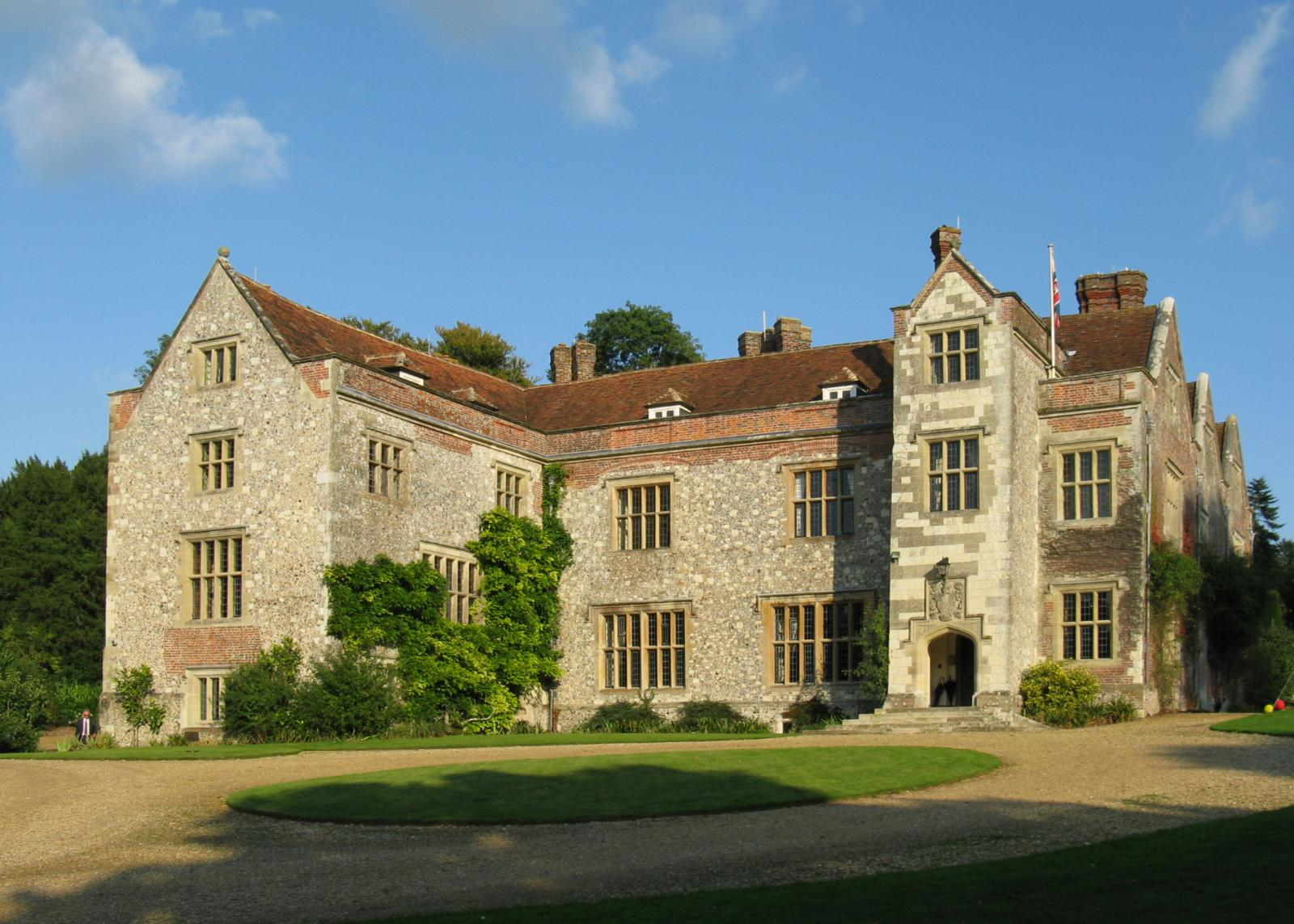
- Chawton House from the North West, 2008
- Interactive map of Chawton House
- 51.128305475522914°N 0.988142492436439°W
- Location: Chawton, England

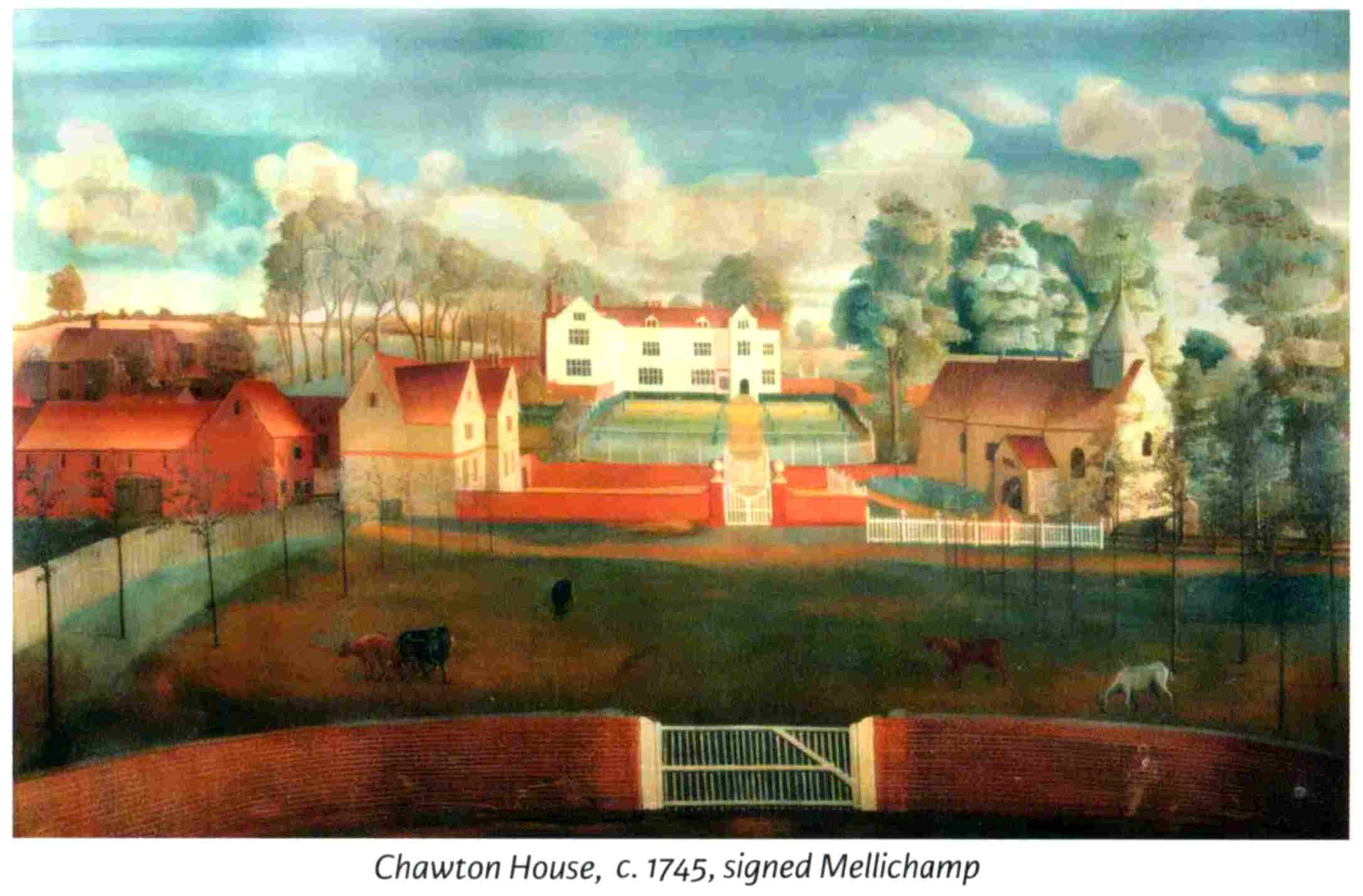
Chawton house and church 1745

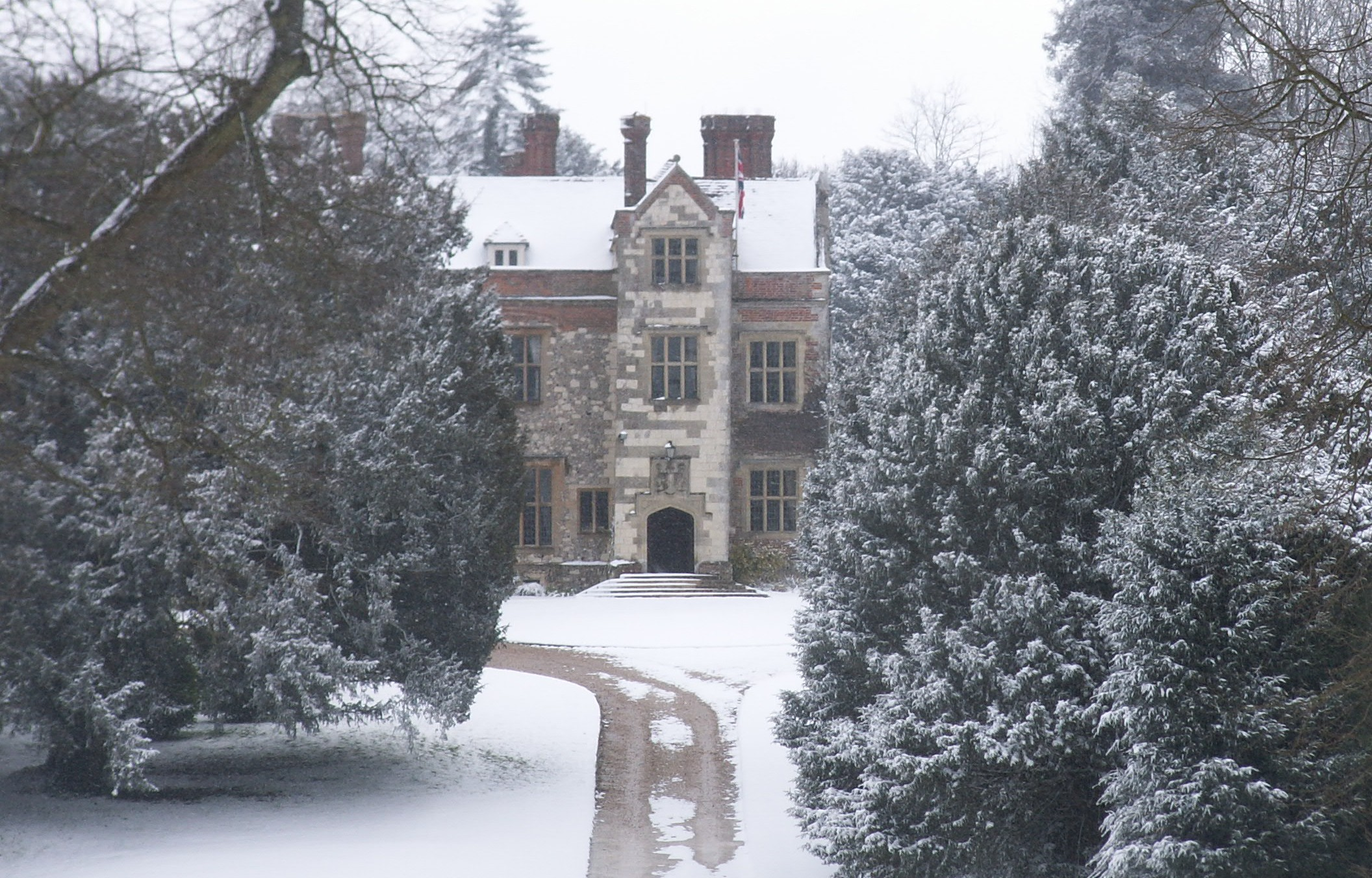
Chawton House in snow

Chawton House is a Grade II* listed manor house in Hampshire on the south side of Chawton village, near Alton, and the present building was started in 1580.

In the late 18th century it belonged to Edward Austen Knight, a wealthy brother of the novelist Jane Austen. Into the late 20th century, it remained in private ownership. It was then purchased by a charitable trust, extensively restored, and opened as a research centre.

The centre runs study programmes in association with the nearby University of Southampton. It houses a collection of over 9000 books and related manuscripts. It also houses the research library of 'The Centre for the Study of Early Women's Writing, 1600–1830'.

The house is open to visitors and library readers, for tours and during public events. The surrounding parkland to the south of the house is open at all times to walkers and nourishes a herd of sheep.

== The house ==
The present Chawton House was built starting in 1580 by John Knight, based on an older manor house. The estate had been owned by the Knight family since 1551. Alterations to the house were made in the 18th and 19th centuries.

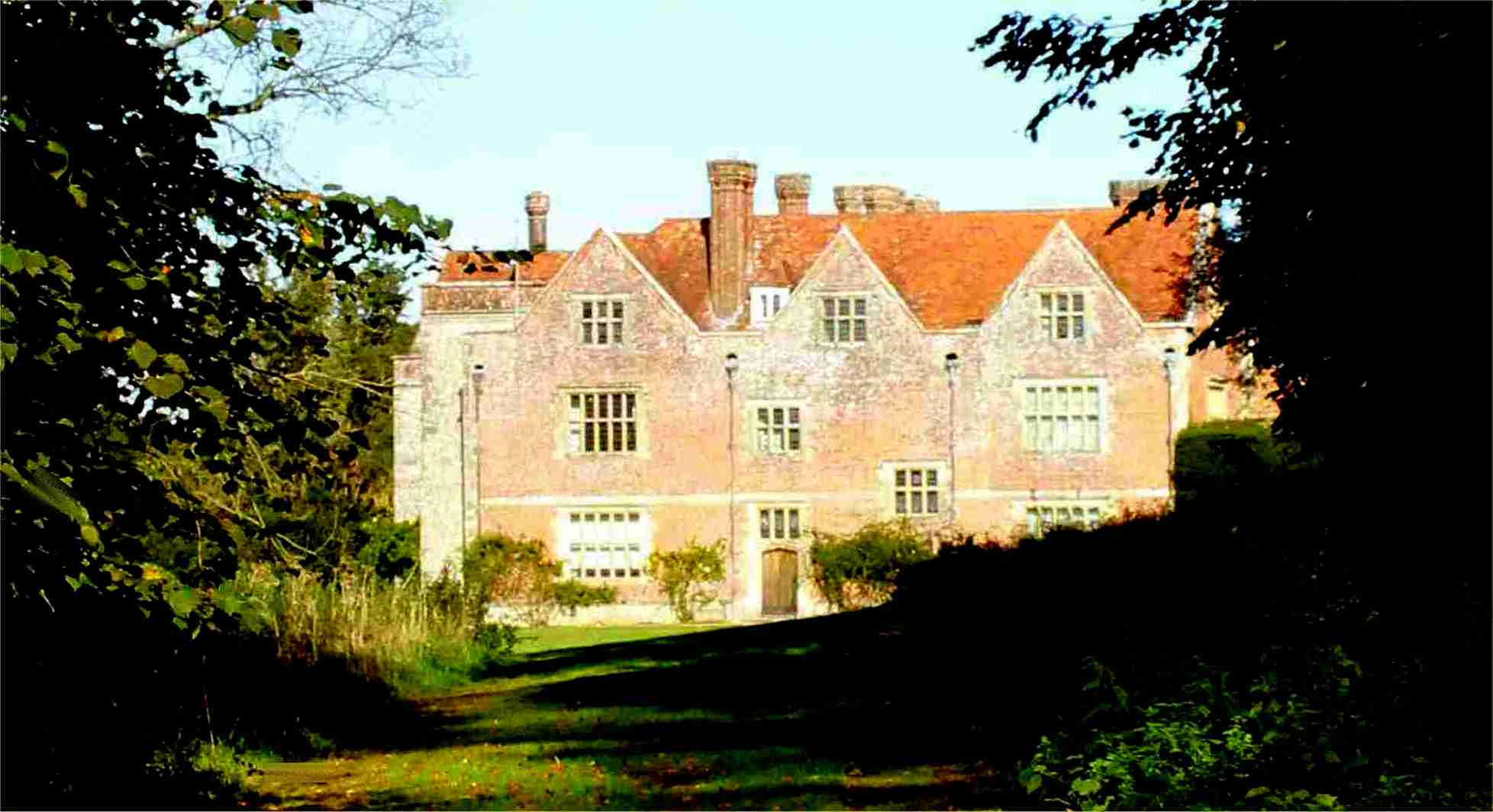
Chawton House from the South, 2023

The house is built of flint with stone dressings and a tiled roof. The South front has two main storeys with an attic and three gables that can be seen on the picture on the left.

John Knight served as MP for Lymington from 1593 to 1597 and was High Sheriff of Hampshire for 1609–10.

The house then passed down the family until the male line died out with the death of Sir Richard Knight. After this, it was passed to a relative by marriage, Richard Martin, who changed his name to Knight (possibly having to change his name to gain the inheritance).

It then passed to Thomas Brodnax, a relative, who did the same. His son, Thomas Knight, died childless and bequeathed the house to his relative (and adopted son) Edward Austen, the elder brother of Jane Austen, who also added Knight to his name.

The estate then continued in the Knight family until inherited by Richard Knight in 1987.

The house was then in poor condition and Richard Knight sold it in 1992.

The house is in 275 acres (1.11 km^{2}) of Hampshire countryside, and after extensive refurbishment is now open to visitors, for conferences, a venue for weddings, and has also been used for some films.

== The Church ==
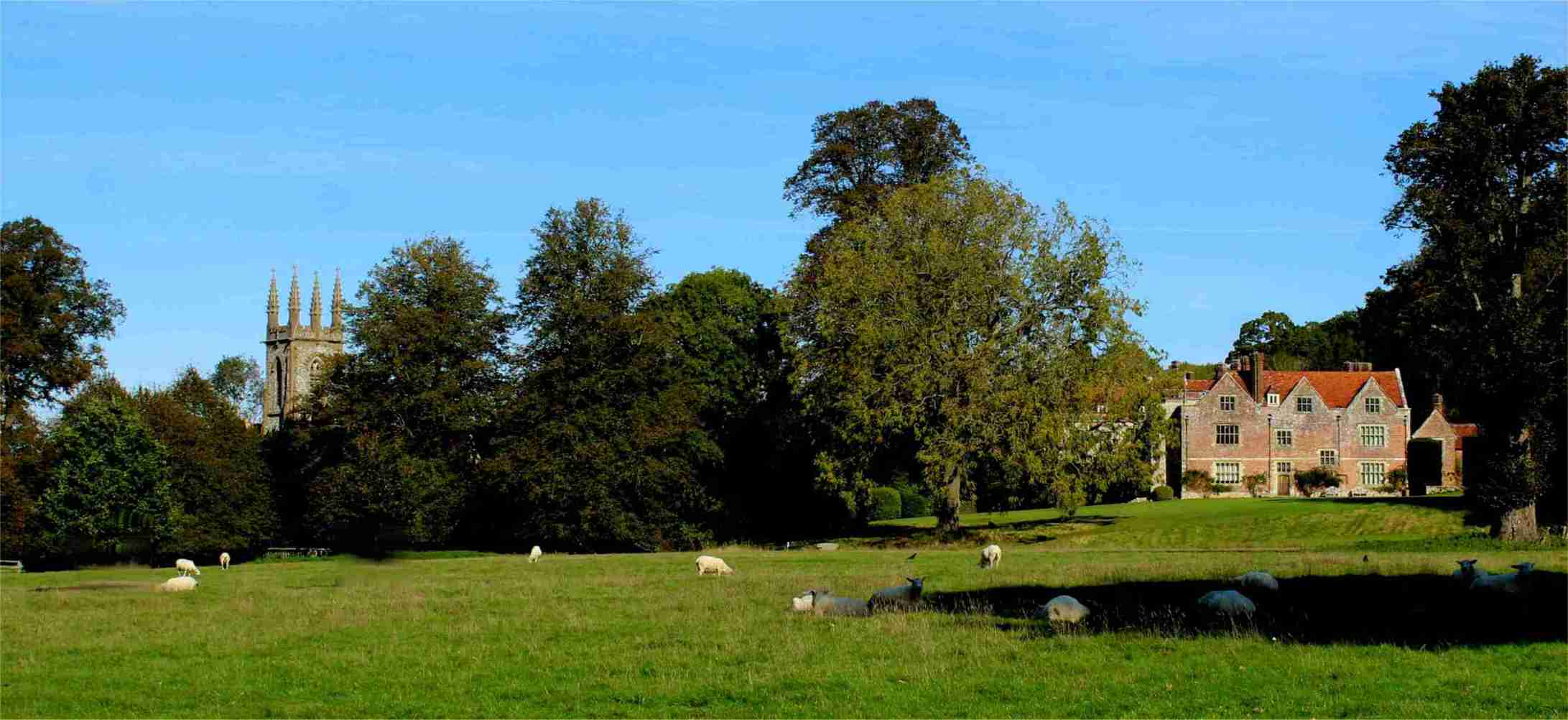
Chawton house, church and sheep

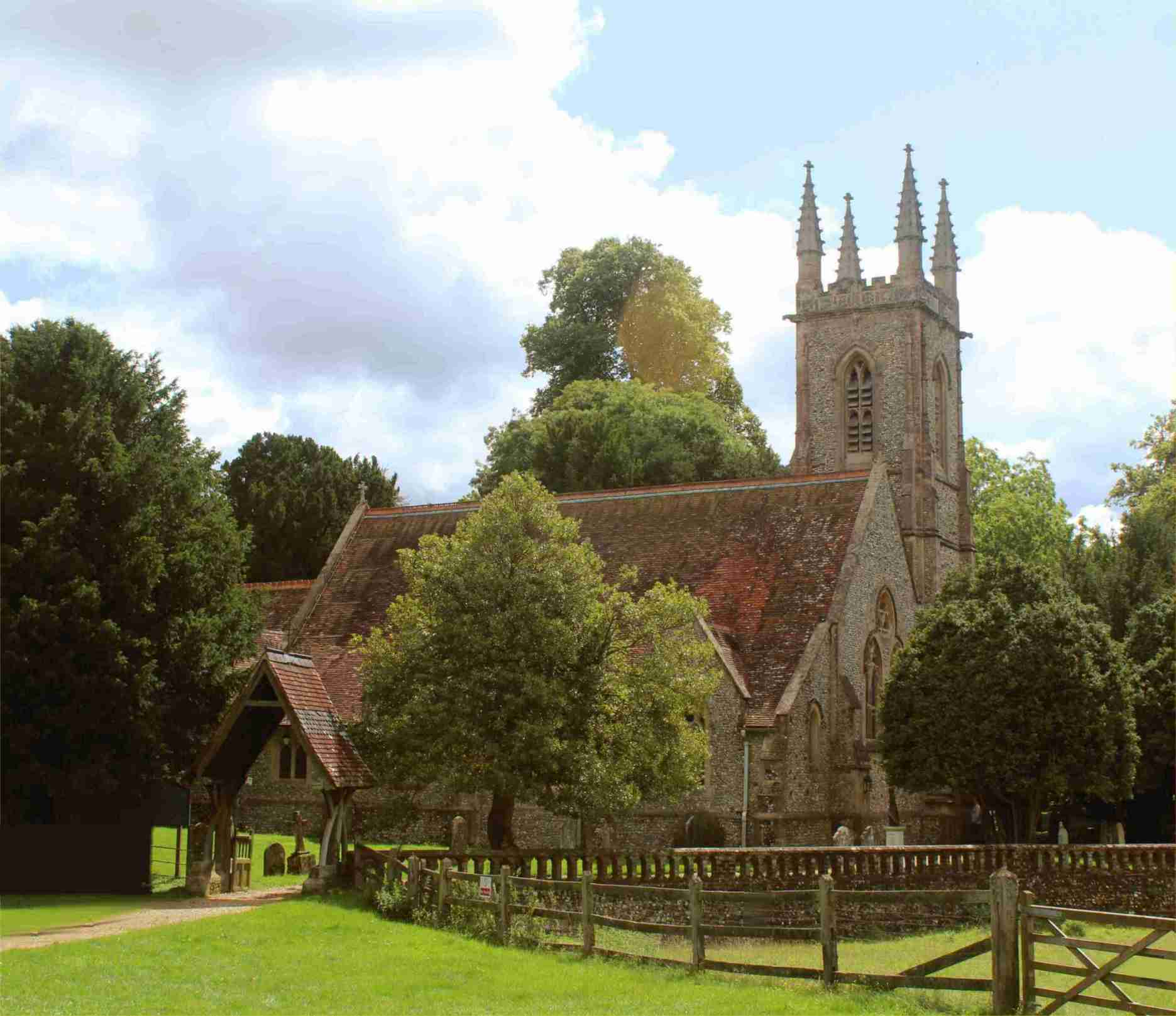
Chawton St Nicholas church

Between the house and the public road is St Nicholas' church.

The present building dates from 1872 but an inscription states that a church has been on this site since 1289 (see the drawing at the beginning of this entry which includes both the house and church before the 1871 fire). It also states that the main part of the present structure was funded by Sir Arthur Blomfield after a fire in 1871.

In the churchyard are the graves of Cassandra Austen (elder sister of the novelist Jane Austen) and their mother.

== The Library ==
By 1793, Zechariah Cozens' guidebook A Tour Through the Isle of Thanet: And Some Other Parts of East Kent described the Godmersham Park library as “a most excellent library." In 1798, when Edward Austen Knight took possession of Godmersham Park, the library contained about 1200 titles. A catalogue of the library's contents dated 1818 includes a wide range of subjects typical of a country house library, including a high number of novels. Eventually, the library was moved from Godmersham Park to Chawton House; many books in the collection were eventually dispersed, as is evidenced through auction catalogues and research by book historians.

In 1992 a 125-year lease on the house was purchased for £1.25 million by a foundation established by Sandra Lerner and Leonard Bosack, co-founders of Cisco Systems.

The Library was opened in 2003 to specialist scholars. It has a collection of over 9,000 books together with related original manuscripts.

The Library works in partnership with the University of Southampton, and provides an important resource for the university's MA in 18th Century Study.

In 2015 the house opened to general visitors in addition to specialist scholars.

In 2016 Lerner left the board and the foundation now includes other projects.

The Library is now 'The Centre for the Study of Early Women's Writing, 1600–1830'.

=== Women Writers ===
Chawton House Library is an independent research library and study centre which focuses on women's writing in English from 1600 to 1830. The library's main aim is to promote and facilitate study in the field of early women's writing. This library was created by Ms Sandy Lerner in the late 1990's, in remembrance of the writing legacy Jane Austen has provided for other women writers.

Below is a list of some of the female authors whose works are to be found at the Library. The full on-line catalogue is searchable, and can be accessed via the Chawton House website.

- Mary Astell (1666-1731)
- Jane Austen (1775–1817)
- Penelope Aubin (1679–1738)
- Aphra Behn (1640–1689)
- Frances Brooke (1724–1789)
- Mary Brunton (1778–1818)
- Frances Burney (1752–1840)
- Sarah Burney (1772–1844)
- Margaret Cavendish, Duchess of Newcastle-upon-Tyne (1623-1673)
- Isabelle de Charrière (1740–1805)
- Maria Edgeworth (1768–1849)
- Sarah Fielding (1710–1768)
- Mary Hays (1760–1824)
- Eliza Haywood (1693–1756)
- Lucy Hutchinson (1620-1681)
- Elizabeth Inchbald (1753–1821)
- Sophia Lee (1750–1824)
- Harriet Lee (1757–1851)
- Charlotte Lennox (1729–1804)
- Bathsua Makin (1600-1675)
- Delarivier Manley (1663–1724)
- Lady Mary Wortley Montagu (1689–1762)
- Sydney Owenson, Lady Morgan (1783–1859)
- Mary Pix (1666-1709)
- Ann Radcliffe (1764–1823)
- Mary Darby Robinson (1758–1800)
- Anna Seward (1742–1809)
- Mary Shelley (1797–1851)
- Charlotte Turner Smith (1749–1806)
- Elizabeth Byron Strutt (1805–1863)
- Melesina Chenevix St. George Trench (1768–1827)
- Mary Wollstonecraft (1759–1797)

=== Knight Collection ===
The Library also houses the Knight Collection, a private collection of books belonging to the Knight family who owned and lived at Chawton House for 400 years. This collection of books was once owned by Edward Austen Knight, the brother of Jane Austen, and she writes in her letters of spending extensive time in the library.

=== Novels Online project ===
The Novels Online ongoing project makes freely accessible the full-text transcripts of some of the rarest works in the Chawton House Library collection to stimulate interest in these works amongst a new generation of readers. These texts explore broad-ranging themes including satire, slavery, marriage, witchcraft and piracy.

The texts are completely unedited, and have been copied from the originals as accurately as possible. Even printer errors have been retained.

=== Chawton House Library: Women's Novels ===
Routledge has published, to date, thirty-two novels from the Chawton Library collections as part of their Chawton House Library: Women's Novels series.

- [Anon.] Celia in Search of a Husband: By a Modern Antique. Ed. Caroline Franklin, 2022. ISBN 9780367758356
- [Anon.] The Histories of Some of the Penitents in the Magdalen House. 1759. Ed. Jennie Batchelor and Megan Hiatt, 2016. ISBN 9781138235922
- Marguerite Blessington. Marmaduke Herbert; or, the Fatal Error. 1847. Ed. Susanne Schmid, 2018. ISBN 9781848935884
- Frances Brooke. The History of Lady Julia Mandeville. 1763. Ed. Enit Karafili Steiner, 2016. ISBN 9781138235403
- Mary Brunton. Discipline. 1814. Ed. Olivia Murphy, 2018. ISBN 9781138629578
- Mary Brunton. Self-Control. 1811. Ed. Anthony Mandal, 2016. ISBN 9781138235540
- Sarah Harriet Burney. The Romance of Private Life. 1839. Ed. Lorna Clark, 2016. ISBN 9781138235953
- Mary Charlton. Rosella, or Modern Occurrences. Ed. By Natalie Neill, 2023. ISBN 9781032007724
- Sophie Cottin. Malvina. 1803. Ed. Marijn S. Kaplan, 2015. ISBN 9781848934603
- Charlotte Dacre. Confessions of the Nun of St Omer. 1805. Ed. Lucy Cogan, 2016. ISBN 9781848935303
- Dorothea Du Bois. Theodora, A Novel. 1770. Ed. Lucy Cogan, 2021. ISBN 9780367714215
- Sarah Fielding. The History of the Countess of Dellwyn. 1759. Ed. Gillian Skinner, 2022. ISBN 9781138544482
- E. M. Foster. The Corinna of England, or a Heroine in the Shade; A Modern Romance. Ed. Sylvia Bordoni, 2016. ISBN 9781138236028
- Stephanie-Felicite De Genlis. Adelaide and Theodore. Ed. Gillian Dow, 2016. ISBN 9781138235946
- Phebe Gibbes. The History of Lady Louisa Stroud, and the Honourable Miss Caroline Stretton. 1764. Ed. Mike Franklin, 2022. ISBN 9781032002279
- Ann Gomersall. The Citizen. 1790. Ed. Margaret S. Yoon, 2016. ISBN 9781138235397
- Sarah Green. The Private History of the Court of England. 1808. Ed. Fiona Price, 2016. ISBN 9781138235687
- Sarah Green. Romance Readers and Romance Writers. 1810. Ed. Christopher Goulding, 2016. ISBN 9781138235717
- Anna Maria Hall. Sketches of Irish Character. 1829; 1844. Ed. Marion Durnin, 2016. ISBN 9781138235489
- Elizabeth Ham. The Ford Family in Ireland. 1845. Ed. Jennifer Martin. Forthcoming, 2022. ISBN 9780367710088
- Mary Hays. Family Annals, or the Sisters. 1817. Ed. Li-ching Chen. Forthcoming, 2022. ISBN 9781032059525
- Eliza Haywood. The Invisible Spy. 1755. Ed. Carol Stewart, 2016. ISBN 9781138235557
- Eliza Haywood. The Rash Resolve and Life's Progress. 1724; 1748. Ed. Carol Stewart, 2016. ISBN 9781138235472
- Elizabeth Hervey. The History of Ned Evans. Ed. Helena Kelly, 2016. ISBN 9781138235694
- Christian Isobel Johnstone. Clan-Albin: A National Tale. 1815. Ed. Juliette Shields. Forthcoming, 2022. ISBN 9781032300856
- Elizabeth Hays Lanfear. Fatal Errors; or Poor Mary-Anne. A Tale of the Last Century. 1819. Eds. Timothy Whelan and Felicity James, 2019. ISBN 9781138544611
- Alicia LeFanu. Strathallan. 1816. Ed. Anna M Fitzer, 2016. ISBN 9781138236042
- Isabelle de Montolieu. Caroline of Lichtfield. Trans. Thomas Holcroft, 1816. Ed. Laura Kirkley, 2016. ISBN 9781138235502
- Sydney Owenson. Florence Macarthy: An Irish Tale. 1818. Ed. Jenny McAuley, 2016. ISBN 9781138235410
- Translations and Continuations: Riccoboni and Brooke, Graffigny and Roberts. Ed. Marijn S Kaplan, 2016. ISBN 9781138235380
- Elizabeth Sophia Tomlins. The Victim of Fancy. 1787. Ed. Daniel Cook, 2016. ISBN 9781138235588
- Helen Maria Williams. Julia. 1790. Ed. Natasha Duquette, 2016. ISBN 9781138235915

== Gardens ==
The gardens are open to the public whenever the house is open, and there is access to The Old Kitchen Tearoom. The restoration programme for the Gardens was extensive, and focused in particular on the restoration of the Walled Garden. Edward Knight had the idea to build a new walled garden during Jane Austen's lifetime. In 1813, she wrote to her brother Frank, "He [Knight] talks of making a new Garden; the present is a bad one & ill situated, near Mr Papillon's; — he means to have the new, at the top of the Lawn behind his own house." Knight's original walls are mostly still intact, but the glasshouses and potting sheds, had to be rebuilt. The gardens have been restored using Edward Austen Knight's original planting scheme. The central space is used for the production of vegetables, soft fruits, herbs and flowers. Chawton House is registered with the Soil Association, and is now certified as an organic producer. Everything grown in the walled garden is for use by the Library, with any surplus being sold locally in aid of the charity.

The park and Gardens of Chawton House are Grade II listed on the Register of Historic Parks and Gardens.

== The Jane Austen connection ==
Chawton house is situated about 400m away from the cottage where Austen lived for the last eight years of her life. This now houses the Jane Austen's House Museum, which is a large 17th-century house in the centre of the village of Chawton, owned by the Jane Austen Memorial Trust since 1947 and preserved in her memory. The two houses, Chawton House and Jane Austen's House, are separately run charities.

Austen is known to have been a visitor to what she knew as the 'Great House', and she references it a number of times in her letters. Edward Austen also loaned it to his brother, Francis Austen. Edward Austen himself resided at Godmersham Park,but his son, Edward Knight II, moved to Chawton House following his marriage, and sold Godmersham Park following his father's death.

Chawton House is the venue of the Annual General Meeting of the Jane Austen Society of the United Kingdom. In 2003 the Jane Austen Society of North America held its 25th Anniversary AGM in the grounds of Chawton House.

== Visiting Chawton House ==
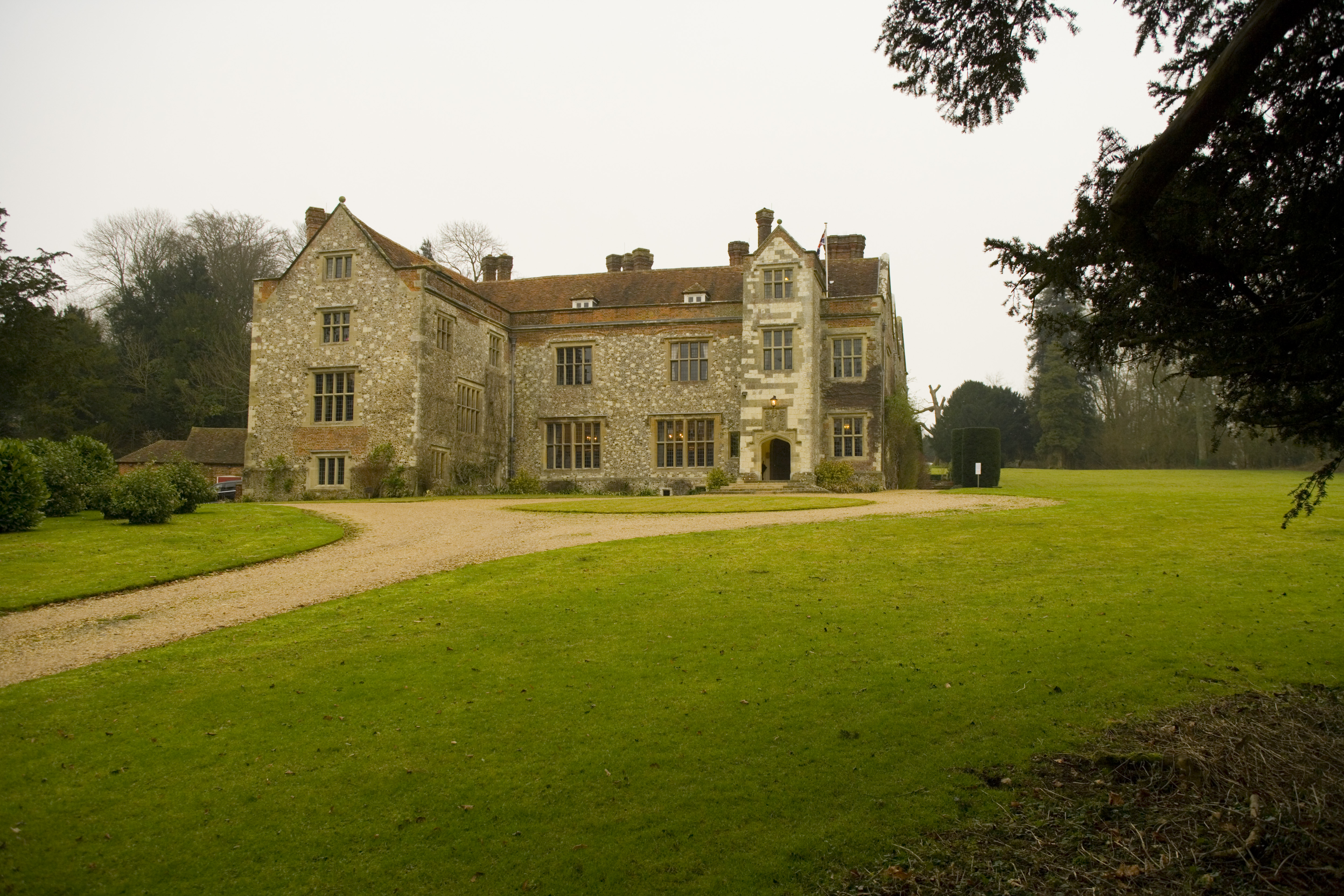
Chawton House from the driveway

Chawton House & Gardens is open to the public up to seven days a week in the summer. Access to the Library itself is also available to members of the public who would like to use the library collections.

== Events ==
Events are held regularly at the library, covering a range of topics relating to the House and Gardens, and material held by the Library; these include lectures and talks by Visiting Fellows and other experts, exhibitions, arts and other events, including Heritage Open Days, garden tours, and early morning rambles.

The library also offers educational visits to schools, colleges and universities allowing the chance for teachers and students to engage with a variety of themes within a working, historic building. Both a formal programme of sessions and a bespoke service, to study specific areas in more detail, can be provided.

== Sources ==
- Wheeler, Michael. "Chawton House Library: Transforming the Literary Landscape", Early Modern Literary Studies 6.3 (January, 2001): 9.1-16 <URL: http://purl.oclc.org/emls/06-3/chawton.htm>.
- Tennant, Laura (20 July 2003). "A Writer at Large: Sandy Lerner's Persuasion". The Independent on Sunday. Archived from the original on 10 May 2005.
