= Edward D'Aeth =

English cricketer

Personal information
- Full name: Edward Knatchbull Hughes D'Aeth
- Born: 11 September 1866; Knowlton, Kent, England
- Died: 19 September 1923 (aged 57); New York City, New York, United States
- Batting: Right-handed
- Bowling: Right-arm fast-medium
- Relatives: Lewis D'Aeth (brother); Henry Knight (grandfather)

Domestic team information
- Years: Team
- 1885: Oxford University

Career statistics
Competition	First-class
Matches	3
Runs scored	44
Batting average	8.80
100s/50s	–/–
Top score	22
Catches/stumpings	1/–
- Source: Cricinfo, 18 April 2020

Edward Knatchbull Hughes D'Aeth (11 September 1866 – 19 September 1923) was an English first-class cricketer.

The son of Narborough Hughes D'Aeth, he was born at Knowlton Court in Kent in September 1866. He was educated at Haileybury, before going up to St Mary Hall, Oxford in 1885, before transferring to Lincoln College, Oxford in April 1886. While studying at Oxford, he three appearances in first-class cricket for Oxford University in 1885, against the Marylebone Cricket Club, Lancashire and the Gentlemen of England. In his three first-class matches for Oxford, D'Aeth scored 44 runs with a high score of 22.

He later migrated to Florida to become a fruit farmer, where he married in 1894 and was living at Tampa in 1899. D'Aeth died at New York City in September 1923. His grandfather, Henry Knight, and brother, Lewis D'Aeth, both played first-class cricket.
