= Listed buildings in Godmersham =

Historic structures in Kent, England

Godmersham is a village and civil parish in the Borough of Ashford of Kent, England. It contains two grade I and 35 grade II listed buildings that are recorded in the National Heritage List for England.

This list is based on the information retrieved online from Historic England.

== Key ==
Grade	Criteria
I	Buildings that are of exceptional interest
II*	Particularly important buildings of more than special interest
II	Buildings that are of special interest

== Listing ==
Name	Grade	Location	Type	Completed (Note: The date given is the date used by Historic England as significant for the initial building or that of an important part in the structure's description.)	Date designated	Grid ref. (Note: The grid reference is based on the British national grid reference system, sometimes known as OSGB36, used by the Ordnance Survey.) Geo-coordinates	Notes	Entry number (Note: The "List Entry Number" is a unique number assigned to each listed building and scheduled monument by Historic England.)	Image	Wikidata
Little Winchcombe Little Winchcombe Farmhouse	II				27 November 1957	TR0836949692; 51°12′30″N 0°58′54″E		1299521	Upload Photo	Q26586917
Stour Bridge	II				13 August 1984	TR0626850393; 51°12′56″N 0°57′07″E		1071266	Upload Photo	Q26326333
Brookswood House	II	Ashford Road			18 January 1995	TR0730751465; 51°13′29″N 0°58′03″E		1222208	Upload Photo	Q26516555
Further Northfield	II	Bilting Lane, Bilting			27 November 1957	TR0564149250; 51°12′20″N 0°56′33″E		1185736	Upload Photo	Q26481034
Home Farmhouse	II	Bilting Lane			13 August 1984	TR0554249151; 51°12′16″N 0°56′28″E		1071267	Upload Photo	Q26326335
Redfern	II	Bilting Lane, Bilting			13 August 1984	TR0561649116; 51°12′15″N 0°56′31″E		1362761	Upload Photo	Q26644630
34 and 35, Canterbury Road	II	34 and 35, Canterbury Road, Bilting			13 August 1984	TR0504448778; 51°12′05″N 0°56′01″E		1071229	Upload Photo	Q26326253
7a and 7, Canterbury Road	II	7a and 7, Canterbury Road			13 August 1984	TR0662250716; 51°13′06″N 0°57′26″E		1299503	Upload Photo	Q26586901
Barn at Court Lodge Farm	II	Canterbury Road			27 November 1957	TR0615050528; 51°13′00″N 0°57′02″E		1185741	Upload Photo	Q26481040
Bilting Cottage	II	Canterbury Road, Bilting			13 August 1984	TR0553849386; 51°12′24″N 0°56′28″E		1362785	Upload Photo	Q26644654
Bilting Court	II	Canterbury Road, Bilting			13 August 1984	TR0542749440; 51°12′26″N 0°56′22″E		1071231	Upload Photo	Q26326257
Bilting House	II	Canterbury Road, Bilting			13 August 1984	TR0507148816; 51°12′06″N 0°56′03″E		1362784	Upload Photo	Q26644653
Church Cottages	II	1 and 2, Canterbury Road			13 August 1984	TR0620950361; 51°12′55″N 0°57′04″E		1362763	Upload Photo	Q26644632
Church of St Lawrence	I	Canterbury Road			27 November 1957	TR0620450451; 51°12′58″N 0°57′04″E		1299528	Church of St Lawrence More images	Q17529419
Crack O'dawn Cottages	II	1-2 Crack O'dawn Cottages, Canterbury Road, Bilting			13 August 1984	TR0531349127; 51°12′16″N 0°56′16″E		1071270	Upload Photo	Q26326341
Dovecot 15 Yards North of Temple Cottage	II	Canterbury Road			13 August 1984	TR0645750926; 51°13′13″N 0°57′18″E		1071269	Upload Photo	Q26326339
Everett House	II	Canterbury Road, Bilting			13 August 1984	TR0532449248; 51°12′20″N 0°56′17″E		1071230	Upload Photo	Q26326255
Godmersham Bridge	II	Canterbury Road			27 November 1957	TR0635450946; 51°13′13″N 0°57′13″E		1185739	Upload Photo	Q26481037
Mistletoe Cottage	II	Canterbury Road, Bilting			4 September 1987	TR0537449261; 51°12′20″N 0°56′19″E		1362751	Upload Photo	Q26644621
Temple Cottage	II	Canterbury Road			13 August 1984	TR0644950910; 51°13′12″N 0°57′18″E		1185768	Upload Photo	Q26481067
The Old Post Office	II	Canterbury Road			13 August 1984	TR0665250705; 51°13′05″N 0°57′28″E		1362762	Upload Photo	Q26644631
The Old Vicarage	II	Canterbury Road			13 August 1984	TR0623850769; 51°13′08″N 0°57′07″E		1071268	Upload Photo	Q26326337
Godmersham Park, Courtyards, Walled Gardens and Gateways	I	Courtyards, Walled Gardens And Gateways, Godmersham Park			13 October 1952	TR0615451018; 51°13′16″N 0°57′03″E		1071232	Godmersham Park, Courtyards, Walled Gardens and Gateways More images	Q17529295
Eggarton Manor	II	Eggarton Lane			11 September 1974	TR0786250432; 51°12′55″N 0°58′30″E		1299512	Upload Photo	Q26586910
Stables, (now Cottages) 30 Yards North East of Eggarton Manor	II	(now Cottages) 30 Yards North East Of Eggarton Manor, Eggarton Lane			13 August 1984	TR0787650474; 51°12′56″N 0°58′30″E		1299513	Upload Photo	Q26586911
Wheel House and Donkey Wheel at Eggarton Manor	II	Eggarton Lane			27 November 1957	TR0785750448; 51°12′55″N 0°58′29″E		1362786	Upload Photo	Q26644655
Deer Park House	II	Godmersham Park			27 November 1957	TR0606151470; 51°13′31″N 0°56′59″E		1185817	Upload Photo	Q26481113
Fountain in Yew Court, Godmersham Park	II	Godmersham Park			13 August 1984	TR0619650906; 51°13′12″N 0°57′05″E		1362787	Upload Photo	Q26644656
Game Larder/barn 20 Yards North of Deer Park House	II	Godmersham Park			13 August 1984	TR0605051496; 51°13′32″N 0°56′59″E		1071234	Upload Photo	Q26326262
Garden Temple	II	Godmersham Park			13 August 1984	TR0608350696; 51°13′06″N 0°56′59″E		1185821	Upload Photo	Q26481117
Sundial in Swimming Pool Court, Godmersham Park	II	Godmersham Park			13 August 1984	TR0620850945; 51°13′14″N 0°57′06″E		1071233	Upload Photo	Q26326260
Temple at Temple Hill	II	Godmersham Park, Temple Hill			27 November 1957	TR0668051046; 51°13′16″N 0°57′30″E		1362748	Upload Photo	Q26644618
Pope Street Farmhouse	II	Pope Street			27 November 1957	TR0765951467; 51°13′29″N 0°58′21″E		1299490	Upload Photo	Q26586889
Statue of Neptune, Swimming Pool Court, Godmersham Park	II	Swimming Pool Court, Godmersham Park			13 August 1984	TR0618450923; 51°13′13″N 0°57′04″E		1185808	Upload Photo	Q26481105
13 and 14, the Street	II	13 and 14, The Street			13 August 1984	TR0674350677; 51°13′04″N 0°57′33″E		1362749	Upload Photo	Q26644619
15 and 16, the Street	II	15 and 16, The Street			13 August 1984	TR0676650672; 51°13′04″N 0°57′34″E		1185840	Upload Photo	Q26481135
Yew Trees	II	The Street			13 August 1984	TR0672250684; 51°13′05″N 0°57′31″E		1071235	Upload Photo	Q26326264

== See also ==
- Grade I listed buildings in Kent
- Grade II* listed buildings in Kent

== Sources ==
- Newman, John (2012) [1969], Kent: West and the Weald, The Buildings of England, New Haven and London: Yale University Press, ISBN 978-0-300-18509-6
