= Urban Decay (cosmetics) =

American cosmetics line

- Type: Subsidiary
- Industry: Cosmetics
- Founded: 1996; 30 years ago
- Founder: Pat Holmes, Sandy Lerner, Wende Zomnir and David Soward
- Headquarters: Newport Beach, California, United States
- Area served: Worldwide
- Key people: Tim Warner, CEO; Wende Zomnir, CCO
- Products: Cosmetics and beauty products
- Parent: L'Oréal
- Website: urbandecay.com

Urban Decay, an American cosmetics brand headquartered in Newport Beach, California, is a subsidiary of French cosmetics company L'Oréal.

Current products include lip, eye, complexion and body products. They are best known for their Naked collection, which includes 12 different eye shadow palettes. Its target market is women, although it is not limited to this range, and is also designed to appeal to customers who wish to purchase cruelty-free makeup. Its products are sold at large department stores in the United States, such as Macy's, Sephora, Ulta, Nordstrom, and from the official website, as well as in several other countries such as Mexico and Germany.

== History ==
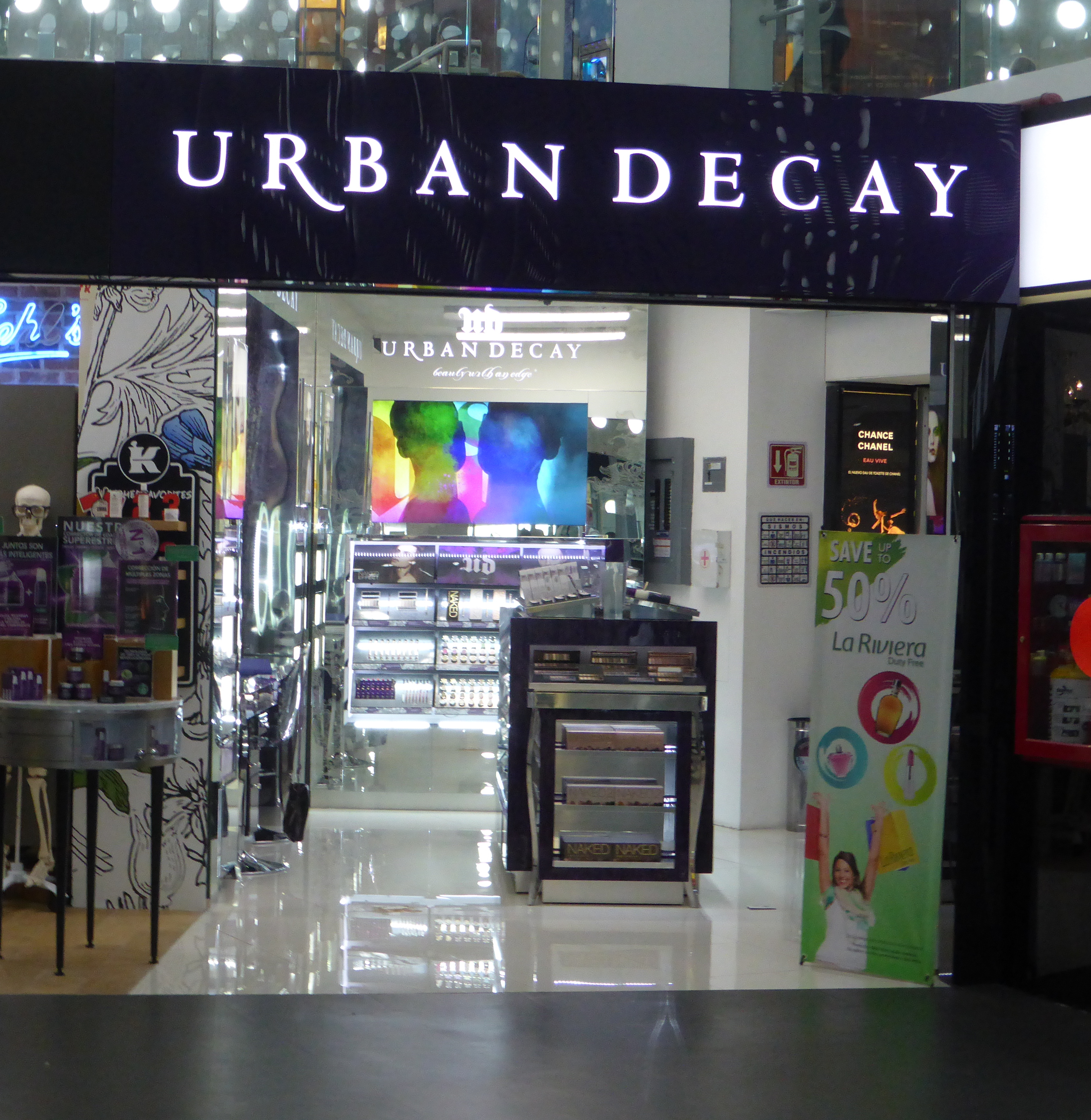
Urban Decay shop at Mexico City International Airport

Pink, red, and beige tones dominated the beauty industry palette until the mid-1990s. In 1995, Sandy Lerner, a co-founder of Cisco Systems, and Patricia Holmes were at Lerner's mansion outside London when Holmes mixed raspberry and black to form a new color. Then, they decided to form a cosmetics company, which they named Urban Decay. Launched in January 1996, it offered a line of ten lipsticks and 12 nail polishes. Their color palette was inspired by the urban landscape, with names such as Roach, Smog, Rust, Oil Slick, and Acid Rain.

In 2000, Moet-Hennessy Louis Vuitton (a diversified luxury goods group) purchased Urban Decay. In 2002, the Falic Group (owners of the Perry Ellis fragrance lines) purchased Urban Decay. In 2009, Castanea Partners (a private equity firm) acquired Urban Decay. On 26 November 2012, L'Oréal announced it would purchase Urban Decay Cosmetics. L'Oréal acquired the company in 2012. L'Oréal paid an estimated amount of $350 million for Urban Decay.

In Spring 2015, Urban Decay expanded its social media presence with a Tumblr site, The Violet Underground. It features collaborations with young artists such as Baron Von Fancy.

== Ambassadors ==
Recent celebrity ambassadors for Urban Decay include Ruby Rose and Nicole Richie. In June 2019, Urban Decay announced its new motto "Pretty Different" and named five global citizens as their brand ambassadors - Ezra Miller, Lizzo, Joey King, Karol G, and CL. A year later they announced three more ambassadors to promote their Naked Ultraviolet palette - Normani, G.E.M and Camila Mendes. In January 2021, the South Korean worldwide idol group Monsta X was announced as the brand's global ambassadors and the promotions will start in February.

== Collections ==
The Naked Collection was released initially with the Naked Palette, a set of 12 full-size eyeshadows in neutral, matte, and metallic earth tones and an eyeshadow brush from the company's signature synthetic brushes.

The collection later expanded to include other eyeshadow palettes like Naked Basics, Naked 2, Naked2 Basics, Naked 3, Naked Smoky, Naked Ultimate Basics, Naked Heat, Naked Heat Petite, Naked Cherry, Naked Reloaded, Naked Honey, Naked Ultraviolet, Naked Cyber, Naked Metal Mania and Naked Wild West. The collection also offers mini eyeshadow palettes like Naked Half-Baked, Naked Sin, and NakedFoxy. A sub-collection of the original Naked collection, Naked Complexion, includes other skin products like foundations, concealers, blushes, highlighters, bronzers and makeup tools to accompany them.

Urban Decay also features collections from collaborations with celebrities like Gwen Stefani. The collaboration with Stefani is part of a larger female-empowerment initiative, The Ultraviolet Edge, that Urban Decay launched in order to reach a goal of donating $750,000 to organizations that benefit women in 2016.

In 2018 Urban Decay collaborated with beauty influencer Kristen Leanne, an advocate for cruelty-free cosmetics, to launch the UD × Kristen Leanne collection. The collection included two eyeshadow palettes, a single eyeshadow, lipsticks and a face palette.

The company also released two limited-edition eyeshadow palettes inspired by the live-action Disney films Alice in Wonderland and Alice Through the Looking Glass.

In early 2017, Urban Decay announced its Vice liquid lipstick collection would be released. The name of Vice became a real business card of this brand after they introduced their lipstick palette. In their Revolution lip gloss series, tone with this name became the most popular out of the whole lineup.

== Corporate social responsibility ==
Urban Decay launched a global initiative in 2017, The Ultraviolet Edge, which stands for the empowerment of women. The company pledged to donate 100 percent of the profits from the sale of a limited-edition Eyeshadow Primer Potion to the non-profit organizations that support women from developing countries.

Urban Decay is certified by PETA as cruelty-free that avoids and committed to ending animal testing. They claim not to test their products on animals nor allowing others to test on their behalf. Furthermore, Urban Decay also demands their suppliers to confirm that their products were not tested on animals.
