= Bilting =

Hamlet in Kent, England

Coordinates: 51.206778°N 0.941787°E

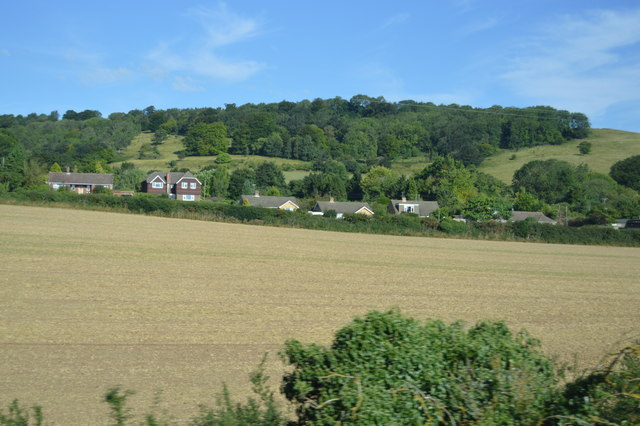
- Bilting

- Location within Kent
- OS grid reference: TR056494
- Civil parish: Godmersham
- District: Ashford
- Shire county: Kent
- Region: South East
- Country: England
- Sovereign state: United Kingdom
- Post town: Ashford
- Postcode district: TN25
- Dialling code: 01227
- Police: Kent
- Fire: Kent
- Ambulance: South East Coast
- UK Parliament: Weald of Kent

Bilting is a hamlet within the civil parish of Godmersham in the Ashford District of Kent, England. It stretches along the A28 at the foot of the Godmersham Downs, five miles northeast of Ashford town. At the 2011 Census, the population of the hamlet was included in the civil parish of Wye with Hinxhill

Bilting Farm has been growing mushrooms since the 1930s, but now most of the farm has been converted to light industrial units and only a small number of speciality mushrooms are grown for local farmers' markets.
