= Sandy Lerner =

American entrepreneur and animal rights activist

- Born: 1955 (age 70–71); California, U.S.
- Education: California State University, Chico, Claremont Graduate University, Stanford University
- Known for: Co-Founder of Cisco Systems; Co-Founder of Urban Decay
- Spouse: Leonard Bosack (divorced)

Sandy Lerner (born 1955) is an American businesswoman and philanthropist. She co-founded Cisco Systems and used the money from its sale to pursue interests in animal welfare and women's writing. One of her main projects, Chawton House, is in England, but most of her work remains in the United States.

Sandy currently resides in Virginia, where she owns Ayrshire Farm. Lerner dedicates her time to Chawton House Library and the animal welfare community worldwide.

== Early life and education ==
Lerner is a northern California native.

In 1975, she received her bachelor's degree in political science from California State University, Chico. In 1977, she received a master's degree in econometrics from the Claremont Graduate University. In 1981, she received a master's degree in statistics and computer science from Stanford University.

== Cisco Systems ==
In 1984, while working as director of computer facilities for the Stanford University Graduate School of Business, Lerner co-founded Cisco Systems with her then-partner and now-former husband Len Bosack. Lerner and Bosack worked with Stanford students and faculty on a project to better connect all of the school's computer systems. They later adapted software used at Stanford into what would become the foundation for Cisco IOS.

Lerner told the story of Cisco's startup on the podcast, How I Built This, in which Cisco's early days involved building routers in the living room and financing the business using credit cards. She emphasized the collaborative nature of the work and that despite communication protocols being public domain, developed largely from collaborative work at Stanford, Cisco was still able to produce products people wanted to buy.

Lerner and Bosack brought in John Morgridge to be the second CEO of Cisco in 1988. On August 28, 1990, Lerner was fired; upon hearing the news, Bosack resigned in solidarity. The two sold all of their stock for $170 million and retired from Cisco. Lerner and Bosack divorced in the early 1990s.

== Other business projects ==
In 1996, Lerner purchased Ayrshire Farm, a 600-acre (2.4 km^{2}) estate in Upperville, Virginia. The circa-1912, 42-room Edwardian mansion of native fieldstone has since been restored and was used for a variety of social functions under Lerner's direction. Ayrshire Farm's mission has been to farm sustainably and profitably, promoting the benefits of locally produced, humanely-raised meats and organic produce to the consumer, the community, and children through education, outreach, and example. The farm was the first in Virginia to meet both Certified Humane and Certified Organic standards.

Lerner placed a portion of her stock earnings into a start-up venture capital limited partnership called "& Capital Partners." One of the companies it funded was Urban Decay Cosmetics, with the tag line "does pink make you puke?" In February 2000, Moet-Hennessy Louis Vuitton (LVMH), the French luxury goods conglomerate, acquired the firm. It was spun off from LVMH in December 2002.

Lerner also owns Hunter's Head Tavern in Upperville, Virginia, and Gentle Harvest in Marshall, Virginia.

== Artistic projects and philanthropy ==
In 1992, through the foundation she shares with Leonard Bosack, Lerner invested money into the restoration of the Chawton House, which was once owned by Jane Austen's brother, Edward Austen Knight. In 2003, it opened as the Centre for the Study of Early Women's Writing, 1600–1830. In 2016, Lerner resigned from the board of trustees and withdrew the financial support of her foundation.

In November 2011, Lerner published a sequel to Jane Austen's Pride and Prejudice, titled Second Impressions, using the pen name of Ava Farmer (for "a Virginia farmer"). In August 2017, Lerner released Caticons, a book of art imitating cats. Cat news website, The Purrington Post, said that the book was a "Must have" for cat lovers.

In September 2023, Lerner wrote the foreword to Founder vs Investor: The Honest Truth About Venture Capital From Startup To IPO, a book about the toxicity in relationships between venture capitalists and startup founders.

== Awards and recognition ==
Lerner was awarded an honorary degree in 2005 from Southampton University and a Doctor of Sciences in 2012 from California State University, Chico.

In 2009, the Institute of Electrical and Electronics Engineers Computer Society honored Sandra Lerner and Leonard Bosack with its Computer Entrepreneur Award "for founding Cisco Systems and pioneering and advancing the commercialization of routing technology and the profound changes this technology enabled in the computer industry."

In 1998, Lerner was featured in part 2 of the PBS documentary, Nerds 2.0.1. Lerner was also featured in the documentary film, Something Ventured, in 2011.

In 2015, Lerner was presented with an honorary OBE by the Lord Lieutenant of Hampshire, Nigel Atkinson, for her contributions to UK culture. The ceremony was held at the Chawton House.
