= Brook Knight =

English cricketer

Brook John Knight (September 1808 – 10 January 1878) was an English amateur cricketer who played in five first-class cricket matches between 1844 and 1845.

Knight was born at Godmersham in Kent in 1808. He was the brother of Edward, George and Henry Knight, all of whom played first-class cricket. Knight played a total of five first-class matches, three for the Gentlemen of Kent, one for Kent County Cricket Club and one for Marylebone Cricket Club (MCC).

Knight was educated at Winchester College and served in the British Army, commissioned as an ensign in the 37th Regiment of Foot in 1826. He served until 1860, transferring to the 48th Regiment of Foot, the 51st Regiment of Foot and finally joining the 6th Dragoon Guards, rising to the rank of captain. He married Margaret Pearson in 1853 and died in January 1878 at Westminster in London aged 69.

== Bibliography ==
- Carlaw, Derek (2020). Kent County Cricketers, A to Z: Part One (1806–1914) (PDF). Cardiff: ACS.
