= Henry Knight (cricketer) =

English cricketer (1797–1843)

- Born: 27 May 1797
- Died: 31 May 1843 (aged 46)
- Occupation: cricketer

Henry Knight (born Henry Austen; 27 May 1797 – 31 May 1843) was a nephew of Jane Austen and an English cricketer who played for Sussex.

== Life ==
He was born in Rowling near Goodnestone and died in Kent. He was the third son of Jane Austen's brother Edward Austen Knight.

He joined the Army in 1818 as a cornet, was promoted lieutenant in 1821, captain in 1823 and half-pay major in 1826. He retired in 1837.

Knight made a single first-class appearance for Sussex, in 1827, against Kent. In the twelve-a-side match, Knight finished on 3 not out in the first innings, and did not bat in the second. His brothers, George Thomas, Edward and Brook and nephews Philip and Gerald Portal all played first-class cricket.

In 1832 he married Sophia Cage and had a son. After Sophia's death, he married Charlotte Northey, with whom he had a daughter.
