= Wyndham Charles Knight =

Sir Wyndham Charles Knight
- Born: 30 November 1863; Pembrokeshire, Knight, England
- Died: 10 June 1942 (aged 78); Pamber, Hampshire, England
- Education: Cheltenham College
- Occupation: general officer
- Spouses: Harriet Monica Johnston (m. 1896; died 1927) Alice Harriet Margaret Johnstone (m. 1928) Georgina Helen Pipon (m. 1938)

Major-General Sir Wyndham Charles Knight KCIE CB CSI DSO (30 November 1863 – 10 June 1942) was a British general officer who served in the British and Indian armies and saw active service in India, in the Second Boer War, and in the First World War.

== Early life ==
Born in Pembrokeshire, Knight was a son of Captain William Brodnax Knight, late the Queen's Bays, and Louisa Octavia Charlotte Knight, a grandson of Wyndham William Knight, and a descendant of Edward Austen Knight, brother of the novelist Jane Austen.

He was educated at Cheltenham College.

== Career ==
After leaving school, Knight trained for a career as a regular soldier at the Royal Military College, Sandhurst, graduating from there in August 1883 and receiving his first commission into the Worcestershire Regiment. On 25 August 1883 he was appointed a Probationer in the Indian Staff Corps.

In 1897 and 1898 Knight saw active service on the North West Frontier, in Mohmund and Tirah, and fought in the Second Boer War from 1899 to 1902. He went on to command the Bombay Brigade of the 6th Poona Divisional Area and from 1912 to 1917 was an aide-de-camp to King George V.

== Personal life ==
Knight married three times: firstly, in 1896, Harriet Monica Johnston, at Sevenoaks, Kent; she died in October 1927; secondly, in 1928, Alice Harriet Margaret Johnstone, at St George Hanover Square; thirdly, in 1938, Georgina Helen Pipon.

With his first wife, Knight had two sons, Austen Bertram (1897–1976) and Christopher Wyndham (1899–1951), both of whom became soldiers.

He died at Pamber, Hampshire, on 10 June 1942, leaving an estate valued at £15,289. His Executors were Christopher Wyndham Knight and Charles Lennard Chute.

== Honours ==
- Distinguished Service Order, 1902
- Companion of the Order of the Bath, 1916
- Commander of the Order of the Star of India, 1917
- Knight Commander of the Order of the Indian Empire, 1919
