= Gerald Portal =

British diplomat (1858–1894)

Sir Gerald Portal KCMG CB
- Portrait of Gerald Herbert Portal by Violet Manners, Duchess of Rutland

Consul General for British East Africa
- In office 1889–1892

Commissioner of Uganda
- In office 1892 – 30 May 1893
- Succeeded by: James Macdonald

Personal details
- Born: 13 March 1858 Laverstoke, Hampshire, England
- Died: 25 January 1894 (aged 35) London, England
- Profession: Diplomat

Sir Gerald Herbert Portal KCMG CB (13 March 1858 – 25 January 1894) was a British diplomat who was the Consul General for British East Africa and British Special Commissioner to Uganda, and a main figure in the establishment of the Uganda Protectorate.

== Diplomatic career ==
Gerald Portal was the second son of the politician Melville Portal. He was educated at Eton College, joined the diplomatic service as an attaché in 1879, and was posted to Rome where he was promoted to third secretary of legation in 1881.

In June 1882 Portal had the good fortune to be temporarily attached to the consulate-general at Cairo, at a critical period in the history of British relations with Egypt. He was present at the bombardment of Alexandria, and for his services on that occasion received a medal with clasp and the Khedive's Star. He became a favourite with Sir Evelyn Baring (afterwards Lord Cromer), the British representative. On 1 April 1885 he was promoted second secretary. For some weeks in the summers of 1886 and 1887 he took charge of the residency during Lord Cromer's absence, and conducted its affairs with credit.

In October 1887 Portal was ordered to attempt a reconciliation between the Emperor of Ethiopia and the Italian government. Success in such a mission was almost impossible, but he made every effort. He returned on 31 December, without effecting his purpose, but with a considerably enhanced reputation. He was made CB, and in My Mission to Abyssinia (1888) he gave an account of the expedition.

Returning to his duties at the Cairo agency, Portal was chargé d'affaires in the autumn of 1888. From 30 April to 14 November 1889 he acted as Consul-General at Zanzibar, and in 1891 he was appointed there as Consul-General for British East Africa.

== Mission to Uganda ==
In 1892 Portal was appointed British Special Commissioner to East Africa. He was directed to visit Uganda and to report to the British Government on the desirability of setting up a British Protectorate to replace the Imperial British East Africa Company. The British East Africa Company, which was the administrator of British East Africa (including the territory of Uganda), was becoming increasingly ineffective in its venture as a commercial company with colonial administrative rights – amidst conflicts between rival factions, including the Kabaka (King) of Buganda, French Catholic, and British Protestant missionaries.

Portal established a settlement between the French and British Missionaries in Uganda, and on 1 April 1893, Portal hauled down the flag of the British East Africa Company at Mengo (the Kabaka's residence) and hoisted the Union Jack. On 29 May 1893, he signed a treaty with Mwanga II, the Kabaka.

Portal returned to Britain and recommended the declaration of Uganda as a protectorate. He died from typhoid fever in London on 25 January 1894, at the age of 36. On 18 June 1894, Uganda was declared a British Protectorate. In this case, it is therefore important to note that General Portal never declared Uganda as a British protectorate. The declaration was made by Lord Rosebery five months after Portal's death.

The town of Fort Portal in western Uganda, where Portal had his base, is named after him.

== Cricket ==
Portal was a sound middle order batsman and a fast left arm bowler who played for I Zingari. He played in one first class game, scoring 6 and taking 4 wickets for 55 runs.

== Family ==
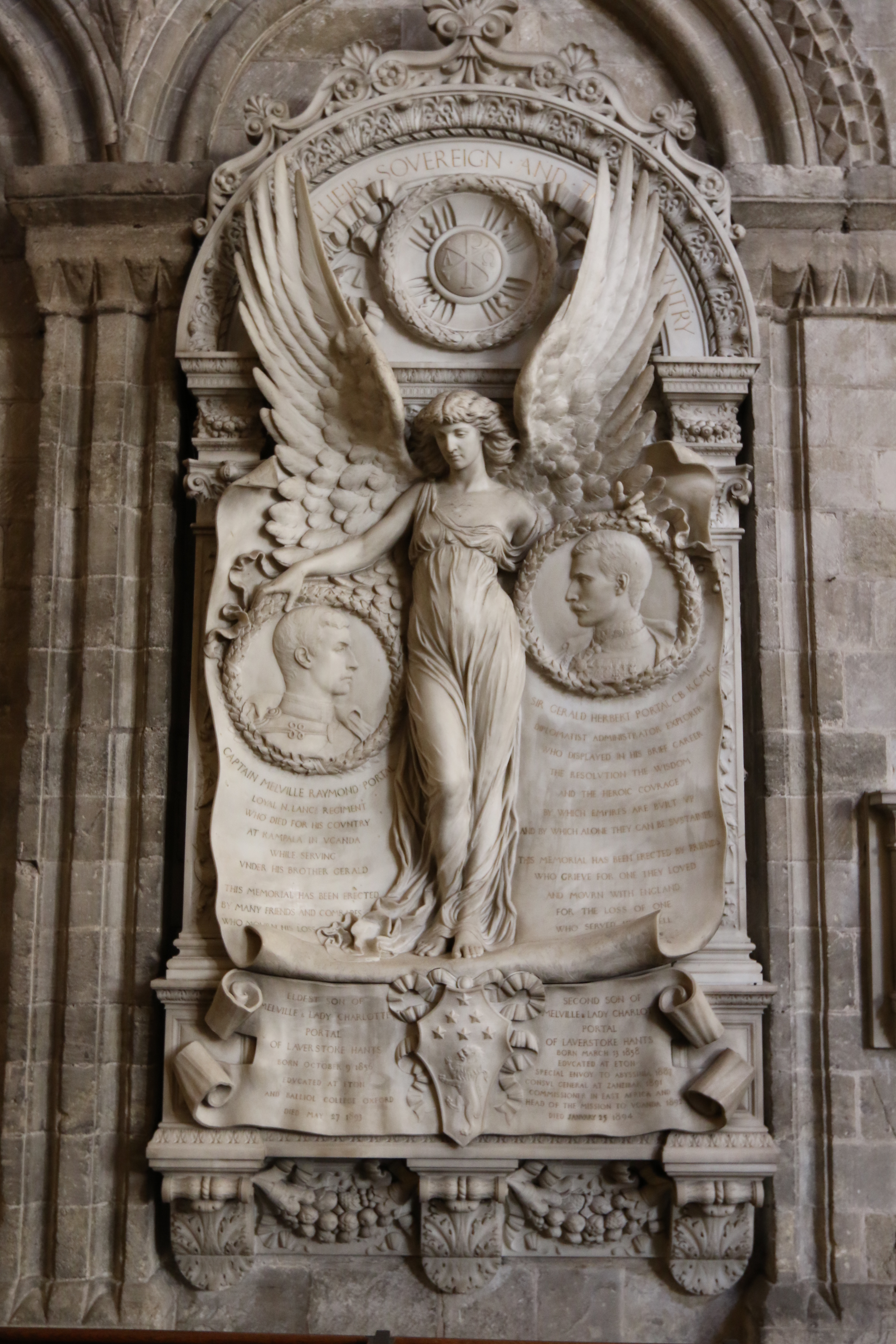
Memorial to Melville Raymond Portal and Gerald Herbert Portal in Winchester Cathedral by sculptor Waldo Story

In 1890 Gerald Portal married Lady Alice Bertie, daughter of the Earl of Abingdon. They had no children.

He is buried in Winchester Cathedral together with his brother, Captain Melville Raymond Portal. Their monument was sculpted by Waldo Story.

== Honours ==
- Companion of the Order of the Bath (CB) – 1888
- Knight Commander of the Order of St Michael and St George (KCMG) – 1892
