= Godmersham =

Village in Kent, England

Coordinates: 51.2180°N 0.9571°E

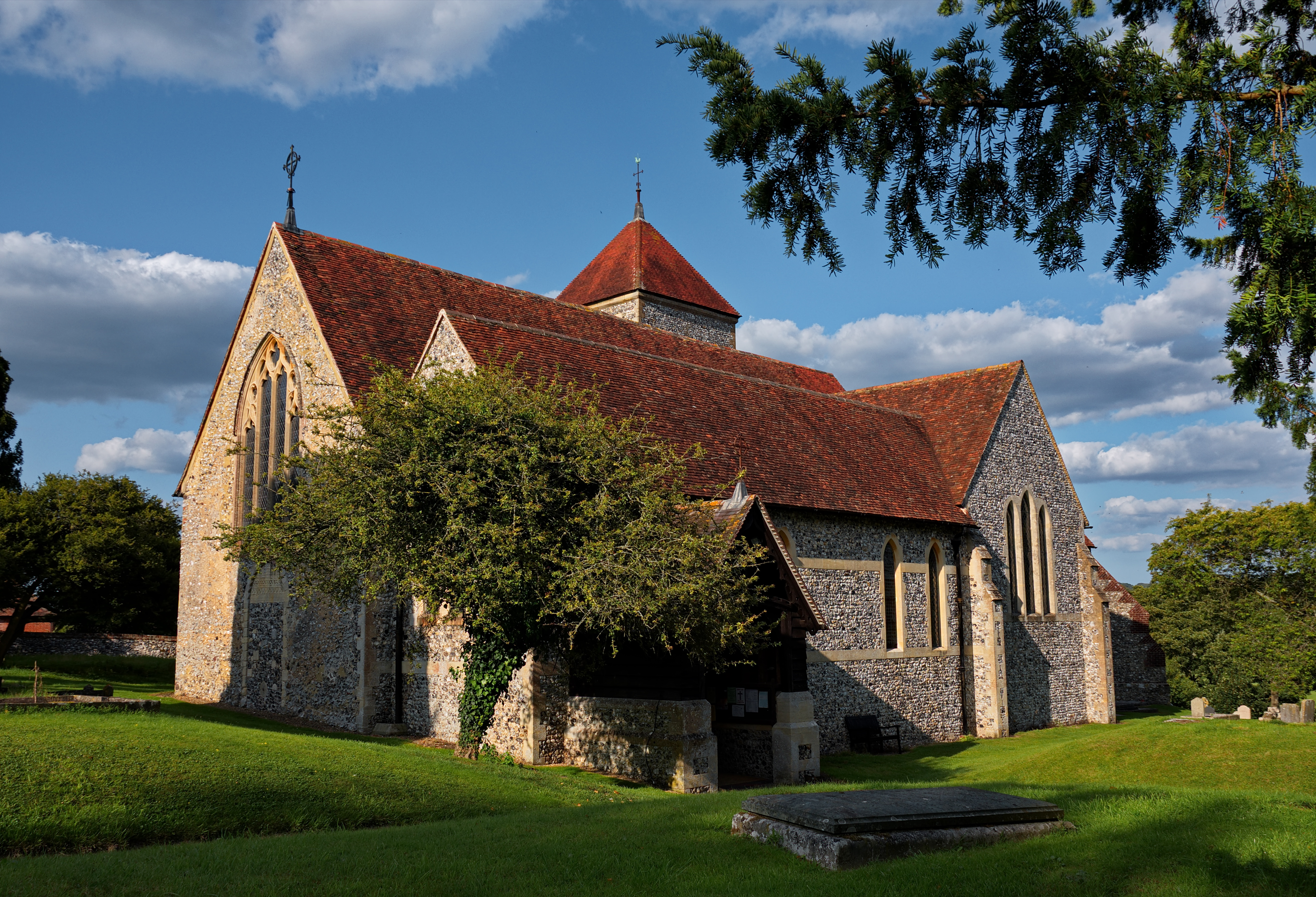
- St Lawrence's Church, Godmersham

- Location within Kent
- Area: 15.7 km^{2} (6.1 sq mi)
- Population: 376 (Civil Parish 2011)
  - Density: 24/km^{2} (62/sq mi)
- OS grid reference: TR066506
- Civil parish: Godmersham
- District: Ashford
- Shire county: Kent
- Region: South East
- Country: England
- Sovereign state: United Kingdom
- Post town: CANTERBURY
- Postcode district: CT4
- Dialling code: 01227
- Police: Kent
- Fire: Kent
- Ambulance: South East Coast
- UK Parliament: Weald of Kent

Godmersham is a village and civil parish in the Ashford District of Kent, England. The village straddles the Great Stour river where it cuts through the North Downs and its land is approximately one third woodland, all in the far east and west on the escarpment of the North Downs. It is six miles north-east of Ashford on the A28 road midway between Ashford and Canterbury in an Area of Outstanding Natural Beauty with the North Downs Way and Pilgrims' Way traversing the parish.

The village is divided in two by the floodplain of the Stour. The parish civil includes Godmersham village itself, and Bilting. It shares many of its activities with the neighbouring parish of Crundale, a smaller parish to the east.

== History ==
The first known record of Godmersham was AD824 when Beornwulf, King of Mercia, gave it as a whole to Wulfred, Archbishop of Canterbury. The village also is recorded in the Domesday Book. Bilting is thought to be older.

Although a significant number of residents work on the land, many work in Ashford, Canterbury and further afield, while some commute to London by train from Wye station. The village school in The Street closed in 1946 and the shop/post office in 1982. It is many years since there was a public house in the village.

== Saint Lawrence Church ==
The ancient parish church is dedicated to St Lawrence the Martyr, it is part Saxon, part 12th-century (Norman), and was restored in 1864, it contains a carving considered to be one of the earliest representations of Thomas Becket.

== Godmersham Park ==
Godmersham Park House was built in 1732 and eventually became the property of Edward Austen Knight, brother of Jane Austen who was known to have visited often. Her novel Mansfield Park depicts similar characters and scenes as those visible at the start of the 19th century, and in the case of architecture still present. The house is currently the home of the Association of British Dispensing Opticians College. A drawing of Godmersham Park appears as the background of the £10 note that entered circulation in 2017, which features a portrait of Austen.

== Notable residents ==
- Samuel Pegge, Antiquarian, Vicar of Godmersham 1730–1750.

== In popular culture ==
Author Russell Hoban repurposes Godmersham as "Good Mercy" in his 1980, post apocalyptic novel Riddley Walker.

== See also ==
- Listed buildings in Godmersham
