= Wolfstein =

Wolfstein may refer to

Places:

- Wolfstein, Rhineland-Palatinate, a municipality in Rhineland-Palatinate, Germany
- Wolfstein (Verbandsgemeinde), in Rhineland-Palatinate, Germany
- Wolfstein (principality), a minor principality in the Holy Roman Empire
- Wolfstein Castle former castle in Freyung, Lower Bavaria
- New Wolfstein Castle, a ruined castle above the town of Wolfstein, Rhineland-Palatinate

People:

- Rosi Wolfstein (1888-1987), German politician
- A character in the 1968 horror film The Mark of the Wolfman

Other:

- Wolfstein (book), an 1822 chapbook based on Percy Bysshe Shelley's 1811 Gothic horror novel St. Irvyne
- Wolfstein, the Murderer, an 1850 chapbook based on Percy Bysshe Shelley's 1811 Gothic horror novel St. Irvyne
- Wolfstein, an album by Chilly Gonzales

== See also ==
- Wolfenstein (disambiguation)
