= Vardill =

Vardill is a surname. Notable people with the surname include:

- Anna Jane Vardill (1781–1852), British poet
- John Vardill (1749–1811), American educator
