= Charlotte Dacre =

English novelist (1771/1772–1825)

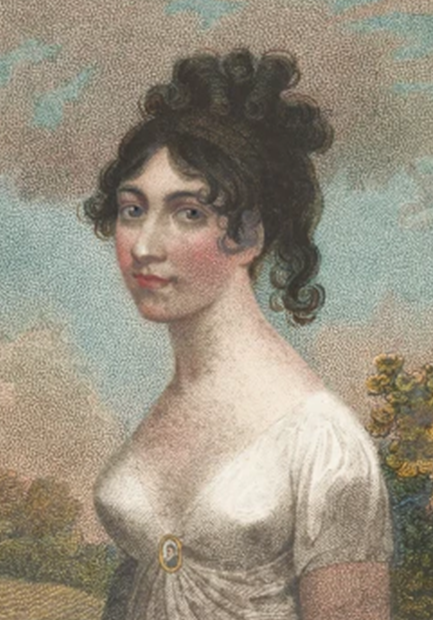
- Portrait for Hours of Solitude (1805)
- Born: Unknown
- Died: 7 November 1825
- Occupations: Novelist; poet
- Relatives: Sophia King (sister)
- Writing career
- Pen name: Rosa Matilda
- Notable work: Zofloya

Charlotte Dacre (17? (Note: Dacre and her sister Sophia King's births were not registered, and thus her year of birth has been disputed by scholars, ranging from 1771 to 1782. Dacre herself claimed to be 23 in her introduction notice in Hours of Solitude (1805). Upon her death in 1825 her age was listed as 53, however author Michael Henry Scrivener notes in Jewish Representation in British Literature 1780–1840 that her husband Nicholas Byrne may have provided an older age to mask the fact he was two decades older than her.) – 7 November 1825), born Charlotte King, was a British Gothic novelist, and poet. Most references today are given as Charlotte Dacre, but she first wrote under the pseudonym "Rosa Matilda" and later adopted a second pseudonym to confuse her critics. She became Charlotte Byrne upon her marriage to Nicholas Byrne in 1815. Dacre published four novels, and three books of poetry, one co-authored with her sister Sophia King. Her novels are Confessions of the Nun of St. Omer (1805), Zofloya (1806), The Libertine (1807) and The Passions (1811).

== Life ==
Dacre was one of three legitimate children of John King, born Jacob Rey (c. 1753–1824), a Jewish moneylender of Portuguese Sephardic origin, who was also a blackmailer and a radical political writer well known in London society. Her father divorced her mother, Sarah King (née Lara), under Jewish law in 1784, before setting up home with the dowager Countess of Lanesborough. Dacre had a sister named Sophia King, also a writer, and a brother named Charles.

Charlotte Dacre married Nicholas Byrne, a widower, on 1 July 1815. She already had three children with him: William Pitt Byrne (born 1806), Charles (born 1807) and Mary (born 1809). Byrne was an editor and future partner of London's The Morning Post newspaper where the author Mary Robinson was the poetry editor and an influence on a young Charlotte Dacre, who began her writing career by contributing poems to the Morning Post under the pseudonym "Rosa Matilda."

She died on 7 November 1825, in Lancaster Place, London, after a long and painful illness. Her husband was attacked in his office by a masked intruder, and died of his injuries in 1833.

== Work ==
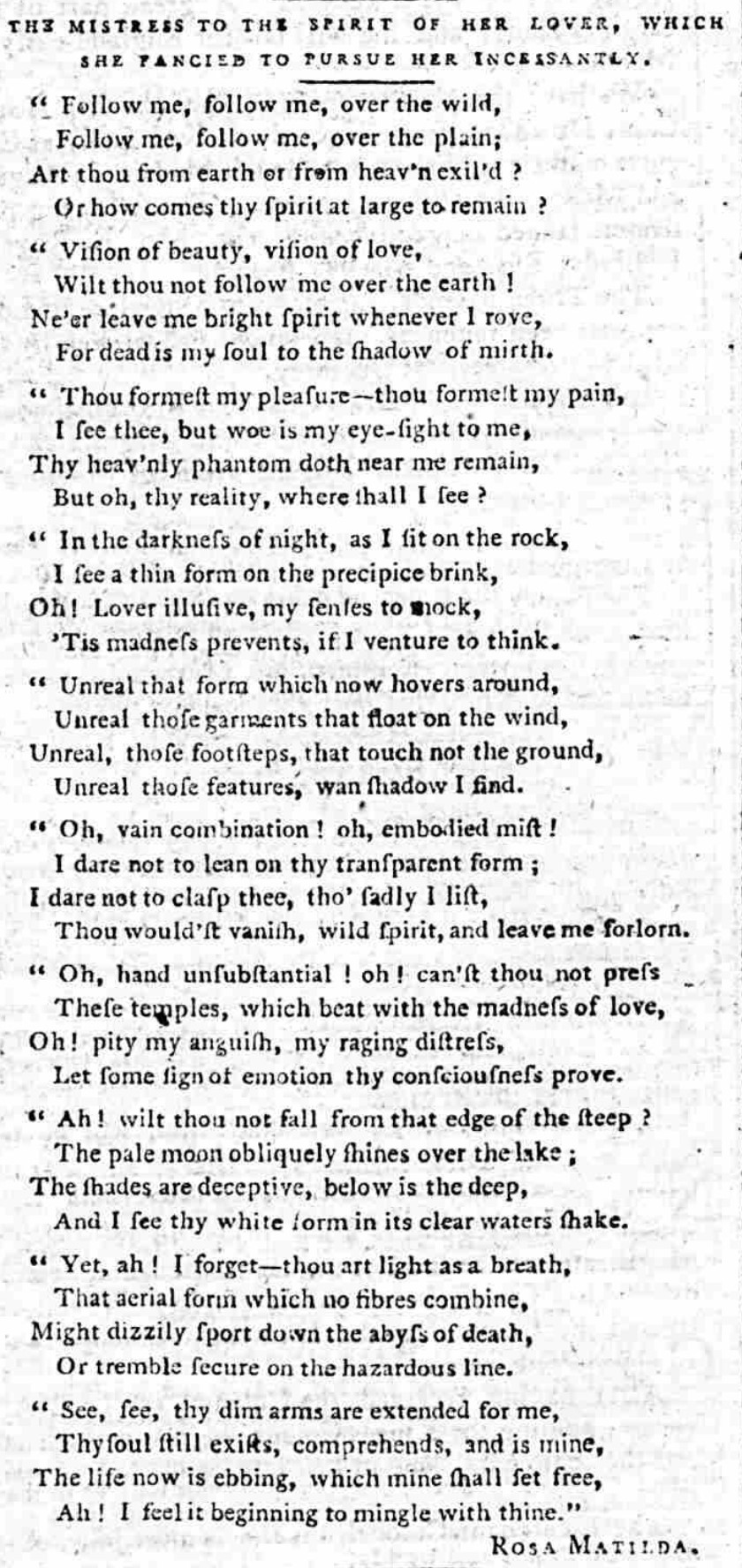
Poem published in the Morning Herald in 1803

In 1798 Charlotte King published with her sister Sophia a volume of Gothic verses, Trifles of Helicon, and dedicated it to her bankrupt father to show 'the education you have afforded us has not been totally lost'. She used some of the poems from Trifles of Helicon in Hours of Solitude (1805), published under the pseudonym Charlotte Dacre, which confirms the identity between Dacre and King. She wrote verses for the Morning Post and Morning Herald under the name Rosa Matilda. Also in 1805 she published The Confessions of the Nun of St. Omer, a Gothic tale of sexual repression and misbehaviour. In the preface Dacre claims the book was written at the age of eighteen and left untouched for three years during journeys abroad. She wrote a total of four novels: The Confessions of the Nun of St. Omer (1805), Zofloya, or the Moor (1806), The Libertine (1807), and The Passions (1811).

Of her four major novels, Zofloya, or the Moor is the most well-known and sold well on its release in 1806. It has been translated into German, French and Italian. The novel follows the corruption of the strong and sexually ruthless heroine Victoria, and her gradual enslavement to the charismatic Moorish servant Zofloya (later revealed to be Satan).

== Influence ==
Despite all four of her novels being re-issued by Arno Press from 1972 to 1974, Charlotte Dacre remained in virtual obscurity for nearly two centuries until the recovery of Zofloya in the 1990s by feminist scholars. Zofloya has since become a staple work of Gothic curriculum. Her work was admired by some of the literary giants of her day and her novels influenced Percy Bysshe Shelley, who thought highly of her style and creative skills. Shelley's first two Gothic novels, Zastrozzi and St. Irvyne were largely influenced by Zofloya. She is believed to be one of the numerous targets of Lord Byron's satirical poem English Bards and Scotch Reviewers, mentioned in the lines:

Far be't from me unkindly to upbraid
The lovely Rosa's prose in masquerade,
Whose strains, the faithful echoes of her mind,
Leave wondering comprehension far behind.

Byron had been an early admirer of Dacre's poetry, and his first volume of poetry, Hours of Idleness (1807) was largely inspired by Dacre's Hours of Solitude, including the allusion in the title. However, Byron turned his back on his early sentimental style of poetry after the scathing review he received for Hours of Idleness from The Edinburgh Review, leading to the satirical English Bards and Scotch Reviewers in 1809.

== Partial bibliography ==
- Trifles of Helicon, with her sister Sophia King
- Hours of Solitude (Poems) (1805)
- Confessions of the Nun of St. Omer (1805)
- Zofloya (1806)
- The Libertine (1807)
- The Passions (1811)
- George the Fourth, a Poem (1822)
