= Kiszko =

Kiszko may refer to:

- Martin Kiszko (born 1958), British composer.
- Stefan Kiszko (1952–1993), British tax clerk, wrongly convicted of the murder of Lesley Molseed.
