= Zofloya =

1806 novel by Charlotte Dacre

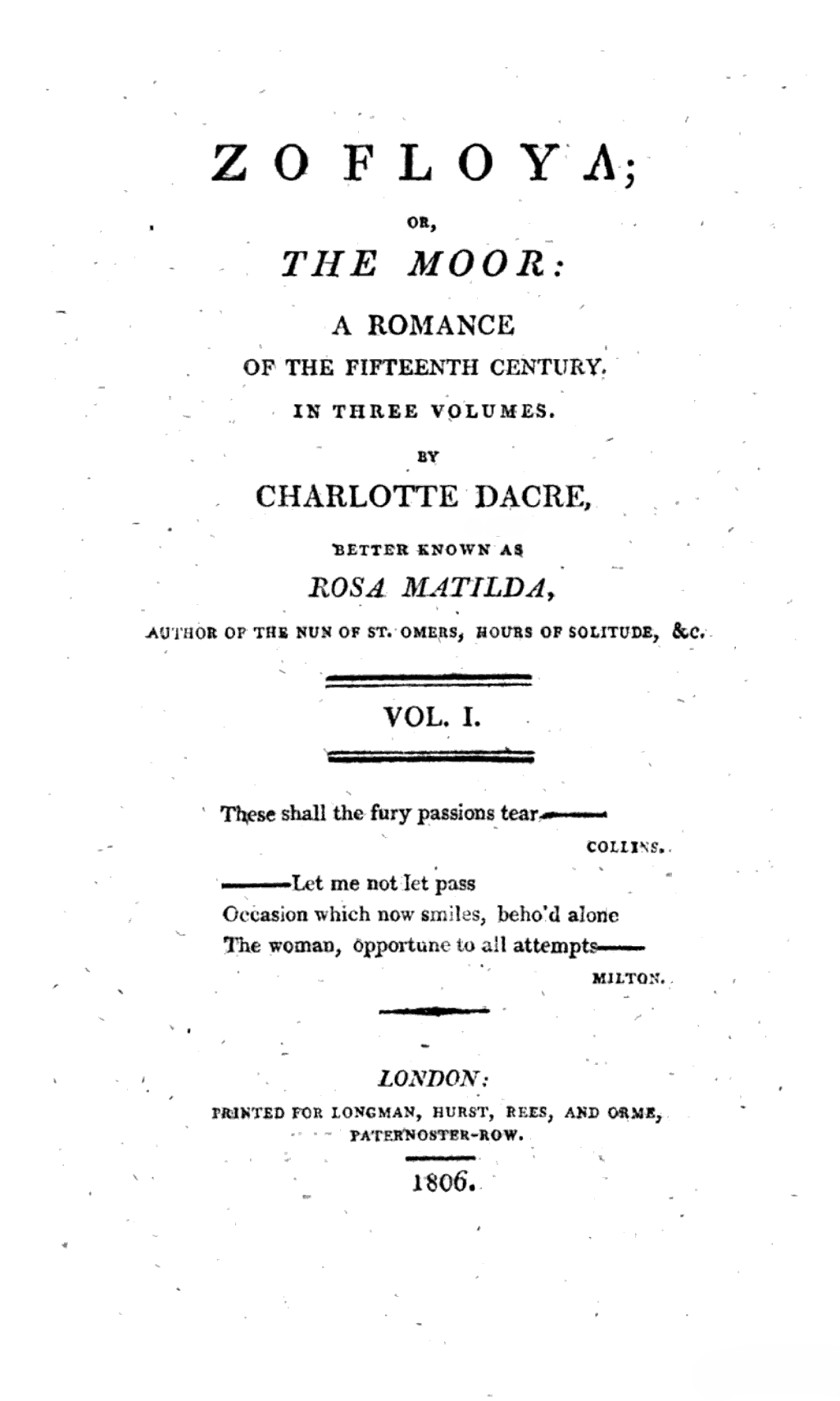
- Title page of first edition
- Author: Charlotte Dacre
- Original title: Zofloya; or, The Moor: A Romance of the Fifteenth Century
- Language: English
- Genre: Gothic fiction
- Publication date: 14 May 1806
- Publication place: England
- Media type: Print
- Preceded by: Confessions of the Nun of St. Omer
- Followed by: The Libertine

Zofloya; or, The Moor: A Romance of the Fifteenth Century, often shortened to Zofloya, is an 1806 English Gothic novel by Charlotte Dacre under the nom de plume Rosa Matilda. It was her second novel. Zofloya was published in three parts, and later collected into a single volume. At the time of publication, the novel was heavily criticised for its provocative subject matter, especially its religious and racial themes. Its focus on female sexuality was also criticised as inappropriate, with one contemporary reviewer noting the novel possessed "an exhibition of wantonness of harlotry".

Despite reprints in 1928 and 1974, Zofloya was largely forgotten for nearly two centuries until its recovery in the 1990s by feminist scholars, which led to two professional editions being published in 1997. Since then it has attracted scholarly attention, and become a staple work of Gothic curricula. Notable for its subversion of the female Gothic, in particular the novel's heroine, Victoria di Loredani, who challenges female Gothic archetypes of the period, it has been called "a significant departure from the more familiar tradition of women's Gothic writing."

== Plot ==
Victoria de Loredani is the beautiful, spoiled daughter of the Marchese di Loredani and his wife, Laurina. Victoria, her brother Leonardo, and her parents reside in a palazzo in Venice, Italy. They live in happiness until the Marchese's friend, Count Ardolph, visits from Germany. Ardolph, who takes pleasure in destroying the reputations of virtuous women and breaking up their marriages, appeals to Laurina's vanity and he seduces her away from her husband. The two disappear from Venice together. After Laurina elopes, Leonardo disappears from Venice without explanation, leaving only Victoria and her father in the palazzo. One year later, the Marchese encounters Ardolph in the streets of Venice. They duel, and Ardolph fatally stabs the Marchese. Laurina pays him a final visit, and the Marchese expresses his dying wish that Laurina will find Leonardo, reclaim her children, and leave Venice.

After the Marchese's death, Victoria falls into Ardolph and Laurina's custody, and soon meets Il Conte Berenza, a noble but naïve Venetian man. Berenza quickly falls in love with Victoria, but after overhearing her curse her mother, Berenza becomes wary of her evil character. Laurina and Ardolph do not approve of Berenza, so Laurina forges a letter in Victoria's handwriting persuading Berenza to leave Venice. Ardolph and Laurina then send Victoria to live under the tyrannical rule of Laurina's cousin, Signora di Modena. With the help of her servant, Victoria escapes the Signora's household, disguises herself as a peasant, and returns to Venice. She reconciles with Berenza, and they begin living together. Berenza tells her of his former mistress Megalena, who is known for her jealousy.

An assassin enters the home of Victoria and Berenza at night. He attempts to stab Berenza in his sleep, but Victoria awakens and defends her lover by taking the dagger in her arm instead. The assassin flees, and Berenza awakens, shaken. He is impressed by Victoria's action and no longer questions her love for him. Victoria decides not to tell Berenza that she noticed that her long-lost brother, Leonardo, was the assassin.

The book switches to Leonardo's point of view, recounting what happened to him after he ran away. First, he found shelter with the Zappi family. He fell in love with the family's daughter Amamia, but the mother, Signora Zappi, fell in love with him; Leonardo rejected her advances. Signora Zappi falsely accuses Leonardo of rape. Leonardo left the Zappi household and took shelter with an old woman, Nina, who was mourning the death of her son. Nina dies, and Leonardo is forced to move again. He returns to Venice, and catches the attention of Megalena Strozzi. She convinces him to take her as his mistress, told him of the death of his father, and begins to control his every move. One day, Megalena comes across her former lover Berenza with his new lover (Victoria). In a rage, she instructs Leonardo to prove his love of her by killing Berenza. After some hesitation, he agrees. He comes back after stabbing his own sister instead of Berenza, and tells Megalena what happened. They realise that he left the dagger there, and that Megalena's name is engraved on it. They flee Venice to avoid discovery.

The narration returns to the perspective of Victoria. Berenza is deeply moved by Victoria's loving action and decides it is time for them to be married.

Five years later, Berenza's brother Henriquez comes to visit. Victoria quickly realizes she has feelings for Henriquez, but is saddened to discover that his heart lies with Lilla. Victoria feels that she must do anything to prevent the marriage of Lilla and Henriquez at any cost. She begins dreaming about how she will destroy Lilla and be with Henriquez. During her dreams, a familiar face begins to surface: that of Henriquez's servant Zofloya, who she sees as someone who can help her destroy Lilla. During the day, she is intrigued by the handsome figure of the Moor Zofloya, and notices him catching her eye.

Zofloya disappears shortly after, apparently having been killed, but strangely returns to Berenza and Victoria's household later. He approaches Victoria and tells her to meet him in the garden. Victoria confesses her desire for Henriquez, and Zofloya claims he can help her fulfill any desire that she seeks. She is hesitant to take his help, but ultimately her desires take over her body and mind. Zofloya shares his knowledge of poisons and the two begin to plan the slow destruction of Berenza.

As Berenza's health slowly declines, Zofloya advises Victoria to change locations since she is wary of being suspected of Berenza's poisoning. Victoria, Berenza, Henriquez, Lilla, and Lilla's elderly relative retreat to Berenza's mountain castle. Victoria is impatient for Berenza to die and questions Zofloya's methods. Zofloya mentions a poison he believes will kill Berenza immediately, but first he tests the poison on Lilla's elderly relative, who does not die immediately, and must be strangled by Zofloya. After two more weeks of waiting for Berenza to die, Victoria gives him his final ration of poison, and Berenza dies; the cause appears to be a heart attack.

Berenza's death makes Henriquez suspicious. He begins to despise Victoria. In a moment of panic, Victoria confesses her love to Henriquez. He is harsh and cruel to her, but then realises that she was the wife of his brother, and he should contain his hatred for her.

Victoria decides the only way to win his love is to eliminate Lilla. Zofloya and Victoria capture Lilla and tie her up in a cave. Henriquez is deeply upset when he discovers his lover is missing. Victoria confesses her love again, but Henriquez still refuses to reciprocate her emotion. Victoria runs to Zofloya, upset that he has not helped her attain her desires. He tells her she can have Henriquez if she appears to be Lilla. He gives her a potion to administer to Henriquez, which will make the first woman he sees when he awakens appear as the woman of his dreams. Zofloya fails to mention that the illusion will only last until Henriquez falls asleep again.

Victoria gives Henriquez the potion and gets her wish of having him see her and love her as "Lilla" for a day. When they awaken in bed together the next morning, Henriquez realises that he had been wronged, and was with Victoria all night. He kills himself in response by jumping on a sword in his room. Victoria is furious with Zofloya for tricking her. In her passion, she stabs Lilla and throws her off a cliff.

Victoria realises she is in Zofloya's thrall, and he seduces her with his words. He leads her to the banditti, led by her brother Leonardo. Zofloya and Victoria live among savages, and Zofloya shows his possessive evil side when he exclaims "thou wilt be mine, to all eternity" (244); Zofloya begins showing a different side to himself, including an ability to read Victoria's thoughts.

One night, the banditti bring a woman and man into their savage home. The woman and man turn out to be Laurina and Ardolph. Leonardo stabs Ardolph and proclaims that he has finally had his vengeance. Laurina is frightened by Leonardo's actions and, as a gasp escapes her lips, Leonardo turns back his attention to her. He demands to know which of the banditti have harmed her and caused the bruises and cuts she suffer from, but they tell him that it was Ardolph had been beating her and her cries had attracted their attention. On her deathbed, Laurina begs her children for their forgiveness. Victoria refuses, but Leonardo readily forgives her. Leonardo scorns Victoria for being so harsh to their mother.

All the characters and their connecting stories come together in this final scene, and their unfortunate pasts surface. Leonardo and Megalena kill themselves, and Victoria is filled with guilt for all her past actions. She turns to Zofloya to tell him about her guilt, and instead of comforting her, he unmasks himself, thus revealing his hideous nature inside and out. He declares that he is Satan, and had tempted and used Victoria repeatedly. Victoria then gets annihilated by the Devil.

Dacre ends the story with a short paragraph, commenting on the novel. She claims that her story is more than a romance. She comments on human nature, their passions and weakness, and "either the love of evil is born with us, or we must attribute them to the suggestions of infernal influence."

== Characters ==
Marchese di Loredani: husband to Laurina di Cornari and the father of Victoria and Leonardo. He is left by his wife and later dies as a result of a duel with Ardolph (his former wife Laurina's lover).

Laurina di Cornari: mother of Leonardo and Victoria, married to the Marchese for 17 years before she leaves him and abandons her family for Count Ardolph. The children blame her for all their misfortune throughout the novel.

Victoria di Loredani: a beautiful woman who is very proud and self-sufficient. She is initially described as having an irrepressible spirit and lives a carefree life, with a twinge of a cruel nature. After her mother leaves her father, she becomes consumed by lust, revenge and temptation, which inevitably leads to the downfall of other characters.

Leonardo di Loredani: son of Laurina and the Marchese, a year older than his sister Victoria, he is "unable to resist, in any shape, the temptations of his heart". He runs away from home when his mother leaves the family, and eventually is lost entirely to the power of his mistress Megalena.

Count Ardolph: a friend of a friend of the Marchese who is shown great hospitality by the Loredani family. He has a reputation for breaking up happy marriages and introducing lust and temptation into happy relationships. After feeling attracted to Laurina, he does exactly this to her family. His seduction of Laurina tears apart their family to set off the plot of the novel.

Il Conte Berenza: lover and later husband of Victoria. He is wary of her character, but gives in to his love for her. He loses her love to his own brother, Henriquez.

Signora di Modena: a distant relative of Laurina. She is a scary woman with a long yellow face and grey eyes; her appearance is repulsive. She is the cruel tyrannical ruler of Victoria when she is captive in her household.

Catau: servant of Signora di Modena that tends to Victoria while she is held captive. She helps Victoria escape and switches clothes with her to help her disguise herself.

Signor Zappi: the husband of the household that first takes Leonardo into care. He kicks Leonardo out of his house when he his under the impression that Leonardo raped his wife.

Signora Zappi: wife of signor Zappi, part of the first household that Leonardo runs away to. She falls in love with Leonardo, even though he loves her daughter. When she realises her love will never be returned, she frames Leonardo for rape.

Amamia: daughter of Signor and Signora Zappi. She and Leonardo fall in love, before her mother fakes the rape that forces Leonardo to leave.

Megalina Strozzi: ex-mistress of Berenza and mistress of Leonardo. Her jealous and controlling manner consume her. She commands Leonardo to kill Berenza.

Nina: an older woman that Leonardo comes upon after he leaves the Zappi household. She has just lost her son and is very sad. Leonardo offers to help her out and keep her company. Nina agrees, but shortly thereafter she dies, forcing Leonardo to continue on.

Henriquez: brother of Berenza. His heart belongs to Lilla. Victoria's love for him leads to many treacherous events. He despises Victoria.

Lilla: the love interest of Henriquez (Berenza's brother.) As the recipient of Henriquez' affections, she stands in the way of Victoria's happiness.

Zofloya (Satan) The Moor: servant of Henriquez. First appears in Victoria's dreams. He claims he can help Victoria fulfill her every wish and desire. He gives her poisons to destroy the lives of those around her. In the end, he reveals his true self; he is Satan.

Ginotti: a small character who surfaces at the end of the novel as the leader of the soldiers. He is stabbed by Leonardo and used as an additional tragic effect in the novel.

Banditti: robbers that appear in the end of the novel. Leonardo becomes their chief.

== Analysis of the novel ==
=== Questions of morality ===
Critics of Dacre's times saw Zofloya as warning its readers about the consequences of giving in to temptation. William Nicholson of General Review of British and Foreign Literature, a popular literary journal of the era, wrote, "From this work we gather that ladies, who marry very young, ought to take care not to fall in love with accomplished seducers; that in case such ladies should run away with their seducers, it will be particularly incumbent on their daughters not to turn out as bad as their mamas; and more especially, if the devil should appear to them in the shape of a very handsome black man, they must not listen to him, for he will lead them from one crime to another."

However, Nicholson does not assert the novel to be a morality tale, proclaiming it as a mere "performance" of Dacre's imagination. "Zofloya has no pretension to rank as a moral work".

== Challenging feminine roles of the early 19th century ==
Throughout the novel, strong female characters make their entry into the narrative who present a different image than that of the stereotypical female role within the Gothic novel. These characters manipulate others, behave violently, and are sexually aggressive, which previously had been predominantly male characteristics in Gothic fiction.

Zofloya is known for its use of female characters who deviate from the standard notions of virtuous femininity in the early nineteenth century. The prominent female characters Victoria and her mother Laurina transgress in ways that were deemed inappropriate in this time period. Because of this, many critics consider this novel a deviation from the standard Gothic work, and characterize it as a part of the "Female Gothic". Beatriz González Moreno, an English professor at University of Castilla-La Mancha in Spain, wrote of Zofloya, "Dacre's novel constitutes a strategically crafted and singular work of complex Female Gothic that speaks to its time by challenging various established views regarding women's nature and roles".

Dacre's act of hiding her authorship behind a pen name serves as a means of distancing herself from the accusation of writing material considered offensive, devious, and inappropriate for the nineteenth century.

How the Female Characters Challenge Societal Roles
Critics argue that Dacre's female characters challenge the standard roles through:

1. manipulation of the men
2. outright rejection of sensibility
3. exploration of sexual voyeurism
4. relationship control

Victoria's manipulation of Berenza

"Her plan arranged she entered upon it gradually: her eyes, no longer full of a wild and beautiful animation, were taught to languish or to fix for hours with a musing air upon the ground…she no longer engrossed the conversation; she became silent, apparently silent and plunged in thought". (78)

Megalena as a sexual voyeur

"While unconsciously he thus reposed, a female chance to wander near the spot. She had quitted her house for the purpose of enjoying more freely the fresco of the evening, and to stroll along the banks of the lake; the young Leonardo, however, arrested her attention and she softly approached to contemplate him- his hands were clasped over his head and on is cheeks, where the hand of health had planted its brown red nose, the pearly gems of his tears still hung- his auburn hair sported in curls about his forehead and temples, agitated by the passing breeze-his vermeil lips were help open and disclosed his polished teeth-his bosom, which he uncovered to admit the refreshing air, remained disclosed and contrasted by its snowy whiteness thee animated hue of his complexion."(103)

Megalena as the dominant partner in her relationship

"With a look, wherein was depicted the blackest rage, the deepest vengeance and the bitterest scorn, without advancing a step, she continued to contemplate them; then firmly and deliberately approaching Leonardo, she seized him by the arm. So unimpaired was her power over his soul, such was the awe, a lost terror, which he involuntarily felt while sinking abashed beneath the powerful glance of her eye, that he had no power to resist the decisiveness of her action. (112)

Dacre also strengthens the dynamic of her female characters by making comparisons amongst them, specifically the comparison of Lilla and Victoria further on in the novel. Describing Victoria with, "dislike, from the very circumstance of her being so opposite [the] lovely mistress". Compare this, however, to the descriptions of Lilla as a, "beautous" and "fair" girl, the stereotypical characteristics given to female protagonists in many gothic novels. Lilla is blonde as Victoria is dark, as prepubescent, passive, good, as Victoria is the opposite...According to the code of ideology, Lilla should triumph over Victoria. The opposite occurs in this work Thus, Dacre pushes these completely opposite comparisons to further her attempt to totally invert the female-male dichotomy that was present in the 1700s and 1800s throughout Gothic literature.

== Familial roles ==
Dacre also brings challenges to the conventional familial structure that most literature, Gothic included, often presented. At the very beginning of the novel, the father-figure is immediately removed from the family portrait as a result of an action taken by the female head of house, or Laurina. Again, it was a rare occurrence for a novel to sport a woman with enough agency to literally and figuratively remove the power of the male head of house. The novel continues, giving even more power to the mother figure, for Dacre describes that, "brilliant examples of virtue and decorum...[would have] counteracted the evils engendered by the want of steady attention to the propensities of children". making note that it is the mother's character, and not the father's, that has true influence over the development of the child, and that without a good mother figure, the children will grow up without moral guidance or structure.

=== Race and historical context ===
==== Racism and the character Zofloya ====
Zofloya is portrayed as a dark-skinned mysterious character that is later depicted as a representation of the devil. One of the novel's focuses is Zofloya's dark skin, arising from sentiments of xenophobia of the late nineteenth century. "In an age that was anxiously confronting foreignness as a threat, blackness was the ultimate fear".

==== Race and interracial/cross-gender relationships ====
The novel also evokes sentiments of race and power between dark-skinned men and fair-skinned women regarding the power relationship formed between two of the main characters, Zofloya and Victoria. Victoria and Zofloya forge a power relationship throughout the course of the novel which seems to upset the dominant fair-skinned, subservient dark-skinned hierarchy. This power relationship is characterised by the Moorish character Zofloya's superiority over the fair-skinned female character Victoria.

"Zofloya reflects contemporary obsession about intercourse between black men and white women," wrote American academic Anne K. Mellor in European Romantic Review.

==== Gothic novel and interracial/cross-gender relationships ====
The gothic novel is a "safe" place to experiment with interactions between dark-skinned men and fair-skinned women. The genre of the Gothic has long enabled both its practitioners and its readers to explore subjective desires and identities that are otherwise repressed, denied or forbidden by the culture at large.

===== Zofloya and interracial/cross-gender relationships =====
The novel focuses on the heightened sexuality of the Moor Zofloya, while pairing this sexuality with the impotency of the other Caucasian male characters. "Aroused by the white male, white female sexual desire in this novel is repeatedly frustrated by that white male, who proves increasingly impotent as the novel unfolds. Count de Loredani cannot satisfy his wife, who elopes. Count Berenza, the vitiated libertine, cannot arouse or gratify his wife, and visibly wastes away before our eyes, poisoned by the lemonade he so adoringly drinks from his wife's cup. Henriquez is besotted by the pale Lilla, but is unable to consummate his sexual desire for her, impaling himself instead on his own dagger. In the figural discourse of this text, white male bodies literally become smaller, weaker, less potent".

As the story progresses, Victoria's views of Zofloya change. "Initially Victoria sees Zofloya only as her servant, the one who will carry out her wish to eliminate her husband and to seduce the rejecting Henriquez. But as the novel progresses, Victoria becomes more and more dependent on Zofloya, who repeatedly professes his own desire for her, kneeling before her, kissing her hand, preserving her bloodied handkerchief next to his heart, gently pressing her to his bosom, and insisting that she belongs to him".

==== Catalysts for anti-African sentiment in the early 19th century ====
Historical events of the early nineteenth century were responsible for perpetuating fears of xenophobia. The novel was written shortly after a major slave revolt in Saint-Domingue. The presence of this subverted power relationship in the novel paired with the demonic description of the Moorish character reflects a fear of future slave revolts. "Zofloya was written during a period of intense anxiety about slave revolt, especially the cataclysmic rebellion in Saint-Domingue".

Dacre also plays to the idea of slavery, and the tendency of violence found amongst slaves. At this time period, slavery in the Caribbean become synonymous with violent uprisings and attempts at freedom, with slaves trying desperately to flee from their bondage and owners. In Zofloya, terror is built up in the idea of the "slave's revenge", which is catalogued by the actions of Zofloya himself. Dacre builds up Zofloya's character with horrid acts and thoughts, playing upon the stereotypes often given to slaves. These evil deeds and actions, though they are contributed to Zofloya being the Devil himself at the end of the novel, actually prey upon the fear of the slave's revenge, which was an idea that had begun to develop amongst slave owners in the Caribbean. As a result of all the violence and horror afflicted upon the slaves by their owners, there was a fear of retribution that began to develop amongst the owners. It is this fear that Dacre preys upon by giving the only African character in the novel the most horrid qualities all linked with the idea of revenge, though she stealthily attempts to disguise these wants for revenge as solely Victoria's. This idea of fear contributed to Dacre's novel moving away from the characteristic definitions of fear and horror used in Gothic novels, pushing towards a new concept of fear; it was a concept of fear not designed wholly by qualities deemed unseemly to British culture during this time period, but fear based on what was occurring on an international scale in the colonies of the British.

=== Role of patriarchal power ===
As a common characteristic of Gothic novels, Dacre employs the use of characters that fit into a hierarchy chart; there are both characters of high-ranking status and characters of low status. Some critics suggest that Dacre's novel Zofloya acts as an inversion of this social, patriarchal hierarchy where the characters of lower status hold the dominant power in the novel. The reversals of the servant/ master role eventually lead to the high ranked character's demise. "Subordinates, who are assumed to be totally transparent to their beneficent keepers, are actually the location of disguised and threatening knowledge; in Zofloya, this leads to one transgression after another as social and familiar underlying use the mask of harmless, familiar submission to disguise their insurrectionary aims."

=== Knowledge, power, and sexuality ===
Zofloya makes "explicit ideological links between knowledge, power, and sexuality." One character after another is seduced, this seduction leads them to their loss of power and control:

"What allows these seductions to occur is the knowledge that the subordinates possess, both of themselves and of their superiors."

According to Burley, "The subordinate characters' knowledge and understanding about their master's sexuality allows them to use this knowledge as power to overthrow their master so they themselves become the master. The subordinates understanding of the power they possess also helps them to assert control over their superiors".

== Parallels between Zofloya and Matthew Lewis's The Monk ==
Upon publication, the novel was criticized for having a similar plot to that of The Monk, a prominent Gothic novel published 10 years earlier by Matthew Lewis. The novel "maintains a plot not remarkable for its art nor striking in its management, but so closely imitated to Lewis's Monk, as to force the reader upon a comparison between the two works, incomparably to the prejudice of the one before us".

Contemporary critics have asserted that Zofloya's title character mirrors the character of Matilda in The Monk. "Not only does Dacre reverse the gender of the principle [sic?] characters from The Monk but she also changes the race of the arch-villain, insisting on the darkness of Zofloya's skin".

Both Zofloya and The Monk were criticised in their time for employing scenes of sexual transgression seen as offensive in the late 18th and early 19th century; however, Zofloya was received with greater criticism because its author was female. "When Lewis wrote The Monk it was not welcomed, but it was conceivable that a man could write this sort of infernal thing; however Dacre's crime was greater because it was inconceivable that a woman could even imagine such horrors and use such voluptuous language", Moreno wrote.

== Critical reception ==
Zofloya was considered pornographic by contemporary critics. The Monthly Literary Recreations wrote: "Indeed we may safely affirm, that there has seldom appeared a romance so void of merit, so destitute of delicacy, displaying such disgusting depravity of morals, as the present." In conclusion the review wrote "we never read a more odious and indecent performance than the present; and would advise Rosa Matilda to keep to the humble walks of versifying for the newspapers, and to leave the profession of romance writing to females who possess more delicacy of mind, more facility of style and purity of sentiments, than she, in the present work, has exhibited."

Dacre was accused of "murdering the English language" due to her tendency of "applying extravagant language to common things".

Other critics even attacked Dacre's state of mind. The Literary Journal wrote: "That our fair authoress is afflicted with the dismal malady of maggots in the brain is, alas, but too apparent, from the whole of her production," and in conclusion notes that "it evidently appears that our fair authoress must have been strongly attacked by the disease when she wrote these volumes and treated the devil, English, and common sense so scurvily."

Critics assert that the novel intends to lay "a variety of crimes to the charge of the devil" which they assert arise not from the devil, but rather from Dacre's "sickened mind". The sexual content of the novel was discussed further because of Dacre's gender, and the shock of the content escaping from a female pen. The Annual Review wrote, "There is a voluptuousness of language and allusion which we should have hoped, that the delicacy of the female pen would have refused to trace."

Some literary critics were in favour of Dacre's characterisation of women. The Passions wrote: "Cast in a different mould than those of her precursors, her heroines do not exhibit any elegance or artificiality of diction, nor coy daintiness of mien, nor any inveterate ingenuousness of character…Miss Dacre's women are not one-dimensional beings concerned with propriety or taste. They think, feel and reason."

Some literary critics suggest that Zofloya is not a text which provides readers with any type of moral substance. Literary Journal Monthly wrote, "Zofloya has no pretension to rank as a moral work. As a work of imagination or entertainment it will be read with some interest from the immediate incidents and the manner in which they are treated. Its merits as a whole or entire composition are very slender."

Despite such criticisms, the novel sold well and was translated into French and German. According to Carol Margaret Davison, Zofloya "received little scholarly attention" although it has gained consideration in the past two decades for its gender dynamics.

== Influence ==
Thomas Medwin in his biography of Percy Bysshe Shelley writes that the novel "enraptured him" and further noted that: "The two novels he afterwards wrote, entitled Zastrozzi and Rosicrucian, were modeled after this ghastly production."

== Editions ==
- 1928, London: The Fortune Press
- 1974, Manhattan: Arno Press
- 1997, Oxford University Press. ISBN 978-0-199549-73-3
- 1997, Broadview Press. ISBN 978-1-551111-46-9

== Dacre's works ==
- Hours of Solitude (poems, 1805)
- Confessions of the Nun of St. Omer (1805)
- Zofloya (1806)
- The Libertine (1807)
- The Passions (1811)
- George the fourth, a poem (1822)
