= The Passions (novel) =

1811 novel by Charlotte Dacre

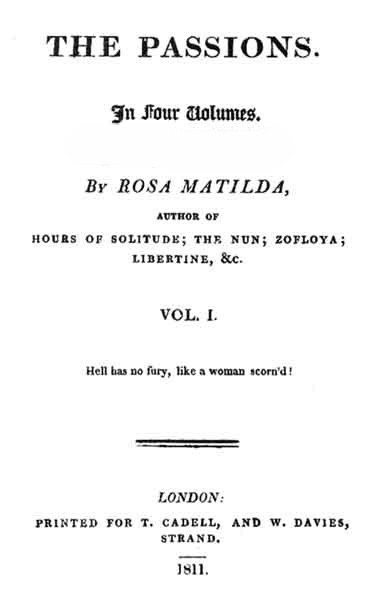
- Title page of first edition
- Author: Charlotte Dacre
- Language: English
- Genre: Epistolary novel, Gothic novel
- Publication date: 1 June 1811
- Publication place: United Kingdom
- Media type: Print
- Preceded by: The Libertine

The Passions is an 1811 English epistolary novel by Charlotte Dacre, written under the pseudonym Rosa Matilda. It was her fourth and final novel, published in four parts and collected into a single volume. The story recounts the fatal results of passion and jealousy, as a group of friends shatters due to the heroine Julia's growing desire for her husband's friend. Despite the recovery of Dacre's novel Zofloya in the 1990s, her other three novels have been largely overlooked, and received less critical attention. The novel has been re-issued twice since its original publication, first in 1974 as a facsimile reprint by Arno Press, and the most recent, and first professional edition, in 2023 by the University of Wales Press.

== Reception ==
The Critical Review wrote despite the novel's use of "inflated extravagant style of language" that Dacre "possesses power of invention, talents for description, and dominion over the feelings." The review notes that due to the "extravagant absurdity" of the language "every individual of the dramatis personae are madmen and madwomen on stilts."

== Editions ==
- 1974, Manhattan: Arno Press
- 2023, Cardiff: University of Wales Press
