= The Libertine (book) =

1807 novel by Charlotte Dacre

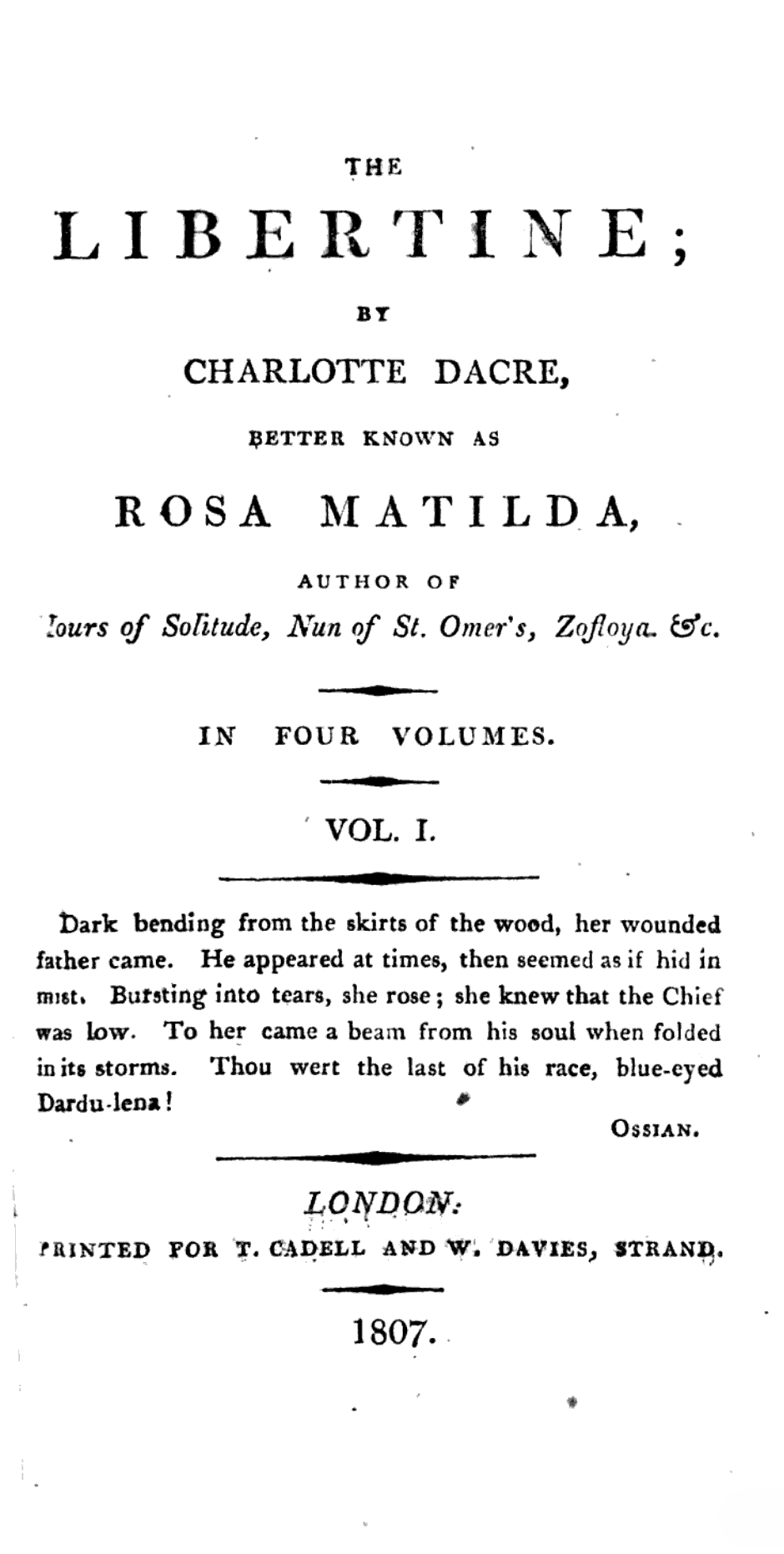
- Title page of first edition
- Author: Charlotte Dacre - pseudonym "Rosa Matilda"
- Language: English
- Genre: Sentimental, Seduction, Libertine
- Publication date: 28 April 1807
- Publication place: England
- Pages: 105
- Preceded by: Zofloya
- Followed by: The Passions

The Libertine is an 1807 English novel by Charlotte Dacre, written under the pseudonym Rosa Matilda. This was her third novel, published in four parts and collected into a single volume.

The Libertine follows the journey of Gabrielle after her seduction by a libertine and the repercussions of his infidelity and their unmarried relationship. Its themes, such as libertinism and female sexual desire, are similar to those in Dacre's previous novel, Zofloya.

The Libertine received hostile reviews on publication, with contemporary critics objecting to its potentially immoral influence on readers.

== Plot summary ==
Montmorency and his daughter Gabrielle live isolated in the Swiss mountains, away from corrupted society. They live in peace until the Count Angelo D’Abini arrives, requesting shelter. Gabrielle has never met another man before other than her father, who distrusts Angelo. Angelo justifies his motives as honest and is accepted to stay.

Still in their home weeks later, Gabrielle and Angelo have grown attached to each other but Gabrielle is confused by her feelings. Angelo is attracted to her innocence but doesn’t love her. Gabrielle shares her feelings and is embarrassed and isolates herself. Attracted to her display of innocence, Angelo pursues Gabrielle and asks her to run away with him, which she refuses. Angelo seduces her and Gabrielle mourns her loss of innocence. Angelo leaves but promises he will stay in touch, gifting a gold medallion. Eventually his letters stop.

Madam Bertrand lives alone in a cottage nearby. She is concerned about Gabrielle, now physically taken with grief following Angelo's departure. Gabrielle discovers she is pregnant, and cannot conceal it from Montmorency. Blaming himself for exposing Gabrielle to corruption, he is stricken by a melancholic madness and dies.

Gabrielle has a girl, Angus, but is continually melancholic, wishing to punish herself for sinning. Six months later, feeling that protection for her daughter can only be provided by a father, Gabrielle leaves in search of Angelo. She leaves Angus with Bertrand with the medallion, then, disguised as a man leaves.

Gabrielle finds the address she wrote letters to. Angelo is still there, and disguised as Eugene, Gabrielle becomes Angelo's page. Angelo confides in ‘Eugene’ that he has a mistress, Oriana, which pains Gabrielle. She resolves to help Angelo and ‘wean’ him off his mistress.

Oriana grows in fondness to ‘Eugene’ who acts a go-between delivering letters and flowers. During a visit, Gabrielle overhears a conversation between Oriana and her ‘brother’ Fiorenza de Vinci, who is actually her lover, who plot to kill Angelo and steal his wealth. protective of Angelo, Gabrielle sabotages their plans.

Oriana grows to fear Fiorenza and fall in love with ‘Eugene’. Gabrielle visits Oriana who confesses Fiorenza's new murderous plan. Fiorenza had hired assassins, who Gabrielle tricks into murdering Fiorenza instead. Gabrielle becomes wounded and Angelo carries her home, discovering her true identity. His passion for her is reignited. Oriana feels humiliated after discovering Eugene's identity and is filled with vengeance.

Angelo appears to be a changed man, they stay together for two years and have a son, Felix. They ask for Angus to be sent to them, but Bertrand refuses until they are married.

One day Angelo runs into a distressed young woman, Paulina whose father is forcing her to marry an abusive man. Angelo promises to speak to her father and agree to meet again. Angelo feels guilty upon reflection but does not tell Gabrielle. They meet several times, and Gabrielle notices a change in Angelo's behavior. When Angelo and Paulina meet again, Paulina says she noticed a female figure following him home, which Angelo fears to be Gabrielle. Though he respects Gabrielle, he decides that he loves Paulina.

We discover Paulina to be Oriana's vindictive sister. They plotted together to sabotage Angelo's relationship with Gabrielle. Trusting Angelo, Gabrielle claims she had no reason to suspect anything, but runs into Oriana and becomes more suspicious.

Angelo leaves Gabrielle a letter and money before leaving with Paulina but eventually realises he was deceived. Paulina leaves him, and Angelo writes to Gabrielle but does not hear a response.

Gabrielle, proudly refused Angelo's money, wishing to perish and suffer for her sins. She wishes she had listened to Bertrand and is angry not having heard from Angelo – whose letters were blocked. Gabrielle travels to London, but is denied shelter as she is unmarried. Desperate on the streets, a man gives her money. His face is revealed and she realises it is Angelo. Gabrielle faints from hunger, Angelo takes her and Felix home. Gabrielle forgives him but is wary of his promises.

Five years lapse, Angus is still not with her mother. Bertrand has married (Bouffuet) and after a year without communication, Gabrielle learns that Bouffuet became increasingly abusive towards Bertrand and Angus. Unhappy, Angus ran away. Angelo and Gabrielle try to find Angus without success.

Millborough was hired as a nanny to watch over Felix but stayed with the family as he grew older. Felix is now ten years old. Millborough is jealous of Gabrielle and tries to make Angelo fall in love with her. Gabrielle observes Millborough's intentions and asks for her dismissal. Felix misses Millborough and resents his mother, which impacts on Gabrielle's physical and mental health. She is extremely lonely and melancholic, practically bedridden. Millborough encourages Felix to distrust his mother as she is still not married. Felix and Gabrielle argue, and he leaves with Millborough.

Angelo now a gambler, runs out of money. Millborough gives him alcohol, causing him to pass out. Millborough takes him home, steals jewels and runs away with Felix. Angelo wakes realising what he has allowed to happen. Overcome with guilt, he confesses to Gabrielle. They have now lost their house to Angelo's gambling.

Gabrielle confesses her kindness is driven by her suffering and duty and not love for Angelo. Both are ill from despair and poverty. Gabrielle tries to sell her jewels, only to find that Angelo replaced them with fake ones after gambling them away. She works as a painter, but is so weak and slow that she is fired. They lie together in the house and wait for death. A message reaches them saying the man they lost the house to has died and the house is returned to them. Angelo proposes and Gabrielle accepts, though not through love. They move to the coast hoping it will help Gabrielle's health. Gabrielle sees the ghost of her father and sees it as a warning of her death. She asks Angelo to find their children and later, dies.

Angelo blames himself for Gabrielle's death and travels to France. He finds Millborough but Felix had left and stole from her. He then visits Bertrand to find out more information about Angus, which proves fruitless. On his way to England he runs into a beautiful woman who falls. Angelo takes her home and visits her most days, trying to find out if she is as virtuous as she claims to be. Angelo grabs her and as she tries to break free a medallion falls out of her pocket – it is Angus.

Angus details her story. She had run away from Bouffet, and been wandering the mountains when a Baron and Baroness took her in after their daughter. She stayed with them for seven years. They had a son, Darlowitz, who she fell in love with. Darlowitz was already promised to marry by his parents but slept with Angus before marriage. After arguing with the Baron, Angus leaves. She returned to Switzerland to find Bertrand, discovering that she had died.

Angelo blames himself for Angus’ loss of innocence. She says she cannot find another husband, as she feels wedded to Darlowitz. Angelo sends her to a convent in Italy and visits daily. Darlowitz appears in his house, now a widower. Angelo agrees that Darlowitz can see Angus from afar but when Darlowitz calls after her Angelo and Darlowitz fight. Darlowitz is fatally stabbed. Angus sees everything.

Angelo flees to Rome. He receives a letter to say that Angus is in deep melancholy, he is thankful she will die an angel.

Whilst travelling, Angelo's horse falls and he is robbed. He directs a group of men to the direction of the robber and continues to the next town. He learns the robber has been caught and goes to his trial - the robber is Felix. He visits Felix, who asks for forgiveness but Angelo says he is to blame. Angelo sits with his pistols lamenting over what he has done to those around him and commits suicide.

== Characters ==
Montmorency - Of noble birth, he is the father of Gabrielle. He wanted to escape and protect his daughter from the corruption of society and so moved to the isolated mountains in Switzerland.

Gabrielle – The daughter of Montmorency, she had never met another man before Angelo other than her father. Seduced by Angelo, she then abandons her child to find him. The novel follows her misfortune following the loss of her innocence.

Count Angelo D’Abini – An Italian libertine who is unable to commit to any woman throughout the novel. He cares for Gabrielle but is fickle in his character and leaves her repeatedly for other women.

Madame Bertrand – A friend of Gabrielle who takes in Angus while Gabrielle leaves in search of Angelo. She refuses to return Angus until Gabrielle and Angelo are married. Pierre Bouffuet – Bertrand's admirer and later husband with an undisclosed temper.

Angus – The illegitimate daughter of Gabrielle and Angelo

Felix – The illegitimate son of Gabrielle and Angelo

Eugene - Gabrielle's Alias

Oriana - Angelo's mistress, an orphan from Genova who is driven by lust and revenge.

Fiorenza de Vinci - Oriana's brother disguised as her lover with a hatred for Angelo.

Paulina/Nezzotetto - Oriana's sister, equally as vengeful.

Castro Noveli – A fisherman supposedly betrothed to Paulina

Senior Mezzetto - Paulina's ‘father’, though this is never truly confirmed.

Millborough - Felix's attendant. She is jealous of Gabrielle, loves Angelo and is keen to break up the family dynamic.

Ellesmere – The man who Angelo loses his home to after gambling.

Fitarden – A messenger

Marquis de St Evemond – A nobleman

Baron Steinhoussen – Takes in Angus when she flees her home in Switzerland

Baroness – The Baron's wife.

Ida – The Baron and Baroness’ deceased daughter

Darlowitz – The Baron and Baroness’ son. He falls in love with Angus but is promised to marry Julia against this wishes.

Julia Falkenheim — Darlowitz betrothed

== Critical reception ==
The Libertine, like Dacre's previous work Zofloya, was criticised highly in contemporary reviews. Despite this, it was reproduced in three editions in the year of its publication.

Despite its lack of supernaturalism, critics were concerned with the improbability and excessiveness of the novel. They found it too improbable to lead any form of moral message for its readers. The 1807 Annual Review and History of Literature said:

"Certainly if in the delineation of libertinism, Miss Dacre has not exaggerated and overcharged her picture, by unnatural representations, she has injured it by improbable ones. Instead of impression upon the fiction the air of truth, she has given truth to the garb of fiction."

It was also criticised for being "far from being probable" with "many striking scenes and some few pathetic ones".

Similarly to Zofloya, critics were also concerned with the lack of morality within the novel, finding that 'it is not likely that Miss Dacre should introduce her readers to a very moral society'. They were surprised that such immoral creativity was 'from the pen of a lady' given its content and, despite Dacre's comments on the necessity of marriage, were equally concerned with the reverse moral impact it would have on its readers.

'The libertine trash of a Rosa Matilda, or the illusive sophistry of the work before us, may do more mischief in one hour, than all the amiable sentiments of a Moore, a Bennet, or a Burney, can eradicate in years'

With Zofloya now receiving more modern critical reception, Charlotte Dacre as an author is now appearing in more recent works, such as The Exotic Women in Nineteenth Century Fiction and Culture and the Cambridge companion to Fiction in the Romantic Period
