= Martin Kiszko =

British composer

Martin Edmund Kiszko (born 9 February 1958) is a British composer, musicologist, librettist and poet. He is best known for his film and television scores.

== Biography ==
Martin Kiszko.

In 1986, Kiszko wrote the score for Zastrozzi, A Romance, a Channel Four Films production of Percy Bysshe Shelley's Zastrozzi. In 1996, he wrote the music for the documentary series Alien Empire, which was performed for the programme by the Munich Symphony Orchestra. In 2021, he wrote a 15-part children's podcast called King Frank and the Knights of the Eco Quest for the radio station Fun Kids.
