= Confessions of the Nun of St. Omer =

1805 novel by Charlotte Dacre

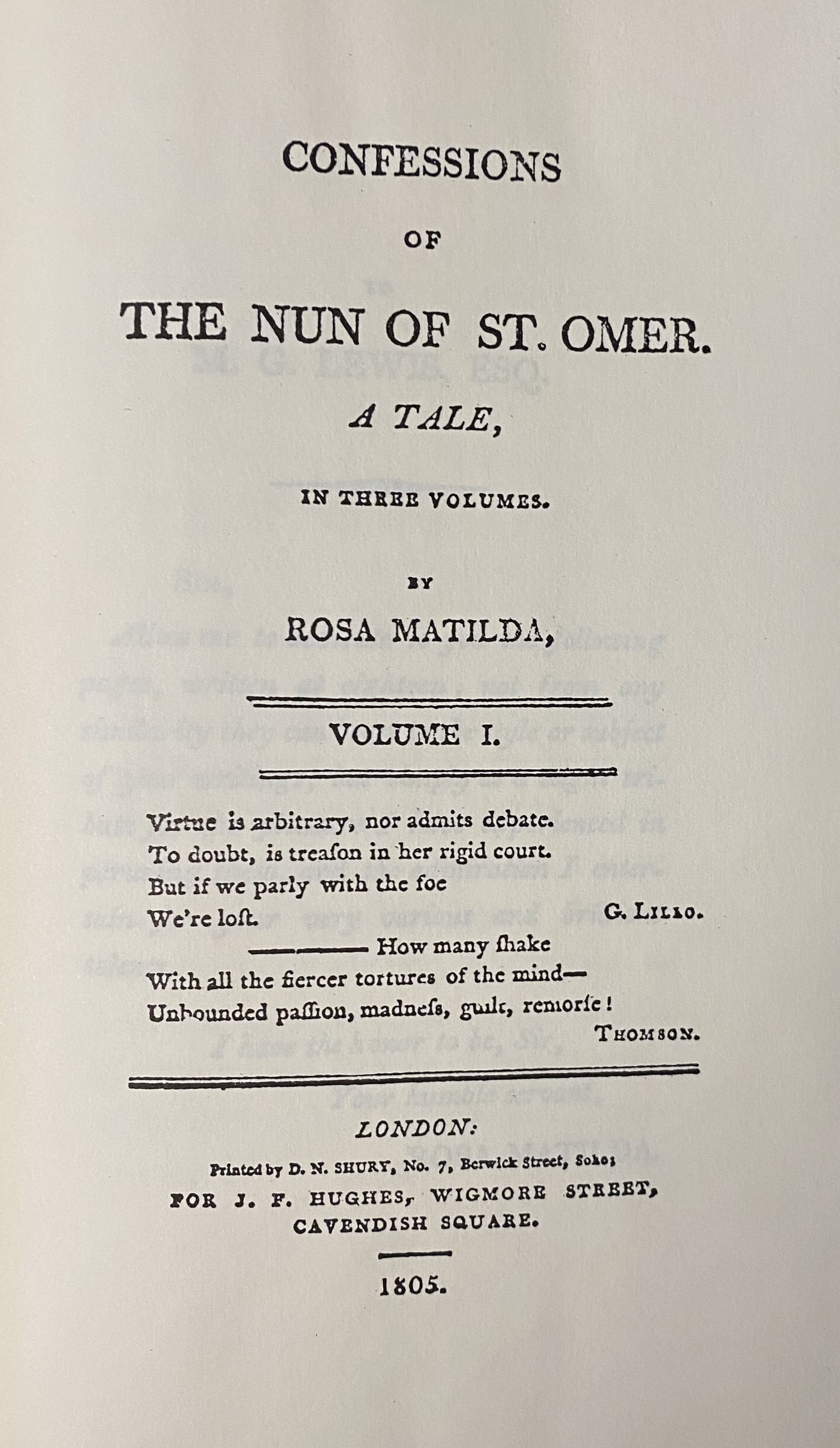
- Title page of first edition
- Author: Charlotte Dacre
- Language: English
- Genre: Gothic fiction
- Publisher: D.N. Shury
- Publication date: 5 March 1805
- Publication place: United Kingdom
- Media type: Print
- Followed by: Zofloya

Confessions of the Nun of St. Omer is the debut novel by English author Charlotte Dacre, first published in March 1805 under the pseudonym Rosa Matilda. Despite not receiving critical praise, the novel proved popular and was reprinted with subsequent editions following in 1806 and 1807. The novel, which Dacre claims to have written at the age of eighteen, is dedicated to Matthew Gregory Lewis. It tells the story of Cazire, a young woman raised in a convent who after falling victim to seduction, becomes a nun, and lives in seclusion.

== Reception ==
British Critic called the novel a "very fine, sentimental, and improbable story, written in turgid and affected language," and praised the moral of the story, which "teaches the mischiefs which arise from the neglect and violation of the social duties."

== Editions ==
- 1972, Manhattan: Arno Press
- 2006, London: Routledge
