= Sophia King (writer) =

British Gothic novelist, and poet

Sophia Fortnum (née King; b. 1781/2, d. in or after 1805) was a British Gothic novelist, and poet.

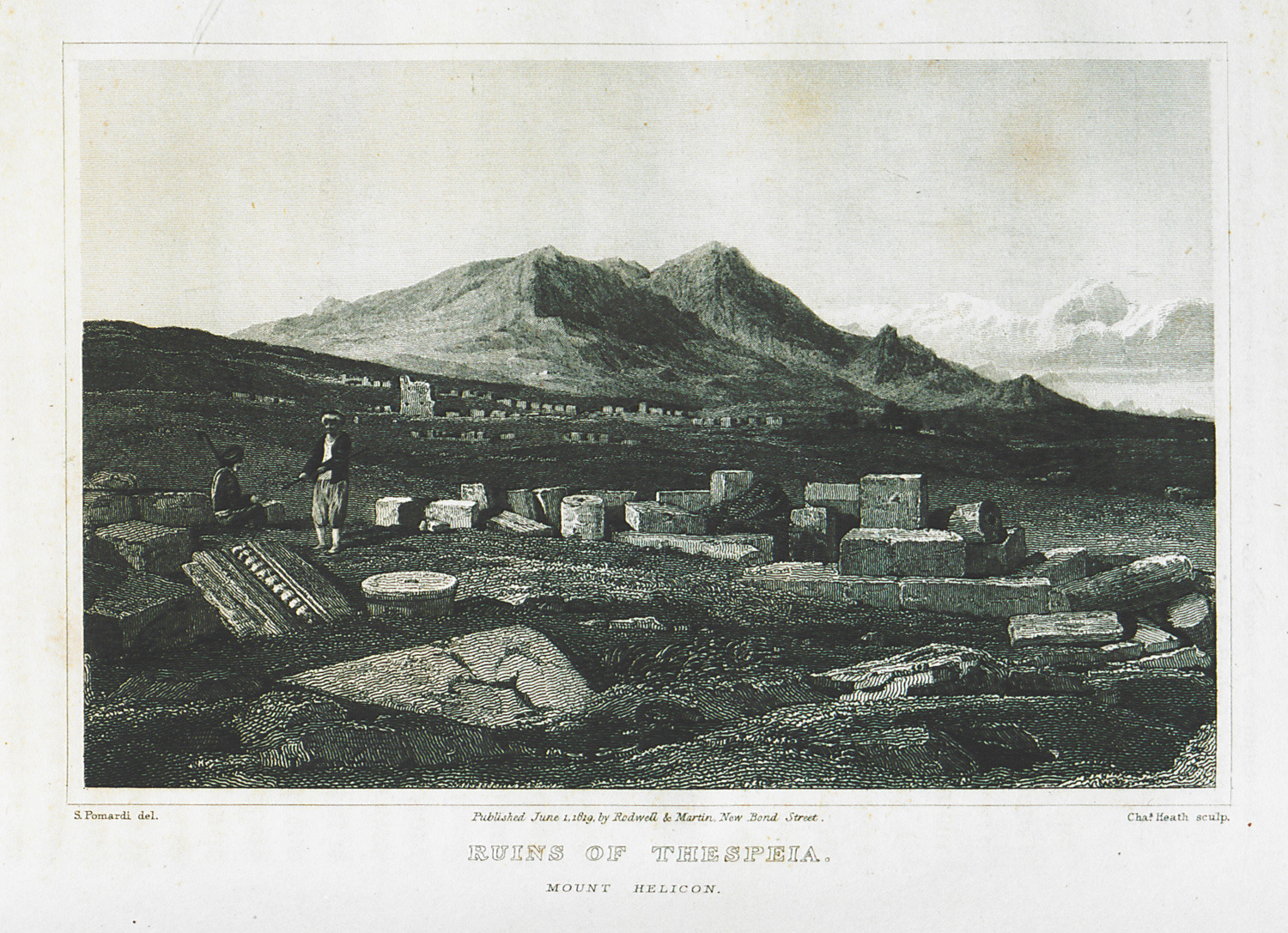
Ruins of Thespeia, Mount Helicon. Mount Helicon was considered to be a source of poetic inspiration in classic culture. From Edward Dodwell's A Classical and Topographical Tour through Greece, during the Years 1801, 1805, and 1806, Vol. ΙΙ (London: Rodwell & Martin, 1819).

== Life ==
She was one of three children of "the extraordinary self-made Jewish radical financier" John King, born Jacob Rey (c. 1753–1824), and his wife Sarah King (née Lara). Her sister Charlotte, later Charlotte Dacre (1771–1825), also became a writer. Their brother was Charles. King's year of birth is uncertain and she may have been closer in age to her sister than is generally believed. Their childhood was tumultuous as their father was involved in a series of highly publicized lawsuits and financial difficulties.

King married Charles Fortnum (1770–1860) in 1801 and had three children. Charles Fortnum was himself imprisoned and declared bankrupt, in 1804 in France. The years of both King's birth and death are uncertain.

== Writing ==
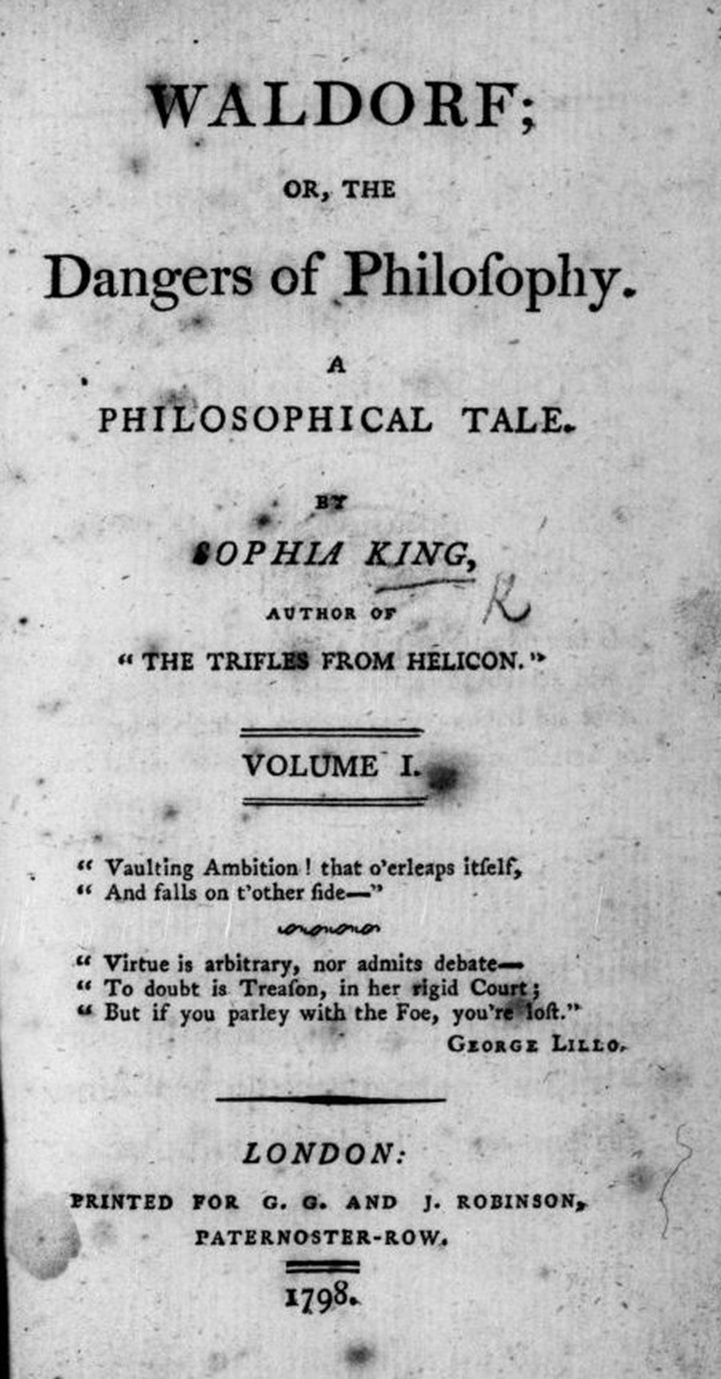
Title page of King's first novel, Waldorf; or, the Dangers of Philosophy

King's first publication was a collection of poetry, Trifles of Helicon (1798), co-authored with her sister Charlotte. In the dedication, they thanked their beleaguered father for the education he gave them, writing that they trusted that their verses demonstrated that "the education you have afforded us has not been totally lost." They worked collaboratively at least once more, when Charlotte contributed the poetry for King's twelfth-century romance The Fatal Secret; or, Unknown Warrior (1801).

King also contributed poetry to periodicals using the nom de plume "Sappho," and published a solo collection, which contained many of these individual poems, entitled Poems, Legendary, Pathetic, and Descriptive, in 1804.

The bulk of her literary output consists of her five multi-volume novels.

== Critical assessments ==
Her first, co-authored collection of poetry received "mediocre" reviews, though the circumstances — and the dedication to their disgraced father — were perhaps a factor. Both King, and her sister to an even greater extent, inspired a degree of controversy all on their own, however. A reviewer for the Critical Review commented on King's "luxuriant imagination," which was not necessarily a compliment with its implication of being untamed.

Twentieth-century commentators have often been dismissive, but in more recent years, literary critics are reevaluating Gothic texts as a separate category rather than as failed realist texts. According to the Orlando Project, "Sophia King, like her sister Charlotte Dacre, seems to use the sensational in both her poetry and fiction ... to figure her actual, excruciating family romance. Male libertinism, both sexual and philosophical-radical, is rendered fatally attractive and destructive." King herself would seem to have been considering the possibilities available to genre writers when, in the "Remarks" which preface her poetry collection of 1804, she discusses the relationship of fantasy to good taste.

== Works ==
=== Fiction ===
- Waldorf; or, the Dangers of Philosophy. A philosophical tale. By Sophia King, author of "the Trifles from Helicon." London: G. G. and J. Robinson, 1798.
- Cordelia, or a romance of real life. In two volumes. By Sophia King, author of Trifles from Helicon; & Waldorf, or Dangers of Philosophy. London: Minerva Press, 1799.
- The Fatal Secret; or, Unknown Warrior. A Romance of the Twelfth Century, with Legendary Poems. By Sophia King, Author of Waldorf, or the Dangers of Philosophy; Cordelia, a Romance of Real Life; and the Victim of Friendship, a German Romance. Printed for the Author, by J. G. Barnard, George's Court, Clerkenwell; and sold by J. Fiske, Wigmore Street, Cavendish Square, and all other Booksellers, 1801.
- The Victim of Friendship; a German Romance. By Sophia King, Author of Trifles from Helicon; Waldorf, or the Dangers of Philosophy; and Cordelia, a Romance of Real Life. London: R. Dutton, 1801
- The Adventures of Victor Allen. By Mrs. Fortnum, (Late Sophia King,), Author of Waldorf, or the Dangers of Philosophy; Cordelia, A Romance of Real Life; The Victim of Friendship, A German Romance; The Fatal Secret, or Unknown Warrior; &c. In Two Volumes. London: W. Hodgson, 1805.

=== Poetry ===
- Co-authored with Charlotte Dacre. Trifles of Helicon. By Charlotte and Sophia King. London: James Ridgway, 1798.
- Poems, Legendary, Pathetic, and Descriptive. By Mrs. Fortnum (late Sophia King). London: Printed by Susannah Burchett, 1804.

== Resources ==
- Baines, Paul. "Fortnum [née King], Sophia (b. 1781/2, d. in or after 1805), writer." Oxford Dictionary of National Biography. 08. Oxford University Press. Accessed 2022-07-15.
- Clery, E. J. Women's Gothic: from Clara Reeve to Mary Shelley. Tavistock, 2000. (Internet Archive)
- "King Fortnum, Sophia" The Women's Print History Project, 2019, Person ID 2466. Accessed 2022-07-15. (WPHP)
- "Sophia King." Orlando: Women’s Writing in the British Isles from the Beginnings to the Present. Accessed 2022-07-15. (Orlando)
