= Zastrozzi, The Master of Discipline =

1977 play by George F. Walker

The cover of the first edition, 1979. Bernardo and Zastrozzi.

Zastrozzi, The Master of Discipline is a play by Canadian playwright George F. Walker, first produced at Toronto Free Theatre in 1977. It is loosely based upon the 1810 novel Zastrozzi: A Romance by Percy Bysshe Shelley.

== Plot and characters ==
The major characters and the plot of the play are nearly identical to the 1810 novel Zastrozzi by Percy Bysshe Shelley.

The play is set in 1893. Zastrozzi, the master criminal in all of Europe and an atheist, like the character in the 1810 novel and Shelley himself, has focused for nearly three years on the pursuit of revenge against his mother's murderer: the whimsical, inconstant, and delusively God-obsessed artiste Verezzi. In the Shelley novel, Zastrozzi's mother Olivia was seduced and impregnated by Verezzi's father when she was fifteen. Zastrozzi is the illegitimate son and Verezzi is his half-brother. Olivia dies at thirty in poverty and abandoned, demanding that Zastrozzi avenge her. In both the novel and the play, Zastrozzi, with the help of his heartless protégé Bernardo and his sometime lover, the seductress Matilda, chases Verezzi to a small town in the Italian countryside and engineers an elaborate plot to destroy his enemy. While Verezzi may be an easy target, his tutor Victor, a former priest, presents a much more difficult challenge for Zastrozzi.

The play retains all the major characters of the Shelley novel: Zastrozzi, Verezzi, Julia, Matilda, Bernardo, and the Priest (Victor). The plot is the same in both works, and Matilda serves the same role. The novel and play take place in Italy. The same themes are addressed in both works: Atheism, revenge, the ethical and moral debates, and issues relating to retribution.

== Plot summary ==
Zastrozzi, a criminal, seeks to avenge the death of his mother for which he blames Verezzi, a quixotic, eccentric, and delusional artist. He pursued his Verezzi for three years before finally locating him. Verezzi is protected by a tutor, Victor, who made a promise to Verezzi's father that he would look after him. Zastrozzi's partner and protégé Bernardo is assigned to murder Victor, while Zastrozzi saves Verezzi for himself.

Zastrozzi, however, is not content to kill Verezzi. Zastrozzi, instead, seeks to force Verezzi to commit suicide. Verezzi is devoutly religious while Zastrozzi is a strident atheist. By killing himself, Verezzi would achieve eternal damnation based on the Christian religious precepts he upholds. Zastrozzi sees this as a supreme form of revenge. Zastrozzi wants to torture and punish Verezzi. Zastrozzi is an atheist and nihilist for whom "life is a series of totally arbitrary and often meaningless events".

To manipulate Verezzi to commit suicide, Zastrozzi employs Matilda to seduce him. "Entrap him, then destroy him," he says. Verezzi, meanwhile, has met Julia. He proposes marriage to her, but she declines. Julia is the opposite of Matilda in temperament and character. Matilda is to be the third person in this triangle.

Verezzi has assumed a messianic mission, advocating love and human kindness. He regards himself as a saint. He is awaiting his 454 followers, which include swans and caterpillars. It is not clear whether he is pretending to be insane to throw off his pursuer. He is oblivious to the threat that Zastrozzi poses, regarding him as a "phantom" who does not exist.

Walker retains the major characters and key themes of the Shelley novel. He changes the setting to 1893 Italy and adds the new character, Victor. The themes are good versus evil, atheism and religiosity, obsession and pursuit, revenge and murder, and man overreaching the boundaries of morality to become a new Prometheus - a Miltonian Satan. Zastrozzi, Bernardo, Matilda, and Victor are also adept at swordplay which is a key element of the action. The sets are a combination of a "Piranesi prison drawing" and the ruins of an ancient city. He retains the Gothic elements of lightning and thunderstorms and swords and daggers as weapons.

Another theme is the nature of art. Who should be the judge of its merit or worth? Should there be accountability? Zastrozzi has an artist killed because of his alleged mediocrity "To prove that even artists must answer to somebody."

Zastrozzi attacks the Belle Epoque or the Beautiful Age in European history. Zastrozzi explains his symbolic mission: "I am what I am. The force of darkness. The sane, clear voice of negative spirituality." He seeks to destroy mankind and the world because they are "weak" and "ugly".

Victor tells him that a new century is approaching that will usher in a new world that is better, more humane and civilized. Zastrozzi replies that the new era will not be better and that understanding this fundamental truth is better: "Understanding the truth is understanding that the force of darkness is constant."

Zastrozzi describes his objective: "It is my responsibility to spread out like a disease and purge. And by destroying everything make everything safe. Alive. Untouched by expectation. Free of history. Free of religion. Free of everything."

== Reception ==
The play received generally positive reviews on its debut in 1977. Bryan Johnson of the Globe and Mail: "As swift and as clean as a rapier through the guts ... with a vigor and a power that are damn near irresistible." Sandra Souchotte, CBC Radio: "Its a cunning cocktail of a play, laced with strychnine." Gina Mallett, Toronto Star: "Zastrozzi, the satan of Europe ... skimpily dressed in black leather and armoured with lethal hardware ... in Toronto's own grand guignol show." Myron Galloway, Montreal Star: "... literate, well-constructed, theatrically effective ... by a playwright who obviously knows what he's doing. Zastrozzi may easily be classified as a unique theatrical triumph."

The play was published in a book format in 1979 in Toronto. The cover featured the sword fight between Bernardo and Zastrozzi. Zastrozzi: "Draw you sword, Bernardo. Let us have the formality of a contest. But know now that you are dead." In the first production of the play in Toronto in 1977, Stephen Markle played Zastrozzi and George Buza played Bernardo.

William Lane, the director of the original production in 1977, focused on the moral theme of the play: "Zastrozzi dares to take on the larger moral concerns of all great literature." He observed that Walker's "new fascination with the nature of evil has given a new theatricality to his dramatic statements". It is the exploration of the nature of evil which defines the play: "It's this very fascination with the inmost workings of evil which fires the play."

In 1994, the play was included in the collection Shared Anxiety, Selected Plays by George F. Walker.

== Revivals ==
The play has had several revivals, including one in the 2009 season of the Stratford Shakespeare Festival at the Studio Theatre. It was directed by Jennifer Tarver and starred Rick Roberts as "Zastrozzi", Oliver Becker as "Bernardo", Sarah Orenstein as "Matilda", John Vickery as "Victor", Andrew Shaver as "Verazzi" and Amanda Lisman as "Julia".

The play remains in continuous production throughout the world.

A production was staged for the 2022–2023 season by the Kitchener-Waterloo Little Theatre in Waterloo, Ontario, Canada in 2023. The Live Five Independent Theatre of Saskatoon, Saskatchewan, Canada performed the play in the 2024-2025 season 21.

== Sources ==
- Walker, George F. Zastrozzi. The Master of Discipline. A Melodrama. Toronto: Playwrights Co-op, 1979.
- Walker, George F. Shared Anxiety. Selected Plays. Toronto: Coach House Press, 1994.
- "Stratford Shakespeare Festival - Zastrozzi". 2009-03-12. Archived from the original on March 12, 2009.
- Nestruck, J. Kelly. "A little air and the show would soar." August 25, 2009. The Globe and Mail. 2009 Review of Stratford Shakespeare Festival production. Retrieved 6 July 2025.
- Tannenbaum, Perry. "The swordplay's the thing in Zastrozzi, The Master of Discipline. CAST brings another saucy production". 2012 production by the Carolina Actors Studio Theatre, Charlotte, NC. 2 August 2012.
