= Zastrozzi, A Romance =

- Based on: Zastrozzi by Percy Bysshe Shelley
- Screenplay by: David G. Hopkins
- Directed by: David G. Hopkins
- Starring: Tilda Swinton; Mark McGann; Geff Francis; Max Wall; Yvonne Bryceland
- Composer: Martin Kiszko
- Country of origin: United Kingdom
- Original language: English
- No. of series: 1
- No. of episodes: 4

Production
- Producers: Lindsey C. Vickers, David Lascelles
- Running time: 52 minutes
- Production company: Channel Four Films

Original release
- Network: Channel 4
- Release: 13 April – 4 May 1986

Zastrozzi, A Romance is a 1986 four-part British television miniseries starring Tilda Swinton, Mark McGann, and Max Wall based on Percy Bysshe Shelley's 1810 eponymous Gothic horror novel. It was produced by Channel Four Films and shown on Channel 4 in the UK and on PBS in the U.S. It was written and directed by David G. Hopkins.

== Plot ==
The plot revolves around an outlaw, Zastrozzi, who seeks revenge against his half-brother, Verezzi, whom he kidnaps and tortures. The story is about revenge and obsession. Zastrozzi seeks the death of Verezzi motivated by revenge. He works with Matilda to destroy Verezzi's relationship with Julia, whom Verezzi intends to marry. They concoct a deception that Julia is dead. Verezzi believes the lie. He becomes vulnerable to Matilda's seduction. When Verezzi discovers that Julia is not dead, staggered by his betrayal, he kills himself. Matilda kills Julia in retaliation.

The setting and time period have been changed from 1810 Munich, Passau, and Venice to 1986 England. All of the major characters have been retained.

== Cast and characters ==
2018 DVD release.

- Geff Francis as Zastrozzi, an outlaw and a criminal
- Mark McGann as Verezzi, a victim of Zastrozzi's revenge
- Tilda Swinton as Julia, the intended wife of Verezzi
- Hilary Trott as Matilda, seduces Verezzi in plan concocted with Zastrozzi
- Matthew Zajac as Ugo, works for Zastrozzi
- Bernard Padden as Bernardo, works for Zastrozzi
- Max Wall as Oliver the Priest, an irreverent priest
- Yvonne Bryceland as Claudine, a wheel-chair bound elderly woman
- David Trevena as the Doctor
- Maxine Audley as Bianca
- Chris Barrie as the Waiter

== Episodes ==
No.	Title	Original release date
1	"Chapter One: Capture"	13 April 1986
Verezzi is abducted by Ugo and Bernardo, two henchmen working for the mysterious outlaw Zastrozzi. He is able to escape.
2	"Chapter Two: Conspiracy"	20 April 1986
Verezzi is befriended by Claudine. Zastrozzi and Matilda conspire to manipulate Verezzi. They keep him under their control.
3	"Chapter Three: Seduction"	27 April 1986
Matilda informs Verezzi that Julia is dead. He then succumbs to her advances.
4	"Chapter Four: Murder"	4 May 1986
Verezzi discovers that Julia is alive. He kills himself because he regards his romance with Matilda as a betrayal. Outraged, Matilda kills Julia.

== Reception ==
The miniseries was shown on British television in 1986 on Channel 4. It was also shown on American television on PBS in a version by WNET on the "Channel Crossings" program. In 1990, Jeremy Isaacs named the dramatisation of Zastrozzi as one of the 10 programmes of which he was most proud during his tenure as Channel 4's chief executive.

John J. O'Connor reviewed the miniseries in the New York Times when it debuted on PBS in the U.S. on 16 October 1986. He characterized the production as “admirably adventurous and provocative” and deemed it "a strange and imaginative film".

A soundtrack album featuring the film score composed by Martin Kiszko was released in 2017.

The complete four-part mini-series was released on DVD by Simply Media on two discs on October 8, 2018, in the UK.
