= Wolfstein, the Murderer =

1850 chapbook by Percy Bysshe Shelley

Wolfstein, the Murderer; or, The Secrets of a Robber's Cave is an 1850 chapbook based on Percy Bysshe Shelley’s 1811 Gothic horror novel St. Irvyne; or, The Rosicrucian.

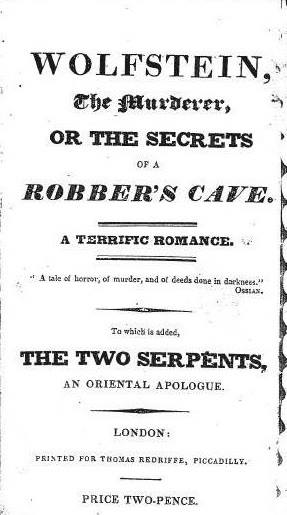
Title page. London: Thomas Redriffe. 1850.

== Background ==
The 1811 novel St. Irvyne, or, The Rosicrucian was republished by John Joseph Stockdale in 1822 following Shelley’s death. Two chapbooks were also published based on the novel. No publication date appeared on the title page. The first chapbook version was entitled Wolfstein; or, The Mysterious Bandit and was published and printed by John Bailey at 116, Chancery Lane in London in 1822. The chapbook was a condensed version of the novel in 20 pages. The total length was 28 pages including the second story. Chapbooks were meant for popular consumption, serving the same function as a paperback would. The chapbook sold for sixpence.

Another more condensed twelve-page chapbook was published in 1850 by Thomas Redriffe in London entitled Wolfstein, the Murderer; or, The Secrets of a Robber's Cave: A Terrific Romance. To which is Added, The Two Serpents, an Oriental Apologue. The Ossian epigraph appeared on the title page: "A tale of horror, of murder, and of deeds done in darkness." Printed for Thomas Redriffe, Piccadilly. The price was "Two Pence". Printed by William Bethell, 10, Marshall-street, Liverpool. No date of publication appeared on the title page. The story was six pages long, pages three through eight. The second story was four pages long, pages nine through twelve.

The frontispiece consisted of a drawing of Wolfstein confronted by a skeleton struck by lightning. He stands over the corpse of Serena. The drawing is a more condensed version of the 1822 frontispiece. The caption reads: "Deeper grew the gloom of the cavern, and darkness seemed to press around him. Suddenly a flash of lightning burst through the cavern, followed by thunder that appeared to convulse the universal fabric of nature; and borne on the sulphurous blast, the Prince of Terrors stood before him."

== Plot summary ==
Frontispiece. Wolfstein, Serena, and the Prince of Terror.

The chapbook follows the plot of the first section of the novel St. Irvyne on the bandits but omits the second part featuring Frederic Nempere in Geneva. The account is radically condensed.

The name of Cavigni, leader of the bandits, is changed to Stiletto. The name of Megalena is changed to Serena. The character of Ginotti, the Rosicrucian alchemist, does not appear.

The opening scene is of a raging thunderstorm. Wolfstein is a wanderer in the Swiss Alps who seeks cover from the storm. He is a distraught outcast who plans to commit suicide. A group of monks carrying a body for burial in a torch-light procession runs into him and saves his life.

Bandits then attack them. Wolfstein is accepted as a member of the bandits. He becomes used to a life of crime. But a rivalry develops between him and Stilleto over Serena. He decides to poison the chief by secretly placing a white powder in his wine. Stiletto drinks the poison and dies.

Wolfstein is subsequently elected Captain by the other bandits after the murder of Stiletto. He then is racked by dreams of the murdered Cavigni which fill him with dread and foreboding. Days after the murder, Wolfstein seeks to seduce Serena. He observes her in prayer. She refuses his advances and pulls out a dagger. In response, Wolfstein unsheaths his sword and stabs her to death.

Thunder was heard in the cell. The Prince of Terror then appeared before him. A “strange and unnatural stench” infused the room as “the yawning gulf of hell” swallowed Wolfstein as blue flames swirled around his body.

The final paragraph concludes with a moral of the story. Plunging into despair and indulging in crime are not the ways to confront misfortune. The tenets of morality and truth should be diligently followed. Only “misery, disgrace and ruin” result when these principles are ignored.

== Sources ==
- Behrendt, Stephen C. Edited by, with Introduction, and notes. Zastrozzi and St. Irvyne. Peterborough, ON, Canada: Broadview Press, 2002. Behrendt gives a publication date between 1815 and 1818.
- Block, Andrew. The English Novel, 1740-1850: A Catalogue Including Prose Romances, Short Stories, and Translations of Foreign Fiction. London: Grafton, 1939, p. 266. Block gives a publication date of 1820.
- O’Neill, Michael, and Anthony Howe, edited by, with the assistance of Madeleine Callahan. The Oxford Handbook of Percy Bysshe Shelley. Oxford, UK: Oxford University Press, 2013, p. 199.
- Summers, Montague. A Gothic Bibliography. London: The Fortune Press, 1940, p. 561. A publication date of circa 1800 is given.
- Tichelaar, Tyler R. The Gothic Wanderer: From Transgression to Redemption. Gothic Literature from 1794 --- present. Ann Arbor, MI: Modern History Press, 2012, "Rosicrucian Elements in Frankenstein," p. 131.
