= Wolfenstein (disambiguation) =

Wolfenstein is a video game series.

Wolfenstein may also refer to:

- Castle Wolfenstein, the original 1981 game that the series is based off
- Wolfenstein 3D, a 1992 game in the series
- Return to Castle Wolfenstein, a 2001 game in the series
- Wolfenstein (2009 video game), a game in the series
- Wolfenstein: The New Order, a 2014 game in the series
- Wolfenstein (rock), a rock formation between Tirschenreuth and Hohenwald in Bavaria
- Dr. Wolfenstein, a character from the horror film House of 1000 Corpses

== People with the surname ==
- Eugene Victor Wolfenstein (1940–2010), American social theorist and psychoanalyst
- Lincoln Wolfenstein (1923–2015), American physicist
- Martha Wolfenstein (1869–1906), American novelist

== See also ==
- Wolfstein (disambiguation)
