= John Vardill =

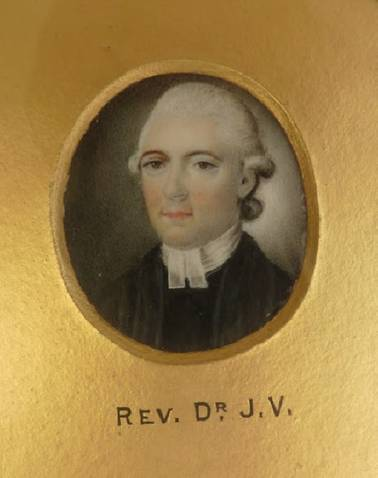

John Vardill (July 5, 1749 – January 16, 1811) was an American Loyalist educator, pamphleteer, clergyman, playwright, poet, and British spy. Though successful in writing pro British government articles, and an even more brilliantly successful British Loyalist spy, his pamphlets had little effect on preventing the separation with Britain, and his spying in the end was counter-productive and may have actually saved the Revolution. After the war he was seen as no longer useful, and too closely connected to the discredited North Administration, and was denied his expected title and compensation. He spent the rest of his life after 1784 as a country parson, and raising and educating his poet daughter.

== Life ==
=== Early life and education ===
John Vardill was born in New York City, the son of a ship's captain. He studied at King's College (Columbia University) New York City starting in 1762 at age 13, first under the President Dr. Samuel Johnson, then President Myles Cooper. He tutored other students in moral philosophy and natural law, and assisted Dr. Samuel Clossy in anatomical lectures. He graduated with a B.A. in 1766, and received an M.A. in 1769.

At age 19, beginning in January 1769, he wrote a series of anti-Presbyterian anti-Whig articles in the newspaper the Whip. In 1772, he co-authored with President Cooper a pamphlet in response to an attack on King's college by John Witherspoon, President of the College of New Jersey. He authored a series of pro-British political broadsides in 1773 supporting the Tea tax under the pseudonym Poplicola, one of which went to four imprints. From St. James's, he was appointed professor of divinity for King's College on January 18, 1778. He was also appointed assistant Minister and Lecturer at Trinity Church, New York City.

=== London ===
In early 1774, before actually acting in these new roles of professor or minister, he journeyed to London to take Anglican orders. Though he didn't know it at the time, he would be "one of the earliest exiles of the American Revolutionary War " which started that year. He received a M.A. from Oxford on June 28, and was appointed by the King a Royal or Regius Professor "for the purpose of defending the Christian, & maintaining the grand Principles of Natural, Religion, by annual Lectures on those Subjects", and was granted 200 pounds a year to sustain him in England. He advocated while in London for the appointment of a Bishop for America, and for a revised charter for King's College, supporting his former mentor President Cooper.

Beginning in 1774, still in London as the war had begun, he wrote a series of newspaper columns signed with the pseudonym Coriolanus in support of Lord North's ministry. Vardill "had a rare accessibility to the offices of the powerful" in England, and may have been more important than the Governor of New York" in influence. He lived on Downing Street and was consulted in 1778 by the Carlisle Peace Commissions. He later told a Loyalist commission that, "He devoted his time, from 1775 to 1781, to the service of [the] Government" which paid him 200 pounds a year since he could not return home.

=== The Spy ===
Sometime in 1776, Vardill was recruited by English spymaster William Eden (later Lord Auckland) and became "one of the under-secretary's three most important Agents". "Vardill's activities were centered" on Americans in England, "where he kept alert to opportunities for obtaining information or recruiting new agents." Vardill recruited an American named Van Zant, "who had considerable influence with Dr. Franklin." He recruited a Mrs. Jamp, proprietor of a bordello in Dover, and through her recruited an American sea captain name Hyson, who was on a mission from the American Commissioners in Paris, and bragged about it. Vardill thus was able to intercept important dispatches from Paris, and use the information to capture "many Vessels bound to America". Commissioner Silas Dean trusted Hyson, and so the complete correspondence between the American Commissioners and the French Court were put into the hands of the British. He also turned a Captain Deveraux, who revealed letters to American contacts in Europe. He recruited with the mistress of British-American double agent Dr. Edward Bancroft, who was Benjamin Franklin's personal secretary while Franklin was in France. Bancroft was suspected by both sides of working for the other, and Vardill provided evidence confirming Bancroft's loyalties. Vardill proved a brilliant and persuasive spy, turning agent after agent to the Loyalist British side, but his successes were in the end counter-productive and he could not prevent the Americans signing a treaty with France.

In 1780, in a series of articles called "The Alarms", and in a pamphlet titled An Address to the Inhabitants of London and Westminister Containing Reflections on the present State of Public Affairs, he attacked Christopher Wyvill's Yorkshire Association Movement, an early attempt to reform the British government, much in the same way he had attacked the opposition to the Tea tax in New York City in 1773. For services rendered, he received 500 pounds from the North Government.

=== After the War ===
With the turning of the war in America's favor, at Yorktown in 1781, Vardill realized his exile would be permanent, and that his services would not longer been needed by the government. He applied to the Loyalist claims commission in 1783 for compensation, and for his promised professorship. He claimed a loss of 1,100 pounds per year for nine years as professor at King's College and as Assistant Minister of Trinity Church New York City, though he had actually never started working at either job. As a perceived agent of the now disgraced North Administration, his claim to the promised Regius Professorship was rejected outright in 1784 by Commissioner Col. Thomas Dundas. He received only 500 pounds total compensation in 1785 for his nine years of lost salary in America. The British Government system he had so strongly and repeatedly defended in print and in espionage against his native land essentially turned its back on its most vigorous and earliest American supporter; Vardill left the commission meeting "in turmoil" with a feeling of "keen injustice", and that "after sacrificing all, he was to be granted neither the honor of the country's recognition of his commitment to her cause, nor the financial compensation simple justice demanded."

He wrote no more political pamphlets, and abandoned London and the exciting life of a spy for rural domesticity as a country parson. Though a brilliant spy in many ways, he played no part in the events of the Napoleonic Wars. He is reported to have been in Ireland in 1785 and 1786. He received the living of Skirbeck and Fishtof in Lincolnshire in 1791, remaining there until his death in 1811.

He was a published poet: The Spirit of Toussaint A Fragment appeared three after his death in the European Magazine for July 1814. He wrote at least one play, titled The Unknown, which was performed in 1819, eight years after his death, at the Surrey Theater.

== Legacy ==
As a Loyalist, "Vardill had two important distinctions. First, he left America before the bonds of social order disintegrated, and therefore did not need to base his reaction to revolution on a personal fear of violence. Second, his principles survived five years of war to be used in an English setting against the Yorkshire movement, where his response was the same as it had been in America."

As a pamphleteer his pro-British views had no effect either in America or England. His spying helped only to discredit and place under suspicion Silas Dean, who later turned Loyalist in any case. Though he gathered a great deal of intelligence, at the time "secret intelligence more often presented a puzzle which caused vacillation and procrastination" by the King and his ministers, and impeded the British government more than it helped. Some of his information did lead to the interception of American shipping. However, his most brilliant coup, the theft of the American Commissioner's dispatches "did more harm than good." The Congress never received their depressing news about the unlikely chance of a French alliance, and the Commissioner's gloomy assessments strengthened the British government's resolve to continue the war without granting independence. Both of these unintended results prevented an early negotiated end to the war that might have rejected American independence. Thus, in the end, if ironically and unintentionally, Loyalist Vardill, served his birth country better than many Patriots.

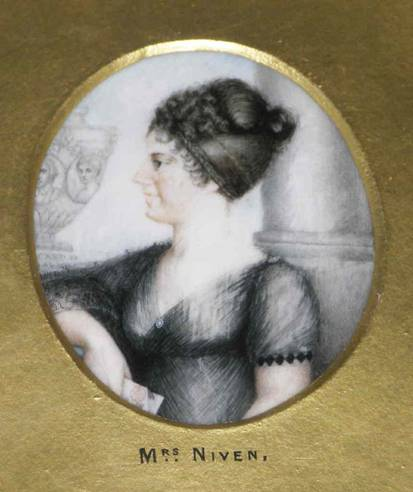

His only child was his daughter the poet Anna Jane Vardill (1781–1852), born in London. Her father was a strong influence on her education; in her first published work, Poems and translations, (1809), she states that her "most indulgent father...found amusement in familiarizing his only child with the Poets of Antiquity". In a later tribute there to him she wrote: "These and the subsequent lines are a feeble tribute to the memory of a most revered and lamented father, whose death is still recent. His keen wit and fluent eloquence were enriched by the mildest urbanity, and his profound scholastic knowledge by the most endearing social virtues. His presence was the light of his domestic circle, and gave joy to every society he entered. Ever devoting his rare talents to the purest philanthropy, he beautified religion by his example." An inscription for a memorial tablet written by his daughter was published in the European Magazine, February, 1811: if the commissioners denied his right to a Regis Professorship, his poet daughter repeatedly named him by that title, and made sure by essays, poems, and this tablet, that history would so remember him.
