= St. Irvyne =

1810 novella written by Percy Bysshe Shelley

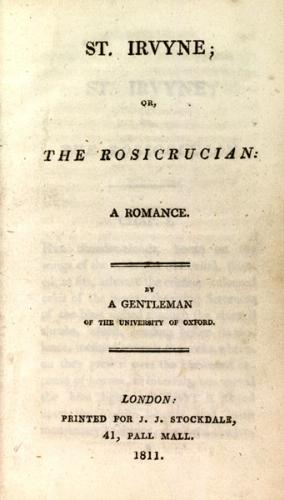
'1811' title page, J. J. Stockdale, London.

1822 republication title page.

St. Irvyne; or, The Rosicrucian: A Romance is a Gothic horror novella written by Percy Bysshe Shelley in 1810 and published by John Joseph Stockdale in December of that year, dated 1811, in London anonymously as "by a Gentleman of the University of Oxford" while the author was an undergraduate. The main character is Wolfstein, a solitary wanderer, who encounters Ginotti, an alchemist of the Rosicrucian or Rose Cross Order who seeks to impart the secret of immortality. The book was reprinted in 1822 by Stockdale and in 1840 in The Romancist and the Novelist's Library: The Best Works of the Best Authors, Vol. III, edited by William Hazlitt. The novella was a follow-up to Shelley's first prose work, Zastrozzi, published earlier in 1810. St. Irvyne was republished in 1986 by Oxford University Press as part of the World's Classics series along with Zastrozzi and in 2002 by Broadview Press.

Nicole Berry translated the novel in a French edition in 1999. A Spanish edition entitled St. Irvyne o el Rosacruz, translated by Gregorio Cantera Chamorro, was published by Celeste in Madrid in 2002 with an introduction and notes by Roberto Cueto. The book was translated into Swedish by KG Johansson in 2013 in an edition by Vertigo. A translation in Persian or Iranian was published in 2023 by Qoqnus by Mehrdad Vosuqi. A Turkish edition translated by Emre Tokcael was published by Everest in 2024.

== Major characters ==
- Wolfstein, a solitary wanderer, an outcast
- Ginotti, also known as Frederic Nempere, an alchemist, member of the Rosicrucian, or Rose Cross, secret sect
- Megalena de Metastasio, befriends Wolfstein
- Cavigni, leader of the bandits
- Steindolph, a bandit
- Ardolph, chosen as chieftain of the bandits after the death of Cavigni
- Agnes, serves the bandits
- Olympia della Anzasca, seduces Wolfstein in Genoa
- Eloise de St. Irvyne, Wolfstein's sister
- Chevalier Mountfort, a friend of Ginotti/Nempere
- Fitzeustace, befriends Eloise
- Madame de St. Irvyne, Eloise's mother
- Marianne, Eloise's sister

== Epigraph ==
The epigraph for chapter three is from Paradise Lost (1667) by John Milton, Book II, 681-683:

"Whence and what art thou, execrable shape,
That dar'st, though grim and terrible, advance
Thy miscreated Front athwart my way."

== Plot ==
The novel opens amidst a raging thunderstorm. Wolfstein is a wanderer in the Swiss Alps who seeks cover from the storm. He is a disillusioned outcast from society who seeks to kill himself. A group of monks carrying a body for burial in a torch-light procession runs into him and saves his life. Bandits attack them and take Wolfstein to an underground hideout. He meets Megalena, whom the bandits have abducted after killing her father in an ambush. After Steindolph, one of the bandits, recites a ballad about the reanimation of the corpse of a nun named Rosa, Wolfstein manages to poison the leader of the bandits, Cavigni, in a second attempt. He is able to escape with Megalena. Ginotti, a member of the bandits, befriends Wolfstein.

Wolfstein and Megalena flee to Genoa where they live together. Olympia, a woman of the town, seduces Wolfstein. Megalena, enraged by the relationship, demands that Wolfstein kill Olympia. Armed with a dagger, Wolfstein is unable to kill her. Olympia kills herself.

Ginotti follows Wolfstein. Ginotti is a member of the Rosicrucian, or Rose Cross, Order. He is an alchemist who seeks the secret of immortality. He tells Wolfstein that he will give him the secret to immortality if he will renounce his faith and join the sect.

Eloise de St. Irvyne is the sister of Wolfstein who lives in Geneva, Switzerland. Ginotti, under his new identity of Frederic Nempere, travels to Geneva and seeks to seduce her.

Ginotti reveals his experiments in his lifelong quest to find the secret of eternal life: "From my earliest youth, before it was quenched by complete satiation, curiosity, and a desire of unveiling the latent mysteries of nature, was the passion by which all the other emotions of my mind were intellectually organized. ... Natural philosophy at last became the peculiar science to which I directed my eager enquiries." He has studied science and the laws of nature to ascertain the mysteries of life and of being: "I thought of death---... I cannot die.---'Will not this nature---will not the matter of which it is composed---exist to all eternity? Ah! I know it will; and, by the exertions of the energies with which nature has gifted me, well I know it shall.'" Ginotti tells Wolfstein that he will reveal the "secret of immortal life" to him if he will take certain prescribed ingredients and "mix them according to the directions which this book will communicate to you" and meet him in the abbey at St. Irvyne.

In the final scene, which takes place at the fictional abbey of St. Irvyne in France, Wolfstein finds the corpse of Megalena in the vaults. An emaciated Ginotti confronts Wolfstein. Wolfstein is asked if he will deny his Creator. Wolfstein refuses to renounce his faith. Lightning strikes the vaults as thunder and a sulphurous windstorm blast the abbey. Both men are struck dead. This is the penalty they pay for "the delusion of the passions", for tampering with forces that they neither can control nor understand in seeking "endless life".

== Reception ==
The novel, originally intended as a much longer "triple decker" novel, circulated as part of the "circulating libraries" which were popular at that time. This was a source of revenue for the publisher of the novel. Shelley ended the novella abruptly, deciding not to develop or integrate the two strands. The result was a much shorter work.

Critics attacked the novel, which received generally negative reviews. The conservative British periodical The Anti-Jacobin Review and Magazine, in a January 1812 review, castigated "the writer, who can outrage nature and common sense in almost every page of his book". The reviewer sought to deter readers from "the perusal of unprofitable and vicious productions."

French author Maurice Sarfati adapted the novel as Wolfstein et Mégaléna, ou La Vengeance du Rosiccrucien, or Wolfstein and Megalena, the Vengeance of the Rosicrucian, in 1980.

== The Wolfstein Chapbooks ==
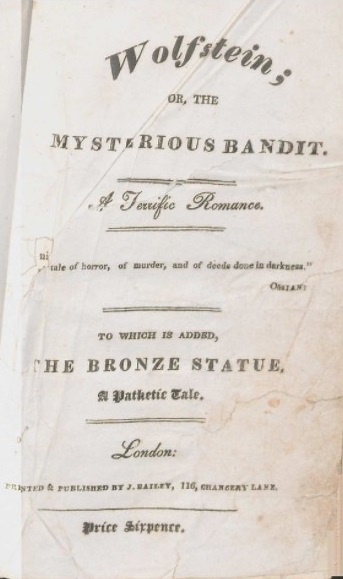
Wolfstein; or, The Mysterious Bandit, chapbook, title page, London, John Bailey, 1822.

The novel was popular enough, however, to be made into two chapbooks in 1822 and 1850. The first chapbook version was entitled Wolfstein; or, The Mysterious Bandit and was published and printed by John Bailey at 116, Chancery Lane in London in 1822 after the original novel was republished that year. The chapbook version was a condensed version of the novella in 28 pages meant for popular consumption, serving the same function as a paperback would. The chapbook sold for sixpence.

The story is described on the title page as "A Terrific Romance" with an epigraph by Ossian: "A tale of horror, of murder, and of deeds done in darkness." Added to Wolfstein was the story The Bronze Statue, A Pathetic Tale by another author, Anna Jane Vardill. "The Bronze Statue" had appeared for the first time in print as part of the "Annals of Public Justice" in The European Magazine of May, 1820, signed "V", i.e., Anna Jane Vardill.

Another more condensed twelve page chapbook was published in 1850 by Thomas Redriffe in London entitled Wolfstein, The Murderer; or, The Secrets of a Robber's Cave: A Terrific Romance. To which is Added, The Two Serpents, an Oriental Apologue. The Ossian epigraph appeared on the title page: "A tale of horror, of murder, and of deeds done in darkness." Printed for Thomas Redriffe, Piccadilly. The price was "Two-Pence".

== Sources ==
- Sandy, Mark. "St Irvyne or the Rosicrucian". The Literary Encyclopedia. 20 September 2002, accessed 12 April 2009.
- Behrendt, Stephen C. Edited by, with Introduction, and notes. Zastrozzi and St. Irvyne. Peterborough, ON, Canada: Broadview Press, 2002.
- Antippas, Andy P. "The Structure of Shelley's St. Irvyne: Parallelism and the Gothic Mode of Evil." Boyette, Purvis E., editor. Tulane Studies In English, Vol. 18, New Orleans, Tulane University, 1970.
- de Hart, Scott D. Shelly Unbound: Uncovering Frankenstein's True Creator. Port Townsend, WA, U.S.: Feral House, 2013.
- Finch, Peter. (1999). "Monstrous Inheritance: The Sexual Politics of Genre in Shelley's St.Irvyne." Keats-Shelley Journal: Keats, Shelley, Byron, Hunt, and Their Circles, 48, pp. 35–68.
- Frigo, Gabriele. "St. Irvyne; or, The Rosicrucian: Shelley davvero rosacrociano ad Oxford––1810-11?" Quadernede de Lingue e Letterature, 9 (1984): 33-35.
- Grande, James. "The Original Frankenstein, By Mary Shelley with Percy Shelley, ed. Charles E. Robinson: To what extent did Percy Bysshe Shelley work on 'Frankenstein'? A new analysis reveals all." The Independent, Sunday, 16 November 2008.
- Halliburton, David G. "Shelley's" Gothic" Novels." Keats-Shelley Journal 16 (1967): 39-49.
- Hogle, Jerrold E. "Shelley's Fiction: 'The Stream of Fate'." Keats-Shelley Journal: Keats, Shelley, Byron, Hunt, and Their Circles, 30 (1981), pp. 78–99.
- Hoeveler, Diane, "Percy Shelley’s Prose Fiction: Zastrozzi, St. Irvyne, The Assassins, The Coliseum" (2012). English Faculty Research and Publications. 211. Marquette University. https://epublications.marquette.edu/english_fac/211
- Jeaffreson, John Cordy. The Real Shelley: New Views of the Poet's Life. London: Hurst and Blackett, 1885.
- Jones. Frederick L. (1934). "'Alastor' Foreshadowed in St. Irvyne." Publications of the Modern Language Association, 49: pp. 969–971.
- Lauritsen, John. The Man Who Wrote Frankenstein. Dorchester, MA: Pagan Press, 2007. Percy Bysshe Shelley wrote the Preface to Frankenstein. The novel was already finished when he contributed at least 4,000-5,000 words in his handwriting. The handwriting approach is inadequate.
- Goulding, Christopher. (2002). "The real Doctor Frankenstein?" Journal of the Royal Society of Medicine, 95(5): 257-9. Christopher Goulding: "My thesis is that she [Mary Shelley] got what science she knew from Percy Shelley."
- "Scot's monster role played up". BBC News, 1 May 2002. "[Mary] Shelley: Knew little of science". Christopher Goulding: "[W]e might now give some credit to the time spent six years previously by her husband-to-be in the study of a retired Scots physician in Windsor."
- Goulding, Christopher. (November, 2006). "Shelley's Cosmological Sublime: William Herschel, James Lind, and 'The Multitudinous Orb'." Review of English Studies.
- King-Hele, Desmond. (1967). "Shelley and Dr. Lind." Keats—Shelley Memorial Bulletin, 18: 1 -6.
- King-Hele, Desmond. Shelley: His Thought and Work. Fairleigh Dickinson University Press, 1971.
- Mishra, Vijay. The Gothic Sublime. Albany, NY: State University of New York Press, 1994.
- Murphy, John V. The Dark Angel: Gothic Elements in Shelley’s Works. Lewisburg, PA: Bucknell University Press, 1975.
- Olcheski, Rachel. (2008)."The Influence of the Gothic on Shelley’s St. Irvyne and 'The Wandering Jew'."
- Peck, Walter E. "Interchapter II: The Sources and Significance of St. Irvyne; or, The Rosicrucian", pp. 90–100. In Shelley: His Life and Work. Boston and New York: Houghton, Mifflin, 1927.
- Rajan, Tilottama. "Promethean Narrative: Overdetermined Form in Shelley’s Gothic Fiction." Shelley: Poet and Legislator of the World. Bennett, Betty T. and Stuart Curran, editors. Baltimore, MD: Johns Hopkins University Press, 1996. pp. 240–52.
- Roberts, Marie. Gothic Immortals: The Fiction of the Brotherhood of the Rosy Cross. NY: Routledge, 1989.
- Stewart, Trevor. Enlightenment in the Alps: Shelley's Forgotten 'Rosicrucian' Novelette, St. Irvyne (1811) . Revised edition. Septentrione Books, 2011.
- Seed, David. "Shelley’s ‘Gothic’ in St. Irvyne and After." In Essays on Shelley, Miriam Allott, ed. Liverpool University Press, 1982, 39-70.
- Shelley, Percy Bysshe. Zastrozzi and St. Irvyne. (The World's Classics). Oxford: Oxford University Press, 1986.
- Whatley, John. (December, 1999). "Romantic and Enlightened Eyes in the Gothic Novels of Percy Bysshe Shelley." Gothic Studies, 1:2, pp. 201–21.
- Wheatley, Kim. ""Strange Forms": Percy Bysshe Shelley's Wandering Jew and St. Irvyne." Keats-Shelley Journal, vol. 65, 2016, p. 70-88. Project MUSE, https://muse.jhu.edu/article/673654.
- Tichelaar, Tyler R. The Gothic Wanderer: From Transgression to Redemption. Ann Arbor, MI: Modern History Press, 2012.
- Edmundson, Mark. Nightmare on Main Street: Angels, Sadomasochism, and the Culture of Gothic. Harvard University Press, 1999.
- Hedesan, Jo. "The ‘Good Vampire’ Archetype: A Brief Incursion into the Origins of Vampire Stories." Esoteric Coffeehouse, 15 December 2008.
- Summers, Montague. The Vampire, His Kith and Kin. Forgotten Books, 2008. Originally published in 1928.
- Birkhead, Edith. The Tale of Terror: A Study of the Gothic Romance. BiblioBazaar, 2006. pp. 104–127. Originally published in 1921 in London by Constable.
- Lovecraft, H. P. "Supernatural Horror in Literature." The Recluse, No. 1 (1927), pp. 23–59.
- Brewer, William Dean. The Shelley-Byron Conversation. Gainesville, FL: University Press of Florida, 1994.
- Zimmerman, Phyllis. Shelley's Fiction. Los Angeles, CA: Darami Press, 1998.
- Shelley, Mary, with Percy Shelley. The Original Frankenstein. Edited and with an Introduction by Charles E. Robinson. Oxford: The Bodleian Library, 2008. ISBN 978-1-85124-396-9
- Wade, Philip Tyree. "Shelley and the Miltonic Element in Mary Shelley's Frankenstein." Milton and the Romantics, 2 (December 1976), 23-25.
- Watson, Molly. "'Arising from the state of intellectual sickliness and lethargy': A Re-evaluation of Percy Shelley’s Gothic Fiction". Master's Thesis. 2021. University of Huddersfield. Southgate, Huddersfield, West Yorkshire, UK.
- Robinson, Charles E. "Percy Bysshe Shelley's Text(s) in Mary Wollstonecraft Shelley's Frankenstein", in The Neglected Shelley edited by Alan M. Weinberg and Timothy Webb.London and New York: Routledge, 2015, pp. 117–136.
- Rieger, James, edited, with variant readings, an Introduction, and, Notes by. Frankenstein; or the Modern Prometheus: The 1818 Text. Chicago and London: University of Chicago Press, 1982, Introduction, p. xviii, Note on the Text, xliv. Rieger concluded that Percy Bysshe Shelley's contributions are significant enough to regard him as a "minor collaborator": "His assistance at every point in the book's manufacture was so extensive that one hardly knows whether to regard him as editor or minor collaborator. ... Percy Bysshe Shelley worked on Frankenstein at every stage, from the earliest drafts through the printer's proofs, with Mary's final 'carte blanche to make what alterations you please.' .. We know that he was more than an editor. Should we grant him the status of minor collaborator?"
