= Wolfstein (book) =

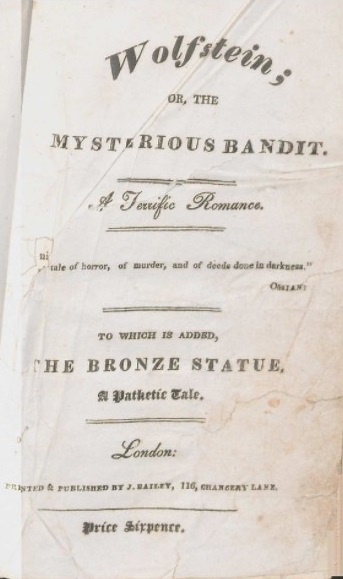
Wolfstein; or, The Mysterious Bandit, chapbook, title page, London, John Bailey, 1822.

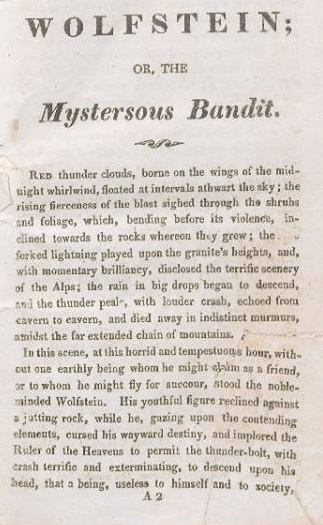
The first page.

Wolfstein; or, The Mysterious Bandit is an 1822 chapbook based on Percy Bysshe Shelley’s 1811 Gothic horror novel St. Irvyne; or, The Rosicrucian.

== Background ==
The 1811 novel St. Irvyne, or, The Rosicrucian was republished by John Joseph Stockdale in 1822 following Shelley’s death. Two chapbooks were also published based on the novel. No publication date appeared on the title page.

The first chapbook version was entitled Wolfstein; or, The Mysterious Bandit and was published and printed by John Bailey at 116, Chancery Lane in London in 1822. The chapbook was a condensed version of the novel in 20 pages. The total length was 28 pages including the second story. Chapbooks were meant for popular consumption, serving the same function as a paperback would. The chapbook sold for sixpence.

The story is described on the title page as "A Terrific Romance" with an epigraph by Ossian: "A tale of horror, of murder, and of deeds done in darkness." Added to Wolfstein was the story The Bronze Statue, A Pathetic Tale by another author, Anna Jane Vardill. "The Bronze Statue" had appeared for the first time in print as part of the "Annals of Public Justice" in The European Magazine of May, 1820, signed "V", i.e., Anna Jane Vardill.

The chapbook had a folding, engraved hand-colored frontispiece with the caption: "Deeper grew the gloom of the cavern, darkness seemed to press around them. Suddenly a flash of lightning burst through the abyss followed by thunder that seemed to convulse the universal fabric of nature; & borne on the sulpherous blasts, the prince of terror stood before him. --- page 19." This was a depiction of the final scene: a giant skeleton, a lightning bolt, the corpse of Serena, and the terrified Wolfstein. Under the engraving was the notation: "Pubd. by J. Bailey, 116 Chancery Lane, London."

== Plot summary ==
Like Frankenstein, Wolfstein is the name of a German town in southwestern Germany in the Rhine Palatinate district. Just as there is a Frankenstein Castle, there is also a Wolfstein Castle in Germany. "Frankenstein" in German means "Stone of the Franks", a Germanic tribe. "Wolfstein" means "Stone of the Wolf". German names, locations, and characters are a central theme of Gothic horror literature. The Goths were a Germanic tribe. Sir Horace Walpole developed the Gothic horror story with the publication of his novel The Castle of Otranto in 1764.

The chapbook follows the plot closely of the first section of the novel on the bandits but omits the second pastoral section featuring Frederic Nempere in Geneva.

The name of Cavigni, leader of the bandits, is changed to Stiletto. The name of Megalena is changed to Serena. The name of Ginotti, the Rosicrucian alchemist seeking to find the secret of eternal life, is changed to Barozzi.

The opening scene is of a raging thunderstorm. Wolfstein is a wanderer in the Swiss Alps who seeks cover from the storm. He is a distraught outcast who plans to commit suicide. A group of monks carrying a body for burial in a torch-light procession runs into him and saves his life.

Bandits attack them and take Wolfstein to an underground hideout. He meets Serena, whom the bandits have abducted after killing her father in an ambush.

A rivalry develops between Wolfstein and Stiletto, the leader of the bandits, over Serena. Wolfstein attempts to poison Stiletto after persuading him that he has no claims on Serena. Barozzi smashes the poisoned goblet to the floor. Pietro reads a story. Wolfstein manages to poison the leader of the bandits, Stiletto, in a second attempt. Suspicion falls on Barozzi. Wolfstein declines the invitation to be the new leader. Instead, Rodolph is the leader. His name was Ardolph in the novel.

Rodolph demands that everyone be searched. Wolfstein confesses. The bandits want to kill him but Barozzi intervenes. He persuades them to banish Wolfstein instead.

As Wolfstein is leaving, he sees Serena whom he blames for the murder. He stabs and kills her then flees.

He finds lodging in an inn. A man of "a gigantic stature and masked" seeks to see him. It is Barozzi. Wolfstein is shocked to meet him again.

Barozzi explains to him that he had saved him from certain death. In return, he wants to obtain a favor or promise from Wolfstein.

He asks Wolfstein to promise to protect him and to bury him after his death. Wolfstein agrees. Barozzi departs.

Wolfstein then has a dream. He is at the edge of a precipice when a gigantic figure approaches him to push him off the cliff. Barozzi dashed forward and "rescued him from the monster". The figure then grabbed Barozzi and threw him from the cliff. Barozzi fell with groans.

Barozzi returned to Wolfstein's apartment. He reveals to him that his identity and background will remain a mystery or secret. He has followed Wolfstein and has sought to influence his life. Under the title "Barozzi's Narrative" he recounts his career as an alchemist seeking to find the secrets to nature and immortality.

"From my earliest youth, (before it was quenched by complete satiation), curiosity inspired me with the desire of unveiling the latent mysteries of nature." He departed on a "precarious journey" from his home in Salamanca, Spain.

He faced self-destruction when engulfed by a tide but was saved when a nearby bell from a convent roused him.

He then fell asleep and dreamed that he was on a precipice where a phantom appeared who asked him: "Wilt thou come with me --- wilt thou be mine?" Wolfstein refused. Then he heard voices that were like "the dissolution of nature".

Frontispiece engraving. Barozzi and Wolfstein.

He was seized by a figure "more hideous that the imagination of man can pourtray." The figure then demanded that he relent. He was taken to the precipice and was to be thrown off of it. Wolfstein then exclaimed: "I am thine!" Then he awoke from his dream.

"I dived deeper into philosophical enquiries, and finally obtained the method by which man might exist forever." "A tale of too much horror" would follow if he explained it in detail.

"To one man alone may I communicate the secret of immortal life, then must I forego my claim to it." He gladly will relinquish the secret to Wolfstein. "To you I bequeath the secret" he tells Wolfstein but he must never divulge the secret of immortality to anyone. Wolfstein agrees.

Barozzi will reveal the secret at their next meeting at midnight at the ruined Abbey of St. Pietro, which is St. Irvyne in the novel.

Wolfstein goes to the abandoned abbey and enters the vaults. He stumbles over the lifeless body of Serena. "The laugh of anguish which had convulsed her expiring frame still played around her lips in a smile of horror and despair; her hair was loose and wild, seemingly gathered in knots by the convulsive grasp of dissolution." He dashes it to the floor. He rushed into the vaults and sat on a slab of stone waiting for the bell to ring.

When the bell struck midnight Barozzi appeared emaciated almost to a skeleton with hollow and sunken cheeks but still had a lofty demeanor.

Barozzi threw his mantle on the floor when he saw Wolstein. A lightning flash rushed through the vaults followed by thunder "that appeared to convulse the universal fabric of nature". Then borne on sulphurous blasts the "prince of terror" appeared.

Barozzi's body "mouldered to a gigantic skeleton". Two flames burned in his empty eye sockets. His body blackened, Wolfstein fell over him in spasms.

They were the victims of the "delusions of the passions" in attempting to seek eternal life. "Let endless life be sought from Him who alone can give an eternity of happiness."

Like in Frankenstein, seeking to obtain the secrets of nature leads to disaster.

== Sources ==
- Behrendt, Stephen C. Edited by, with Introduction, and notes. Zastrozzi and St. Irvyne. Peterborough, ON, Canada: Broadview Press, 2002. Behrendt gives a publication date between 1815 and 1818.
- Block, Andrew. The English Novel, 1740-1850: A Catalogue Including Prose Romances, Short Stories, and Translations of Foreign Fiction. London: Grafton, 1939, p. 266. Block gives a publication date of 1820.
- O’Neill, Michael, and Anthony Howe, edited by, with the assistance of Madeleine Callahan. The Oxford Handbook of Percy Bysshe Shelley. Oxford, UK: Oxford University Press, 2013, p. 199.
- Summers, Montague. A Gothic Bibliography. London: The Fortune Press, 1940, p. 561. A publication date of circa 1800 is given.
- Wolfstein. Project Gothic. University of Virginia Libraries. Retrieved 27 March 2026.
