= Anna Jane Vardill =

British poet (1781–1852)

Anna Vardill
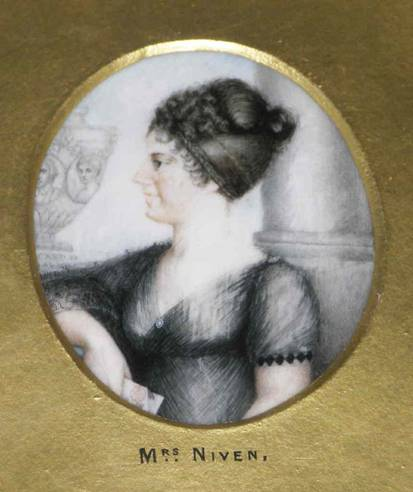
- Born: 19 November 1781; London, England
- Died: 4 June 1852 (aged 70); Skipton, England
- Other names: Anna Niven
- Occupation: Poet
- Spouse: James Niven
- Children: Agnes Niven

Anna Jane Vardill (later Anna Niven, pseudonym "V"; 19 November 1781 – 4 June 1852) was an English poet. She created a mystery when she published a sequel to one of Coleridge's poems before he had published his work. It was claimed that Vardill's poem was not hers but later evidence discovered after her death that this was her poem. There is a Vardill Society that is gathering her forty years of publications together.

== Life ==
Vardill was born on 19 November 1781, in London. Her father was the American loyalist and spy John Vardill. Her father was the rector of Skirbeck and Fishtoft in 1791 and she was brought up there, in Galloway and London. Her father was indulgent and spent many hours with her reading classical poetry together. Her mother, Agnes, was left an inheritance which came to her as the only legitimate heir. A nephew who had been made legitimate when his parents married challenged her claim and the case went to court. The Chancery court found in Agnes's favour but the nephew challenged the case.

Vardill was writing poetry for her school's production at age fifteen, with the music by Samuel Arnold.

She acknowledged her father's contribution in her first book in 1809. In a later tribute she wrote: "These and the subsequent lines are a feeble tribute to the memory of a most revered and lamented father" An inscription for a memorial tablet written by his daughter was published in the European Magazine, February 1811: if the commissioners denied his right to a Regis Professorship, his poet daughter repeatedly named him by that title, and made sure by essays, poems, and this tablet, that history would so remember him. Her father died in 1811.

In 1815, she created a mystery for later students when she published a sequel to Samuel Taylor Coleridge's poem "Christabel" in the European Magazine in August 1815. The mystery was how was this possible as Coleridge did not publish his original poem until almost a year later, in May 1816.

In 1822, she moved to Kirkcudbright to live at her new husband's estate in Scotland. She took Peter Niven's name but still continued to use the nom de plume of "V". In 1825, the poet Eleanor Anne Porden died of tuberculosis as her husband sailed out to find the North West Passage. Porden left her attic chest to Vardill and in 1830 she used this as the subject of a poem addressed to her five-year-old daughter. By 1834, Coleridge was dead and John Abraham Heraud published his view that Vardill's 1815 poem that was a sequel to Coleridge's poem was actually written by Coleridge.

Started to publish her work with for the European Magazine in 1809 and she would continue to publish there until 1852.

Later in life, widowed after her marriage to James Niven, she later became a close friend of novelist Mary Russell Mitford.

Vardill had homes in London and Skipton. She died in Skipton, on 4 June 1852, aged 70.

== Legacy ==
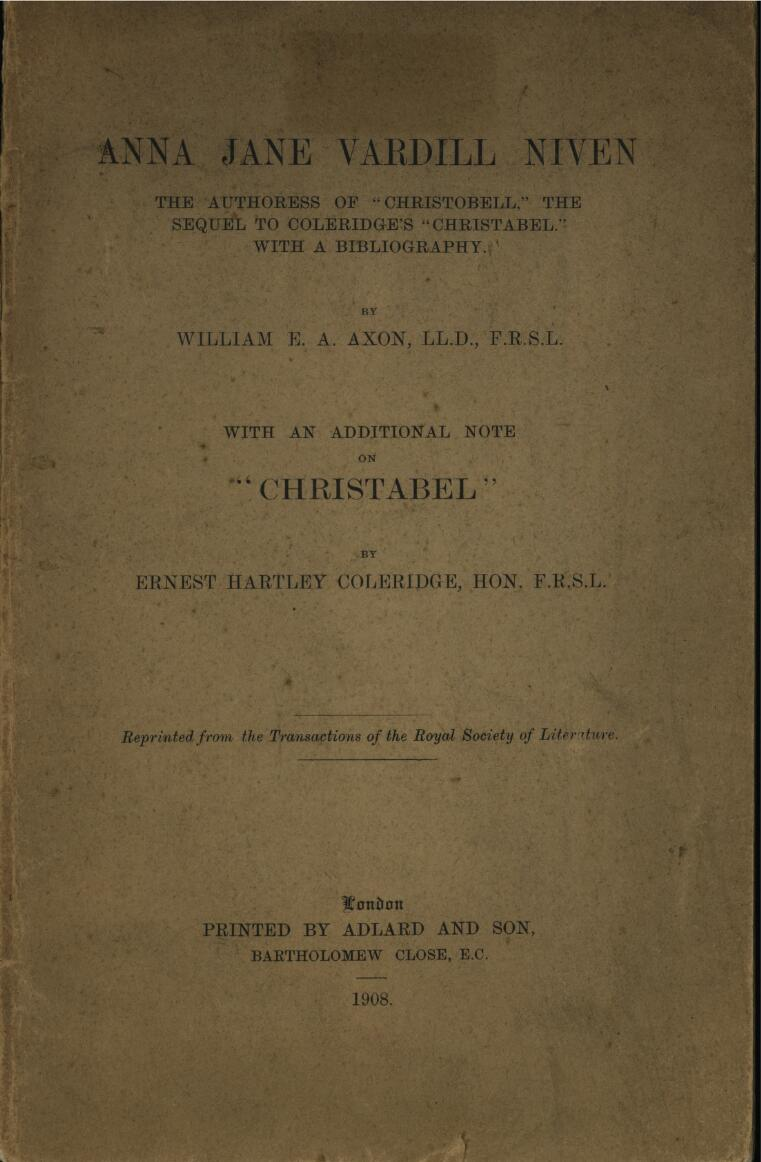
Anna Jane Vardill Niven frontispiece by William Axon

The journalist and antiquary William Axon published his study of Vardill's poem in 1908. Based on new evidence he was able to assure the Royal Society of Literature that he was sure that the poem had been written by Vardill. There is a Vardill Society who aim to gather her work into one resource.
