= History of Russian journalism =

The history of Russian journalism covers writing for newspapers, magazines, and electronic media since the 18th century. The main themes are low levels of literacy, censorship and government control, and the emphasis on politics and political propaganda in the media.

== 19th century ==
In the autocratic Russian Empire, freedom of the press was not allowed, and political journalism was strongly discouraged, although discussions of economic and social issues were allowed, particularly in the provinces, as the central government otherwise lacked sufficient sources of information. Until the 1860s, adventuresome Russians obtained their political news surreptitiously from foreign newspapers smuggled into the country. Writers such as Alexander Radishchev (1749–1802) who wanted to portray Russian conditions were sharply censored or punished. Official press releases were issued through several ministries, such as the war department's Russky Invalid 1813–1917.

The first privately owned daily newspaper was the Severnaya Pchela (Northern Bee), edited with government approval by Alexander Smirdin (1795–1857), a well-known publisher of literary books and school textbooks, as well as the literary magazines Biblioteka Dlya Chtenya and Syn otechestva. The Northern Bee was published in St. Petersburg 1825–1864 and reached a growing urban middle strata with literary tastes. Aristocratic writers such as Alexander Pushkin ridiculed its pandering to common tastes.

The first long-lasting provincial newspaper was Kazanskie izvestiia (Kazan News), which was edited by the faculty of Kazan University. Published in Kazan between 1811 and 1820, its audience consisted of merchants and other literate residents of the towns of the Volga region, as well as the many primary and secondary school teachers and other employees of the vast Kazan Educational District, which included the Volga and Ural regions as well as Siberia and was administered by the university. Its editors engaged in a debate over whether the public it reached should passively receive information provided by newly created ministries, such as the Ministry of Education, or actively create knowledge about the economic, social and ethnographic conditions of their region.

Andrey Krayevsky (1810–1889) was a Russian publisher and journalist, best known for his work as an editor-in-chief of Otechestvennye Zapiski (1839–1867), the influential literary journal. Another well-known publication that Krayevsky founded (in 1863) was the popular newspaper Golos (The Voice). Krayevsky was co-editor of Russky Invalid (1843-1852), Sankt-Peterburgskie Vedomosti (1852-1862, with the circulation rising up to 12,000).

The reduction in censorship was one of the many reforms of Alexander II in the 1860s. He cautiously allowed a limited freedom of the press; some 60 daily newspapers were allowed to publish. In 1863 Krayevsky founded the highly popular newspaper Golos, its circulation reaching the high point of 23,000. In 1866 he became one of the creators of the first ever Russian Telegraph Agency (RTA).

Aleksey Suvorin (1834–1912) was a leading editor, and book publisher, and a chain of bookstores. He was widely respected for the high quality of his editorial work, Which was tolerated by the government because of his conservative and nationalistic viewpoints.

The Russian Bulletin promoted liberalism, praised Alexander II's Great Reforms, and called for the rule of law and jury courts. By 1900 it called for a constitution and a parliament ("Duma"). It praised the peasant commune and the zemstvo. It wanted more equality and distrusted capitalism, industry and businessmen.

Much more popular than serious newspapers were the 429 short-lived satirical publications poking fun at the tsarist regime. They were targets of government censorship, as were the underground left-wing newspapers published by revolutionary parties.

While the government continued its censorship policy, the number of daily and weekly newspapers grew beyond its control. The solution was to slant the news before it was published. This was done by the St. Petersburg Telegraph Agency, which supported the tsars while increasing the public's political literacy. Between 1904 and 1917 it circulated factual information supplied by the government in order to create public opinion supporting the country's rapid industrialization as promoted by Sergei Witte, the Minister of Finance. Recognizing the power of the news agency for propaganda purposes, the Bolsheviks took over the telegraph agency in 1917.

The wide audience of newspapers is evident in the coverage and reception of the jubilee of the 80th birthday of Leo Tolstoy in 1908. Intensively reported and controversial, because of the commercialization of an author seen as spiritual, the jubilee became a moment for newspaper authors and readers of all social classes and estates to reflect on the significance of Tolstoy and literature for Russia.

=== Magazines ===
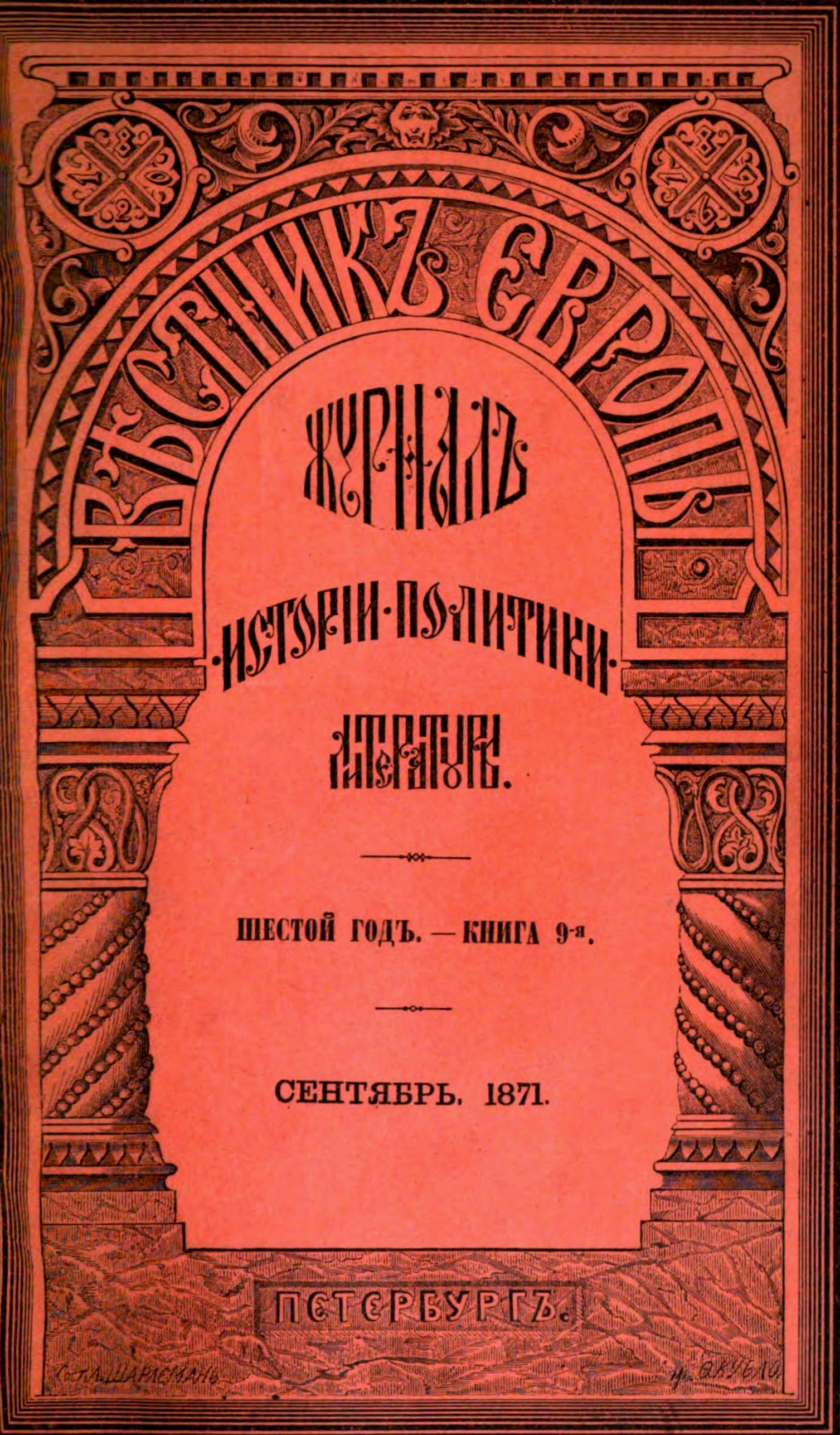
1871 cover of Vestnik Evropy

By the 1790s most subscribers to magazines were gentry, followed by clergymen and then merchants. Illiteracy among other groups exceeded 95%, so they included few subscribers.

By the 1860s there was a much larger potential readership. Most magazines featured light reading, with a few devoted to literature. Vestnik Evropy (Russian: Вестник Европы) (Messenger of Europe) was the major liberal magazine of late-nineteenth-century Russia. It was published from 1866 to 1918. Editor Mikhail Matveevich Stasiulevich (1826–1911) sought to explicate both liberalism and socialism with examinations of French socialist Pierre-Joseph Proudhon and English liberal John Stuart Mill. He avoided radicalism and looked for a middle way in which Russian liberalism would not clash with the working class or with socialism yet would remain distinct from European bourgeois liberalism.

Nationalism was an increasingly powerful draw. Mikhail Katkov (1818–87) was not a profound political theorist, but his journalistic abilities and talent for argument made him an important figure in the creation of a feeling of national identity and purpose. After the Crimean War (1856) and the Polish insurrection of 1863, Katkov abandoned his liberal Anglophile views and rejected the early reforms of Alexander II. Instead he promoted a strong Russian state supported by an enthusiastic Russian people with a unified national outlook. His ideas were based on Western ideas (as opposed to Slavophile ideas). His literary magazine Russkii Vestnik and newspaper Moskovskiye Vedomosti (Moscow News) were influential media for promoting his views.

Newspaper advertising became a major revenue source after 1895. Banks, railways, and major industries were active, and new advertising agencies emerged. The largest of these was Mettsel and Co. which at its peak controlled over half of the newspaper advertising market.

=== Minorities ===
Journalism was so far outside the traditional aristocratic realm, there were many openings for such diverse groups, including people with working-class backgrounds, women, and Jews.

Antisemitism was a common theme in the Russian press. A leading Russian newspaper, Novoe Vremia [New Times] started attacking the Jews in the late 1870s. Its virulence increased during the revolutionary years 1904–06, when it charged Jews with seeking to dominate Russia.

Julius Martov (1873–1923), a leading Menshevik, was the founder and editor of Russia's first Jewish journals and newspapers in Hebrew, Yiddish, and Russian; Ha-Melitz (The Advocate), Kol Mevasser (The Harbinger), Yidisher Folksblat (The Jewish People's Journal), and Vestnik russkikh evreev (Russian-Jewish Courier).

== Soviet era ==
The Bolsheviks under Lenin set up the daily newspaper Pravda in January 1912. Before it was suppressed by the government in 1914, it was a "singularly effective propaganda and educational instrument which enabled the Bolsheviks to gain control of the Petersburg labor movement and to build up a mass base for their organization." Under Lenin, the Bolsheviks (Communists) took total control of all the media, 1917–1991. The major national newspapers were Izvestia (the voice of the government), and especially Pravda (the voice of the party). Pravda acquired the first and best printing equipment for illustrations. The leading newspapers developed a specialized rhetorical vocabulary designed to enhance the totalitarian structure of society, with total truth emanating from the top, and all sorts of mischievous errors stemming from clumsy bureaucrats at lower levels, or from devious traitors and spies working on behalf of capitalism.

Ironclad uniformity of opinion was the norm during the Soviet era. The rare exceptions were indicators of high-level battles. The Soviet draft constitution of 1936 was an instance. Pravda and Trud (the paper for manual workers) praised the draft constitution. However Izvestiia was controlled by Nikolai Bukharin and it published negative letters and reports. Bukharin won out and the party line changed and started to attack "Trotskyite" oppositionists and traitors. Bukharin's success was short-lived; he was arrested in 1937, given a show trial and executed.

The Communist leadership was rooted in printed propaganda. Taking over a nation where 90% could not read, they made schools and literacy a high priority in order to optimize printed journalism and propaganda through newspapers and magazines, as well as posters that reached the illiterate older generations. Radio was not neglected—it was a major new technology, and was used for political speeches. Soviet authorities realized that the "ham" operator was highly individualistic and encouraged private initiative– too much so for the totalitarian regime. Criminal penalties were imposed but the working solution was to avoid broadcasting over the air. Instead radio programs were transmitted by copper wire, using a hub and spoke system, to loudspeakers in approved listening stations, such as the "Red" corner of a factory.

The Soviet style involved citizens listening to party leaders, using in-person speeches, radio talks or printed speeches. There was little role for the journalist to summarize or interpret the text; there was no commentary or background or discussion. No one questioned or challenged the leadership. There were no press conferences and little in the way of broadcast news.

Foreign correspondents were strictly prevented from any access beyond official spokesmen. The result was a rosy depiction of Soviet life in the Western media before Khrushchev exposed Stalin's horrors in the 1950s. The most famous exemplar was Walter Duranty of the New York Times.

== Since 1991 ==
Communism collapsed in 1991, leaving the media free of Communist control. The publishers and journalists were challenged by the immediate need to find and report accurate news, secure subscriptions and advertising revenue, and gain the confidence of readers. Since 2000 Vladimir Putin has been in power, and he has severely punished journalists who challenge his official point of view. His control has been both indirect and direct. In 2012, the national government owned all six national television networks, two radio networks, two of the 14 national newspapers, and three out of five of the 45,000 local newspapers and periodicals.

Robert W. Orttung and Christopher Walker report:

Reporters Without Borders, for instance, ranked Russia 148 in its 2013 list of 179 countries in terms of freedom of the press. It particularly criticized Russia for the crackdown on the political opposition and the failure of the authorities to vigorously pursue and bring to justice criminals who have murdered journalists. Freedom House ranks Russian media as “not free,” indicating that basic safeguards and guarantees for journalists and media enterprises are absent.

In 2015, according to Freedom House:

The nationalistic tone of the dominant Russian media continued to drown out independent and critical journalism in 2015, stressing patriotic themes associated with Russia’s 2014 military incursions into Ukraine and the launch of air strikes in Syria....Progovernment media outlets also sought to mobilize public support and suppress any dissent in the face of an economic downturn linked to falling oil prices and Ukraine-related sanctions. Deterrents to independent reporting and commentary included draconian laws and extralegal intimidation.

Most analysts focus on Putin, who has served continuously since 1999 as prime minister or president. Maria Lipman says, "The crackdown that followed Putin's return to the Kremlin in 2012 extended to the liberal media, which had until then been allowed to operate fairly independently." Marian K. Leighton says, "Having muzzled Russia's print and broadcast media, Putin focused his energies on the Internet."

As of 2023, Russia ranked 164 out of 180 countries in the Press Freedom Index compiled by Reporters Without Borders.
