= Yelena Hahn =

Russian writer (1814–1842)

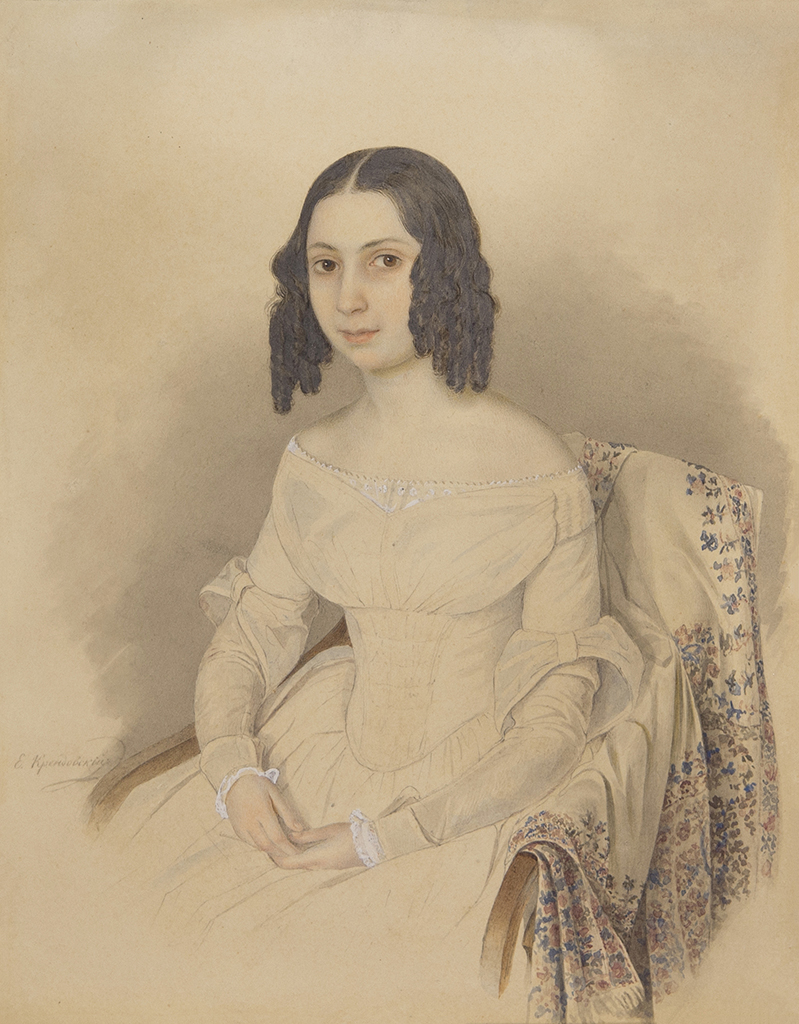
Portrait by E. F. Krendovsky

Yelena Andreyevna Hahn von Rottenstern (Note: Sometimes transliterated as Elena Gan; Russian: Елена Андреевна Ган; Ukrainian: Олена Андріївна Ган.) (née Fadeyeva; 23 January [O.S. 11 January] 1814 – 6 July [O.S. 24 June] 1842) was a Russian writer known for her contributions to the literary journals Biblioteka Dlya Chteniya and Otechestvennye Zapiski. Hahn's work has been interpreted by several scholars in differing ways. Hahn is also the mother of Helena Blavatsky, the founder of Theosophy.

== Early life and family ==
Yelena Andreyevna Fadeyeva was born on 23 January [O.S. 11 January] 1814 to a noble family in Rzhishchev (now Rzhyshchiv, Ukraine). Her parents were Andrei Fadeyev, privy councilor and governor of Saratov, and Yelena Pavlovna Dolgorukaya, member of the Dolgorukov princely family. Her mother was also a noted writer who had many publications under her belt in botany. Also among her relatives were the poet Evdokiya Rostopchina and Yekaterina Sushkova, a friend of Mikhail Lermontov, with whom Yelena was also personally acquainted. She was also related to the famous poets Ivan Dolgorukov and Fyodor Tyutchev.

At the age of sixteen, she married Captain Peter Hahn von Rottenstern (1798–1873), a military man almost twice her age, descended from the von Hahn family, which belonged to an old Baltic-German nobility. She and her husband were often living in provincial towns. Her marriage has been seen by commentators as ‘unsatisfactory’ as her husband was ‘unimaginative’. They had three children, including future writers Helena Blavatsky (born 1831) and Vera Zhelikhovskaya (born 1835). She died of tuberculosis on 6 June 1842, aged 28, in Odessa.

== Literary activity ==
In 1835, she made a partial translation of the Bulwer-Lytton novel Godolphin, which was published in Biblioteka Dlya Chteniya, then edited by her literary mentor Osip Senkovsky. In 1837 her first novel, The Ideal, was serialized under the pseudonym Zeneida R-va. While traveling in the Caucasus in 1837 she met exiled Decembrists, an experience that informed a number of subsequent works, including Memoirs of Zheleznovodsk and Utballa and Jellaleddin, published in 1838. In the following three years she published further stories: Medallion, Court of Light, Theophania Abbiaggio. In 1842 she authored Idle Gift, published in Otechestvennye Zapiski. Society’s Judgement was also published in 1842. Her collected works were published in St. Petersburg in 1843, and republished in 1905.

Due to the themes of societal misjudgement and the military life present in some of her works, they have been compared to her own life and considered semi-autobiographical; however, commentators argue that the outcasts represented in her work should not be seen as a reflection of her own life and status. Though, in her time Hahn was also seen as the ideal figure of the provincial heroine as she represented the tropes present in literature at the time that does not necessarily mean she was reflecting her own life within her work.

Her works also dealt with marriages for her heroines that were not suitable matches for them. It may be incorrect to assume that her goal was a feminist denunciation of women’s positions in the patriarchal society. Additionally, while her heroines do not seek specifically traditionally feminine roles, they also aren’t searching to have traditionally masculine roles in society. Her concern actually seems to be the building of an imaginative world for women. Many of her heroines felt that creating and writing were important to their lives as well.

Hahn's literary merits did not go unnoticed by her contemporaries. Many prominent literary figures responded to her works. Ivan Turgenev wrote, "In this woman there was ... both a warm Russian heart and the experience of female life, as well as the passion of conviction." Vissarion Belinsky wrote, "There are writers who live a separate life from their creations, and there are writers whose personality is closely related to their works. Reading the first, you enjoy the divine art without thinking about the artist; reading the second, you enjoy the contemplation of a beautiful human being, think about her, love her, and want to know the details of her life. Our gifted Zeneida R-va (Yelena Hahn) belongs to this second category."

Hahn has been compared to George Sand due to her criticism of male society and her depiction of the position which women occupy in the world and in society.

== Sources ==
- "Ган, Елена Андреевна" . Brockhaus and Efron Encyclopedic Dictionary (in Russian). 1906.
- Andrew, Joe (2 December 2013). "Elena Andreevna Gan". In Cornwell, Neil (ed.). Reference Guide to Russian Literature. Routledge. pp. 313–314. ISBN 978-1-134-26070-6.
