= Elizaveta Akhmatova =

Russian writer, publisher and translator

- Born: 2 December 1820; Nachalovo, Astrakhan Governorate, Russian Empire
- Died: 12 April 1904 (aged 83); Saint Petersburg
- Writing career
- Pen name: Leila
- Subjects: Stories and translation

Elizaveta Nikolayevna Akhmatova writing as Leila (Russian: Елизавета Николаевна Ахматова; 2 December 1820 – 12 April 1904) was a Russian writer, publisher and translator who published translations of English and French writers into Russian.

== Life ==
Akhmatova was born in Nachalovo, Astrakhan Governorate in 1820 where she showed an early aptitude for languages. She would read books written in French and translate them as she read aloud to her mother in Russian. She received a good education despite her father dying when she was five.

As a writer she was "adopted" by the Polish-Russian journalist Osip Senkovsky who replied favourably to an unpublished translation that she sent him in 1842. Akhmatova saw him as a father figure who guided her writing career. She moved to St Petersburg in 1848 although she had visited there three years earlier. She translated and wrote for Senkovsky's journal Library for Reading. She wrote for other editors including Senkovsky's successor Albert Starchevsky.

In 1856 she created her own publication which was titled Collected Foreign Novels, Novellas and Stories Translated into Russian. This magazine would flourish for twenty years although one source says thirty. There were 344 different issues and it included the work of Charles Dickens, Wilkie Collins, George Sand, Émile Zola and Anthony Trollope. She also created publications for younger readers but these had shorter lives.

She took some criticism that was intended for Senkovsky. Some writers objected to how their work had been edited and Akhmatova's own stories were frequently changed or condensed before publication. Akhmatova's stories are noted for having strong female leads who direct male characters through the narrative.

Akhmatova died in Saint Petersburg.
