= Chodzko =

Chodzko or Chodźko is a surname. Notable people with the surname include:

- Adam Chodzko (born 1965), British multimedia artist
- Aleksander Chodźko (1804–1891), Polish poet, Slavist, and Iranologist
- Leonard Chodźko (1800–1871), Polish historian, geographer, cartographer, and publisher
- Lysette Anne Chodzko (born 26 September 1963), known professionally as Lysette Anthony, English actress and model
- Witold Chodźko (1875–1954), Polish social activist, public health pioneer, neurologist and psychiatrist
