= Jan Heidatel =

Russian engineer

Jan Rotwill Heidatel (1801 – 21 March 1871, Kraków) was a Russian engineer, general-mayor, Candidate of Philosophy, and commander of Liepāja port.

Heidatel was born to a French father and Polish mother. While studying at Vilnius University he joined the secret Filaret Association. From 1824 he served in the Corpus of Water Communications in the Ministry of Transport of the Russian Empire. In February 1825 he was sent as an officer to Arkhangelsk and was later promoted to general. He was a head of the region of communication tracts in Kaunas. In 1830 he took part in the November Uprising against Tsarist rule. After 1850 he worked in Liepāja.

Heidatel was married and had two children. He died in Kraków and his burial service was held in St. Anna Roman Catholic church. He was buried in the Powązki Cemetery.
