= Filaret Association =

Lithuanian secret society (1820–1823)

- Founded: 1820; 206 years ago Vilnius University
- Type: Secret
- Affiliation: Independent
- Status: Defunct
- Defunct date: 1823
- Scope: Local
- Chapters: 1
- Headquarters: Vilnius; Lithuania

The Filaret Association (also translated as filaret(e)s, philaret(e)s; Lithuanian: Filaretai, Polish: Zgromadzenie Filaretów, Towarzystwo Przyjaciół Pożytecznej Zabawy, filareci; from the Greek philáretos, "lovers of virtue") was a secret student organization created in 1820 at Vilnius University. It was disbanded in 1823.

== History ==
Filaret Association was a secret student organization created in 1820 by Tomasz Zan within the Philomates following the dissolution, under pressure from Vilnius University authorities, of the Radiant Association. The Filaretes continued the latter's tradition, with the stated aims of supporting fellow students through good advice, and more unofficially, promoting Polish culture and patriotism. They had about 176 members in 1822. The Association was disbanded in 1823 following the arrests of the Philomathes.

== Notable members ==
- Aleksander Chodźko
- Jan Czeczot
- Ignacy Domeyko
- Franciszek Malewski
- Adam Mickiewicz
- Antoni Edward Odyniec
- Tomasz Zan
