= Philomaths =

Polish student organization

- Founded: 1 October 1817; 208 years ago Imperial University of Vilnius
- Type: Secret
- Affiliation: Independent
- Status: Defunct
- Defunct date: 1823
- Scope: Local
- Chapters: 1
- Headquarters: Vilna, Vilna Governorate; Russian Empire (now Lithuania)

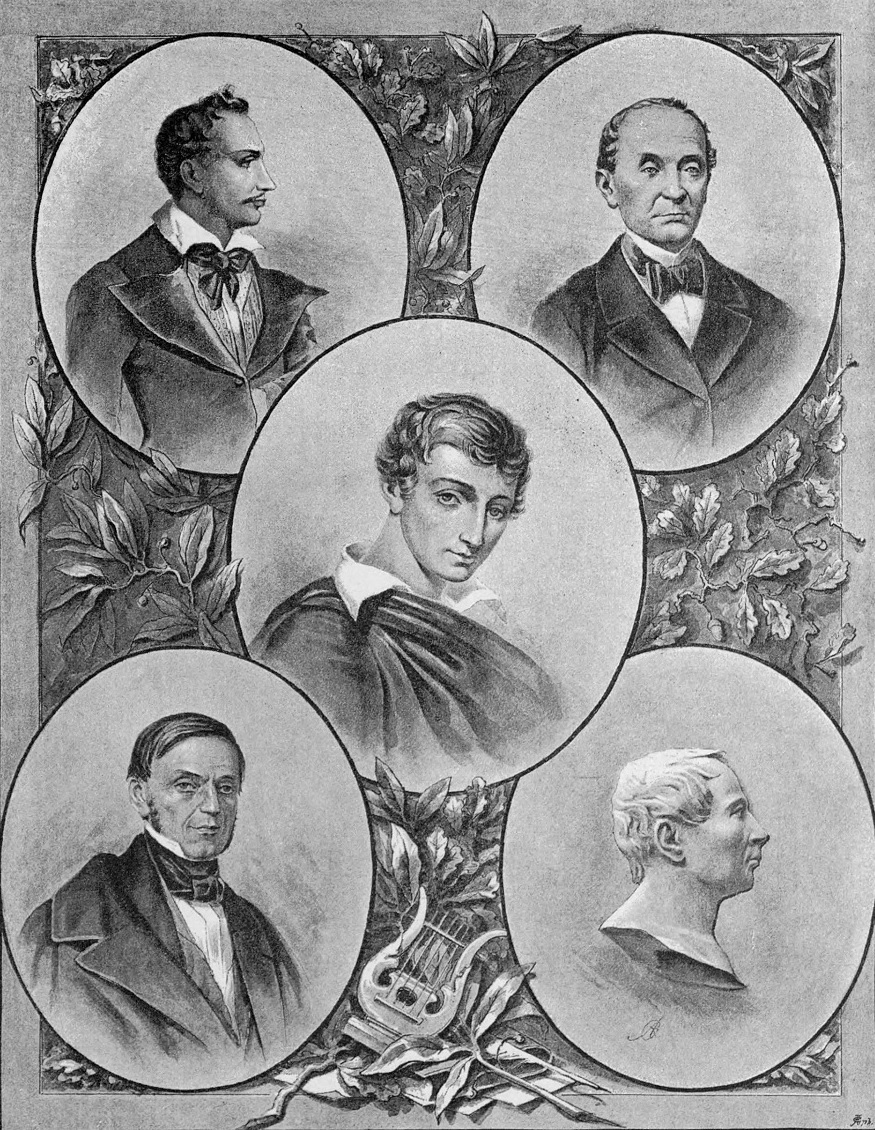
Philomaths and Philarets: Tomasz Zan, Ignacy Domejko, Adam Mickiewicz, Antoni Edward Odyniec, Jan Czeczot. Picture produced in 1899.

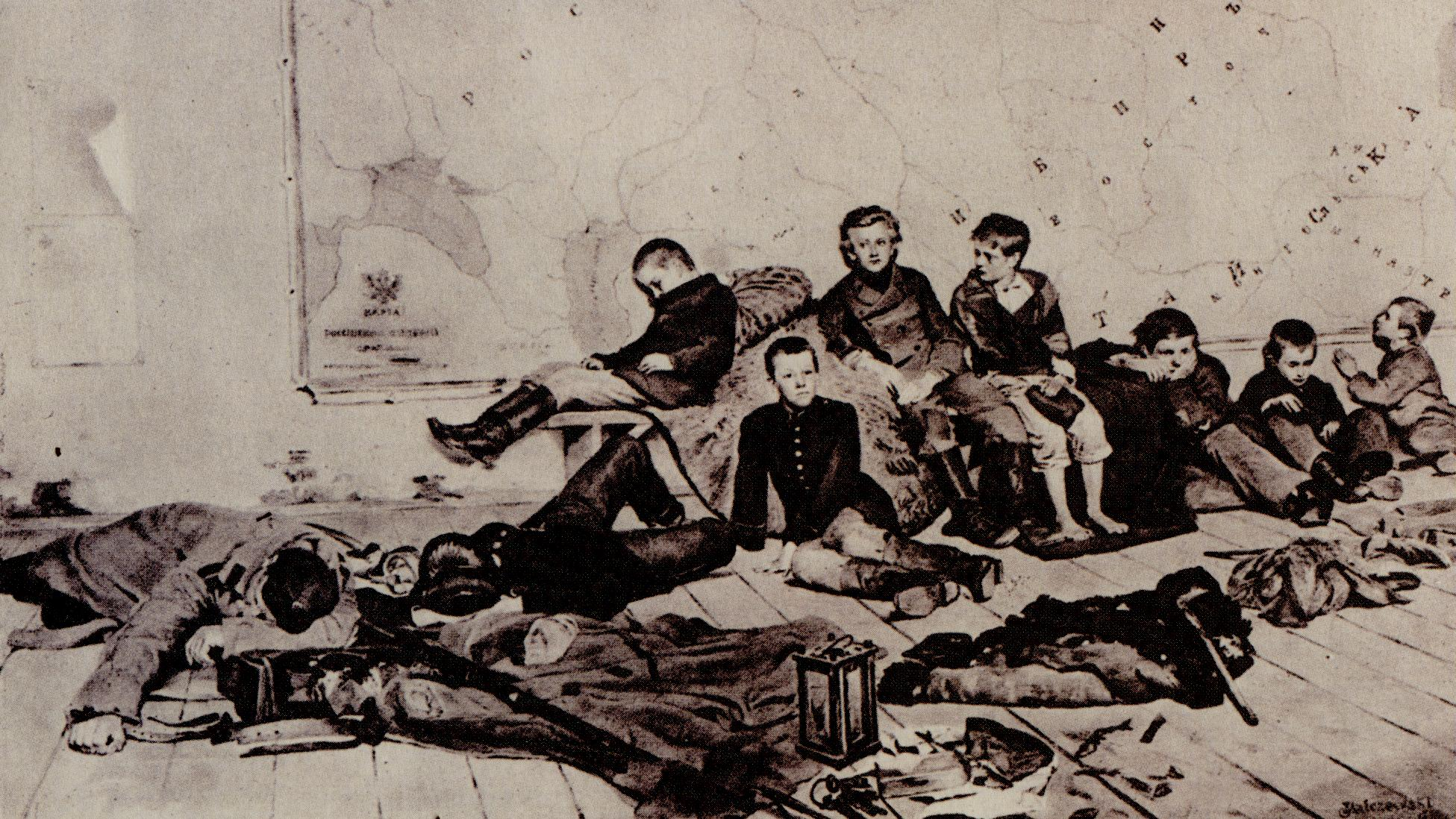
Students' Exile: Polish students are exiled to Siberia. Painting by Jacek Malczewski, 1891.

The Philomaths, or Philomath Society (Polish: Filomaci or Towarzystwo Filomatów, Lithuanian: Filomatai or Filomatų draugija; from the Greek φιλομαθεῖς "lovers of knowledge"), was a secret student organization that existed from 1817 to 1823 at the Imperial University of Vilnius.

== History ==
The society was created on 1 October 1817 in Vilnius, Vilna Governorate, Russian Empire, which had acquired those territories in the Partitions of Poland-Lithuania in 1794. The society was composed of students and alumni of the Imperial University of Vilnius.

Notable members included Józef Jeżowski (co-founder and president), Jan Czeczot (co-founder), Józef Kowalewski (co-founder), Onufry Pietraszkiewicz (co-founder), Tomasz Zan (co-founder), Adam Mickiewicz (co-founder), Antoni Edward Odyniec, Ignacy Domejko, Teodor Łoziński, Franciszek Malewski, Jan Sobolewski, Aleksander Chodźko, Michał Kulesza. Most of them were students, but some members and supporters included faculty and former alumni.

Its structure was a cross between freemason organization and a learned society. It was divided into two chapters – scientific-mathematic and literary. The members of the latter discussed literary works, and the organization aims were self-educational and didactic; however, around 1819-1820, the members became split on whether the organizations should concentrate on self-education (Jeżowski) or take a more active role in restoring Poland's independence (Mickiewicz), eventually the second faction gained dominance and new social and political goals emerged.

The discussions increasingly turned toward romanticist ideas that were banned by the Russian Empire for their pro-independence currents; history of the Polish–Lithuanian Commonwealth was studied, pro-independence works written and circulated. The organizations inspired the creation of many similar youth organizations across the former Grand Duchy of Lithuania, and it established ties with similar clandestine pro-Polish organizations in Congress Poland and the rest of partitioned lands, such as the Patriotic Society (Towarzystwo Patriotyczne) of Walerian Łukasiński, and even Russian organizations such as the Decembrists.

Two closely related groups were formed:

- The Radiant Association (Towarzystwo Promienistych, from "promieniści," the "Radiant Ones"), (1820) a legal organization created by Tomasz Zan, and disbanded under pressure from University authorities, in May 1820;
- The Filaret Association (Zgromadzenie Filaretów, Filaretai, Towarzystwo Przyjaciół Pożytecznej Zabawy, filareci, from the Greek "philáretos," "Lovers of Virtue), (1834) a secret organization created by Zan within the Philomaths after the dissolution of the Radiants. It continued the traditions of the Radiants, but with a much clearer pro-independence goal, and was dedicated to the study of Polish and Lithuania patriotic literature. It was disbanded in 1823 after the arrests of the Philomaths.

Ignacy Domeyko described the spirit prevailing in the Philomaths and the Filaret Association as: "purely national, patriotic, Polish – but free from plots and conspiracies, free of demagogic rants". According to Theodore R. Weeks, both organizations advocated a love for Polish culture and patriotism, but shied away from developing any concrete political program and their members generally declared loyalty to the Russian ruler.

In 1822 the organizations went through some name changes. In 1823 the organization was discovered by Russian authorities led by Nikolay Nikolayevich Novosiltsev. After a trial that lasted several months, in 1824, 108 people were convicted of membership in this or related organizations; 20 members of the Philomaths or related organizations were sentenced to imprisonment or katorga and exiled to Siberia; over a dozen faculty members were dismissed (including historian Joachim Lelewel).

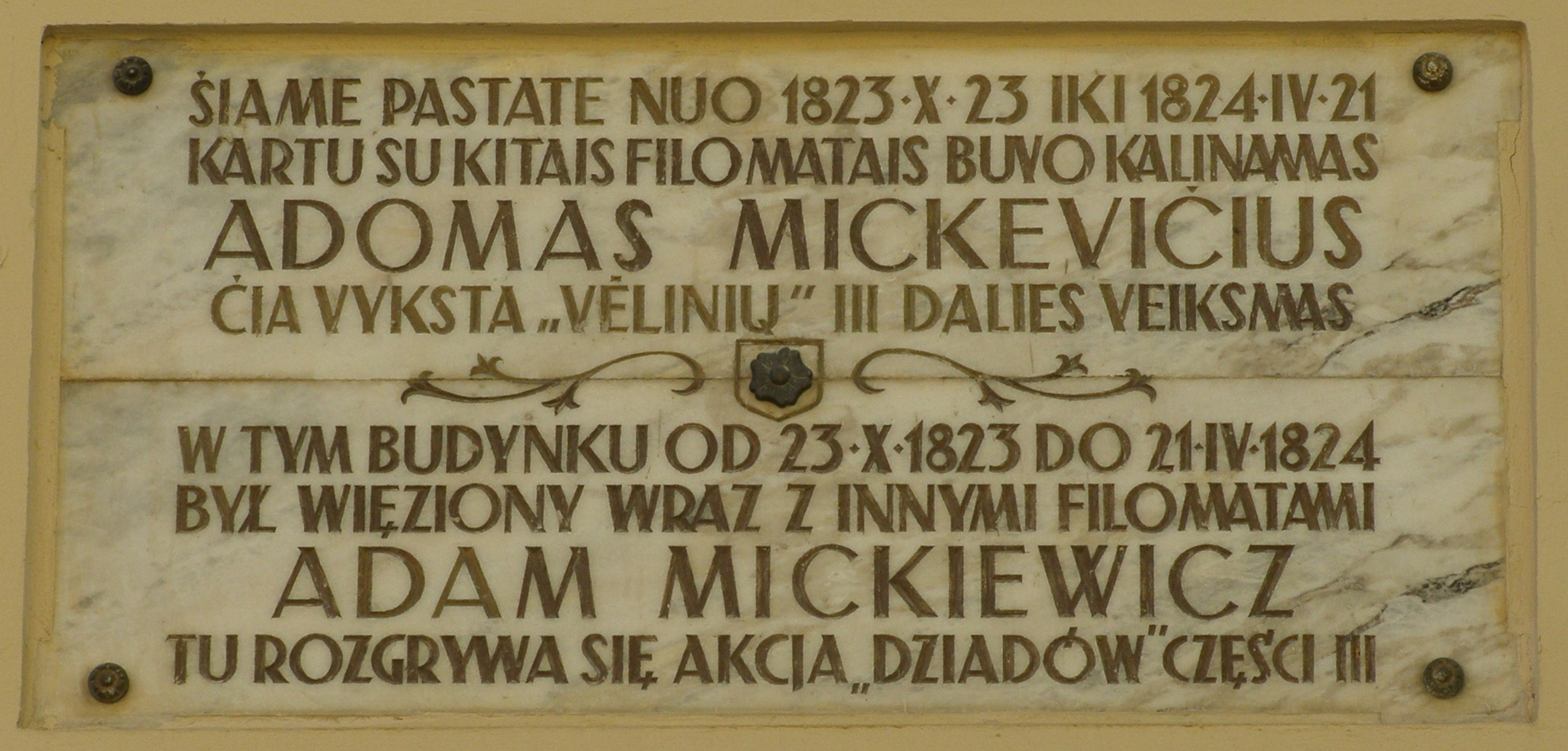
Plaque on Vilnius building where Adam Mickiewicz, Ignacy Domeyko and other Philomaths were imprisoned during their trials, October 23, 1823 – April 21, 1824. "Scene of Forefathers' Eve, part III."

Adam Mickiewicz, one of the Three Polish Bards, convicted of being a Philomath member and exiled into Russia, later described his experiences in that period in the third part of a major work, Dziady (Forefathers' Eve).
