= Leonard Chodźko =

Polish scholar and activist

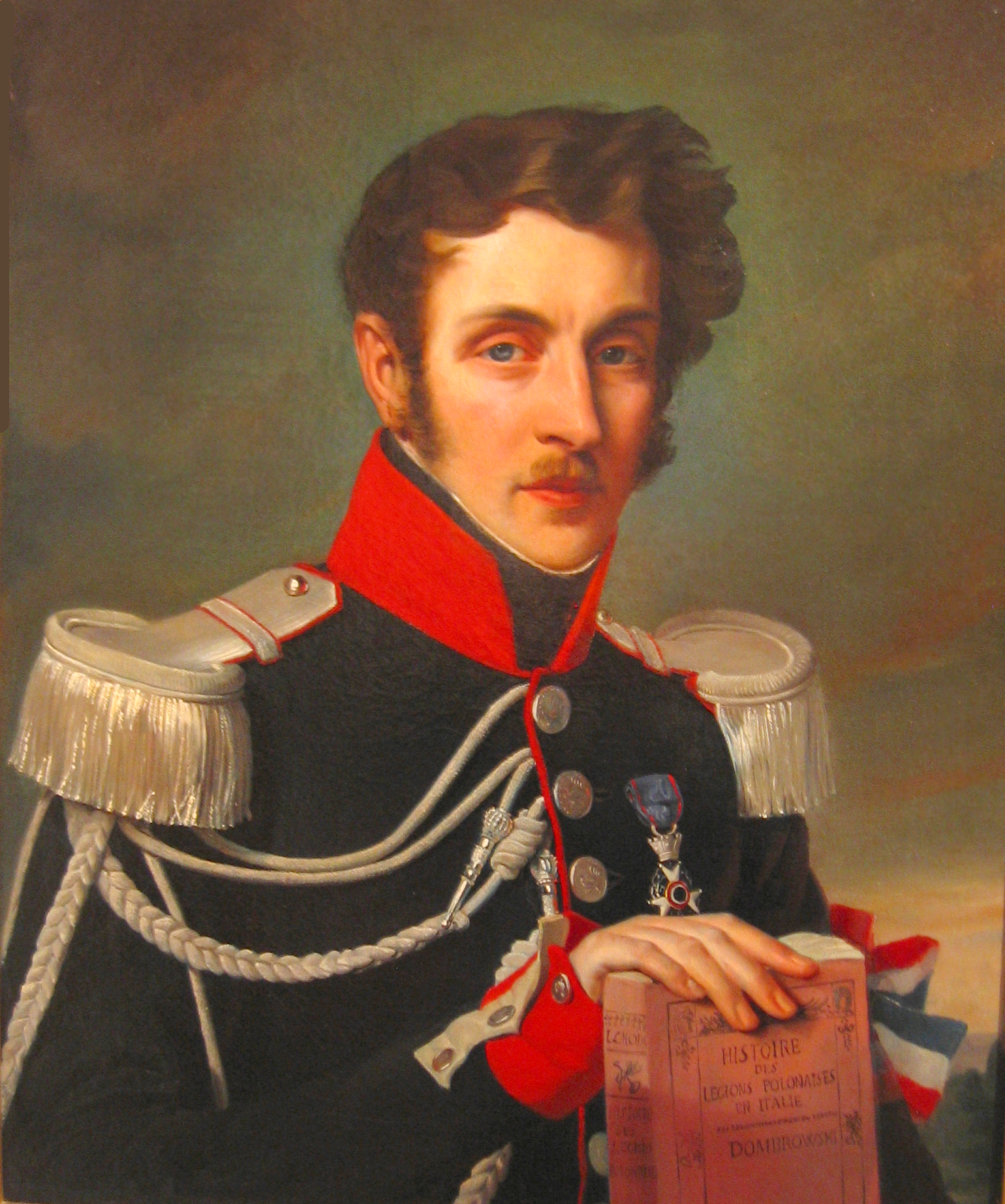
- Coat of arms: Kościesza
- Born: 6 November 1800; Oborek
- Died: 12 March 1871 (aged 70); Poitiers, France
- Buried: Poitiers, France
- Family: Chodźko
- Father: Ludwik Chodźko
- Mother: Waleria née Dederko

Leonard Borejko Chodźko (1800–1871) was a Polish historian, geographer, cartographer, publisher, archivist, and activist of Poland's post-November-1830-Uprising Great Emigration.

== Life ==
He was born on November 6, 1800, in Oborek, as the son of the nobleman Ludwik Chodźko and Waleria née Dederko. Chodźko was educated at the University of Vilnius, where he was a member of the Philomaths, a secret organization established in 1816 by Vilnius University students including Adam Mickiewicz, Tomasz Zan and Józef Jeżowski.

From 1826 he lived in Paris. During France's July 1830 Revolution, he served as aide-de-camp to General La Fayette.

Around 1810, he married Olimpia Maleszewska, the daughter of the Polish economist Piotr Maleszewski, who in turn was the natural son of Michał Jerzy Poniatowski, the Primate of Poland and the brother of King Stanisław August Poniatowski. Olimpia's mother was Jeanne Venture de Paradis, known as "the Egyptian," the daughter of the French orientalist Jean Michel de Venture de Paradis. Leonard and Olimpia had no offspring.

== Works ==
- Histoire des légions polonaises en Italie (1829)
- Histoire populaire de la Pologne (1863)
- Les Polonais en Italie (1829)
- Tableau de la Pologne ancienne et moderne sous le rapport géographique, statistique, géologique etc. (1830)
- Histoire politique de la Lituanie, depuis la réunion de la Pologne en 1386, jusqu’à son insurrection en 1831 (1831)
- Biographie du géneral Kościuszko (1837)
- Massacres de Galicie et Cracovie confisquée par l'Autriche en 1846 (1861)
- Un évêque polonais, le métropolitain Kazimir Gaspard Colonna Cieciszewski et son temps (1745-1831) (1866)
- Recueil des traités, conventions, actes diplomatiques etc. relatifs à la Pologne, de 1762 á 1862.
- Notice biographique sur Joachim Lelewel; Paris, 1834
- Le Congrès de Vienne et les traités de 1815, précédés et suivis des actes diplomatiques qui s'y rattachent; 1863 / 1864; éditeur : Amyot; Paris; 4 vol.

== See also ==
- Polish Museum, Rapperswil
