= Albert Starchevsky =

Russian historian, journalist, editor, philologist, lexicographer and encyclopedist

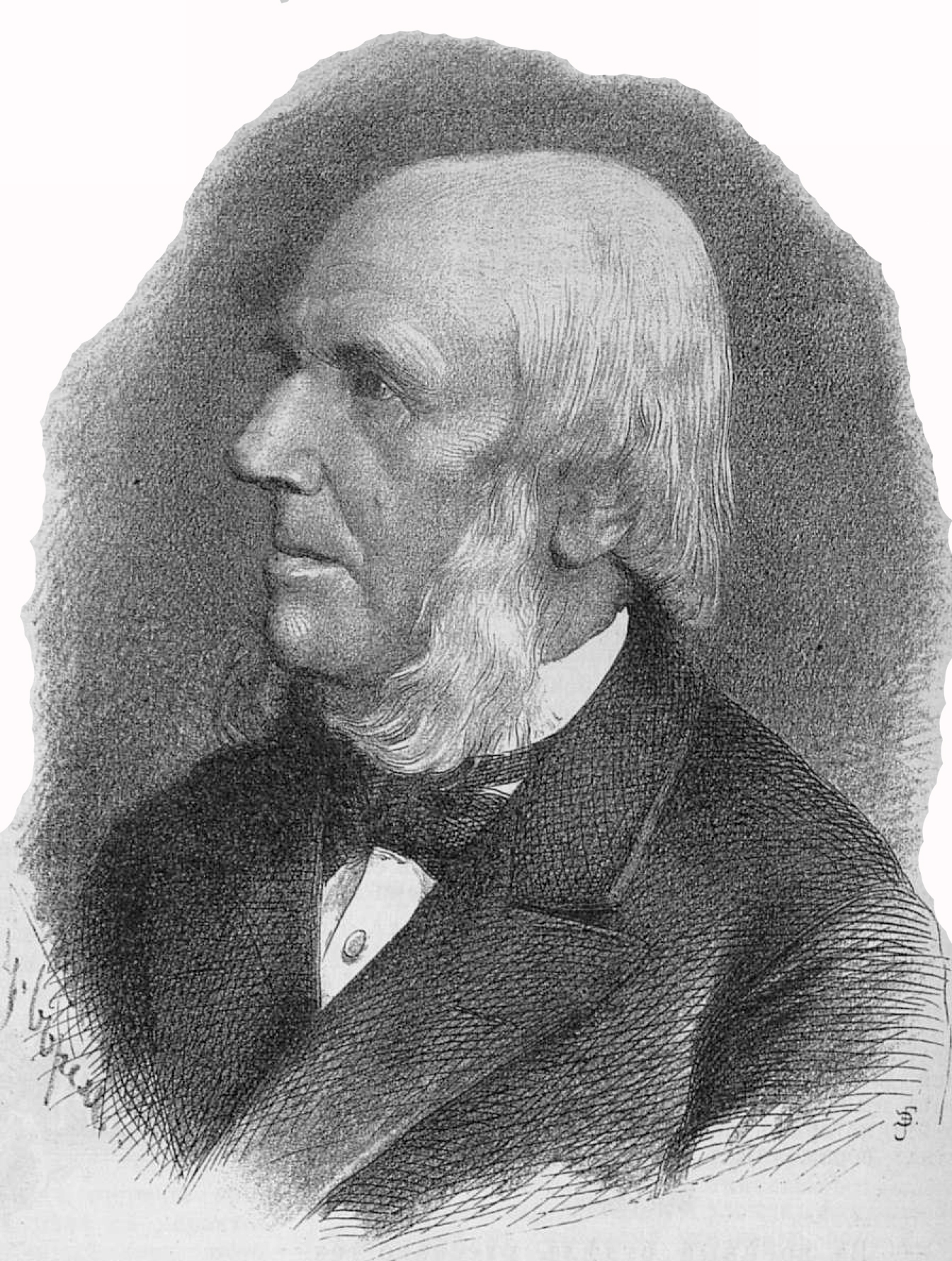
- Born: Adalbert-Wojciech Starczewski; April 28, 1818; Kiev Governorate, Russian Empire
- Died: October 7, 1901 (aged 83); Saint Petersburg, Imperial Russia
- Occupation: journalist • literary historian• philologist • lexicographer • encyclopedist

Albert Vikentyevich Starchevsky (Russian: Альбе́рт Вике́нтьевич Старче́вский, born Adalbert-Voytekh Starchevsky, Polish: Adalbert-Wojciech Starczewski, 28 April 1818, Kiev Governorate, Imperial Russia, — 7 October 1901, Saint Petersburg, Imperial Russia) was a Russian literary historian, journalist, editor, philologist, lexicographer and encyclopedist of Polish descent.

Born in the Ivki village, Kiev Governorate, into a Polish family, Starchevsky studied law first at Kiev University, then at Saint Petersburg University. He published his first major work (Foreign Writers' Accounts of Russia, 1841, followed by the part two of it, Historiae Rathenicae Scriptores exteri saeculi XVI, 1842) while still a student.

An authority on East European and Asian languages, he authored numerous books on Slavic philology and ethnography, compiled and edited several important Eastern languages dictionaries, including the Ancient Slavic Language dictionary (1899), as well as the original edition of the Russian Encyclopedic Dictionary, in 1848–1853. Starchevsky edited Biblioteka Dlya Chtenya (with Osip Senkovsky, in the 1850s), Syn Otechestva (from 1856, for some twenty years, with breaks), then (in 1879–1885) Sovremennost (Our Times), Ulei (Beehive), Ekho (Echo) and Rodina (Native Land) newspapers.
