= Peter Hahn =

Russian nobleman (1799–1873)

Peter Hahn von Rottenstern (1799–1873) was a member of the Baltic German nobility, which also belonged to Russian nobility, remembered in the United States mainly as the father of Helena Blavatsky.

== Early life and marriage ==
Born as the son of the Baltic-German Lieutenant-General Axel Heinrich Hahn von Rottenstern (d. 1815) and his wife, Christine Elizabeth von Pröbsting (d. 1799), daughter of Magnus Wilhelm von Pröbsting (1731–1788). He was the father of Helena Petrovna Blavatsky.

A captain of horse artillery, known as Peter von Hahn, whose family came originally from the petty nobility of Mecklenburg, married, in 1830, the 16-year-old Helena Fadeeva. She was the daughter of Princess Helena Dolgorukova (1789–1860) and Andrei Mikhailovich Fadeev (1789–1867), Privy Councillor of the Caucasus, and half his age. Vera, a younger sister of Helene Fadeev, would marry Julius Witte and become the parents to Count Sergei Yulievich Witte.

== Polish Campaign and birth of Helena ==
Soon after the wedding, the young captain received orders to join his regiment for service in the notably ruthless campaign to put down the Polish insurrection of 1831. The girl-wife returned to her parents in Ekaterinoslav in the heart of Ukraine, and it was there that Helena was born on the night of August 12, 1831 (July 31, on the Russian Julian calendar).

== Military life and death of wife ==
At the close of the Polish campaign, Madame Hahn and "Lolo" (her pet name for her daughter Helena), rejoined the Captain at the station in southern Russia where he was leading raids against the mountain tribes of the Caucasus. Captain Hahn had been educated as a member of the Imperial Cadet Corps, limited to the sons of the nobility. On his wife's death, at the age of 28, the Captain realized that army camps were most unsuitable for little girls. And the two children were escorted back to their grandparents' home.

== Marriage and escape of Helena ==
Colonel Hahn retired sometime before 1848 and was living near Saint Petersburg when his daughter married Nikifor Blavatsky. This marriage lasted only three months, and Helena ran away, abandoning her husband. Her grandfather promptly shipped her off to her father, but she escaped with a boat captain, "leaving her father fuming on the docks of Odessa". She was not to contact her family for the next ten years. Her future discussions of these years are extremely confused and contradictory and even today have not been satisfactorily explained or researched.

== Later life ==
Shortly afterward, Col Hahn married again to Adelheid von Lang (1798–1873), daughter of Alexander von Lang. They had a daughter Elizabeth (1850–1908), later married Kirill Ivanovich Beliy (d. 1908). Adelheid died a few years later. Col Hahn was living in 1858 in Saint Petersburg, where Helena's sister Vera was also living, when Helena again showed up. Her sister Vera lived in the small village of Rugodevo, which she had inherited from her late husband. According to reports, Col Hahn was at first aloof from Helena's alleged psychic powers, but later come to believe in them, from certain demonstrations. He died and is buried at Stavropol.

== Wives and children ==
With Helene Fadeyeva

- Helena afterwards Blavatsky, b 1831–1891
- Sasha b 1832 d 1833
- Vera afterwards Vera Zhelihovsky(1835–96)
- Leonid b 1840

With Adelheid von Lang

- Liza b 1849 d 1852

== Sources ==
- Priestess of the Occult by Gertrude Marvin Williams, Alfred A Knopf, 1946. OCLC 1162835
- HPB: The Extraordinary Life and Influence of Helena Blavatsky by Sylvia Cranston; G.P. Putnam's Sons, 1993. ISBN 0-87477-688-0
- Biographical notes on Peter von Hahn, etc.
- An Interview with Madame Blavatsky
- Reitemeyer, Frank (Summer 2006). "Open questions in HP Blavatsky's genealogy: review: 'Ein deutschbaltischer Hintergrund der Theosophie?' by Peter Lauer". Fohat: The Mystical, the Magical. 10 (2). Edmonton: Edmonton Theosophical Society: 35–. ISSN 1205-9676.
  Transcribed in "Open questions in H. P. Blavatsky's genealogy". theosophycanada.com. Edmonton: Edmonton Theosophical Society. n.d. Archived from the original on 2008-05-11.
  Review of Laur, Peter (2005). "Ein deutschbaltischer Hintergrund der 'Theosophie'?". Jahrbuch des baltischen Deutschtums (in German). 53 (2006 ed.). Lüneburg: Carl-Schirren-Gesellschaft: 223–232. ISBN 3-923149-51-4. ISSN 0075-2436.
