= Onufry Pietraszkiewicz =

Polish poet (1793–1863)

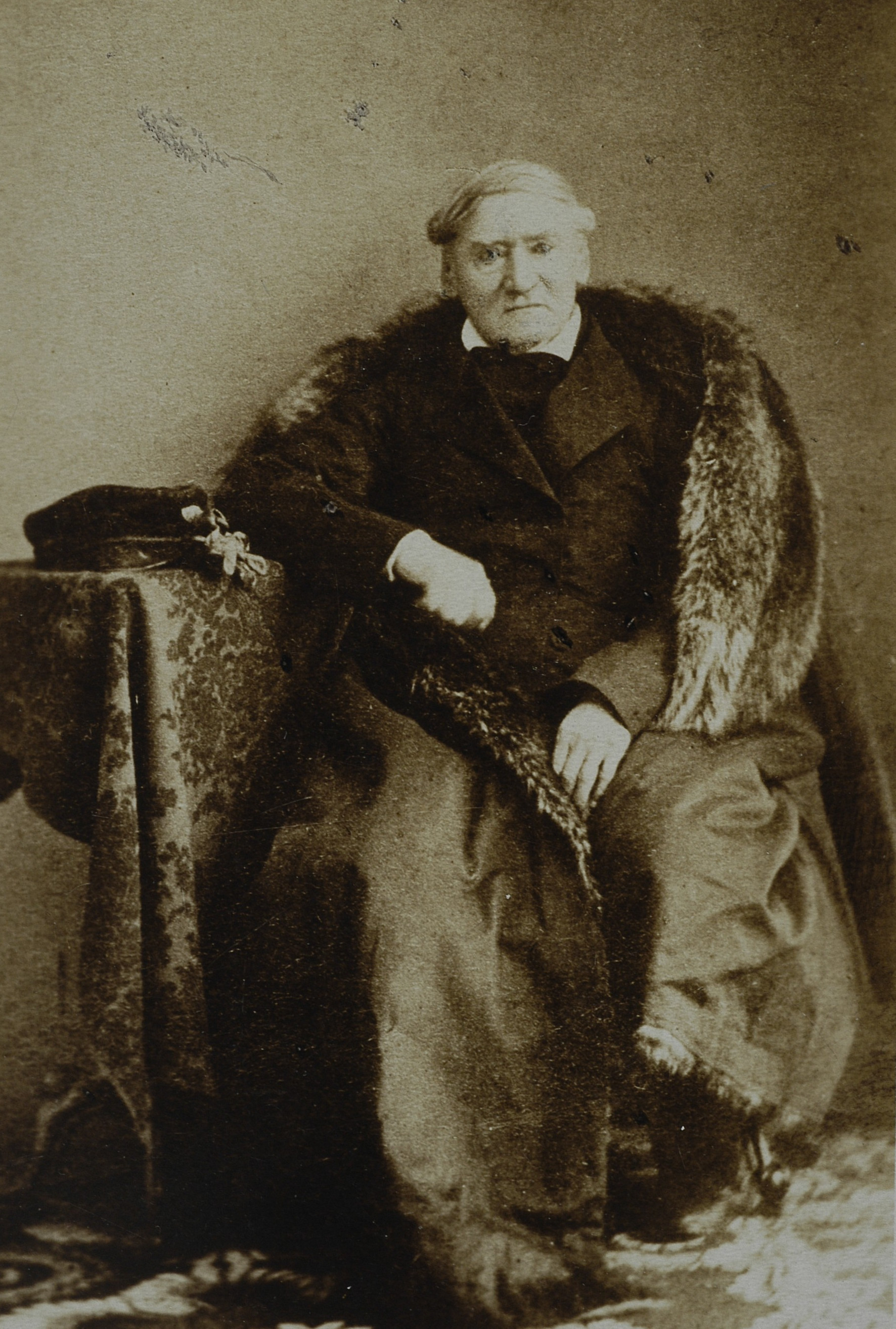
- Portrait of Pietraszkiewicz, 1863
- Born: 1793; Ščiutinas, Trakai Voivodeship, Polish–Lithuanian Commonwealth
- Died: 1863 (aged 69–70); Vilna, Vilna Governorate, Russian Empire
- Resting place: Rasos Cemetery
- Education: Imperial University of Vilnius
- Occupation: Poet
- Organization: Philomath Society

Onufry Pietraszkiewicz (1793–1863) was a Polish poet from Shchuchyn, present-day Belarus. He played a significant role in the cultural and literary scene of his time. Pietraszkiewicz was one of the founders of the Philomaths. Also known as the Philomath Society, it was a secret student organization that emerged in the early 19th century in the Russian-occupied territories of Poland and Lithuania. It played an important role in the cultural and patriotic awakening of the Polish intelligentsia promoting Polish culture, literature, and national identity.

Due to his involvement with the Philomaths and his activism for Polish culture, Pietraszkiewicz came under the scrutiny of the Russian Empire government and was arrested and sentenced to exile. Initially, he was sent to Moscow, but later, after assisting other Polish exiles in their escape attempts, he was sent to Siberia. Pietraszkiewicz continued to support Polish culture and assist fellow exiles during his time in Siberia. His commitment to promoting Polish identity and his activism for the Polish cause earned him respect among other Polish exiles.

After his death in 1863, Pietraszkiewicz was buried at the Rasos Cemetery in Vilnius, which is located in present-day Lithuania. The cemetery holds historical significance and is the resting place for many notable figures from Polish and Lithuanian history.
