= Helene Dolgoruki =

Russian noblewoman

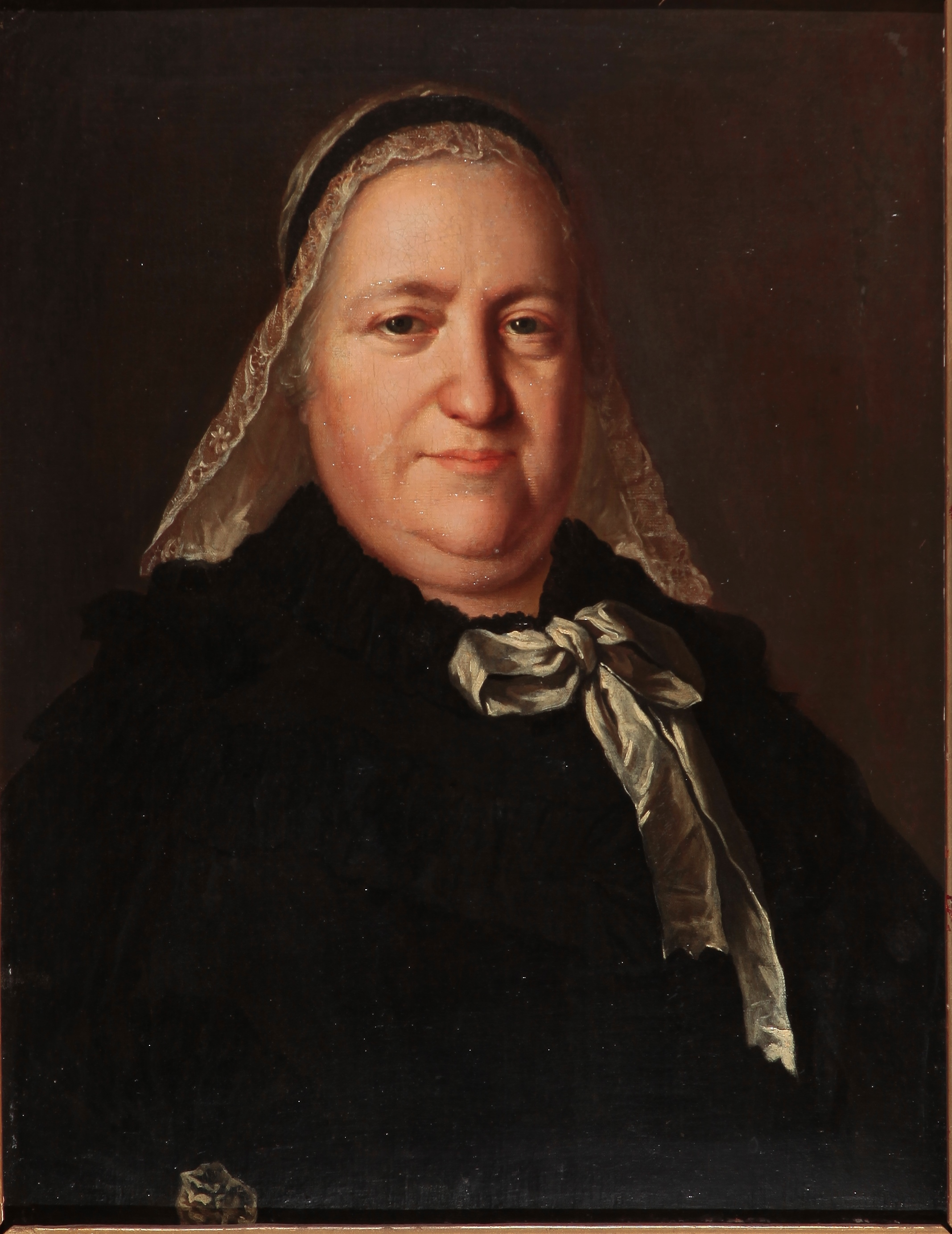
Helene Dolgoruki, c. 1850

Helene Dolgoruki or Elena Pavlovna Dolgorukaya (Russian: Елена Павловна Долгорукая), married name Fadeeva (Russian: Фадеева) (1789–1860), was a Russian noblewoman who was the grandmother of both Sergei Witte and Madame Blavatsky. She took an interest in botany, collected and illustrated plants, coins, spoke several European languages, and corresponded with many scholars of the period including Alexander Humboldt, and Roderick Murchison.

== Birth and marriage ==
Helene was the daughter of Prince Paul Vassilyevich Dolgorukov (1755–1837) and Henrietta Adolfovna de Bandre du Plessis (d. 1812).

In 1813 she married Andrei Mikhailovich Fadeyev (1789–1867) and the family resided near the village of Rzhishchevo, in the Province of Kiev, where the estate of the Dolgorukovs was located.

Helene's eldest daughter Helena Fadeyev married in 1830 the Russian nobleman Peter von Hahn, then a Captain of Horse Artillery in the Russian Army, who was more than twice her age. Soon after the wedding, the Captain received orders to join his regiment for service in the notably ruthless campaign to put down the Polish insurrection of 1831.

The girl-wife returned to her parents in Ekaterinoslav (now Dnipro), in Ukraine, and it was there that Helena was born, prematurely, on the night of August 12, 1831 (July 30, on the Julian calendar). A short time later, the two Helenas rejoined Peter and the family apparently travelled from one Army camp to another as he was reassigned. Three more children were to follow, one of which died as a baby. And in 1842 Helena Fadeyev herself died.

== Grandchildren ==
Shortly, after her daughter's death, in 1842 Peter sent the children, to live with her parents, who were residing at Saratov, where Andrei had been appointed Civil Governor.

Saratov was, a semi-Asiatic city on the Volga, two hundred miles north of Volgograd. "The Governor's palace was a rambling eighteenth-century castle, honeycombed with underground passages." (G. Williams)

Helene Dolgoruki supervised, not only the education of her two granddaughters by her deceased daughter Helena, but also that of her grandson Count Sergei Witte who "learned his letters at her knee." The Witte family lived with the Fadeyev's during this time period. Count Witte's memoirs paint a glowing picture of his grandmother.

== Works and interests ==
Helene Dolgoruki spoke five languages, painted, and knew a great deal about science for her day. She corresponded with distinguished men in many fields; Sir Roderick Murchison, an English geologist and founder of the Royal Geographical Society named a fossil shell for her, the Venus Fadeef.

Her greatest passion was botany. She devoted an entire wing of her palace to a collection of Caucasian flora, each labelled with Latin names and scientific descriptions. All three of her grandchildren left descriptions of this wing in their writings.

== Move to Tiflis ==
Sometime around 1843–1847 General Fadeyev was appointed Imperial Councillor to the Viceroy of the Caucasus (perhaps First Viceroy Count (later Prince) Mikhail Vorontsov although Blavatsky says "Woronzoff"), and the family moved from Saratov to an even more imposing castle at Tiflis. It has been reported that a constant visitor at this time was Prince Alexander Golitsyn (cousin of the wife of the Viceroy), who is said to have been paying court to the granddaughter Helena.

== Last years ==
A frequent visitor to the family at Tiflis, General P S Nikolayeff has left a description of the palatial splendor, in which they lived. The mansion had previously been the home of Prince Chavchavadze. Blavatsky stayed with her again in the last year of her grandmother's life. Helene died in August 1860. Andrei outlived her by a few years.

== Descendants ==
Children of Helene Dolgoruki and Andrei Fadeyev:

- Helena Fadeyev, (1814–42), noted author of 12 books,7 of which were published in her lifetime, and the rest except 1 after. (writing as Zenaida R.) and wife (in 1830) of Peter Hahn, parents of Blavatsky. Her books included: The Ideal, Utballa, Jelalu'd-din, Theophania Abbiadjio, Medallion, Lubonka, A Box at the Odessa Opera, The World's Judgment, and a Fruitless Gift. She is the subject of a biographical sketch by Catherine Nekrasova in the magazine Russian Days of Yore, and also one by Bobritsky. Both of her surviving children also became authors, Helena Blavatsky most famously as the founder of the Theosophical Society in 1875, and her sister Vera Zelihovsky as a writer of children's stories.
- Catherine Fadeyev, wife of Julius Witte (also known as Yuli) and parents of Sergei Witte, Finance Minister of Russia (1892–1902); Prime Minister of Russia (1902–1906)
- General Rostislav Andreyevich de Fadeyev, (1824–1884 unmarried), Joint Secretary of State at the Ministry of the Interior
- Nadya Fadeyev (1829–1919 unmarried) and member of the Council of the Theosophical Society

== See also ==
- Dolgorukov

== Sources ==
- Biographical notes on Peter von Hahn, etc.
- 'Priestess of the Occult', Gertrude Marvin Williams. Alfred Knopf, 1946.
- Memoirs, Count S Y Witte. New York, 1921.
- An Interview with Blavatsky
- HPB: The Extraordinary Life and Influence of Helena Blavatsky by Sylvia Cranston, G. P. Putnam's Sons, 1993.
