= Shchuchyn =

Shchuchyn Шчучын (Belarusian) Щучин (Russian) Szczuczyn
- Town
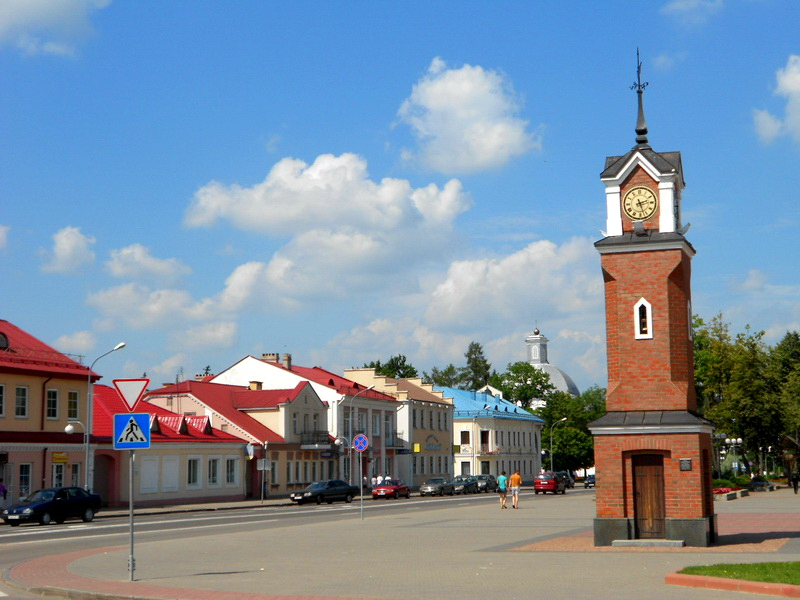
- Freedom Square in Shchuchyn

- Flag Coat of arms

- Location within Belarus
- Coordinates: 53°37′N 24°44′E
- Country: Belarus
- Region: Grodno Region
- District: Shchuchyn District

Population (2025)
  - Total: 15,127
- Time zone: UTC+3 (MSK)
- Postal code: 231511, 231513
- Area code: +375 1514
- License plate: 4
- Website: schuchin.grodno-region.by

Shchuchyn (Note: Belarusian: Шчучын, romanized: Ščučyn,; Russian: Щучин, romanized: Shchuchin, IPA: [ˈɕːʉtɕɪn]; Polish: Szczuczyn; Lithuanian: Ščiutinas; Yiddish: שטשוטשין, romanized: Shtshutshin.) is a town in Grodno Region, in western Belarus. It serves as the administrative center of Shchuchyn District. As of 2025, it has a population of 15,127.

== History ==
The first known official written mention of Shchuchyn is recorded in 1436, but its foundation as a settlement dates back to 1537, when Shchuchyn was mentioned in the Book of Acts of the Lithuanian Metrica (the Book of Lithuanian vital records), kept in the Governmental archive in Lithuania.

Ownership of Shchuchyn passed from one noble family to another: the Radziwiłł family, the Scipions, the Drucki-Lubeckis, and others ruled Shchuchyn in turn. It was a private town, administratively located in the Lida County in the Vilnius Voivodeship. In the first half of the 17th century, Shchuchyn was governed by the outsider marshal of the Lithuanian principality, Scipio de Campo. Shchuchyn was an average-sized privately owned village in terms of population.

A Catholic Monasterial Order was established 1726 in Shchuchyn by the resolution of the Sejm. A notable Piarist College was founded. In 1742, Teresa Scypionowa founded a monastery of the Congregation of the Sisters of Our Lady of Mercy and a hospital.

Shchuchyn was subject to ruin and ravage more than once in its history. The biggest was in the time of the North War, after the town was seized by the Swedish king Karl XII. After the Third Partition of Poland in 1795, the town became a part of the Russian Empire. In June 1812 Shchuchyn was occupied by French troops. During World War I, in 1915, it was occupied by Germany. In 1919 the Red Army attempted to seize the territory land by taking and fortifying the Martinkantsy - Shchuchyn - Shchara - lake Vygonovskoe line. However, the superior defence forces of the "Land of Grodnenskaya", together with Poland, forced the Red Army back.

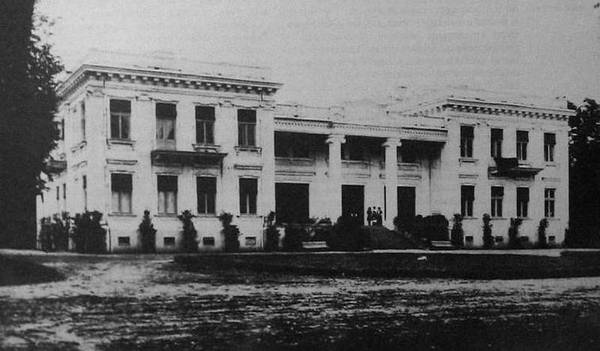
Drucki-Lubecki Palace in the interbellum

Afterwards it was administratively located in the Lida powiat in the Nowogródek Voivodeship of interwar Poland. According to the 1921 census, the population was 63.1% Jewish, 36.3% Polish and 0.6% Belarusian.

During World War II, the town was first occupied by the Soviet Union, then by Nazi Germany from 25 June 1941 until 13 July 1944, and re-occupied by the Soviet Union afterwards. German forces killed about 2,180 Jews from the Shchuchyn ghetto, with the majority of them killed on 10 May 1942.

In 1962, Shchuchyn was granted town status.

== Air base ==
Until the collapse of the Soviet Union Shchuchyn was a home of one of the biggest Soviet air bases with over 5,000 personnel assigned to it in the 1990s. The history of the Soviet air force presence in the city goes back into 1941 with a wing of Polikarpov I-16. The air base hosted different types of the Soviet planes throughout the years, such as IL-28, MiG-15, MiG-19, An-14, MiG-21, MiG-23, MiG-25, and others. Most famously in the early 1990s it was a home of about 40 MiG-25BM defense-suppression aircraft, which represents the vast majority of this modification of MiG-25 ever produced. The base was controlled by the 95th air wing. The base's runway is 2,500 meters long.

== Economy ==
The economy of Shchuchyn is primarily based on agriculture, food processing, and timber production. Major businesses are JSC “Shchuchyn plant “Avtoprovod” (found in 1958), JSC "Shchuchyn butter-cheese factory" and a bread factory.

== Demographics ==
Historical population

| Year | Pop. | ±% |
|---|---|---|
| 1833 | 327 | — |
| 1866 | 1,088 | +232.7% |
| 1897 | 1,742 | +60.1% |
| 1921 | 1,539 | −11.7% |
| 1940 (est.) | 3,500 | +127.4% |
| 1959 (est.) | 6,500 | +85.7% |

| Year | Pop. | ±% |
|---|---|---|
| 1970 (est.) | 10,300 | +58.5% |
| 1991 (est.) | 14,400 | +39.8% |
| 2002 (est.) | 16,300 | +13.2% |
| 2006 (est.) | 15,800 | −3.1% |
| 2009 | 15,042 | −4.8% |
| 2023 | 15,653 | +4.1% |

Distribution of the population by ethnicity according to the 2009 census:

| | percent |
| Belarusians | 43.96% |
| Poles | 38.98% |
| Russians | 13.11% |
| Ukrainians | 2.72% |
| Tatars | 0.09% |
| Armenians | 0.08% |

== Notable people ==
- Onufry Pietraszkiewicz (1793–1863), poet
- be:Вядомыя асобы Шчучына

== Climate ==
The Köppen Climate Classification subtype for this climate is "Dfb" (Warm Summer Continental Climate).

== Sources ==
- "Щучин, местечко Виленской губернии" . Brockhaus and Efron Encyclopedic Dictionary (in Russian). 1906.
