= Alexander Smirdin =

Russian publisher and editor (1795-1857)

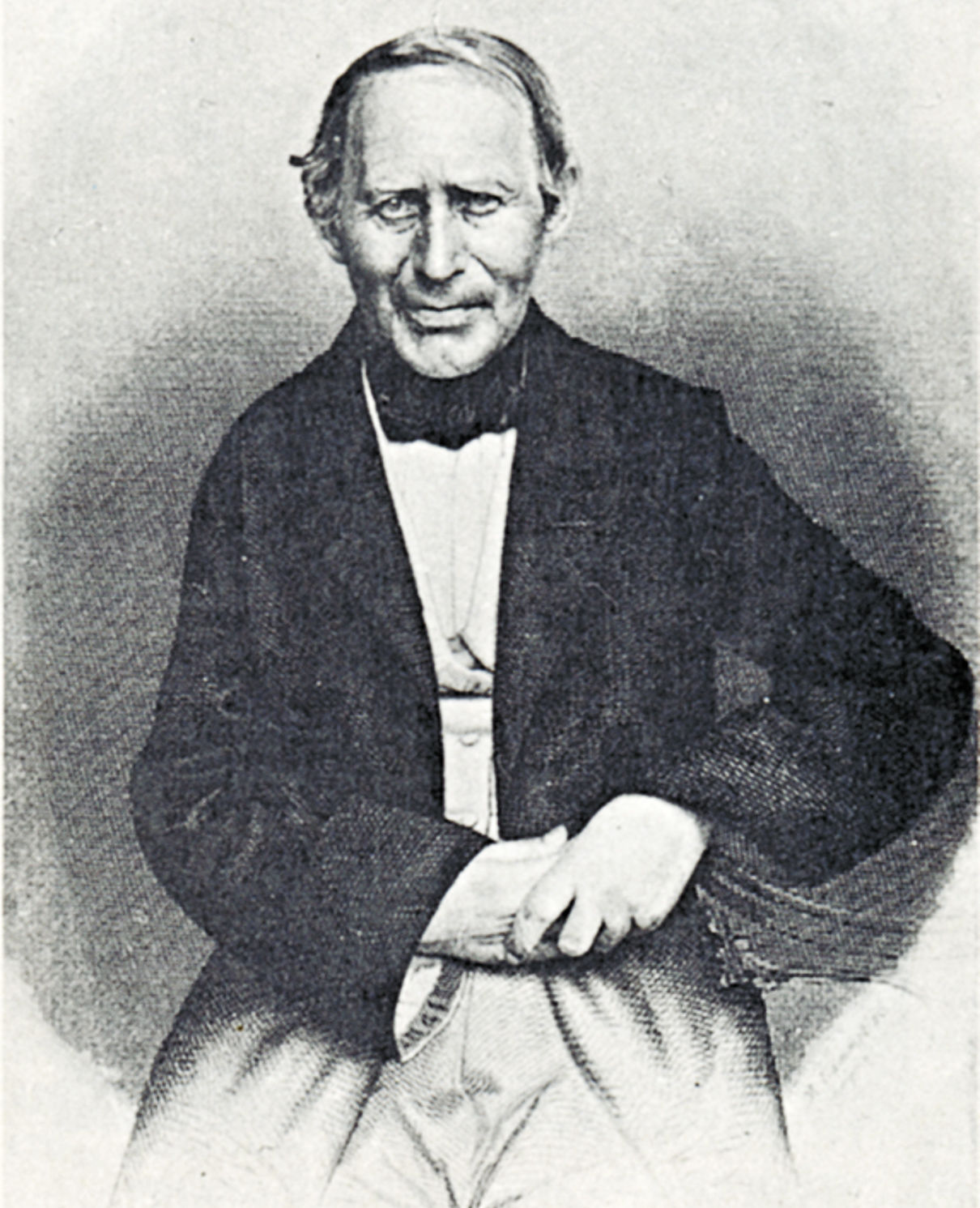
- Born: Александр Филиппович Смирдин; February 1, 1795; Moscow, Russian Empire
- Died: September 28, 1857 (aged 62); Saint Petersburg, Russian Empire
- Occupations: publisher, editor

Alexander Filippovich Smirdin (Russian: Александр Филиппович Смирдин; 1 February 1795, in Moscow, Russian Empire – 28 September 1857, in Saint Petersburg, Russian Empire) was a Russian publisher and editor. Smirdin was the first in Russia to start selling books cheap enough to make them accessible to wide readership, and to develop the standard set of financial criteria for paying authors. He maintained strong links with the country's literary elite and, in retrospect, played a key role in the development of Russian literature in the early 19th century. Smirdin published all the best known works by Nikolai Karamzin, Vasily Zhukovsky, Alexander Pushkin, Ivan Krylov (all of whom he had fine personal relations with) as well as numerous textbooks and seminal books on history and science.

In 1846–1855 he published the book series, Полное собрание сочинений русских авторов (Polnoe sobranie sočinenij russkich avtorov) (English, "The Complete Works of Russian Authors"), which influenced "the formation of the classical canon" of Russian literature.

In 1834 he launched Biblioteka Dlya Chtenya (Russian: Библиоте́ка для чте́ния, English: The Library for Reading) the most popular magazine of the time and a precursor for the so-called 'thick journals culture' in Russia. In 1838 he started publishing another magazine, Syn Otechestva, edited first by Nikolai Polevoy, then by Nikolai Grech.

Smirdin's extraordinary generosity (he paid Pushkin, famously, a chervonets per line; in Revizor Khlestakov boasts: "Smirding pays me forty thousand" [per book, as proofreader]) in the long run proved to be his undoing. Strong support by the Russian government notwithstanding, in the mid-1840s he was declared bankrupt, lost all of his property (including the vast library, bought eventually by Pyotr Krasheninnikov, another prominent Russian bookseller) and spent the rest of his life in poverty.
