= Osip Senkovsky =

Russian journalist (1800–1858)

- Осип Сенковский
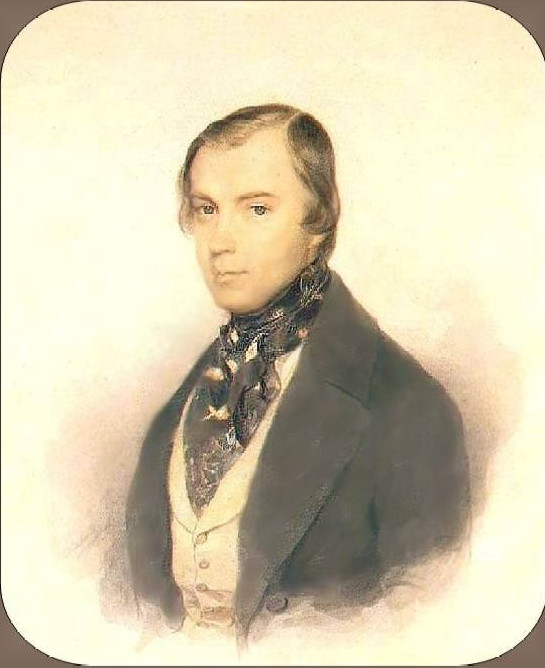
- Born: Józef Julian Sękowski; 31 March 1800; Antagaluonė, Russian Empire
- Died: 16 March 1858 (aged 57); St. Petersburg, Russian Empire
- Occupations: Orientalist; journalist; entertainer

Osip Ivanovich Senkovsky (Russian: О́сип Ива́нович Сенко́вский; 31 March [O.S. 19 March] 1800 – 16 March [O.S. 4 March] 1858), born Józef-Julian Sękowski, was a Polish–Russian orientalist, journalist and entertainer.

== Life ==
Senkovsky was born on his mother's estate in Antagaluonė, located some 30 miles (48 km) away from Vilnius. His father was Jan Sękowski; his mother came from the Bujko family, of Belarusian-German roots, but with a Polish national identity.

He attended the piarist college in Minsk, and later Vilnius University. During his study there he became fascinated with all things oriental. In the years 1817–1822 he was closely associated with the Society of Scoundrels and contributed articles to their periodical "Wiadomości Brukowe" ('The Street News').

=== Oriental travels and later professorship ===
Having mastered the Arabic, Persian, Turkish, and Hebrew languages, he went onto a journey to Turkey, Liban, Egypt, Nubia and Abisina, leaving Vilnius on 1 September 1819. The journey was financed from private savings, as well as by the Royal Society of Friends of Science in Warsaw, the Polish press, and scholarly institutions in Vilnius. In 1821, he returned to the Russian capital, where he got the chair in oriental languages at the University of Saint Petersburg.

As a professor at the principal Russian university, he continued his cooperation with main Polish scholarly institutions, and the Polish press in St Petersburg. He also maintained contacts with the Philomaths residing in St Petersburg, including Ignacy Daniłowicz, Józef Jeżowski, Franciszek Malewski, and others. He likewise met with Adam Mickiewicz during the latter’s stays in St. Petersburg in 1824–1825 and 1827–1828.

=== As a writer ===
In the 1820s, Senkovsky started publishing in the popular periodicals of Kondraty Ryleyev and Faddei Bulgarin. He is best remembered for having edited the first Russian "thick journal," Biblioteka Dlya Chteniya ('Library for Reading', 1833–1856), whose lively and humorous style (as Nikolai Gogol put it) attracted to literary journals even those people who had never held a book in their hands.

Senkovsky encouraged new writers. He had a strong influence on Yelena Hahn and Elizaveta Akhmatova. In the latter case he not only developed a writer but she regarded him as a parent, Akhmatova would eventually publish her own magazines and in time her own memoir of Senkowsky.

A prolific writer, Senkovsky contributed articles on a wide range of topics, from mathematics to medicine.

Arguably the best known book of Senkovsky was the 1833 book Фантастические путешествия Барона Брамбеуса published under the pen-name of Baron Brambeus. It contained three satirical fantastic voyages: The Poetic Jorney Around the World (Поэтическое путешествие по белу-свету), to quench the thirst for "strong sensations", to an antediluvian Egyptian civilization flourishing on the now-frozen Siberian plain (The Scientific Journey to Bear Island), and to the center of the Earth (The Sentimental Journey to Mount Etna, Сентиментальное путешествие на гору Этну).

Besides "Baron Brambeus", Senkovsky used over forty fancy pen names: "доктор Карл фон Биттервассер", "Тютюнджю-оглу Мустафа-ага", "Буки-Буки", "Иван Иванов сын Хохотенко-Хлопотунов-Пустяковский, отставной подпоручик, помещик разных губерний и кавалер беспорочности", "Делюбардар", "пограничный толмач Разумник Артамонов сын Байбаков", etc., many with elaborated biographies.

As a literary critic he had few principles, his motto being "easy reading and less thought". One day he would pronounce his friend Nestor Kukolnik to be Gogol's superior, only to place Gogol higher than Homer the very next day. He dismissed The Tale of Igor's Campaign as a clumsy fake, derogated Alexander Pushkin as a second-hand imitator, and declared the Tale of Bygone Years to be written in Polish.

During his last years, Senkovsky turned from literature to music. He claimed to have invented a five-stringed violin and a new type of oven. He also published pioneering studies of Chinese, Mongolian, and Tibetan languages.

He has been referred to as the founder of Litvinism.

== Sources ==
- "Сенковский, Осип-Юлиан Иванович" . Brockhaus and Efron Encyclopedic Dictionary (in Russian). 1906.
