= Jan Czeczot =

Polish Romantic poet and ethnographer

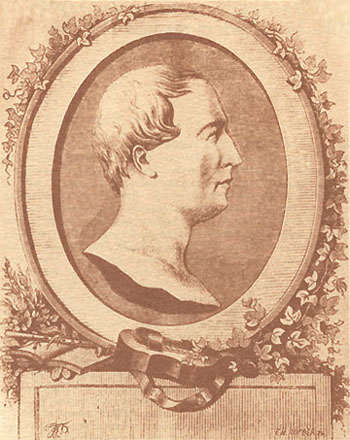
- Born: 24 June 1796; Małušyčy, Lithuania Governorate, Russian Empire
- Died: 23 August 1847 (aged 48); Druskininkai, Russian Empire
- Resting place: Ratnyčia, Druskininkai, Lithuania
- Occupations: writer; folklorist; ethnographer; librarian
- Writing career
- Language: Polish, Belarusian
- Genre: Romanticism

Jan Czeczot of Ostoja (Belarusian: Ян Чачот, Jan Čačot, Lithuanian: Jonas Čečiotas, 1796–1847) was a Polish romantic poet and Belarusian folklorist and ethnographer. Fascinated by the folklore and the traditional folk songs of the former Grand Duchy of Lithuania, a confederal part of the Polish–Lithuanian Commonwealth, he recollected hundreds of them in his works. Inspired by them, he also wrote several poems in what could be considered a pre-modern Belarusian language. As such, he is often cited as one of the first Polish ethnographers and one of the predecessors of the Belarusian national revival.

== Biography ==
Ostoja Coat of Arms

Jan Czeczot was born on 24 June 1796 in a noble family that was part of the Clan of Ostoja family of Tadeusz Czeczot in Małuszyce (Małušyčy, now in Hrodna Voblast) near Navahrudak. He graduated from a Dominican school in Navahrudak and then joined the Vilna Academy in 1816. There, he made friends with many of the predecessors of Polish romanticism, among them Adam Mickiewicz, who is said to support Czeczot's early poetic writings. Their friendship was immortalized in the dedication to Mickiewicz's III part of Dziady. Also, Czeczot became the secretary of the Philomatic Society and a friend of Ignacy Domejko, with whom he shared passion for the folklore. After the society was discovered by the Russian secret police in 1823, Czeczot was arrested and sent to Siberia. After his sentence was completed, he relocated to central Russia and in 1833 settled in Lepiel.

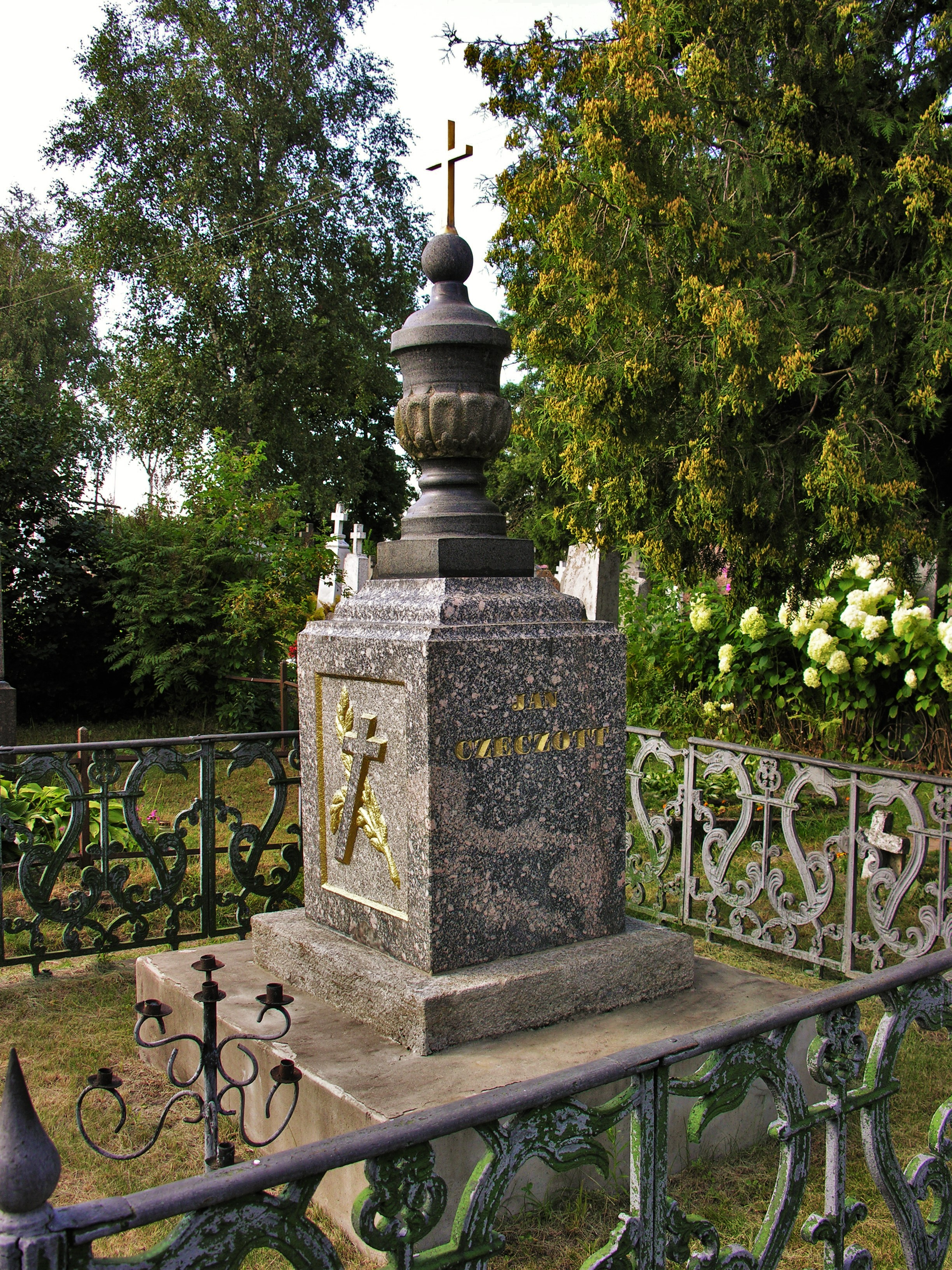
Grave of Jan Czeczot in Ratnyčia

In 1837 he was allowed to publish his first book, the Piosnki wieśniacze znad Niemna (Folk Songs of the Neman River). The second edition of that anthology, published in 1844 under the title of Piosnki wieśniacze znad Niemna z dołączeniem pierwotwornych w mowie słowiańsko-krewickiej (Folk Songs of the Neman River with Originals Written in Slavic-Krevich Language), was significantly expanded and included many translations of his works to what could be seen as a predecessor of the modern Belarusian language. It was not until 1839 when he finally was allowed to return home. Unable to find a job, for five years he was working as a librarian in a family estate of his family's friends, the Chrebtowicze family. He never fully recovered after his resettlement to Siberia. In 1846 he went to the spa of Druskininkai, but the treatment was unsuccessful and Jan Czeczot died on 23 August of the following year. He is buried in a small cemetery in Ratnyčia in Lithuania.

Several of his works published in the latter part of his life gained much popularity. Among the fans of his poetry was composer Stanisław Moniuszko, who even decided to illustrate some of his poems with music.

== See also ==
- Ostoja coat of arms
- Clan of Ostoja
