= Aleksander Chodźko =

Polish poet, Slavist and Iranologist

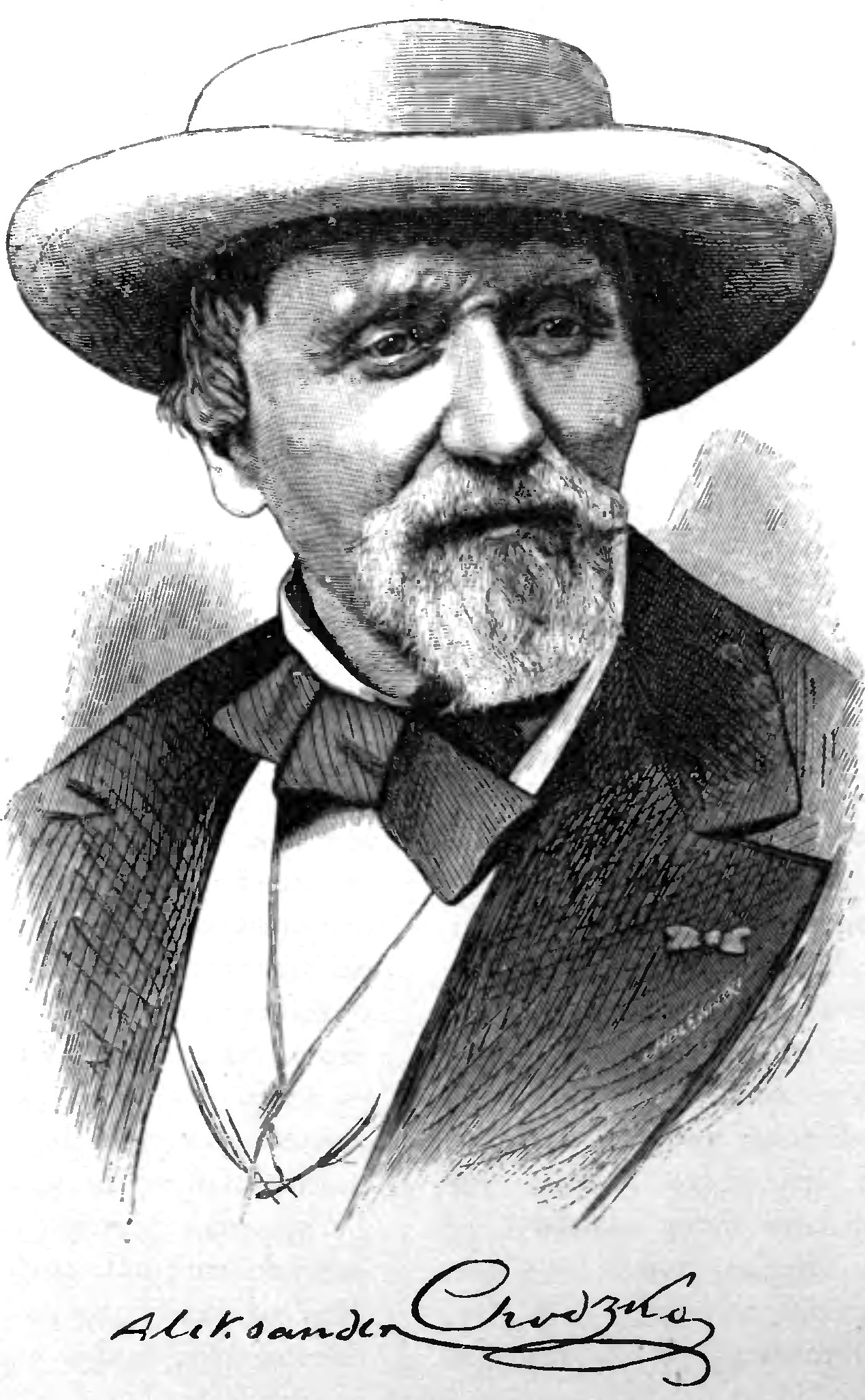
- Aleksander Chodźko
- Born: 30 August 1804; Krzywicze, Vileysky Uyezd, Minsk Governorate, Russian Empire
- Died: 27 December 1891 (aged 87); Noisy-le-Sec, France
- Education: Imperial University of Vilnius
- Occupations: Poet, Slavist, and Iranologist
- Relatives: Leonard Chodźko

Aleksander Borejko Chodźko (30 August 1804 – 27 December 1891) was a Polish poet, Slavist, and Iranologist.

== Early life ==
He was born in Krzywicze, in the Minsk Governorate of the Russian Empire (present-day Belarus) and attended the Imperial University of Vilnius. He was a member of the Filaret Association and the Institute of Oriental Studies that was attached to the Ministry of Foreign Affairs of the Russian Empire in Saint Petersburg.

== Career ==
From 1830 until 1844 he worked as a Russian diplomat in Iran. From 1852 until 1855 he worked for the French Foreign Ministry in Paris. He succeeded Adam Mickiewicz in the chair of Slavic languages and literatures in the Collège de France, holding the post from 1857 until 1883.

He was a member of the Royal Asiatic Society of Great Britain and Ireland and the Société de Linguistique de Paris.

== Partial bibliography ==
Translation by

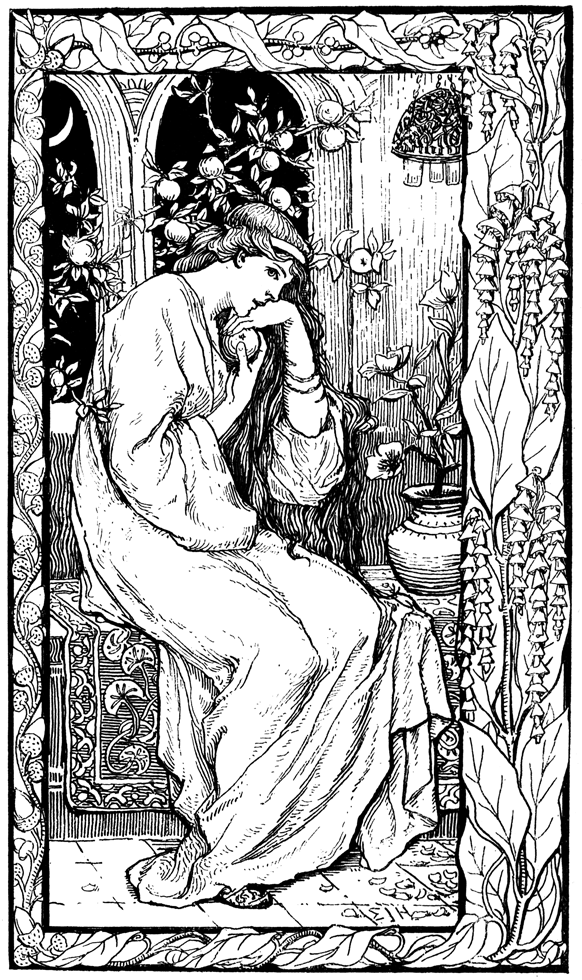
Emily J. Harding; Fairy Tales of the Slav Peasants and Herdsmen. Frontispiz (1896)

=== Persia ===
- Popular Poetry of Persia. Specimens of the popular poetry of Persia, orally collected and translated with philological and historical notes. London: Oriental Translation Fund, 1842.
- Specimens of the Popular Poetry of Persia. London, 1842.
- Theatre persan. Paris, 1878.
- Le Deisme des ti'ahhabis in the Journal Asiatique, series iv. vol. xi. pp. 168.
- The Chodzko Collection. 33 scripts collected Chodźko preserved in the Bibliothèque Nationale of Paris. Also known as The Islamic Drama by Jamshid Malekpour.

=== Slav ===
- Polish-English and English-Polish Dictionary (1851)
- Fairy Tales of the Slav Peasants and Herdsmen. London. (Translated by Emily J. Harding)
- The Twelve Months: A Slav Legend appeared in Good Stories for Great Holidays, by Frances J. Olcott (2006 BiblioBazaar, LLC)
- Les chants historiques de l'Ukraine (Paris; reprinted by Bibliolife, 2008). 284 pp.

=== Ballads and poems ===
- Ballad Maliny
- Poezye Alex. St. Petersburg, 1828 (2nd edition, Poznan, 1833). Wikimedia Commons has a file available.
