= Syn otechestva =

Russian literary magazine

- Categories: Literary magazine
- Founded: 1812
- Final issue: 1852
- Country: Russian Empire
- Based in: Saint Petersburg
- Language: Russian

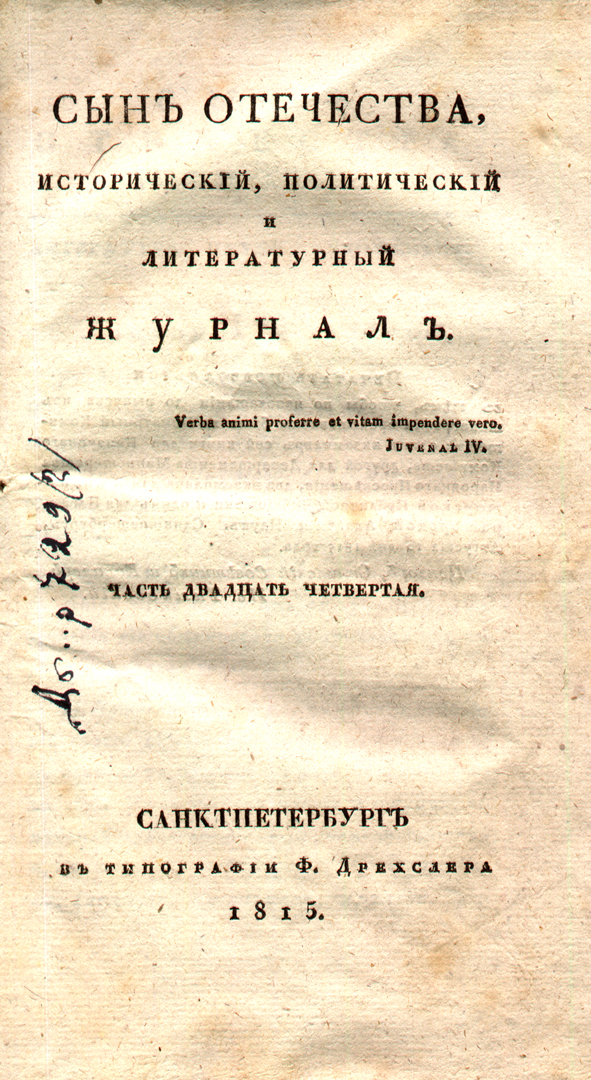
Syn otechestva, 1815

Syn otechestva (Russian: Сын отечества), which translates as Son of the Fatherland, was a Russian literary magazine published in Saint Petersburg from 1812 to 1852. It was influential in the development of social thought and literature in Russia.

The magazine was edited by Nikolai Gretsch between 1812 and 1837. His main assistant was Faddei Bulgarin. Syn otechestva was Russia's most influential magazine between the Napoleonic Wars and the Decembrist Revolt. It grew increasingly conservative after Nicholas I's accession to the throne, losing liberal-minded readers to Sovremennik and Otechestvennye Zapiski. In 1837, Gretsch and Bulgarin sold Syn otechestva to Alexander Smirdin. Later editors included Nikolai Polevoy, Alexandr Nikitenko, and Osip Senkovsky.

Another magazine of the same name was published in Russian from 1856 to 1861 and a newspaper with the same name was published in Russian from 1862 to 1901.
