= Józef Jeżowski =

Polish philologist (1793–1855)

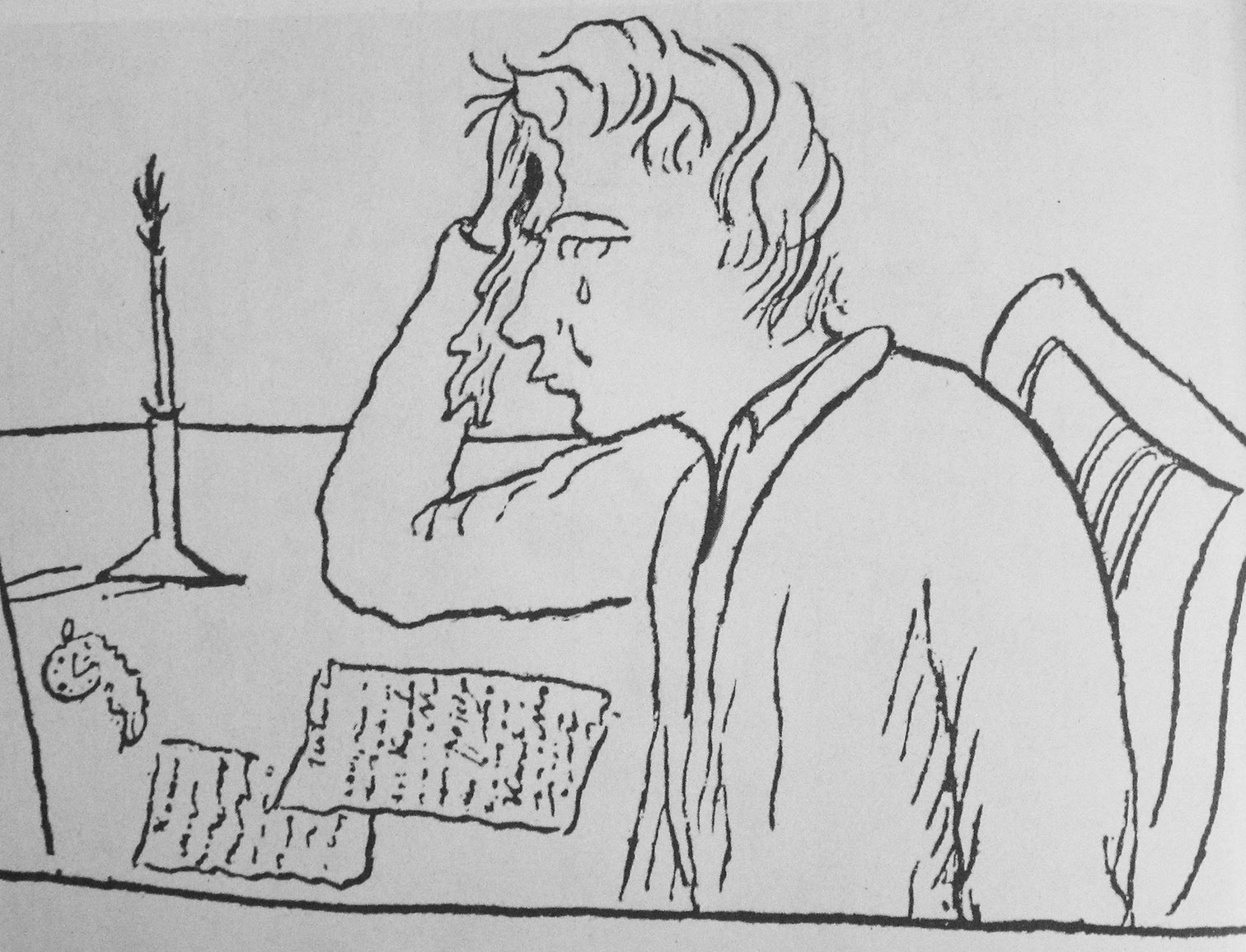
- Józef Jeżowski, Autocaricature (1821)

Józef Jeżowski (1793–1855) was a Polish classical philologist, poet, translator, founding member and former president of the Philomatic Association. He was a friend of Adam Mickiewicz and Tomasz Zan.

Józef graduated from high school in Uman, and studied classical philology at the Vilnius Imperial University. In 1824, he was convicted by the Russian Empire activity for pro-Polish activity and exiled into Russia. At 1829, he was allowed to lecture at Kazan State University as a professor, and later at Moscow University.

Around 1821 to 1823, he published the poem Horace: More Apt Odes with Explanations, in Vilnius, Lithuania. He also published Horatius' Ode More Accurate in 1824, and Homer's Odyssey (in Latin) with annotations in 1828, both books also being published in Vilnius, Lithuania.

Having returned from exile, he settled in Kaniv, Ukraine.
