= Antoni Edward Odyniec =

Polish Romantic-era poet (1804–1885)

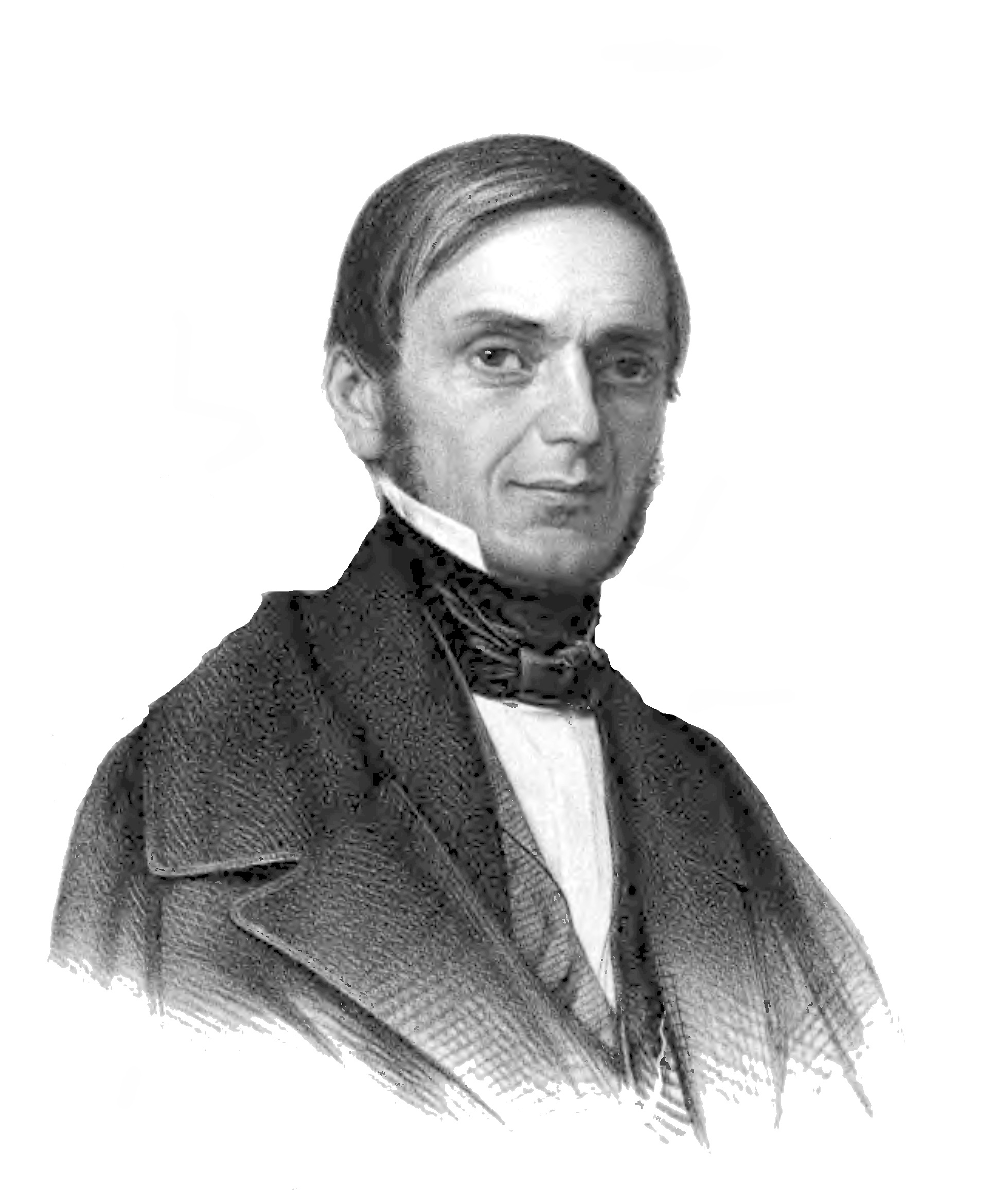
Antoni Edward Odyniec. Portrait by Maksymilian Fajans.

Antoni Edward Odyniec (25 January 1804 – 15 January 1885) was a Polish Romantic-era poet who penned the celebrated "Song of the Filaretes".

Said to be an imitator of his friend Adam Mickiewicz, Odyniec made his mark as a translator of works by writers, including Walter Scott, Byron, Friedrich Schiller and Pushkin. He was also an organizer of the literary scene and author of colourful memoirs that described the private lives of writers, especially Mickiewicz.

== Life ==
Odyniec was born in Giejstuny, Oszmiana County, now in Belarus, in 1804.

Odyniec was an alumnus of Wilno University, where he was a member of the Filaret Association and a defendant, along with Mickiewicz and others, in the 1824 trial of Association members.

In 1825 he published his first collection of short works and lived in Warsaw. In 1829–30 he accompanied his fellow poet and ex-Filaret Adam Mickiewicz on a tour of Germany, Italy and Switzerland, recounted in somewhat embroidered Listy z podróży (Travel Letters).

The grave of Antoni Edward Odyniec at the Old Powązki cemetery in Warsaw

In 1831 Odyniec settled in Dresden, in Saxony, where he translated works by Walter Scott, Byron and Thomas Moore. He also co-edited a "Library of Polish Classics," and wrote for Przyjaciel Ludu (The Friend of the People), published in Leszno.

In 1837 he returned to Wilno (Vilnius), where he edited Gluksberg's Encyklopedia Powszechna (Universal Encyclopedia) and, in 1840–63, Kurier Wileński (The Wilno Courier).

In 1866 Odyniec returned to Warsaw, where he edited Kurier Warszawski (The Warsaw Courier) and published in Kronika Rodzinna (The Family Chronicle) his Travel Letters and Remembrances of the Past, As Told to Deotyma. He died in Warsaw in 1885.

He penned ballads, songs and legends, published in Poezje (Poems, 2 vols., 1825–26); dramatic works, including Barbara Radziwiłłówna (1858); translations of works by Gottfried August Bürger, Byron, Walter Scott (3 vols., 1838–44); and Wspomnienia z przeszłości opowiadane Deotymie (Remembrances of the Past, As Told to Deotyma, 1884).

== See also ==
- List of Poles
- Filaret Association
