= Vera Zhelikhovskaya =

Russian writer (1835–1896)

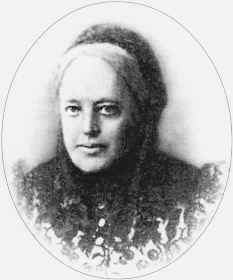
Vera Zhelikhovsky.

Vera Zhelikhovsky (Russian: Ве́ра Петро́вна Желихо́вская; Ukrainian: Віра Желіховська Петрівна; April 29, 1835 – May 17, 1896), sometimes transliterated as Vera Jelihovsky, was a Russian writer, mostly of children's stories. She was Madame Blavatsky's sister.

Vera Zhelikhovsky also wrote fantastic stories with heroes having secret knowledge like Cornelius Agrippa, shamans, and Oriental magicians.

== English translations ==
- The General's Will, (Short novel), from Mystery Tales, The Continental Classics Vol 18, Harper and Brothers, 1909.

== Sources ==
- "Желиховская, Вера Петровна" . Brockhaus and Efron Encyclopedic Dictionary (in Russian). 1906.
