= Nikolay Gretsch =

Russian grammarian (1787–1867)

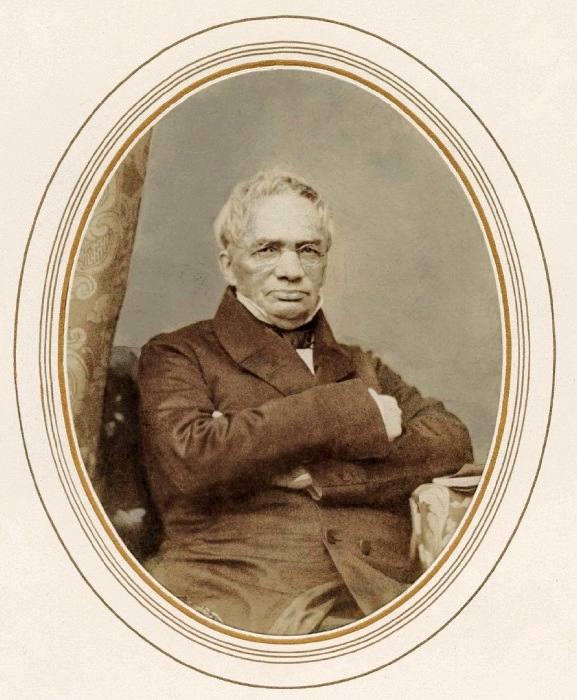
Nikolay Gretsch, 1856

Nikolay Ivanovich Gretsch or Grech (Russian: Николай Иванович Греч; 1787–1867) was a Russian grammarian. Although he was primarily interested in philology, it is as a journalist that he is primarily remembered.

== Life ==
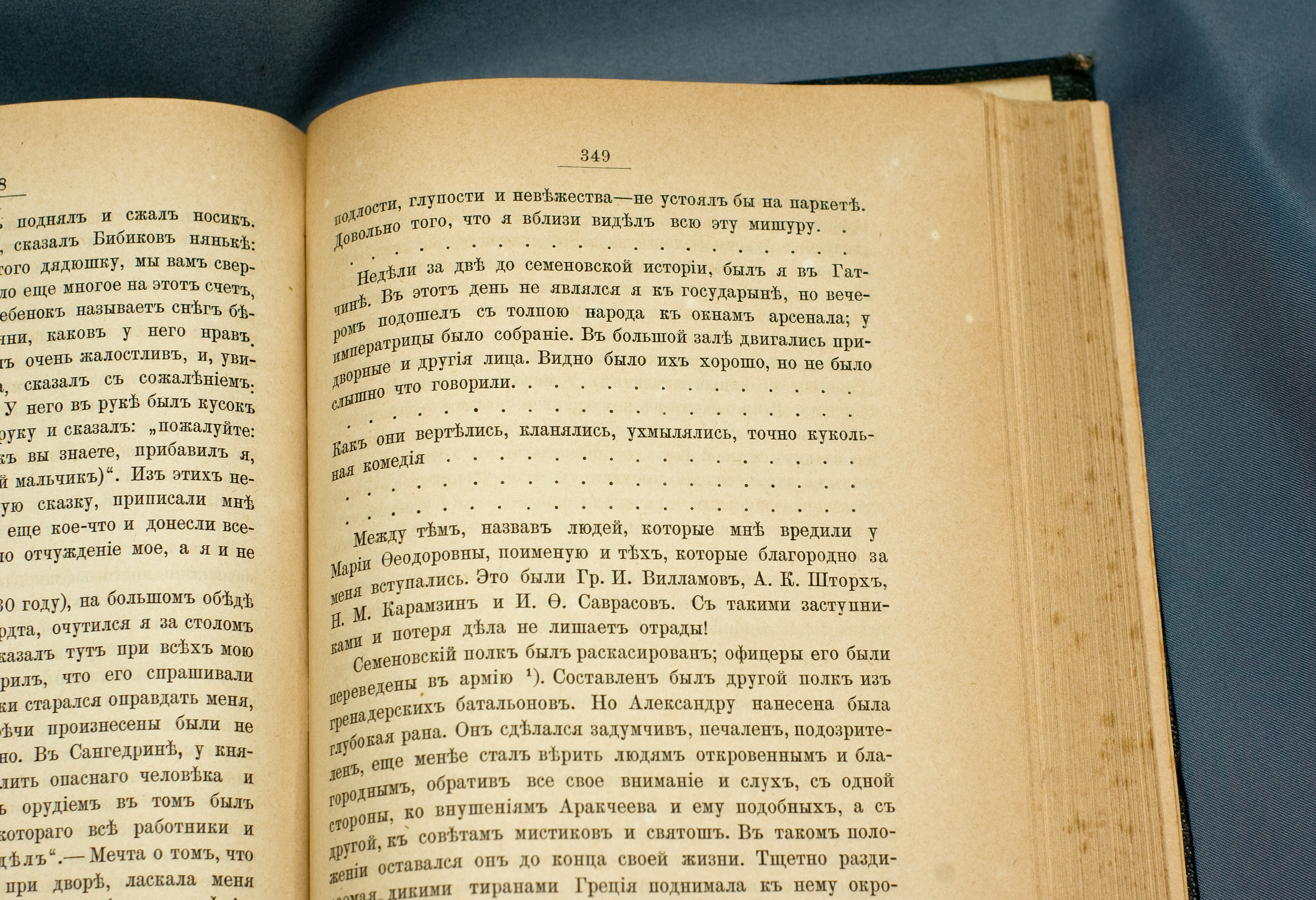
A 19th-century edition of Gretch's memoirs: the censored text is replaced by dots

Gretsch came from a noble Baltic German family. Peter Clodt von Jürgensburg was his wife's nephew. He attended the Imperial School of Jurisprudence and travelled widely in Europe, producing no less than five volumes of travel writings as well as several novels. He introduced the Lancasterian system of education into Russia (1820), organized several innovative schools for soldiers and penned a number of textbooks for them. His memoirs were published in 1886.

At the time of Napoleon's invasion of Russia Gretsch started publishing The Son of the Fatherland, a periodical that expressed liberal views that had much in common with those of the Decembrists. During Nicholas I's reactionary reign he crossed over to the conservative camp and joined forces with Faddei Bulgarin in feuding with Pushkin's circle.

Gretch and Bulgarin were the editors of Northern Bee, a popular political and literary newspaper that championed the Official Nationality theory. According to Nicholas V. Riasanovsky, the newspaper "strikes a modern reader as deficient in interpretation, weak intellectually, and devoted almost entirely to factual, quasi-official summaries of events".

== Sources ==
- "Греч, Николай Иванович" . Brockhaus and Efron Encyclopedic Dictionary (in Russian). 1906.
