= Franciszek Malewski =

Lithuanian-Polish lawyer

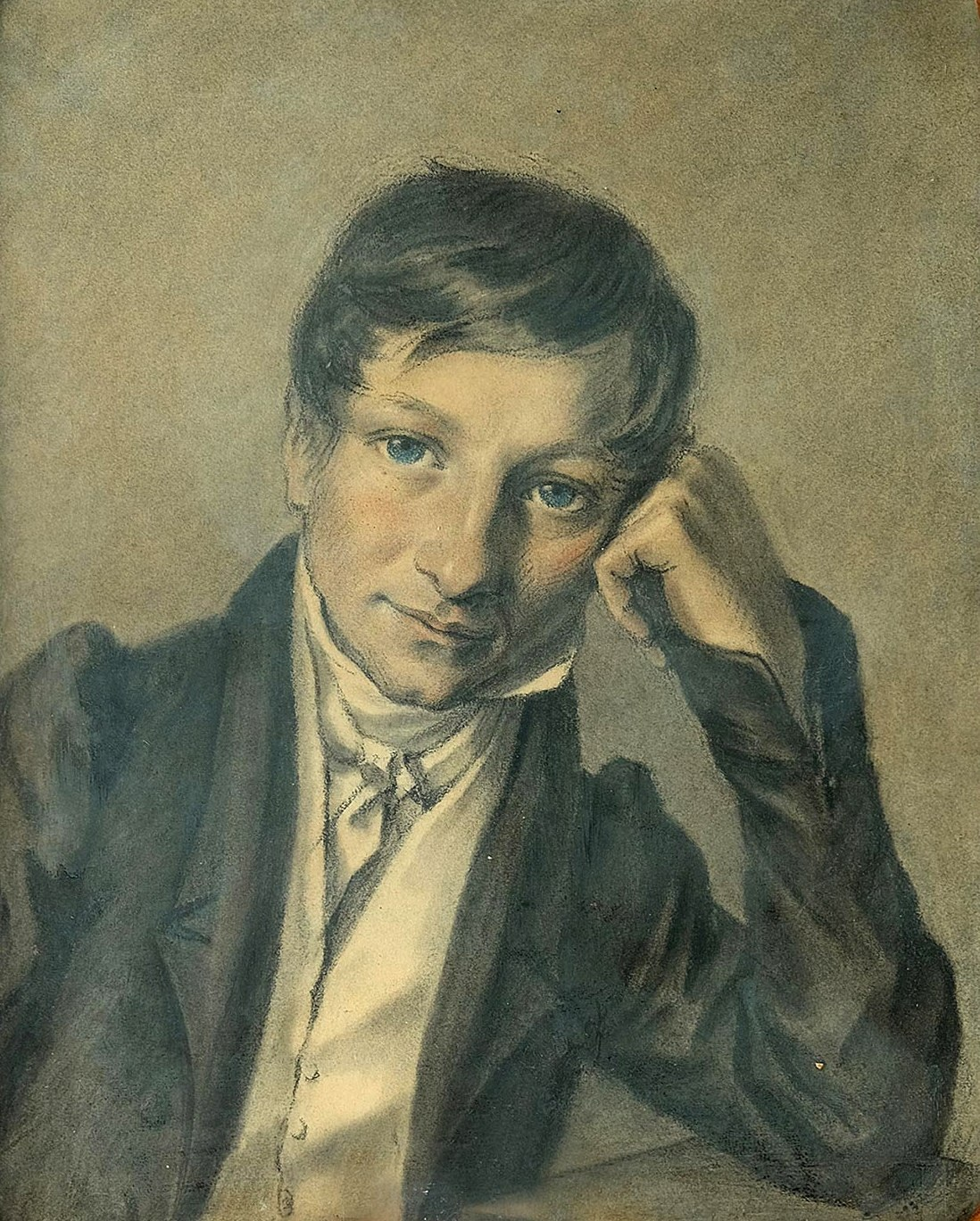
Franciszek Hieronim Malewski

Franciszek Hieronim Malewski of Jastrzębiec coat of arms (1800-1870) was a Polish lawyer, archivist and journalist. In 1815 he graduated from the Wilno-based gimnazjum wileńskie and started legal studies at the local university. Founding member of the Filomatic Society and friend to Adam Mickiewicz, he was also a co-founder of the Filaretic Society. Arrested in 1823 for membership in aforementioned societies, the following year he was sentenced to forced resettlement to Russia by tsarist authorities.

In 1829 he was allowed to settle in St. Petersburg, where he started working at the Lithuanian Metrica Office. Around that time he also founded the Tygodnik Petersburski (Petersburg weekly), the first Polish-language newspaper to be published in that city. In 1832 he married Helena née Szymanowska (daughter to Maria Szymanowska and sister to Celina née Szymanowska, future wife of Adam Mickiewicz). Among his children was Maria Malewska who would later become wife of Władysław Mickiewicz, poet's son. He died on 10 April 1870.

== Sources ==
- Czesław Malewski. "Rody i herby szlacheckie na Litwie (XX); Herb Jastrzębiec". Nasz Czas (in Polish). 18 (577): 23. Archived from the original on 2008-01-24.
