= Tomasz Zan =

Polish poet and activist (1796–1855)

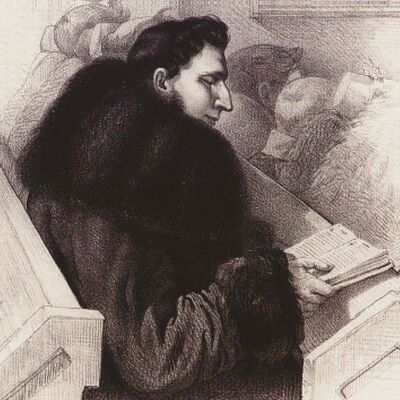
Tomasz Zan, in a drawing by R. Żukowski (1825–1855)

Tomasz Zan (Belarusian: Тамаш Зан; 21 December 1796 – 19 July 1855) was a Polish poet and activist. Zan played a significant role in the cultural and literary movements of his time, advocating for the preservation and promotion of Polish culture. Zan's poetry touched upon various themes, including patriotism, nature, and the human experience. He is often recognized as one of the pioneers of Belarusian literature.

== Biography ==
He was born on 21 December 1796 in Miasata, Vileysky Uyezd, in the Minsk Governorate of the Russian Empire (present-day Maladzyechna District of Belarus).

Zan attended the Vilnius University from 1820-1823, where he befriended Adam Mickiewicz, who would later become Poland's best-known poet. As Zan was two years older, he served as a mentor and friend to Mickiewicz.

In 1817 he was a cofounder of the Philomatic Association (Towarzystwo Filomatów), in 1820, Radiant Association (Towarzystwo Promienistych), in 1820-1823 president of Filaret Association (Zgromadzenie Filaretów), all of them student organizations in Vilnius dedicated to Polish cultural and political activities. For his activity in those organizations he was exiled by the Russian authorities to Siberia (from 1824 to 1837), during which time he assisted Alexander von Humboldt on his 1829 research expedition.

Between 1837 and 1841 he worked as a librarian in Saint Petersburg before returning to Vilnius.

He died on 19 July 1855 in Kakoŭčyna, Orsha, then part of the Russian Empire and is buried in the village of Smalyany (present-day Orsha District of Belarus).

Zan was the grandfather of the Polish poet Kazimiera Iłłakowiczówna.

== Legacy ==
His poetry is mostly satirical, most known is the heroicomic 'Zgon tabakiery'.
