= Biblioteka Dlya Chteniya =

Russian monthly magazine

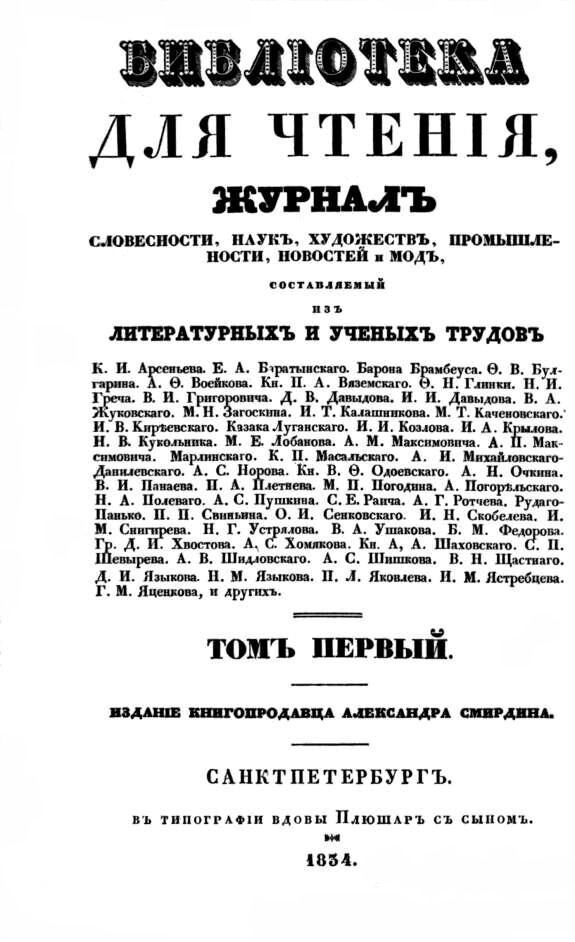
- 1834 title page
- Frequency: Monthly
- Founded: 1834
- Final issue: 1865
- Based in: Saint Petersburg, Russian Empire
- Language: Russian

Biblioteka Dlya Chteniya (Russian: Библиоте́ка для чте́ния, English: The Library for Reading) was a Russian monthly magazine founded in Saint Petersburg, Russian Empire, in 1834 by Alexander Smirdin.

== History ==
The magazine "of literature, sciences, arts, industry, current news and fashion" was launched in 1834 by publisher and trader Alexander Filippovich Smirdin who invited the professor of Saint Petersburg University Osip Senkovsky to edit it, for the unusually high salary of 15 thousand rubles a year. For the first time in the history of Russian journalism Smirdin maintained the distinction between the publisher and editor and established a fixed royalties schedule (200 rubles per list a minimum, 1000 rubles for famous authors). Biblioteka Dlya Chteniya became the first ever best-selling magazine in Russia to appeal to the wide middle-class readership, not just the intellectual elite.

The magazine had several regular sections: Russian Literature, Foreign Literature, Science and Arts, Industry and Agriculture, Criticism, History of Literature and Miscellaneous. Each issue featured the illustrated report on latest fashions. After its second year the magazine had 5 thousand subscribers, two years later - 7 thousand. The subscription price was modest, 50 rubles per year.

The 1830s were the golden age of Biblioteka Dlya Chteniya which in its first two years published works by Alexander Pushkin. In the 1840s Andrey Krayevsky's Otechestvennye Zapiski became a strong rival. This, as well as the social changes in Russia contributed to BDC's decline. By 1847, when the subscription figures dropped to 3 thousand, Smirdin has already gone bankrupt. A year later the magazine was acquired by the book trader V.P.Pechatkin who invited Albert Starchevsky as a co-editor. In 1856 Alexander Druzhinin became its editor, to be joined by Alexei Pisemsky. As Druzhinin retired due to poor health, Pisemsky in November 1860 became BDC's editor-in-chief. He left the magazine in 1863 to be succeeded by Pyotr Boborykin and Nikolai Voskoboynikov. Biblioteka Dlya Chteniya's final issue came out in April 1865.
