= List of gothic fiction works =

List of gothic literary works

Gothic fiction (sometimes referred to as Gothic horror or Gothic romanticism) is a genre of literature that combines elements of both horror fiction and romanticism.

== List of Books ==
=== A ===
- Joan Aiken, Castle Barebane (1976)
- John Aikin and Anna Laetitia Barbauld, Sir Bertrand, a Fragment (1773)
- Sophie Albrecht, Das höfliche Gespenst (1797) and Graumännchen oder die Burg Rabenbühl: eine Geistergeschichte altteutschen Ursprungs (1799)
- Louisa May Alcott, A Long Fatal Love Chase (1866)
- Alexander Amfiteatrov, Kymeriyskaya Bolezn (1910)
- V. C. Andrews, Flowers in the Attic (1979)
- Leonid Andreyev, The Grand Slam (1899) and On (Rasskaz neizvestnogo) (1913)
- Johann August Apel and Friedrich Laun, Gespensterbuch (1810–1817)
- Aleksey Nikolayevich Apukhtin, Between Life and Death (1895)
- Margaret Atwood, Lady Oracle (1976)
- Jane Austen, Northanger Abbey (1818)
- Pupi Avati, L’orto americano (2023)
- Álvares de Azevedo, Noite na Taverna (1855)

=== B ===
- François-Thomas-Marie de Baculard d'Arnaud, Euphémie, ou le Triomphe de la religion (1768)
- Yevgeny Baratynsky, The Ring (1832)
- Clive Barker, The Hellbound Heart (1986)
- Eaton Stannard Barrett, The Heroine (1813)
- Konstantin Nikolayevich Batyushkov, Apparition (1810)
- Charles Beaumont, The Vanishing American (1955)
- William Thomas Beckford, Vathek (1786)
- Gustavo Adolfo Bécquer, El Monte de las Ánimas (1861)
- Aloysius Bertrand, Gaspard de la nuit (1842)
- Alexander Bestuzhev, Eisen Castle (1827), An Evening at a Caucasian Spa in 1824 (1830), The Cuirassier (1831) and The Terrible Fortune-Telling (1831)
- Ambrose Bierce, The Spook House (1889) and The Death of Halpin Frayser (1891)
- Anna Biller, Bluebeard's Castle (2023)
- Anastasia Blackwell, The House on Black Lake (2010)
- Algernon Blackwood, The Willows (1907)
- Robert Bloch, Black Bargain (1942) and Psycho (1959)
- Petrus Borel, Champavert (1833)
- Marjorie Bowen, Black Magic: a Tale of the Rise and Fall of the Antichrist (1909)
- Ray Bradbury, The Fog Horn (1951)
- Ivo Brešan, Cathedral (2007)
- Poppy Z. Brite, Lost Souls (1992) and Exquisite Corpse (1996)
- Charlotte Brontë, Jane Eyre (1847) and Villette (1850)
- Emily Brontë, Wuthering Heights (1847)
- Charles Brockden Brown, Wieland (1798), Ormond; or, the Secret Witness (1799), Edgar Huntly; or, Memoirs of a Sleep-Walker (1799) and Arthur Mervyn; or, Memoirs of the Year 1793 (1799)
- Valery Bryusov, In the Mirror (1902) and The Fiery Angel (1908)
- Mikhaíl Afanasyevich Bulgakov, The Red Crown (1922) and A Séance (1922)
- Edward Bulwer-Lytton, Night and Morning (1841)
- Ivan Alekseyevich Bunin, Dry Valley (1912)
- Gottfried August Bürger, Lenore (1773)
- Frances Burney, The Wanderer (1814)
- William Butler, The House of Balestrom (2011)
- Lord Byron, The Giaour (1813) and Fragment of a Novel (1819)

=== C ===
- Truman Capote, Other Voices, Other Rooms (1948)
- Luigi Capuana, Spiritismo? (1884), "Il dottor Cymbalus", "Un vampiro" and other stories (1867–1904)
- Emilio Carrere, The Tower of the Seven Hunchbacks (1920)
- Angela Carter, The Bloody Chamber (1974)
- Mrs Carver, The Horrors of Oakendale Abbey (1797)
- Abelardo Castillo, La casa de ceniza (1967)
- Jacques Cazotte, The Devil in Love (1772)
- Robert W. Chambers, The King in Yellow/Yellow Sign (1895)
- Alexander Vasilyevich Chayanov, The Tale of the Hairdresser's Mannequin (1918), Venediktov (1921) and The Venetian Mirror (1923)
- Anton Pavlovich Chekhov, Ward No. 6 (1892) and The Black Monk (1894)
- Georgy Ivanovich Chulkov, Golos iz mogily (1921)
- Marcus Clarke, For the Term of his Natural Life (1874)
- Samuel Taylor Coleridge, Lyrical Ballads (1798) and Christabel (1816)
- Robert Cormier, The Chocolate War (1974)
- Marie Corelli, Barabbas, A Dream of the World's Tragedy (1893)

=== D ===
- Charlotte Dacre, Zofloya (1806)
- Mark Z. Danielewski, House of Leaves (2000)
- Grigory Danilevsky, Mertvec-ubiytsa (1879)
- Robertson Davies, The Deptford Trilogy (1970–1975)
- Stéphanie Félicité, comtesse de Genlis, The True and Affecting History of the Duchess of C****, Who was Confined by Her Husband in a Dismal Dungeon (1799)
- Carl Grosse, Der Genius (1796) (also translated by Peter Will in an abridged version as Horrid Mysteries)
- Walter de la Mare, The Return (1910)
- Friedrich de la Motte Fouqué, Undine (1811)
- Comte de Lautréamont, Les Chants de Maldoror (1869)
- Guy de Maupassant, The Horla (1887)
- Isabelle de Montolieu, Melissa and Marcia: or, the Sisters (1788), Louisa: or, the Reward of an Affectionate Daughter (1790), The History of Ned Evans (1796), The Church of Saint Siffrid (1797) and The Mourtray Family (1800)
- Gérard de Nerval, Les Filles du feu (1854) and Aurélia ou le Rêve et la Vie (1855)
- Thomas de Quincey, Confessions of an English Opium-Eater (1821)
- Marquis de Sade, Justine (1791)
- August Derleth, The Lonesome Place (1948)
- Charles Dickens, Oliver Twist (1838), A Christmas Carol (1843), Bleak House (1854), Great Expectations (1861) and The Mystery of Edwin Drood (1870)
- Thomas M. Disch, The Priest: A Gothic Romance (1994)
- Fyodor Mikhailovich Dostoyevsky, The Double (1846), The Landlady (1847), Bobok (1873) and The Brothers Karamazov (1880)
- Arthur Conan Doyle, Lot No. 249 (1892), Rodney Stone (1896) and The Hound of the Baskervilles (1901–1902)
- Daphne du Maurier, Jamaica Inn (1936), Rebecca (1938) and My Cousin Rachel (1951)
- George du Maurier, Trilby (1894)
- François Guillaume Ducray-Duminil, Coelina, or The Child Of Mystery (1799)
- Alexandre Dumas, The Pale Lady (1849) and The Wolf Leader (1857)
- Nadezhda Andreyevna Durova, The Pavilion (1839)

=== E ===
- Dorothy Eden, The Shadow Wife (1968)
- Hanns Heinz Ewers, The Sorcerer's Apprentice (1910), Alraune (1911), Vampire (1921) and Der Geisterseher (1922)
- Jean-Baptiste Benoît Eyriès, Fantasmagoriana (1812)

=== F ===
- Ángel Faretta, Tempestad y asalto (2009)
- Henry Farrell, What Ever Happened to Baby Jane (1960)
- J. G. Farrell, Troubles (1970)
- William Faulkner, The Sound and the Fury (1929)
- Paul Féval, père, Le Chevalier Ténèbre (1860), La Vampire (1865) and La Ville Vampire (1874)
- Timothy Findley, Not Wanted on the Voyage (1984)
- Richard Flanagan, Gould's Book of Fish (2001)
- Antonio Fogazzaro, Malombra (1881)

=== G ===
- Neil Gaiman, The Graveyard Book (2008)
- Elena Gan, Society's Judgement (1840)
- Vsevolod Mikhailovich Garshin, The Red Flower (1883)
- Elizabeth Gaskell, The Doom of the Griffiths (1858), The Grey Woman and Lois the Witch
- Theophile Gautier, The Mummy's Foot (1863)
- Charlotte Perkins Gilman, The Yellow Wallpaper (1892)
- Zinaida Nikolaevna Gippius, Vymysel (Vecherniy rassskaz) (1906)
- Milovan Glišić, After Ninety Years (1880)
- Nikolay Gnedich, Don Corrado de Gerrera (1803)
- William Godwin, The Adventures of Caleb Williams (1794) and St. Leon: A Tale of the 16th Century (1799)
- Nikolai Vasilievich Gogol, "St. John's Eve", "May Night, or the Drowned Maiden" and "A Terrible Vengeance" from Evenings on a Farm Near Dikanka (1831), "Viy" from Mirgorod (1835), "The Portrait" from Arabesques (1835) and "The Nose" (1835–6)
- Witold Gombrowicz, Possessed (1939)
- Jeremias Gotthelf, The Black Spider (1842)
- Barbara Gowdy, Mister Sandman (1995)
- Julien Gracq, The Castle of Argol (1938)
- Nikolay Ivanovich Gretsch, Black Woman (1834)
- Alexander Grin, Krysolov (1924) and The Grey Motor Car (1925)
- Davis Grubb, The Night of the Hunter (1953)
- Francesco Domenico Guerrazzi, Beatrice Cenci (1854)

=== H ===
- Nathaniel Hawthorne, Young Goodman Brown (1835), The Minister's Black Veil (1836), Edward Randolph's Portrait (1838) and The House of the Seven Gables (1851), Rappacini's Daughter (1844)
- Susan Hill, The Woman in Black (1983)
- E.T.A. Hoffmann, The Devil's Elixir (1815), The Entail (1817) and Gambler's Luck (1819)
- James Hogg, The Private Memoirs and Confessions of a Justified Sinner (1824)
- William Hope Hodgson, The House on the Borderland (1907)
- Victoria Holt, Mistress of Mellyn (1960) and Kirkland Revels (1962)
- Robert E. Howard, Pigeons from Hell (1934)
- Victor Hugo, The Hunchback of Notre-Dame (1831)
- Evan Hunter, Last Summer (1968)
- Joris-Karl Huysmans, À rebours (1884) and (Là-bas (1891)

=== I ===
- Thomas Ingoldsby, The Ingoldsby Legends (1840)
- Washington Irving, The Adventure of the German Student (1824) and "The Legend of Sleepy Hollow" (1821)
- Junji Ito, Uzumaki (2002)
- Alexander Pavlovich Ivanov, Stereoskop (1909)
- Alexei Ivanov, Psoglavtsy (2011)
- Vsevolod Vyacheslavovich Ivanov, Agasfer (released in 1968)

=== J ===
- Shirley Jackson, The Lovely House (1950), The Lottery (1951), The Haunting of Hill House (1959) and We Have Always Lived in the Castle (1962)
- W.W. Jacobs, The Monkey's Paw (1902)
- Henry James, The Turn of the Screw (1898) and The Real Right Thing (1899)
- M. R. James, Ghost Stories of an Antiquary (1904), More Ghost Stories of an Antiquary (1911), A Thin Ghost and Others (1919) and A Warning to the Curious and Other Ghost Stories (1925)
- Elfriede Jelinek, Die Kinder der Toten (1995)
- Rikard Jorgovanić, Love upon the Catafalque (1876), Dada (1878) and A Wife and a Lover (1878)

=== K ===
- Karl Friedrich Kahlert's The Necromancer (1794)
- Aino Kallas, The Wolf's Bride: A Tale from Estonia (1928)
- Nikolay Karamzin, Poor Liza (1792) and Island of Bornholm (1793)
- Uladzimir Karatkievich, Savage Hunt of King Stakh (1964)
- Pavel Katenin, Olga (1816)
- John Keats, La Belle Dame sans Merci (1819) and Isabella, or the Pot of Basil (1820)
- Raymond Kennedy's Lulu Incognito (1988)
- Caitlin Kiernan, Silk (1998)
- Russell Kirk, The Princess of All Lands (1979), Old House of Fear (1961), and Lord of the Hollow Dark (1979)
- Stephen King, 'Salem's Lot (1975) and The Shining (1977)
- Stephen King and Ridley Pearson, The Diary of Ellen Rimbauer (2002)
- Ivan Vasilyevich Kireyevsky, Opal (1834)
- T.E.D. Klein, The Events at Poroth Farm (1972)
- Alexander Alexeyevich Kondratyev, Satiressa (1907) and Na nevedomom ostrove (1910)
- Vladimir Galaktionovich Korolenko, Judgement Day (Yom Kippur) (1889)
- Nikolai Kostomarov, Bol'naja (Rasskaz vracha) (1880)
- Elizabeth Kostova, The Historian (2005)
- Sigizmund Dominikovich Krzhizhanovsky, The Phantom (released in 1991)
- Aleksandr Kuprin, Silver Volf (1901)
- Dawn Kurtagich, The Dead House (2015), And the Trees Crept In (2016), and Teeth in the Mist (2019)

=== L ===
- Lady Caroline Lamb, Glenarvon (1816)
- Francis Lathom, The Castle of Ollada (1795) and The Midnight Bell (1798)
- Sheridan Le Fanu, Uncle Silas (1864), In a Glass Darkly (1872), and Carmilla (1871)
- Harper Lee, To Kill a Mockingbird (1960)
- Dennis Lehane, Shutter Island (2003)
- Fritz Leiber, The Girl with the Hungry Eyes (1949)
- Julia Leigh, The Hunter (1999)
- Mikhail Yuryevich Lermontov, Vadim (1832), Demon (1838) and "Bela" and "Tamanj" in A Hero of Our Time (1840) and Stuss (1845)
- Gaston Leroux, The Phantom of the Opera (1910)
- Nikolai Semyonovich Leskov, The White Eagle (A Ghost Story) (1880)
- Ira Levin, Rosemary's Baby (1967) and The Stepford Wives (1972)
- Matthew Gregory Lewis, The Monk (1796) and The Castle Spectre (1797)
- Thomas Ligotti, Vastarien (1987)
- George Lippard, The Quaker City, or The Monks of Monk Hall (1845)
- Frank Belknap Long, So Dark a Heritage (1966)
- Jane Loudon, The Mummy! (1827)
- H. P. Lovecraft, The Outsider (1921), The Rats in the Walls (1923), The Case of Charles Dexter Ward (1927)
- Anatoly Vasilyevich Lunacharsky, The Bear Wedding (1923)

=== M ===
- Arthur Machen, The Great God Pan (1890)
- Grigori Alexandrovich Machtet, Zaklyatiy kazak (1876)
- Florence Marryat, The Blood of the Vampire (1897)
- Frederick Marryat, The Phantom Ship (1839)
- Richard Marsh, The Beetle: A Mystery (1897)
- Richard Matheson, Long Distance Call (1953), I am Legend (1954) and A Stir of Echoes (1958)
- Antun Gustav Matoš, U čudnim gostima (1898), Miš (1899) and Camao (1900)
- Charles Maturin, Melmoth the Wanderer (1820)
- Michael McDowell, The Elementals (1981)
- Patrick McGrath, The Grotesque (1989)
- John Meaney, Bone Song (2007)
- Wilhelm Meinhold, The Amber Witch (1838) and Sidonia von Bork (1847)
- Prosper Mérimée, La Vénus d'Ille (1837) and Lokis (1869)
- Barbara Michaels, Ammie Come Home (1968)
- John Moore, Zeluco (1789)
- Toni Morrison, Beloved (1987)
- Manuel Mujica Lainez, Bomarzo (1962)
- Alice Munro, Selected Stories (1996)

=== N ===
- Vasily Narezhny, Mertviy Zamok (1801)
- Momčilo Nastasijević, Rodoslov loze vampira
- Benedikte Naubert, Hermann of Unna (1788)
- Vasily Ivanovich Nemirovich-Danchenko, Zasypanniy kolodec (1911)
- Vítězslav Nezval, Valerie and Her Week of Wonders (1945)

=== O ===
- Peter O'Donnell, Moonraker's Bride (1973)
- Joyce Carol Oates, Bellefleur (1980), Night-Side (1980), A Bloodsmoor Romance (1982), Mysteries of Winterthurn (1983) and My Heart Laid Bare (1998)
- Fitz-James O'Brien, What Was It? (1859)
- Flannery O'Connor, Wise Blood (1952), The Violent Bear It Away (1960)
- Vladimir Odoevsky, The Sylph (1837), The Ghost (1838), The City Without a Name (1839), 4338 A.D. (1840), The Cosmorama (1840), Russian Nights (1844) and The Living Corpse (1844)
- Margaret Oliphant, A Beleaguered City (1880)
- Valeryan Nikolayevich Olin, Rasskazy na stanciy (1838–9)
- Lauren Owen, The Quick (2014)

=== P ===
- John Palmer Jr., The Mystery of the Black Tower (1796)
- Gilbert Parker, The Lane that Had No Turning, and Other Tales Concerning the People of Pontiac (1900)
- Eliza Parsons, The Castle of Wolfenbach (1793) and The Mysterious Warning (1796)
- Thomas Love Peacock, Nightmare Abbey (1818)
- Mervyn Peake, Gormenghast trilogy (1946–1955)
- Pyotr Pletnyov, The Gravedigger (1820)
- Edgar Allan Poe, Berenice (1835), Ligeia (1838), The Fall of the House of Usher (1839), The Narrative of Arthur Gordon Pym of Nantucket (1839), The Masque of the Red Death (1842), The Oval Portrait (1842), The Pit and the Pendulum (1842), The Black Cat (1843) and The Tell-Tale Heart (1843)
- Antony Pogorelsky, The Lafertovo Poppy-Cake Seller (1825) and Monastyrka (1830–31)
- Nikolai Polevoy, The Voices from the Other World (1829) and The Bliss of Madness (1833)
- John William Polidori, The Vampyre (1819)
- Jan Potocki, The Manuscript Found in Saragossa (1805)
- W.H. Pugmire, Tales of Sesqua Valles (1997)
- Alexander Pushkin, The Bridegroom (1827), The Undertaker (1831) and The Queen of Spades (1834)

=== R ===
- Ann Radcliffe, A Sicilian Romance (1790), The Romance of the Forest (1791), The Mysteries of Udolpho (1794), The Castles of Athlin and Dunbayne and The Italian (1797)
- Jean Ray, Malpertuis (1943)
- Clara Reeve, The Old English Baron (1778)
- Aleksey Mikhailovich Remizov, The Sacrifice (1909) and Sisters of the Cross (1910)
- Władysław Stanisław Reymont, The Vampire (1911)
- G.W.M. Reynolds, Faust (1846), Wagner the Wehr-wolf (1847) and The Necromancer (1857)
- Anne Rice, Interview with the Vampire (1976)
- Regina Maria Roche, Clermont (1798) and The Children of the Abbey (1800)
- W. E. D. Ross, Dark Shadows by Marilyn Ross (1966–1972)
- Yevdokia Petrovna Rostopchina, Poedinok (1838)
- James Malcolm Rymer, Varney the Vampire (1847)
- Ryukishi07, Umineko: When They Cry (2007 - 2010)

=== S ===
- Ernesto Sabato, On Heroes and Tombs (1961)
- Evgeny Salias De Tournemire, On zhe
- Friedrich Schiller, The Ghost-Seer (1787–9)
- Walter Scott, The Monastery (1820)
- Marcus Sedgwick, "My Swordhand is Singing" (2006)
- Osip Senkovsky, Antar (1833)
- Anya Seton, Dragonwyck (1945)
- Diane Setterfield, The Thirteenth Tale (2006)
- Mary Shelley, Frankenstein (1818)
- Percy Bysshe Shelley, Zastrozzi (1810) and St. Irvyne; or, The Rosicrucian (1811)
- Anne Rivers Siddons, The House Next Door (1976)
- Eleanor Sleath, The Orphan of the Rhine (1798)
- Clark Ashton Smith, The Vaults of Yoh-Vombis (1932)
- Orest Somov, Tales of Buried Treasure (1829), The Werewolf (1829) and Kiev Witches (1833)
- Christian Heinrich Spiess, Das Petermännchen (1793), Der alte Überall und Nirgends (1792), Die Löwenritter (1794) and Hans Heiling, vierter und letzter Regent der Erd- Luft- Feuer- und Wasser-Geister (1798)
- Robert Louis Stevenson, Strange Case of Dr Jekyll and Mr Hyde (1886)
- Mary Stewart, Nine Coaches Waiting (1958)
- Robert Lawrence Stine, Goosebumps (1992)
- Bram Stoker, Dracula (1897) and The Lair of the White Worm (1911)
- Theodor Storm, The Rider on the White Horse (1888)
- Oleksa Storozhenko, The Devil in Love (1861)
- Peter Straub's Julia (1975)

=== T ===
- Rabindranath Tagore, The Lost Jewels
- Donna Tartt, The Secret History (1992) and The Little Friend (2002)
- G.P. Taylor, Shadowmancer (2004)
- Ludwig Tieck, Der blonde Eckbert (1797) and Der Runenberg (1804)
- Vladimir Pavlovich Titov and Alexander Sergeyevich Pushkin, The Remote House on Vasilyevsky Street (1828)
- Yana Toboso, Kuroshitsuji (2006)
- Count Aleksey Konstantinovich Tolstoy, The Family of the Vourdalak (1839) and The Vampire (Upyr') (1841)
- Aleksey Nikolayevich Tolstoy, Graf Kaliostro (1921)
- Zacharias Topelius, Linnaisten kartanon viheriä kamari (1859)
- Danielle Trussoni, The Ancestor (2020)
- Ivan Sergeyevich Turgenev, Faust (1856), Phantoms (1864), The Song of Triumphant Love (1881) and Clara Milich (1883)

=== U ===
- Miloš Urban, The Seven Churches (1999) and Lord Mord (2008)
- Sarah Elizabeth Utterson, Tales of the Dead (1813)

=== V ===
- Alexander Fomich Veltman, Yolanda (1837) and Heart and Thought (1838)
- Giovanni Verga, Le storie del castello di Trezza (1877)
- Ursula Vernon, What Moves the Dead (2022)
- Ludwig Achim von Arnim, Die Majoratsherren (1819)
- Adelbert von Chamisso, Peter Schlemihls wundersame Geschichte (1814)
- Joseph Freiherr von Eichendorff, The Marble Statue (1819)
- Heinrich von Kleist, The Beggarwoman of Locrano (1810) and The Foundling (1811)
- Leopold von Sacher-Masoch¨s Die Seelenfängerin (1886)
- Christian August Vulpius' The History of Rinaldo Rinaldini (1798)

=== W ===
- Karl Edward Wagner, Endless Night (1987)
- Horace Walpole, The Castle of Otranto (1764)
- Hugh Walpole, Portrait of a Man with Red Hair (1925) and The Killer and the Slain (1942)
- Sarah Waters, The Little Stranger (2009)
- Eudora Welty, A Curtain of Green (1941)
- Edith Wharton, Afterward (1910)
- Walt Whitman, Franklin Evans (1842)
- Phyllis A. Whitney, Lost Island (1970)
- Oscar Wilde, The Picture of Dorian Gray (1891), Salome (1894)
- F. Paul Wilson, The Keep (1981)

=== Z ===
- Carlos Ruiz Zafon, The Shadow of the Wind (2001)
- Marija Jurić Zagorka, The Witch of Grič (1912–1914) and The Flaming Inquisitors (1928–9)
- Mikhail Zagoskin, Unexpected Guests (1834)
- Yevgeny Ivanovich Zamyatin, The Fisher of Men (1921)
- Andrei Yefimovich Zarin, Black Lady (1895) and Satan's Gift (1904)
- Maria Semyonovna Zhukova, A Summer Place on the Peterhof Road (1845)
- Vasily Andreyevich Zhukovsky, Ludmila (1808) and Svetlana (1813)
- Michelle Zink, The Prophecy of the Sisters (2009)
- Heinrich Zschokke, Abällino, der grosse Bandit (1793)

=== Anonymous ===
- The Cavern of Death (1794)
- The Nightwatches of Bonaventura (1804)
