= Stereotypes of Jews in literature =

Stereotypes of Jews in literature have evolved over the centuries. According to Louis Harap, nearly all European writers prior to the twentieth century projected the Jewish stereotypes in their works. Harap cites Gotthold Lessing's Nathan the Wise (1779) as the first time that Jews were portrayed in the arts as "human beings, with human possibilities and characteristics." Harap writes that, the persistence of the Jewish stereotype over the centuries suggests to some that "the treatment of the Jew in literature was completely static and was essentially unaffected by the changes in the Jewish situation in society as that society itself changed." He contrasts the opposing views presented in the two most comprehensive studies of the Jew in English literature, one by Montagu Frank Modder and the other by Edgar Rosenberg. Modder asserts that writers invariably "reflect the attitude of contemporary society in their presentation of the Jewish character, and that the portrayal changes with the economic and social changes of each decade." In opposition to Modder's "historical rationale", Rosenberg warns that such a perspective "is apt to slight the massive durability of a stereotype". Harap suggests that the recurrence of the Jewish stereotype in literature is itself one indicator of the continued presence of antisemitism among the readers of that literature.

== English literature ==
Edgar Rosenberg, American film and television producer, has characterized 'the image of the Jew in English literature' as having been "a depressingly uniform and static phenomenon". For example, although Jews were expelled from England in 1290, stereotypes were so ingrained and so durable that they persisted in English society as evidenced by presentations in English literature, drama, and the visual arts during the almost four-hundred-year period when there were virtually no Jews present in the British Isles. Dik Van Arkel notes that "Chaucer, Marlowe and Shakespeare had no direct knowledge of Jews."

=== The Canterbury Tales ===
In The Canterbury Tales, the Prioress tells a story of a devout Christian child who was murdered by Jews affronted at his singing a hymn as he passed through the Jewry, or Jewish quarter, of a city in Asia. Much later criticism focuses on the tale's antisemitism. Allen Koretsky asserts that, because the antisemitism in this tale runs counter to the generally positive image of Chaucer, it has been "ignored, excused, explained or palliated in a number of ways." Thus, a considerable body of critical and scholarly opinion holds that this speech, in the mouth of the Prioress, represents an ironic inversion of Chaucer's own sentiments; that is, the Prioress is seen as a hypocrite whose cruelty and bigotry belies her conventionally pious pose—a situation typical of the indeterminacy of Chaucer's intentions.

=== Elizabethan era ===
The character of Barabas in Christopher Marlowe's play The Jew of Malta is possibly the first ever stage-portrayal of a psychopath (at least within English literature). Barabas is portrayed taking people into confidence by playing on their desires and then killing them. Like Shakespeare's Shylock—the idea of whom may have been inspired by Barabas—he is open to interpretation as a symbol of antisemitism. However, also like Shylock, he occasionally shows evidence of humanity (albeit very rarely).

It has been suggested that The Jew of Malta influenced Shakespeare's play, The Merchant of Venice. Despite the fact that Shakespeare probably never met a Jew, The Merchant of Venice includes a character named Shylock who has become the archetype of the Jewish moneylender stereotype. Derek Cohen asserts that the Shylock character is "the best known Jew in English."

Shylock is a money-lender and was often portrayed with a hooked nose and bright red wigs. Shylock's character has been criticized for its antisemitic nature, although some interpretations of the play consider him a sympathetic figure.

=== Victorian era ===
When Jews are found in Victorian fiction, they are almost always portrayed as a stereotype rather than as human beings. Literary depictions commonly drew upon long-established antisemitic tropes, presenting Jewish characters as greedy financiers, unscrupulous outsiders, or criminal figures. Such portrayals were influenced by widespread social prejudice and cultural marginalization of Jews in 19th-century Britain, where legal emancipation had not eliminated public suspicion and xenophobic attitudes.

One of the most widely cited examples of the "villain Jew" stereotype appears in the character of Fagin in Charles Dickens's novel Oliver Twist (1838). Fagin is repeatedly described as morally corrupt, avaricious, and physically grotesque. In the first thirty-eight chapters of the novel, Dickens refers to him as "the Jew" more than 250 times, in contrast to only 42 uses of his proper name. Dickens later stated that his choice to identify Fagin's religion so persistently was based on his belief that, during the period depicted, such criminals were frequently Jewish. However, this explanation did not address the effect of the repeated ethnic labeling, which many critics have viewed as reinforcing antisemitic stereotypes.

Fagin’s characterization combines his role as a manipulator of children, a miser, and a grotesque figure, presenting a composite image that critics have described as one of the most influential Jewish caricatures in modern English literature. In later years, Dickens responded to public criticism by removing over 180 references to Fagin as "the Jew" in revised editions published during his lifetime.

While Dickens's later correspondence and revisions suggest an awareness of the harm caused by the portrayal, the original depiction of Fagin had already contributed significantly to the literary codification of antisemitic imagery. The figure of the villainous Jew remained common in 19th-century British literature. Though a few later authors, such as George Eliot in Daniel Deronda (1876), attempted more sympathetic portrayals of Jewish characters, these remained exceptional within the broader landscape of Victorian fiction. Some authors of this period seem to have attempted to counterbalance the negative portrayals of Jews in their earlier works with more positive images in later works. For example, in his later 1864-1865 novel Our Mutual Friend, Dickens himself presents the Jewish character Riah as a paragon of virtue. By this time, Dickens even claimed that Fagin's Jewishness was incidental to the conception of the character and this claim has been treated seriously by many literary critics. In opposition to this view, Cohen and Heller assert that Fagin's Jewishness is stressed frequently in Oliver Twist and that Dickens often refers to him as "the Jew" and that Fagin's character and physical features draw on the "long history of antisemitic associations and stereotypes to provide added resonance to Fagin's particular villainies".

George du Maurier depicts Svengali as a Jewish rogue, masterful musician, and hypnotist. The character has been portrayed in many film and television versions of the story. The word "svengali" has entered the language meaning a person who with evil intent manipulates another into doing what is desired. It is frequently used for any kind of coach who seems to exercise an extreme degree of domination over a performer (especially if the person is a young woman and the coach is an older man).

One notable exception is the character of Anton Trendelssohn, whom Anthony Trollope portrays in his novel Nina Balatka as a more deep character rather than as a Jewish stereotype.

George Eliot's novel Daniel Deronda (1876) is admired by many for having made an honest attempt to capture the essence of 19th century Judaism by presenting a sympathetic rendering of Jewish proto-Zionist and Kaballistic ideas,

=== 20th century ===
In 20th-century Britain, stereotypes about Jews were both pervasive and damaging, influencing literature, politics, and societal attitudes. These stereotypes often centered around a few recurring themes, such as financial control, social exclusivity, and untrustworthiness, which were not only present in public discourse but also embedded in British literature.

Literature Representations

In British literature, Jewish characters often appeared as caricatures rather than fully realized individuals. For example, T.S. Eliot's works contain numerous references to Jewish characters with negative connotations. In his poem "Burbank with a Baedeker: Bleistein with a Cigar," Eliot employs antisemitic imagery and references, depicting Jews as materialistic and cosmopolitan interlopers. Similarly, in "Gerontion," he mentions a "small house agent's clerk" who is seen as a figure of decay and degeneration, an image that feeds into antisemitic stereotypes of the time. Negative stereotypes of Jews were still employed by prominent twentieth-century non-Jewish writers as well, such as Dorothy Richardson, Virginia Woolf, Evelyn Waugh, and Graham Greene.

Evelyn Waugh and Graham Greene also included problematic portrayals in their works. Waugh's portrayal of Jews in novels like Vile Bodies and A Handful of Dust often reinforced negative stereotypes, depicting Jewish characters as manipulative or greedy. Greene's literature occasionally touched on similar themes, subtly reinforcing the stereotype of Jews as schemers or morally ambiguous figures.

The protagonist in James Joyce's Ulysses, Leopold Bloom, is probably one of the most remarkable representations of Jews in Irish fiction. Bloom is the quintessential Everyman, and takes on the venerable role of Odysseus in Joyce's saga. Far from stereotypical, the depiction of his personality is one of the most detailed in literature.

Ezra Pound mentions Jewish attitudes towards money in his poem The Cantos, which focuses on the themes of economics and governance. In the poem, Jews are implicated in sinister manipulations of the money supply. Abraham Foxman asserts that The Cantos include a "vicious diatribe against interest-paying finance" and that those sections include antisemitic passages. In Canto 52, Pound wrote "Stinkschuld's [Rothschilds] sin drawing vengeance, poor yitts paying for / Stinkschuld [Rothschilds] / paying for a few big jews' vendetta on goyim", but the name Rothschilds was replaced by "Stinkschulds" at the insistence of Pound's publisher.

== American literature ==
Until the 20th century, the characterization of Jews in American literature was largely based upon the stereotypes employed in English literature. Although Jewish stereotypes first appeared in works by non-Jewish writers, after World War II it was often Jewish American writers themselves who evoked such fixed images. The prevalence of antisemitic stereotypes in the works of such authors has sometimes been interpreted an expression of self-hatred; however, Jewish American authors have also used these negative stereotypes to refute them.

=== 19th century ===
Antisemitic images are often found in nineteenth-century American literature. Some of the most notorious examples can be found in the writings of Nathaniel Hawthorne. In Hawthorne's novel The Marble Faun, Jews are described as "the ugliest, most evil-minded people" who resemble "maggots when they overpopulate a decaying cheese."

The earliest significant American poets were the Fireside Poets. These wrote from a Christian point of view and, with the exception of John Greenleaf Whittier, uniformly employed negative stereotypes of Jews.

In the latter half of the 19th century, Jews were often characterized as overly ambitious compared to African-Americans and Native Americans. Anti-Jewish stereotypes portrayed Jews as "aggressively smart and threateningly successful"; they were seen as a threat to American culture because of their "rapid social and economic mobility". However, despite their economic success, Jews were depicted as being unable to assimilate into American culture. One focus of media attention was the Lower East Side of Manhattan, an area where many European Jewish immigrants had settled. Newspaper accounts and photographs of the time depicted this urban slum as cluttered, disorderly, dirty and smelly; in brief, the living conditions of the Jews were considered to violate middle-class white standards of cleanliness and orderliness. Alicia Kent notes that, although the photographs of Jacob Riis were motivated by a desire to reform immigrant housing and employment conditions, they ironically helped to fix the public perception of Jews as "disorderly and uncontrollable."

Perhaps the only major work of 19th-century American literature that does not depict Jews according to the stereotypes of the day is Herman Melville's epic poem Clarel, which depicts the hardships faced by Jews living in Palestine as well as their customs. Departing from the usual treatment employed by other American writers of that era, Melville presents a range of Jewish characters that provide the reader a sense of Jews as human individuals rather than as cardboard cutouts.

=== 20th century ===
The presentation of economic and social stereotypes of Jews in American literature persisted into the first half of the 20th century. Jews were depicted as money-obsessed, vulgar, and pushy social climbers. Jewish men and women were represented in literature as dressing ostentatiously. Their physical characteristics followed the model that had been handed down over the centuries: Red hair and hooked noses were some of the prominent features employed. For example, in The American Scene, Henry James employs a number of antisemitic stereotypes to describe the skin color and nose shape of the Jewish residents. Characterization of Jews as an inferior race could be found in works such as Jack London's novel Martin Eden.

=== Jewish-American authors ===
According to Sanford V. Sternlicht, the first generation of Jewish-American authors presented "realistic portrayals – warts and all" of Jewish immigrants. He describes the literature of this generation as "almost devoid of Jewish self-hatred." Sternlicht contrasts this generation with some second or third-generation Jewish-American authors who deliberately "reinforced negative stereotypes with satire and a selective realism".

The Jewish-American Princess (JAP) stereotype was a construct of, and popularized by, post-war Jewish male writers, notably in Herman Wouk's 1955 novel, Marjorie Morningstar and Philip Roth's 1959 novel Goodbye, Columbus featuring princess protagonists.

== French literature ==
=== Medieval era ===
General Trends

In the broader context of medieval European literature, Jews were typically depicted through a Christian lens, which emphasized religious differences and often cast Jews in adversarial roles. This portrayal was influenced by the Church's teachings and the socio-political climate, which was generally hostile towards Jews. Literature of the time often mirrored these sentiments, using Jewish characters as foils for Christian virtues or as examples of what were perceived as negative traits like greed or betrayal.

Notable Stereotype Works

1. The Chanson de Roland: For instance, in La Chanson de Roland, Jews are portrayed in a negative light, reflecting broader societal and theological attitudes prevalent during the medieval period. This epic poem, which is one of the earliest chansons de geste, is known for its depiction of the Battle of Roncevaux and the valorization of Christian warriors, underscoring the perceived heroism of Christians in contrast to non-Christians, including Jews.
2. Literature Surrounding the Crusades: Many texts from the time of the Crusades depict Jews as enemies of Christianity. These works often justified violence and discrimination against Jews as part of a broader religious conflict.

In medieval French literature, Jews are generally presented unfavorably. However, those Jews who convert are treated favorably. For example, a Jew who is among the infidels who convert is viewed positively in the 12th-century Pèlerinage de Charlemagne a Jérusalem (Pilgrimage of Charlemagne to Jerusalem). A rare exception to the unfavorable stereotyping of Jews is a work by Peter Abelard framed as a dialogue between a Jewish and a Christian philosopher and presents Judaism in a favorable light.

=== 18th century ===
Although Voltaire was celebrated for his commitment to tolerance, his writings often included vicious stereotypes of traditional targets of prejudice such as Jews and Catholics. Discussing Voltaire's literary treatment of Jews in works such as Candide, Eric Palmer describes him as having been "uncharacteristically blind to some forms of inhumanity within his sphere." Robert Michael writes that, "Voltaire's work helped ensure that antisemitic stereotypes would persist among the educated members of French society." In his 1759 novel Candide, Voltaire uses stereotypical characterization of Jews as greedy and dishonest. For example, Cunegonde is sold to a Jewish merchant.

Despite Voltaire’s significant contributions to the movement of Enlightenment and his criticism of the Church and monarchy, his writings on Jews sometimes echoed the antisemitic sentiments of his era. Voltaire attacked the biblical belief in the unity of mankind and targeted the Old Testament and its followers in his critiques, using such attacks to challenge the Church more broadly. His antisemitic remarks were not merely strategic but seemed to stem from a deeper disdain linked to his critique of religious dogmatism.

Voltaire's complex relationship with Judaism and its followers was influential in shaping the mental climate of his time, paradoxically contributing to both the critique of traditional antisemitism and the perpetuation of new forms of racial antisemitism. His work is cited as having laid some of the groundwork for the emancipation of Jews, yet also for the antisemitic attitudes that persisted among the educated elite in France.

This dual influence highlights the complexity of Enlightenment thinkers like Voltaire, who, while pushing forward ideas of reason and tolerance, also harbored and propagated prejudiced views against certain groups, thus contributing to a mixed legacy in terms of their attitudes towards Jews.

=== 19th century ===
In the 19th century, French literature depicted Jewish characters in diverse and often stereotypical ways, reflecting societal attitudes of the period. Honoré de Balzac in La Comédie humaine portrayed Jewish characters such as greedy bankers and art collectors, using stereotypes that associated Jews with manipulation and avarice. This portrayal was consistent with the realism movement, which aimed to represent society accurately but often highlighted materialism as a dominant human motivator.

Henry H. Weinberg has described the stereotype of the Jewish banker in late nineteenth-century French literature as "shifty, cosmopolitan, cleverly manipulating ... single-minded [in his] quest for money." This stereotype is characterized by a portrayal of Jewish characters as manipulative, cunning, and overwhelmingly driven by a desire for monetary gain. Such depictions served to reinforce and justify discriminatory attitudes toward Jews in society. In France, these portrayals depicted Jews as intertwined with the financial corruption and moral decay of Parisian society, to the theatrical dramas of the time, which mirrored these literary depictions on stage.

Similarly, George Sand in her drama Les Mississipiens presented a Jewish capitalist character in a negative light, comparing him to Shakespeare's Shylock, thereby perpetuating the stereotype of the cunning Jewish financier. These literary choices by Balzac and Sand illustrate how 19th-century French literature often embedded Jewish characters within broader narratives of modernization, class struggle, and societal anxiety, reflecting and reinforcing contemporary prejudices.

=== 20th century ===
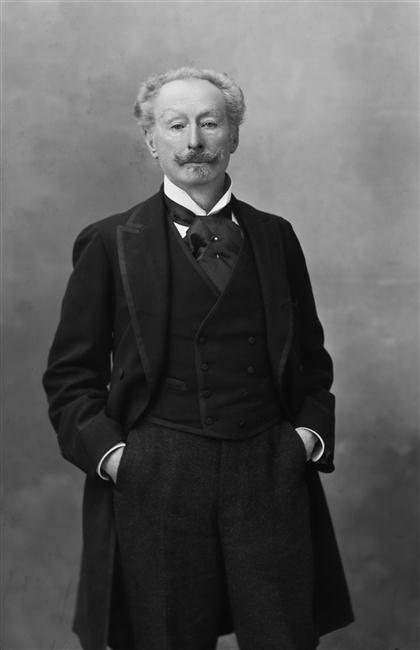
Charles Haas (1832–1902), model for Proust's novel character Charles Swann, photographed by Paul Nadar, 1895.

The most important masterpiece of French literature of the early 20th century, Marcel Proust's seven-volume novel In Search of Lost Time (published 1913−1927), features as its main hero a Jewish character: Charles Swann, the art-loving son of a Jewish stockbroker. Proust paints a very nuanced picture of Swann, with some irony, but benevolently. Proust himself was the son of a Jewish mother, but a baptized Catholic, whose own Jewish maternal grandfather, Nathée Weil, had also made his fortune as a stockbroker, from which the financially unsuccessful author was able to live comfortably throughout his life. Swann rises in the 1850s to 90s into the exclusive circle of the Jockey-Club de Paris and, thanks to his perfect manners and refined taste, becomes a close friend of high-ranking aristocrats. In the salon of the Duchesse de Guermantes, the equally exclusive and snobbish "temple" of the aristocratic "world of the Faubourg Saint-Germain", the Jewish parvenu succeeds against all odds in rising to the status of arbiter elegantiarum. The real-life model for the novel's hero, Charles Swann, was the art collector and dandy Charles Haas (1832–1902), whom Swann resembles biographically, physically and in many aspects of his character, behavior, speech and social ambition. Haas, who advised rich nobles on their art purchases, was in fact a regular acquaintance of the Prince of Wales and the only Jewish member of the Jockey Club, along with several members of the Rothschild family. Haas said of himself: "I am the only Jew who has managed to be recognized by Parisian society without being infinitely rich." However, the novel's character Swann conceals these social successes from his family's old circle of friends, including the narrator's parents. They would have hardly considered it possible − indeed, more likely inappropriate – since they had a "slightly Hindu idea" of society, with its impenetrable caste system: "They saw how elegance characterized his features, but stopped at his hooked nose like a natural boundary."

From the early 1890s, following Haas's example, Proust himself succeeded in penetrating circles of the French nobility and high aristocracy that were normally closed to a bourgeois, and thus he was able to depict this small, closed world in his work down to the finest nuances. What makes Swann's Jewishness and his social successes so important in "Lost Time" is the background of the major political issue in France at the turn of the century, the Dreyfus Affair which was ultimately an attempt by anti-Semitic sections of the population to reverse the social acceptance of Jews in France. Swann sides with the Jewish officer innocently accused of treason. Nevertheless, he himself is accused of treason by the Duke of Guermantes: since Swann has been granted exceptional access to the Duke's class, he must, out of loyalty, share its anti-Dreyfus views. However, Swann's sympathies for Dreyfus play a less central role in Proust's story than his other blatant transgression against upper-class mores: he marries his mistress, a former prostitute who is not accepted in the "best" salons where Swann himself would otherwise be welcome. Like his positioning in the Dreyfus Affair, his marriage has social consequences. While Swann is presented as a nuanced singular figure, the first-person narrator Marcel’s onetime schoolmate Albert Bloch, a pro-Dreyfus activist, brilliant but uncouth, is a caricature of the pushy, ill-mannered Jew of anti-Semitic tropes.

Going beyond the current occasion, the first-person narrator illustrates in Proust's grand, epoch-spanning panorama the changes that occur within the conservative, elite society over time: Like a kaleidoscope that is occasionally rotated, it is constantly reconfigured into new patterns. While in his childhood in the 1870s, members of French Jewry – as well as advocates of the French Third Republic – were fundamentally excluded from "elegant society," both groups gradually gained access until the Dreyfus Affair excluded Jews again. But after many Jews had proven themselves as front-line soldiers in the First World War, they were readmitted, while an Austrian prince, who had run the most elegant salon in Paris, although conservative and ultra-Catholic, suddenly found himself an "enemy." In the intermediate phases, however, as long as the kaleidoscope stands still, social immobility prevails, and this appears to those involved to be "as unchangeable and eternal as the current use of oil lamps and horsebuses". In her essay Faubourg Saint-Germain (included in her insightful work The Origins of Totalitarianism), Hannah Arendt names some of Proust's characters from the volume Sodom and Gomorrah as examples of the rootlessness of assimilated Judaism in France, including Swann.

== German literature ==
=== High German literature ===
In the first published version of the Faust legend – the anonymous Faustbuch of 1587 – Faust borrows money from a Jew, who demands one of Faust's legs as security for the debt. Faust saws off his leg and gives it to the Jew as collateral; however, when Faust subsequently returns to repay the debt, the Jew is, of course, unable to return the leg and compelled to pay Faust compensation as a result.

=== 19th century ===
The hostility towards Jews that developed in the political and cultural arenas of 19th-century German society was reflected in the literature of the era – in stark contrast to Lessing's play Nathan the Wise from 1779, the major work of the German Enlightenment of the 18th century which propagated tolerance by having the wise Jewish merchant Nathan as the main character, who was modeled to a large extent after Lessing's lifelong friend, the eminent philosopher Moses Mendelssohn.

The "Orientalness of Jews", particularly that of Jewish women, was a common trope in antisemitic German literature of the 19th century. Examples of this stereotype are found in Hauff's novella Jud Süß (1827), Hebbel's play Judith (1840) and Grillparzer's play Die Jüdin von Toledo (1872).

Another stereotype of Jews employed in German literature was to represent them as speaking in a manner that was considered defective German. This manner of speech was referred to as mauscheln, a German word based on the proper name Moishe. An example of this stereotype is the character of Jäkel the Fool who speaks in a "mock Frankfurt accent dialect" that is meant to be understood as proto-Yiddish.

Richard Levy characterizes Veitel Itzig, the villain in Gustav Freytag's Debit and Credit as "perhaps the most poisonous stereotype of the greedy, utterly immoral Jewish businessman in nineteenth-century literature." According to Jacob Katz, the message of Debit and Credit is that "Judaism alone is not capable of giving its adherents morality or culture."

=== Post-World War II ===
Since the end of World War II, negative stereotypes of the Jew have almost totally disappeared from German literature. The awareness of German crimes against Jews and the contribution of antisemitism in German literature to the ethos in which those crimes were committed have led postwar authors to work towards providing a more accurate and unbiased portrayal of the Jewish experience.

== Russian literature ==
Russian literature has a long tradition of negative Jewish stereotypes. Zvi Gitelman wrote that "Whatever their personal views of the Jewish people, pre-1881 Russian writers fell short of their liberal, humanistic ideals when they wrote of Jews." He mentions Russian classical works, such as Lermontov's The Spaniards Turgenev's The Jew, Gogol's Taras Bulba and Dead Souls, Dostoyevsky's The House of the Dead and Tolstoy's Anna Karenina among the works that have only negative images of the Jews. He compares the negative perceptions of the Jews with a similarly low view of the Russian people, "the self-hatred", common in Russian literature of the period.

"The author and the work most often attacked for creating an disseminating such stereotypes was Faddey Vanediktovich Bulgarin and his picaresque novel Ivan Vyzhigin. In chapter seven of this popular novel, Bulgarin's hero Ivan encounters the dishonest village tavern keeper Movsha and his wife Rifka and chronicles the endless dishonesty of these" Jewish characters. Although Bulgarin was a convenient scapegoat for perpetuating these stereotypes, "few Russian authors of his age, including the 'classics', avoided crude Jewish stereotypes. Nikolay Gogol's" "Yankel' in Taras Bulba lacked the malevolence of Bulgarin's Movsha, but he and other Jews are usually portrayed as ridiculous and bizarre." "One of the most repellent literary Jewish types of this period was to be found in Ivan Turgenev's early story Zhid. Despite sympathetic nuances, Dostoyevsky's Jewish convict Bumschteyn in Notes from the House of the Dead is a stereotyped character."

== See also ==
- Racial stereotypes
- Stereotypes of Jews

== Sources ==
- Cohen, Derek; Heller, Deborah (1990). Jewish presences in English literature. McGill-Queen's University Press.
- Harap, Louis (2003). The image of the Jew in American literature: from early republic to mass immigration. Syracuse University Press.
- Sternlicht, Sanford V. (2007). Masterpieces of Jewish American literature. Greenwood Publishing Group.
