= Leslie Ames =

Leslie Ames may refer to:

- Les Ames (1905–1990), English wicket-keeper and batsman
- Leslie Ames, pseudonym of Canadian writer W. E. D. Ross (1912–1995)
