= Mladá fronta =

Mladá fronta may refer to:

- Mladá fronta DNES, Czech newspaper established earlier as Mladá fronta
- Mladá fronta (company), Czech media group where Miloš Urban worked as an editor
