= Plausible Fantasies =

Plausible Fantasies or a Journey in the 29th Century (Russian: Правдоподобные небылицы, или Странствование по свету в двадцать девятом веке) (also translated by critics as Plausible Fables) was a 1824 far future time travel novel by Russian writer Faddei Bulgarin. It is the first time travel tale in Russian literature.

== History ==
In the preamble to the novel Bulgarin states that writers Mercier and Julius von Voss imagined future centuries, but their writings contained many implausible things contradicting the nature, therefore he intended to look into the future, but to imagine only plausible things, based on the fundamentals of sciences. Nicholas P. Vaslef writes that the mentioned inspirations were Mercier's L'An deux mille quatre cent quarante, rêve s'il en fut jamais (1770) and Julius von Voss' Ini: Ein Roman aus dem ein und swanzigsten Jahrhundert (1810).

In 1828 Bulgarin wrote a similar novel, A Scene from Private Life in 2028 A.D. (Сцена из частной жизни в 2028 году, от Рожд. Христова). In both novels the social order remains that of the 19th century: kings, princes, merchants, landlords. However both have many descriptions of technical wonders.

Leland Fetzer wrote that Bulgarin attempted to answer the question how the society will be transformed by scientific progress and wrote that the novel described "an artistically appealing future society transformed by scientific discovery.

The novel was translated in English by Leland Fetzer in 1982, in the anthology Pre-Revolutionary Russian Science Fiction: An Anthology (Seven Utopias and a Dream) and in Spanish (as Fábulas verosímiles, o un viaje por el mundo en el siglo XXIX) in 2016.

== Plot ==
In the year of 1824, the protagonist and his friend, while taking a yawl, discuss whether the descendants will strive for perfection. Suddenly a strong wind capsizes the yawl, the protagonist falls overboard from it and loses the consciousness, to awake exactly 1000 years later, in 2824.

== Described novelties ==
Nicholas P. Vaslef writes that a number of Bulgarin's inventions are credited to Jules Verne, who worked much later.

Leland Fetzer noted that while the novel has several glaring errors, such as aircraft flapping their wings like bats, it was "remarkably prescient".

Bulgarin describes prefabricated buildings, steam-powered cranes, central heating and electric lighting, self-propelled transport, submarines for harvesting seafood, underwater plantations with underwater dwellings, lie detectors and emotion readers (precursors of dystopic Zamyatin's and Orwell's ideas), X-ray apparatus, telephone, copier machine, and even mechanical poetry and prose writers. Schools are compulsory and controlled by government. Bulgarin puts an emphasis on the indoctrination of high moral values, implying that without them science can hardly benefit mankind.

== See also ==
- Improbable Fables, or a Journey to the Center of the Earth
- The Year 4338: Petersburg Letters, an 1835 novel by Vladimir Odoevsky
