= The Living Corpse (disambiguation) =

The Living Corpse is a 1911 play by Leo Tolstoy.

The Living Corpse may also refer to:

- The Living Corpse (novel), an 1838 novel by Vladimir Odoevsky
- The Living Corpse (1929 film), a German-Soviet silent drama film
- The Living Corpse (1967 film) or Zinda Laash, a Pakistani Urdu film
- The Living Corpse (1968 film), a Soviet film

== See also ==
- The Amazing Adventures of the Living Corpse, a 2012 film
