= Mind transfer (biological) =

Transfer of one's consciousness to another biological body

Mind transfer or identity transfer is a storytelling device seen in a variety of science fiction and supernatural fiction, in which one's consciousness is transferred into another body. A "bidirectional" mind transfer is variously called body swap, mind swap, or identity exchange.

The Encyclopedia of Science Fiction distinguishes the following mechanisms of identity transfer:

- Transfer of the personality to another body akin to mind uploading into computer
- Brain transplant
- Aliens taking over human bodies
- Shared identity, whereby the host body accepts another's mind

Body hopping is a trope wherein an entity inhabits a sequence of different bodies.

Early occurrences of mind transfer include The Year 4338: Petersburg Letters (Vladimir Odoyevsky, 1835), in which mind transfer is but a plot trick to travel into the future, and "Exchanging Their Souls" (Edward Page Mitchell, 1877), where it is used as a "wonderful cure" for a "Russian Prince Michalskovich".

== See also ==
- Human possession in science fiction
- Reincarnation
- Spirit possession
- Walk-in (concept)
