= The Year 4338: Petersburg Letters =

1835 novel by Vladimir Odoevsky

- Author: Vladimir Odoyevsky
- Original title: 4338-й год: Петербургские письма (4338-y god: Peterburgskiye pis’ma)
- Language: Russian
- Genre: Science fiction
- Published: 1835

The Year 4338: Petersburg Letters (Russian: 4338-й год: Петербургские письма) is an 1835 novel by Vladimir Odoyevsky. It is a futuristic novel set in the year 4338. According to calculations made in the 1820s, 4338 was one year before Biela's Comet was predicted to collide with the Earth; in reality, the comet disintegrated later in the 19th century. The Year 4338: Petersburg Letters was originally conceived as the third part of a trilogy, which was also to have featured depictions of Russia in the time of Peter the Great and in the author's contemporary period, the 1830s. The first part was never written, and the second and futuristic parts remained unfinished. Fragments were published in 1835 and 1840, with the fullest version appearing in 1926.

== Plot and predictions ==
As a frame narrative, the teller of the story transfers his consciousness into the body of a Chinese student, Ippolit Tsunguev in the far future. Tsunguev attends St. Petersburg's 'Main School'. His letters to his fellow students constitute the novel, hence its title.

Some of the technological advances included in the novel are air and space travel, the telephone, artificially controlled climates, and the ability to photocopy. Hallucinogenic and truth drugs, in the form of gaseous drinks and 'magnetic baths', remove hypocrisy from social life. In this envisioned future, Russia and China are the centres of global power. Russia and China have united their efforts to avoid Earth's collision with another planet. China is described as having experienced a 'deadly stagnation' which came to an end with the rule of Hin Gin in the 39th century.

The novel describes something similar to blogging, referred to as a 'home newspaper': the butler records a message with various comments of the estate owner, photocopies the record, and sends the copies to the owner's acquaintances.

== Commentary ==
Literary critics remark that the remoteness of the novel in time may be attributed to the slow pace of life in the 19th century.

== See also ==
- Plausible Fantasies, an 1824 futuristic novel by Faddei Bulgarin.
