= The Accursed (Oates novel) =

Book by Joyce Carol Oates

First edition Cover artist Giovanni Boldini, "Profile of a Young Woman", date unknown

The Accursed is the fifth volume of United States writer Joyce Carol Oates's Gothic series following Bellefleur (1980), A Bloodsmoor Romance (1982), Mysteries of Winterthurn (1984), and My Heart Laid Bare (1998). The novel was published by Ecco on March 5, 2013. It is set in and around Princeton, New Jersey in the early twentieth century, and explores a variety of supernatural themes, tracing their effect upon members of several families who reside in the area. The Accursed contains a number of historical figures used in a fictional context, among them President Woodrow Wilson, and writers Mark Twain, Jack London and Upton Sinclair and his first wife Meta.

The Accursed was well-reviewed by a number of major authors, with writer Stephen King describing it in The New York Times Book Review as "the world's first postmodern Gothic novel".
