= Improbable Fables, or a Journey to the Center of the Earth =

1925 Russian satirical fantastic novel by Faddei Bulgarin

Improbable Fables, or a Journey to the Center of the Earth (Russian: Невероятные небылицы или Путешествие к средоточию Земли) is an 1825 fantastic satirical allegory by Russian writer Faddei Bulgarin. Presented as a (fictional) manuscript, the novel is a tale of a man who fell through a hole at Novaya Zemlya and visited three underground countries, Ignorantia (Игноранция), Beastia or Cattlia (Скотиния, Skotinia), and Enlightia (Светония, Svetonia), the three being satires for three strata of the Russian society.

This "Hollow Earth"-type novel was modeled after the 1741 satirical fantasy Niels Klim's Underground Travels by the Norwegian-Danish author Ludvig Holberg. Other suggested influences are Gulliver's Travels and the underground cities in the 1810 novel Ini: Ein Roman aus dem ein und zwanzigsten Jahrhundert ["Ini: A Novel from the Twenty First Century"] by Julius von Voss.

Due to this novel and another two, of the same fantastic type, Plausible Fantasies or a Journey in the 29th Century and A Scene from Private Life in the Year 2028 A.D, Bulgarin was described as the first modern Russian author to write in the genre of utopia, although Bulganin's utopias are predated in Russia by the 1784 novel The Travel to the Land of Ophir (Russian: Путешествие в землю Офирскую) by Mikhail Shcherbatov.

Darko Suvin writes that the novel is of little literary significance, but presents some interest for critics, in particular, for its portraying social classes as separate races, predating the use of this device in The Time Machine by H. G. Wells.
