= Mnemozina =

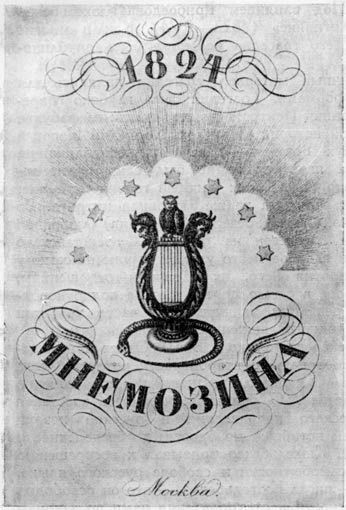
- Mnemozina cover, 1824.
- Editor: Vladimir Odoevsky; Wilhelm Küchelbecker
- Frequency: Quarterly
- Founded: 1824
- Final issue: 1825
- Based in: Moscow
- Language: Russian

Mnemozina (Russian: Мнемозина, IPA: [mnʲɪmɐˈzʲinə]) was a quarterly literary almanac, published in Moscow from 1824 to 1825. The full title in the Russian language is Мнемозина, собрание сочинений в стихах и прозе (Mnemozina, collected works in verse and prose) and was a reference to Mnemosyne, a persona in Greek mythology embodying memory. The main editors were Wilhelm Küchelbecker, and Vladimir Odoevsky.

== History ==
Mnemozina came about as a production of the Lovers of Wisdom society, a literary and philosophical circle created by Odoevsky and Dmitry Venevitinov in the early 1820s. Besides Odoevsky, Venevitinov and Küchelbecker, the Society counted Aleksey Khomyakov, Mikhail Pogodin and others as members.

Alexander Pushkin, who was attracted to Mnemozina through his friends Küchelbecker and Venevitinov, was an admirer of the magazine's publications. Pushkin contributed his poem The Demon to Mnemozina.

Mnemozina was devoted to the consideration and debate of the ideas of the French Encyclopédistes of the eighteenth century, and to the spread of German idealism.

The direct successor to Mnemozina was The Russian Messenger.
