= A Bloodsmoor Romance =

1982 novel by Joyce Carol Oates

- First edition
- Author: Joyce Carol Oates
- Language: English
- Publisher: E. P. Dutton
- Publication date: 1982
- Publication place: United States
- Media type: Print (hardback)
- Pages: 615
- ISBN: 978-0525241126

A Bloodsmoor Romance is a novel by Joyce Carol Oates first published in 1982 by E. P. Dutton and reprinted by Warner Books in 1983. It is the second novel in her Gothic Saga, following Bellefleur (1982) and followed by Mysteries of Winterthurn (1984), My Heart Laid Bare (1998), and The Accursed (2013).

The narrative and characters are written in the manner common to 19th century romance novels, but here serving as a parody of the genre.

== Table of book contents ==
I. The Outlaw Balloon
II. The Passionate Courtship
III. The Unloos'd Demon
IV. The Yankee Pedlar's Son
V. The Wide World
VI. Ivory-Black; or, The Spirit World
VII. "Unsung Americans..."
VIII. The Mark of the Beast
IX. "Adieu! 'Tis Love's Last Greeting"

== Plot ==
A Bloodsmoor Romance is a parody of the domestic romance literary genre popular in 19th century Europe and the Americas. The story is told by a elderly and morally conservative spinster who persistently editorials on the events and individuals she describes.

The narrative concerns members of the Kiddemaster and Zinn families, centering on the romances of the five Zinn sisters: Octavia, Constance Phillipa, Samantha, Malvinia, and Deirdre. Their father is the patriarchal John Quincy Zinn, something of a mad scientist.

The most submissive and obedient of the daughters is Octavia, who marries the elderly Reverend Rumford. He accidentally kills himself with the accoutrements he employs when having sex with Octavia. The young widow's virtue is rewarded when she remarries, this time to a handsome swain.

Another of the Zinn girls is a true tomboy, Constance Phillipa: she wisely absconds on her wedding night from the homicidal Baron von Mainz before the union can be consummated. She adopts male attire and lives as a man, ultimately morphing into a male.

Samantha, the brightest of the girls, is subject to some of her father's bizarre experiments. She falls in love with Nahum Hareton, and they run away after the young man returns from a journey on Zinn's time machine. Samantha proves her superior intelligence by inventing a number of labor-saving devices for women.

The libidinous Malvinia is an aspiring actress and discovers her overwhelming sexuality, a shock to herself and her male lovers; the latter include the author Mark Twain. In an effort to suppress her proclivities, Malvinia marries the upright Mr. Kennicott, who agrees to live with her as a sibling.

Deirdre, adopted by Mr. Zinn, is endowed with psychic powers. She is transported away in a hot-air balloon and returns as a practitioner of the occult, apprentice to the theosophist Madame Blavatsky. Male scientific researchers attempt to discover the source of Deirdre's powers and are liquidated by denizens of the spirit world.

Deirdre temporarily descends into madness. Unlike her sisters, she fails to find a mate and instead cares for her dying father. In the final scene, Deirdre discovers his formula for atomic fusion. Destroying it, she is conflicted as to whether her act has advanced or inhibited the fortunes of humanity.

== Reception ==
Literary critic Diane Johnson at the New York Times praises Oates for her success in satirizing the patriarchal social norms of turn-of-the-century Americans as well describing the clothing and artifacts that identified the upper-middle class. Oates humorously reproduces the "Victorian postures and archaic diction" typical of that social group.

Johnson observes that "the satirical qualities do not falsify but illuminate the genre. This is a difficult mode worked successfully by Gore Vidal but very few others.

Reviewer Bruce Allen at the Christian Science Monitor characterizes the novel as "a witty commentary on American ingenuity, imperialism, and injustice." Allen detects a feminist element "in its sardonic emphasis on men's utter ignorance of what women are really like, Bloodsmoor is, really, a rather subversive book."

== Critical appraisal ==
"A Bloodspore Romance shows women struggling with limitations...imposed on them by stereotypes that bifurcate female possibility into valueless opposites. To be good is to be submissive, selfless, and sexless. To be bad is to be willful, passionate, and sexual. The bifurcation, unless escaped, leads to repression, emptiness, and madness."—Biographer Joanne V. Creighton in Joyce Carol Oates: Novels of the Middle Years (1992).

"[T]he real subject is the lot of women, especially the customs and attitudes that confined and oppressed them in the 19th century, but also the present-day remnants of those conditions. Thus the book is a feminist romance with a lot of axes to grind, and it grinds them wittily till their edges are polished to a fine sharpness."—Novelist and essayist Diane Johnson

Biographer and critic Joanne V. Creighton places A Bloodsmoor Romance among the "fabulistic novels," that operates both as a parody of 19th century romances, and as a critique of the social attitudes that produced such literature.

The narrative is secondary to the subtext that Oates inserts critiquing these attitudes from a contemporary and feminist perspective.

While the old-fashioned author attempts to tell her tale, Joyce Carol Oates, breaks the illusion of realism, burlesques the norms, and develops a witty feminist subtext.

Creighton reminds readers that the Zinn sisters are the literary descendants of Alcott's decidedly non-satirical Little Women (1868).

Critic Diane Johnson notes the function of the unreliable narrator: when the emphatically conformist narrator condemns any hint of licentiousness in feminine behavior "we cannot miss the novelist's intention, which is to emphasize their ridiculousness..."

== Sources ==
- Allen, Bruce. 1984. "Oates's new mystery; Mysteries of Winterthurn." Christian Science Monitor, February 1, 1984. https://www.csmonitor.com/1984/0201/020104.html Accessed February 10, 2025.
- Creighton, Joanne V.. 1979. Joyce Carol Oates: Novels of the Middle Years. Twayne Publishers, New York. Warren G. French, editor. ISBN 0-8057-7647-8
- Johnson, Diane. 1982. "Balloons and Abductions." New York Times, September 5, 1982. https://archive.nytimes.com/www.nytimes.com/books/98/07/05/specials/oates-bloodsmoor.html Accessed 10 January 2025.
- Oates, Joyce Carol. 1982. A Bloodsmoor Romance. E. P. Dutton, New York. ISBN 978-0525241126
