= Dark Shadows (book series) =

Novel series by Marilyn Ross

- Author: Marilyn Ross
- Country: United States
- Language: English
- Genre: Gothic romance, tie-in
- Publisher: Paperback Library
- Published: 1966–1972
- Media type: Print (Paperback)
- No. of books: 33 (List of books)

Dark Shadows is a Gothic romance novel series based on the American horror television series of the same name. Thirty-three books, including a novelization of the 1970 feature film House of Dark Shadows, were published by Paperback Library from 1966 to 1972. The novels are credited to Marilyn Ross, a pseudonym of Canadian author W. E. D. Ross.

== Production ==
The novels were published by Paperback Library between 1966 and 1972 and sold approximately 17 million copies. W. E. D. Ross, a prolific author who specialized in popular fiction, was selected for the series due to his experience in the genre and his ability to produce manuscripts quickly. According to Ross, he wrote each novel within three weeks. Instead of adapting scenarios from the television series, Ross chose to develop original storylines, using only the characters and setting of the series, to provide readers with a "fresh viewpoint".

With the exception of the House of Dark Shadows novelization, which adapts the 1970 feature film, the novels do not follow the televised narrative. The novels reflect conventions of Gothic fiction, including an emphasis on atmospheric settings, haunted locations, and family secrets. Many stories center on a young woman living at, or arriving at, the Collinwood estate who becomes entangled in a romantic relationship amid a supernatural threat.

=== Series development ===
The early novels focus on the character of Victoria Winters, depicting her arrival at Collinwood as a governess and her attempts to uncover her origins. Following the 1968 departure of actress Alexandra Moltke from the television series, the character was removed from subsequent novels. The vampire Barnabas Collins is portrayed as both a threatening and protective figure throughout much of the series. The novels shifted their emphasis toward other characters as the series continued, including Barnabas and Quentin Collins. Later novels included stories originally planned for the television series that were never filmed, such as a cursed mummy story partially adapted as Barnabas, Quentin and the Mummy's Curse.

Continuity within the series itself is limited, and most entries function as self-contained stories despite recurring characters and settings. In addition to the Collinses, later entries incorporated a wider range of supernatural themes, including werewolves, ghosts, mummies, and other creatures and occult mysteries, in line with the television series.

=== Cover art ===
The books were issued in paperback format and featured both painted covers and photographic stills from the television series, which were often unrelated to the plots. Early volumes were widely printed, while later titles had smaller print runs and are less common. Ross owned a number of the original cover paintings.

== Novels ==
No.	Title	Release date	Catalog	Notes
1	Dark Shadows	December 1966	52-386	Partial re-telling of Victoria Winters's arrival in Collinsport
2	Victoria Winters	March 1967	52-421	
3	Strangers at Collins House	September 1967	52-543	
4	The Mystery of Collinwood	January 1968	52-610	
5	The Curse of Collinwood	May 1968	52-608	
6	Barnabas Collins	November 1968	62-001	First novel to feature Barnabas Collins
7	The Secret of Barnabas Collins	January 1969	62-039	
8	The Demon of Barnabas Collins	April 1969	62-084	Barnabas depicted as heroic in line with changes made by the television series
9	The Foe of Barnabas Collins	July 1969	62-135	
10	The Phantom and Barnabas Collins	September 1969	62-195	
11	Barnabas Collins Versus the Warlock	October 1969	62-212	Inspired by The Turn of the Screw by Henry James
12	The Peril of Barnabas Collins	November 1969	62-244	
13	Barnabas Collins and the Mysterious Ghost	January 1970	63-258	
14	Barnabas Collins and Quentin's Demon	February 1970	63-275	First novel to feature Quentin Collins
15	Barnabas Collins and the Gypsy Witch	March 1970	63-296	
16	Barnabas, Quentin and the Mummy's Curse	April 1970	63-318	Based on story originally planned for the television series
17	Barnabas, Quentin and the Avenging Ghost	May 1970	63-338	
18	Barnabas, Quentin and the Nightmare Assassin	June 1970	63-363	
19	Barnabas, Quentin and the Crystal Coffin	July 1970	63-385	Inspired by The Premature Burial by Edgar Allan Poe
20	Barnabas, Quentin and the Witch's Curse	August 1970	63-402	
21	Barnabas, Quentin and the Haunted Cave	September 1970	63-427	
22	Barnabas, Quentin and the Frightened Bride	October 1970	63-446	
—	House of Dark Shadows	October 1970	64-537	Film novelization
23	Barnabas, Quentin and the Scorpio Curse	November 1970	63-468	
24	Barnabas, Quentin and the Serpent	December 1970	63-491	
25	Barnabas, Quentin and the Magic Potion	January 1971	63-515	
26	Barnabas, Quentin and the Body Snatchers	February 1971	63-534	Inspired by The Body Snatchers by Jack Finney
27	Barnabas, Quentin and Dr. Jekyll's Son	April 1971	63-554	Inspired by Strange Case of Dr Jekyll and Mr Hyde by Robert Louis Stevenson
28	Barnabas, Quentin and the Grave Robbers	June 1971	63-585	
29	Barnabas, Quentin and the Sea Ghost	August 1971	64-663	
30	Barnabas, Quentin and the Mad Magician	October 1971	64-714	
31	Barnabas, Quentin and the Hidden Tomb	December 1971	64-772	
32	Barnabas, Quentin and the Vampire Beauty	March 1972	64-824	
