= Mysteries of Winterthurn =

Gothic detective novel

- First edition
- Author: Joyce Carol Oates
- Language: English
- Publisher: E. P. Dutton
- Publication date: 1984
- Publication place: United States
- Media type: Print (hardback)
- Pages: 482
- ISBN: 978-0525242086

Mysteries of Winterthurn is a Gothic- detective novel by Joyce Carol Oates first published in 1984 by E. P. Dutton and reprinted by Berkley Books in 1985. Oates blends the detective genre with Gothic elements in the three mysteries that comprise the novel. It is the third novel in her Gothic Saga, following Bellefleur (1980) and A Bloodsmoor Romance (1982) and followed by My Heart Laid Bare (1998) and The Accursed (2013).

== Plot ==
Mysteries of Winterthurn is set in the fictional Winterthurn City in upstate New York near the turn of the 19th century. Xavier Kilgarvan is featured in three mysteries as the detective, who in his teens first investigates macabre homicides at the estate of his wealthy relatives. The solution to these bizarre events reveal lurid family secrets. He falls in love with his distant cousin Perdita.

Xavier embarks on another case in his late twenties which raises questions as to his moral fitness to conduct the investigation. Xavier takes his last case at age forty, now the height of his renown. Xavier mysteriously withdraws from the profession of crime detection—after his obsessive struggle to solve the mystery of "The Bloodstained Bridal Gown." In a number of surprising twists, he manages to unravel the grisly triple murder—and to resolve his long standing passion for the enigmatic Perdita.

== Reception ==
Calling the work "essentially an entertainment," reviewer Bruce Allen recommends Mysteries of Winterthurn despite its "fruity period style, weighted with apostrophic excesses." Oates sprinkles the novel with sly literary and historical references: "Jack the Ripper, the Rosenberg case, Emily Dickinson, Charles Brockden Brown's Wieland (1798), and Hawthorne's The Blithedale Romance (1852).

Michiko Kakutani at the New York Times gave her assessment:

One assumes that Miss Oates set out, with Mysteries, to write a book that at once satirizes a popular genre and fulfills its own storytelling requirements. If she is heavy-handed in achieving her first objective, however, she is even clumsier with the second.

== Background and interpretation ==
Oates based the three mysteries upon composite cases she found in newspapers.

1) The Virgin in the Rose-Bower or "The Tragedy at Glen Mawr Manor." Oates writes: "The first is derived primarily from a small, disturbing item I saw in the paper—several mummified infants were found in an attic of an elderly maiden lady, after her death. She'd lived with an older brother for most of her life."

A catalog of horrific acts are documented in the "Honeymoon Room at Glen Mawr Manor: infant deaths, mutilated corpses, poisoned husbands, and mad women." The first incident Xavier investigates involves a dead child, the back of whose head has been "grossly eaten away." The themes exhibit manichaean contrasts: "natural and supernatural, good and evil, past and present, animate and inanimate, living and dead..." Biographer Joanne V. Creighton reduces the central theme of this mystery to a maxim: "Thwarted love turns to demonic evil."

The 16-year-old Xavier Kilgarvan's , who seeks to emulate his heroes C. Auguste Dupin and Sherlock Holmes, is so shocked by the brutality of the domestic sexual violence and murder perpetrated by the Kilgarvan clan (of which he is a distant relative), he destroys his investigative notes. He acts in part out of his love for a survivor of the ordeal, the beautiful Perdida, his 12-year-old cousin, who has—Lizzie Borden-style—dispatched her parents.

"Xavier Kilgarvan repeatedly comes up against the dark underside of a stridently patriarchal world, and its darkness is inevitably with women and crimes against women."—Biographer Joanne V. Creighton in Joyce Carol Oates: Novels of the Middle Years (1992).

2) Devil's Half-Acre or "The Mystery of the Cruel Suitor"

Joyce Carol Oates reports: "The second mystery is derived from a number of serial murders whose victims were young girls..." Creighton notes the thematic and narrative similarities of this mystery with that of Nathaniel Hawthorne's Young Goodman Brown (1835). As in the early short story, the local residents emerge as accessories to the recent murder of several young factory girls on a site where witch's masses had been held in 1759.

Xavier, now in his late-twenties, has his faith in the "intelligent, pragmatic and systematic" principles of a detective shaken by self-doubt as to the nature of the Universe and his ability to access objective reality. At trial, the murderer and "cruel suitor" Valentine WesterGaard, is found guilty based on the evidence. Yet he is judged innocent by the local jury: their misogynistic views determine that the young women provoked their assailant.

Valentine, now free, taunts Xavier, suggesting that the detective may, too, be possessed by evil spirits, and identifying him as his doppelganger. Creighton notes: "These linkages seem to portend Xavier's implication in the evils he studies."

3) The Bloodstained Bridal Gown or "Xavier Kilgarvan's Last Case"

According to Joyce Carol Oates, the third mystery "is based upon a notorious New Brunswick, New Jersey case of the 1920s, sensationally known as 'the case of the minister and the choir singer.' That's to say, an amalgam of this case, and Lizzie Borden, and very likely one or two others."

In the aftermath of solving the case, Xavier collapses in a nervous breakdown. Upon recovery, he admits that he and Perdita, and wife, the murdered.

The of last of the mysteries, "The Blood-Stained Bridal Gown" exposes the fraudulent claim that the iconic detective, here represented by Xavier, triumphs over evil:

Rather than serving as an emblem of man's triumph over circumstances...detective fiction is shown to be an inadequate genre of control and order; the narrator's pat assurances do not ring true.

Literary critic Kakutani detects the same thematic elements:

Miss Oates is also commenting on the old-fashioned, moralistic conventions of the mystery genre—whose tidy plots imply that order can be restored to society by the simple act of identifying and capturing a criminal—and the limitations of its philosophical outlook.

== Sources ==
- Allen, Bruce. 1984. "Oates's new mystery; Mysteries of Winterthurn." Christian Science Monitor, February 1, 1984. https://www.csmonitor.com/1984/0201/020104.html Accessed February 10, 2025.
- Creighton, Joanne V. 1979. Joyce Carol Oates: Novels of the Middle Years. Twayne Publishers, New York. Warren G. French, editor. ISBN 0-8057-7647-8
- Kakutani, Michiko. 1984. Books of the Times, February 10, 1984. https://www.nytimes.com/1984/02/10/books/books-of-the-times-235770.html Accessed, 31 January 2025.
- Oates, Joyce Carol. 1984. Mysteries of Winterthurn. Dutton Press, New York. ISBN 978-0525242086
