= Lord Mord =

Lord Mord is a Czech historical novel, written by Miloš Urban. It was first published in 2008.

The book is set in Prague in the late 1800s, a time of social upheaval.

== Reception ==
Petr Nagy of iLiteratura praised the book, recognizing the author's comfort with the genre, and sincere interest in the setting. Notimex called the story a classic of the author's.

CzechLit concluded, "A dizzying cocktail of mystery, murder and Gothic romance, Lord Mord is more than worthy of an author who has been dubbed ‘the dark knight of Czech literature’."
