= Ivan Vejeeghen =

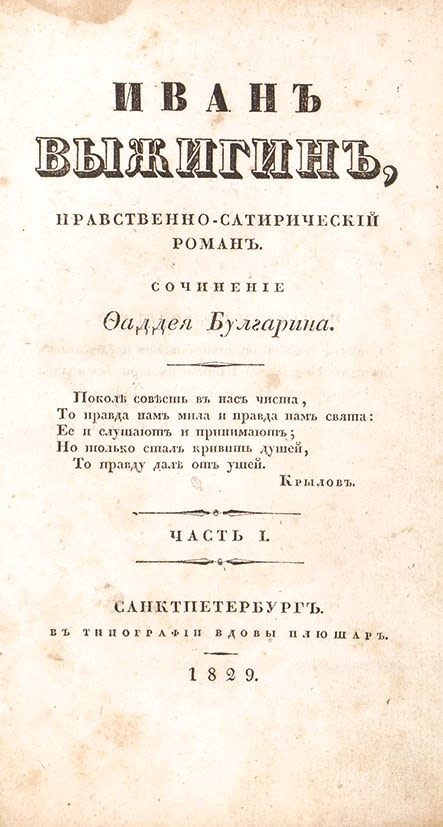
1829 Russian edition of Ivan Vejeeghen

Ivan Vejeeghen (Russian: Иван Выжигин, romanized: Ivan Vyzhigin) is an 1829 satirical Russian picaresque novel by Faddei Bulgarin. It is in the form of a memoir of one Ivan Vejeeghen (or Vyzhigin), a peasant orphan growing up in early 19th century Russia.

The novel is considered to be the first best-seller in Russia, outselling more literary authors such as Alexander Pushkin. The first edition sold out in seven days, and seven thousand copies before the end of the year; more than ten thousand were sold overall. By 1832 it had been translated into French, Polish, German, Swedish, Italian, Dutch, Spanish, and English (an English version was published in London in 1831 and in Philadelphia in 1832), and was one of the first works of Russian literature to be widely read in the West.

== Social criticism ==
Bulgarin's novel as a subtitle Нравственно-сатирический роман, "A moral satirical novel". The protagonist is an orphan adopted by a petty nobleman Gologorovsky, who is described as useless for the society, but boasts his ancient descent. During his adventures, Ivan meets and describes both positive and negative, for which, and for the blunt didactic style in many places, he was both praised and chastised.

In chapter six "Богатый Жид. Источники его Богатства" ("A Rich Jew: Sources of His Wealth") of the novel, Ivan describes a dishonest rich tavern (korchma) keeper Movsha and his wife Rifka. John Klier cites this as an example of antisemitism.
