= Russian Nights =

Russian Nights (Russian: Русские ночи / Russkie nochi) is an 1844 collection of philosophical essays and novellas by Vladimir Odoyevsky. The work is a sprawling Gothic "frame-novel", built on Romantic principles inspired by Friedrich von Hardenberg (Novalis, 1772–1801) and Friedrich Wilhelm Joseph von Schelling (1775–1854), loosely modelled on the Noctes Atticae, and which like E. T. A. Hoffmann mixes genres and styles.
