= The Seven Churches =

Sedmikostelí (English: The Seven Churches) is a novel by Czech author Miloš Urban, first published in 1998. The book is a Gothic historical crime fiction story set in modern-day Nove Mesto, Prague, following a main character, K, who witnesses an accident followed by several murders. The book was translated into 11 languages and became a best-seller in Spain as well as the Czech Republic. A review in Berliner Morgenpost commented that "Urban writes so vividly that the rich history of Prague architecture becomes almost a major theme of this extraordinary book".
