= Bellefleur (novel) =

1980 novel by Joyce Carol Oates

- First edition
- Author: Joyce Carol Oates
- Language: English
- Genre: novel
- Publisher: E. P. Dutton
- Publication date: 1980
- Publication place: United States
- Media type: Print (hardback)
- Pages: 558
- ISBN: 978-0525063025

Bellefleur is a novel by Joyce Carol Oates first published in 1980 by E. P. Dutton and reprinted by Obelisk Press in 1987. It is the first novel in her Gothic Saga, followed by A Bloodsmoor Romance (1982), Mysteries of Winterthurn (1984), My Heart Laid Bare (1998), and The Accursed (2013).

== Plot ==
The novel is a Gothic saga of the Bellefleur family spanning several generations. The two focal characters are the wealthy and powerful Gidion Bellfleur and his beautiful and psychic spouse, Leah. Their home is Bellefleur castle and its vast properties, where they live with their three children, along with various relatives and servants.

The extended family includes members resembling figures from the Grand Guignol: a spiritual savant, homicidal maniac, an incestuous uncle and niece, a scientific boy-wonder, siamese twins, and a female vampire. Leah is determined to restore the Bellefleur estate to its former glory. Gideon distracts himself by indulging in the licentious entertainments of the rich.

The elder members of the clan are ultimately destroyed, but the children break free of the Bellefleur curse and emerge with a measure of independence and optimism.

== Reception ==
New York Times reviewer John Gardner declares Bellefleur "an awesome construction, in itself a work of genius," but regrets that "the artifice undermines emotional power, making the book cartoonish." Gardner forgives Oates her literary idiosyncrasies evident in the novel and acknowledging its "brilliance: "Though Bellefleur is not her best book, in my opinion it's a wonderful book all the same."

== Critical appraisal ==
"Bellefleur is a work of the imagination and must obey, with both humility and audacity, imagination's laws...the implausible is granted an authority and honored with a complexity usually reserved for realistic fiction...Bellefleur is a region, a state of the soul, and it does exist; and there, sacrosanct, its laws are utterly logical."—Biographer Joanne V. Crieghton in Joyce Carol Oates: The Novels of the Middle Years (1992).

Critic John Gardner characterizes the novel as a medieval allegory—caritas versus cupiditas (charity vs. desire)—a struggle for ascendancy between "selflessness" and "selfishness." Though non-sectarian in her views, Oates is nonetheless "a religious novelist" and Bellefleur "the most openly religious of her books."

Literary critic Joanne V. Creighton describes Bellefleur as a "reworking of nineteenth century genres" and an "imaginative playing out of the dualites at the heart of the American dream and the American character."

Creighton ranks Bellefleur among "our great American novels."

== Sources ==
- Creighton, Joanne V. 1992. Joyce Carol Oates: Novels of the Middle Years. Twayne Publishers, New York. Warren G. French, editor. ISBN 0-8057-7647-8
- Gardner, John. 1980. The Strange Real World. New York Times, July 20, 1980, https://archive.nytimes.com/www.nytimes.com/books/97/09/21/reviews/oates-bellefleur.html Accessed 31 January 2025.
- Johnson, Greg. 1994. Joyce Carol Oates: A Study of the Short Fiction. Twayne's studies in short fiction; no. 57. Twayne Publishers, New York. ISBN 0-8057-0857-X
- Oates, Joyce Carol. 1980. Bellefleur. E. P. Dutton, New York. ISBN 978-0525063025
