= W. E. D. Ross =

Canadian writer (1912–1995)

William Edward Daniel Ross
- Born: William Edward Daniel Ross; November 16, 1912; Saint John, New Brunswick, Canada
- Died: November 1, 1995 (aged 82); Saint John, New Brunswick, Canada
- Spouse(s): Charlotte McCormack (m. 1944; died 1959), Marilyn Ann Clark (m. 1960–1995)
- Children: No
- Writing career
- Pen name: Olin Ross, Dan Roberts, Jane Rossiter, Leslie Ames, Ellen Randolph, Ann Gilmer, Dan Ross, W. E. D. Ross, Rose Williams, Rose Dana, Clarissa Ross, Marilyn Ross, Jan Daniels, Charlotte McCormack, Ruth Dorset, Miriam Leslie, Tex Steele, Dana Ross, Laura Frances Brooks, Lydia Colby, Diana Randall, Marilyn Carter
- Language: English
- Period: 1961–1987

William Edward Daniel Ross (November 16, 1912 – November 1, 1995) was a Canadian actor, playwright, and bestselling writer of more than 300 novels in a variety of genres. He was known for the speed of his writing and was, by some estimates, the most prolific Canadian author ever, though he did not take up fiction until middle age.

He wrote popular romances and Gothic fiction as W. E. D. Ross and Dan Ross, and under a variety of mostly female pseudonyms, such as Jane Rossiter, Leslie Ames, Ellen Randolph, Ann Gilmer, Rose Williams, Rose Dana, Clarissa Ross, Marilyn Ross, Jan Daniels, Charlotte McCormack, Ruth Dorset, Miriam Leslie, Dana Ross, Laura Frances Brooks, Lydia Colby, Diana Randall, Diana Ross, and Marilyn Carter. He started writing erotic novels as Olin Ross, and Western novels as Dan Roberts and Tex Steele. As Marilyn Ross, he wrote popular Gothic fiction, including a series of novels about the vampire Barnabas Collins based on the American TV series Dark Shadows (1966–1971).

== Biography ==
William Edward Daniel Ross was born on November 16, 1912, in Saint John, New Brunswick, Canada, the son of Laura (née Brooks) and William Edward Ross. In 1934, he moved to the United States to study. He married Charlotte McCormack in 1944, and worked for years as an actor, as the manager of an acting company, and in broadcasting. After his wife died in 1959, he returned to Saint John. In 1960, he married for the second time, to nurse Marilyn Ann Clark. At about this same time, he began writing novels, and found rapid success.

Ross appeared as himself on the January 31, 1966 episode of the CBS game show To Tell the Truth. He received two votes.

His second wife, Marilyn, served as the first reader of his works, and "Marilyn Ross" was one of his favorite pseudonyms.

He died in Saint John on November 1, 1995, aged 82; he was survived by his wife.

== Bibliography ==
Many of his novels have been published under different titles or pseudonyms.

=== As Olin Ross ===
==== Single novels ====
- The Case of the Naked Diver (1961)
- Lust Planet (1962)

=== As Dan Roberts ===
==== Single novels ====
- Wyoming Showdown (1961)
- The Wells Fargo Brand (1964)
- Outlaw's Gold (1965)
- The Cheyenne Kid (1965)
- Durez City Bonanza (1965)
- Stage to Link City (1966)
- Vengeance Rider (1966)
- Wyoming Range War (1966)
- Lawman of Blue Rock (1967)
- Yuma Brand (1967)
- Incident at Haddon City (1968)
- The Dawn Riders (1968)
- Sheriff of Mad River (1969)
- Sheriff's Sterven (1970)

=== As Jane Rossiter ===
==== Single novels ====
- Summer Season (1962)
- Backstage Nurse (1963)
- Beth Comes Home (1964)
- Summer Star (1964)
- Love Is a Riddle (1967)
- Winslow's Daughter (1967)

=== As Leslie Ames ===
==== Single novels ====
- Bride of Donnybrook (1962)
- The Hungry Sea (1967)
- The Hidden Chapel (1967)
- Castle on the Island (1968)
- The Hill of Ashes (1968)
- The House of Haddon (1969)
- King's Castle (1970)
- The Angry Wind (1970)
- Wind Over the Citadel (1971)
- The Phantom Bride (1972)

=== As Ellen Randolph ===
==== Single novels ====
- Personal Secretary = Alice in Love (1963)
- Nurse of the North Woods (1966)
- The Secret of Graytowers = The Haunting of Nurse Jean (1968)
- Threads of Love (1969)
- Nurse Martha's Wish (1983)

=== As Ann Gilmer ===
==== Single novels ====
- The Fog and the Stars (1963)
- Kate Wilder, R. N. (1964)
- Nurse Crane... Emergency (1964)
- Traveling With Sara (1965)
- Winds of Change (1965)
- Glamour Girl (1966)
- Lisa Ray, Copy Girl (1966)
- A Castle for the Nurse (1967)
- Nurse in the Tropics (1967)
- Girl in Love (1968)
- Nurse on Call (1968)
- Private Nurse (1969)
- Celebrity Nurse (1970)
- Nurse on Emergency (1970)
- Skyscraper Nurse (1976)
- Love in the Sun (1978)
- Nurse at Breakwater Hotel (1982)

=== As Dan Ross ===
==== Single novels ====
- Out of the Night (1963)
- Murder at City Hall (1965)
- The Mystery of Fury Castle (1965)
- Secret of Mallet Castle (1966)
- Fogbound (1967)
- The Third Spectre (1967)
- Behind Locked Shutters (1968)
- Cliffhaven (1968)
- Dark Villa of Capri (1968)
- Dark of the Moon (1969)
- Dark Is My Shadow (1970)
- Nurse in Crisis (1971)
- Psychiatric Nurse (1971)
- A Nurse's Choice (1972)
- The Pride of Nurse Edna (1974)
- Moscow Maze (1983)

=== As W. E. D. Ross ===
==== Single novels ====
- Alice in Love (1963)
- Love Is Forever (1963)
- Answer My Heart (1965)
- Citadel of Love (1965)
- Romance in Montparnasse (1966)
- To Know and to Love (1966)
- Wilderness Nurse (1966)
- The Castle on the Cliff (1967)
- Love Must Not Waver (1967)
- Rendezvous in Austria (1967)
- So Mocking, My Love (1967)
- The Ghost of Oaklands (1967)
- Bridge to Love (1968)
- Castle on the Hill (1968)
- Let Your Heart Answer (1968)
- The Enchanted Voyage (1968)
- The Twilight Web (1968)
- Christopher's Mansion (1969)
- Dark Is My Shadow (1969)
- Summer Romance (1969)
- Our Share of Love (1969)
- The Need to Love (1969)
- Luxury Liner Nurse (1969)
- An Act of Love (1970)
- Sable in the Rain (1970)
- The Web of Love (1970)
- The Whispering Gallery (1970)
- This Man, I Love (1970)
- Magic Valley (1970)
- Beauty Doctor's Nurse (1970)
- Mansion on the Moors (1971)
- The Music Room (1971)
- The Yesteryear Phantom (1971)
- King of Romance (1971)
- A Nurse's Choice (1972)
- Rothhaven (1972)
- The House on Mount Vernon Street (1972)
- Reunion in Renfrew (1972)
- The Haunted Garden (1973)
- Nurse's Love Story (1973)
- Dark Mansion (1973)
- Nurse in a Crisis (1973)
- Summer's End (1973)
- Nurse in Turmoil (1973)
- One Louisburg Square (1974)
- Witch of Goblin's Acres (1974)
- An End of Summer (1974)
- Midhaven (1975)
- Nightmare Abbey (1975)
- House on Lime Street (1976)
- The Queen's Stairway (1978)
- Hospital Crisis (1979)
- The Dark Lane (1979)
- Nurse at the Ritz (1979)
- Magic of Love (1980)
- Nurse Ann's Secret (1980)
- Phantom of Edgewater Hall (1980)
- Phantom in Red (1981)
- Murder Game (1982)
- This Uncertain Love (1982)
- Summer of the Shaman (1982)
- Flight to Romance (1983)
- The Ghostly Jewels (1983)
- The Smiles of Summer (1984)
- Nurse Janice's Dream (1984)
- A Love Discovered (1984)
- Rehearsal for Love (1984)
- Portrait of Love (1985)
- Summer Playhouse (1986)
- Dangerous Heart (1986)

=== As Rose Williams ===
==== Single novels ====
- Five Nurses (1964)
- Nurse in Doubt (1965)
- Nurse in Nassau (1967)
- A Bridge for Judith (1968)
- Airport Nurse (1968)

=== As Rose Dana ===
==== Single novels ====
- Surgeon's Nurse (1964)
- Bermuda Nurse (1965)
- Night Club Nurse (1965)
- Operating Room Nurse (1965)
- Nurse Freda (1966)
- Arctic Nurse (1966)
- Journey to Romance (1966)
- Willow Lodge (1966)
- Down East Nurse (1967)
- Nurse in Jeopardy (1967)
- The Brooding Mists (1967)
- The Uneasy Heart (1967)
- Construction Camp Nurse (1968)
- Homecoming Nurse (1968) aka Whitebridge Nurse
- Labrador Nurse (1968)
- Network Nurse (1968) aka Television Nurse
- Sinister Love (1968)
- To Shadow Our Love (1968)
- Cruise Ship Nurse (1969)
- Nurse Paula (1969)
- Resort Nurse (1969)
- Department Store Nurse (1970)
- Mission for a Nurse (1970)

=== As Clarissa Ross ===
==== Single novels ====
- Durrell Towers (1965)
- Secret of the Pale Lover (1965)
- Face in the Pond (1967)
- Gemini in Darkness (1969)
- A Shadow on Capricorn (1970)
- Beware the Kindly Stranger (1970)
- Glimpse Into Terror (1970)
- Out of the Fog (1970)
- Whispers in the Night (1970)
- A Love to Cherish (1971)
- Corridors of Fear (1971)
- Shadow Over the Garden (1971)
- The Haunting of Villa Gabriel (1971)
- The Room Without a Key (1971)
- Voice from the Grave (1971)
- It Comes By Night (1972)
- Phantom of Glencourt (1972)
- The Ghosts of Grantmeer (1972)
- The Spectral Mist (1972)
- Jennifer By Moonlight (1973)
- China Shadow (1974)
- Drifthaven (1974)
- Moscow Mists (1977)
- The Jade Princess (1977)
- A Scandalous Affair (1977)
- Wine of Passion (1978)
- Kashmiri Passions (1978)
- Flame of Love (1978)
- Istanbul Nights (1978)
- Casablanca Intrigue (1979)
- Eternal Desire (1979)
- Denver's Lady (1980)
- Fan the Wanton Flame (1980)
- Only Make-Believe (1980)
- Venetian Moon (1980)
- Masquerade (1980)
- Satan Whispers (1981)
- Tangier Nights (1981)
- The Dancing Years (1982)
- Summer of the Shaman (1982)

==== Dark Harbor Series ====
1. Ghost of Dark Harbor (1974)
2. A Hearse for Dark Harbor (1974)
3. Mists of Dark Harbor (1975)
4. Dark Harbor Haunting (1975)
5. Terror at Dark Harbor (1975)
6. Evil of Dark Harbor (1975)

=== As Marilyn Ross ===
==== Single novels ====
- Beware My Love! (1965)
- Decision for Nurse Baldwin = Jill Baldwin, Registered Nurse (1965)
- The Locked Corridor (1965)
- A Gathering of Evil (1966)
- Dark Legend (1966)
- Desperate Heiress (1966)
- Memory of Evil (1966)
- Mistress of Ravenswood (1966)
- Phantom Manor (1966)
- Satan's Rock (1966)
- Tread Softly, Nurse Scott! (1966)
- Assignment: Danger (1967)
- Cameron Castle (1967)
- Shorecliff (1968)
- Message from a Ghost (1971)
- Witches' Cove (1971)
- The Aquarius Curse(1971)
- Dark Stars Over Seacrest (1972)
- Mistress of Moorwood Manor (1972)
- Night of the Phantom (1972)
- Phantom of the Swamp (1972)
- The Long Night of Fear (1972)
- The Sinister Garden (1972)
- The Witch of Bralhaven (1972)
- Behind the Purple Veil (1973)
- Don't Look Behind You (1973)
- Face in the Fog (1973)
- House of Ghosts (1973)
- Secrets of Sedbury Manor (1973)
- Step Into Terror (1973)
- The Devil's Daughter (1973)
- The Phantom of Belle Acres (1973)
- Marta (1973)
- Face in the Shadows (1973)
- Garden of Ghosts (1974)
- Loch Sinister (1974)
- Terror at Marbury Hall (1974)
- The Vampire Contessa from the Journal of Jeremy Quentain (1974)
- Phantom of the 13th Floor (1975)
- The Amethyst Tears (1975)
- The Ghost and the Garnet (1975)
- Shadow Over Emerald Castle (1975)
- Ravenhurst (1975)
- Satan's Island (1975)
- Phantom Wedding (1976)
- Shadow Over Denby (1976)
- The Haiti Circle (1976)
- The Widows of Westwood (1976)
- Delta Flame (1978)
- Pleasure's Daughter (1978)
- Passion Cargo (1979)
- Beloved Adversary (1981)
- Fortune's Mistress (1981)
- Forbidden Flame (1982)
- Shadows Over Briarcliff (1986)
- Castle Malice (1986)

==== Dark Shadows Series ====
Dark Shadows by Marilyn Ross

1. Dark Shadows (1966)
2. Victoria Winters (1967)
3. Strangers at Collins House (1967)
4. The Mystery of Collinwood (1968)
5. The Curse of Collinwood (1968)
6. Barnabas Collins (1968)
7. The Secret of Barnabas Collins (1969)
8. The Demon of Barnabas Collins (1969)
9. The Foe of Barnabas Collins (1969)
10. The Phantom and Barnabas Collins (1969)
11. Barnabas Collins Versus the Warlock (1969)
12. The Peril of Barnabas Collins (1969)
13. Barnabas Collins and the Mysterious Ghost (1970)
14. Barnabas Collins and Quentin's Demon (1970)
15. Barnabas Collins and the Gypsy Witch (1970)
16. Barnabas, Quentin, and the Mummy's Curse (1970)
17. Barnabas, Quentin, and the Avenging Ghost (1970)
18. Barnabas, Quentin, and the Nightmare Assassin (1970)
19. Barnabas, Quentin, and the Crystal Coffin (1970)
20. Barnabas, Quentin, and the Witch's Curse (1970)
21. Barnabas, Quentin, and the Haunted Cave (1970)
22. Barnabas, Quentin, and the Frightened Bride (1970)
23. Barnabas, Quentin, and the Scorpio Curse (1970)
24. Barnabas, Quentin, and the Serpent (1970)
25. Barnabas, Quentin, and the Magic Potion (1971)
26. Barnabas, Quentin, and the Body Snatchers (1971)
27. Barnabas, Quentin, and Dr. Jekyll's Son (1971)
28. Barnabas, Quentin, and the Grave Robbers (1971)
29. Barnabas, Quentin, and the Sea Ghost (1971)
30. Barnabas, Quentin, and the Mad Magician (1971)
31. Barnabas, Quentin, and the Hidden Tomb (1971)
32. Barnabas, Quentin, and the Vampire Beauty (1972)

==== Fog Island Series ====
1. Haunting of Fog Island (1965)
2. Fog Island (1965)
3. Phantom of Fog Island (1971)
- Dark Towers of Fog Island (1975)
- Fog Island Secret (1975)
- Ghost Ship of Fog Island (1975)
- Fog Island Horror (1978)

==== The Stewarts of Stormhaven Series ====
1. Curse of Black Charlie (1976)
2. Cellars of the Dead (1976)
3. Waiting in the Shadows (1976)
4. Death's Dark Music (1977)
5. Cauldron of Evil (1977)
6. This Evil Village (1977)
7. Phantom of the Snow (1977)
8. Mask of Evil (1977)
9. This Frightened Lady (1977)
10. The Twice Dead! (1978)
11. Awake to Terror (1978)
12. Dead of Winter (1978)

==== Birthstone Gothic ====
- The Ghost and the Garnet (1975)
- The Amethyst Tears (1975)
- Shadow Over Emerald Castle (1975)

==== Ballantine Zodiac Gothic ====
- Temple of Darkness (1976)

==== Berkley Zodiac Gothic ====
- The Brides of Saturn (1976)

=== As Jan Daniels ===
==== Single novels ====
- Bride for Arundel (1966)
- So Strange My Love (1966)

=== As Charlotte McCormack ===
==== Single novels ====
- Willow Lodge (1966)
- The Uneasy Heart (1967)

=== As Ruth Dorset ===
==== Single novels ====
- Front Office Nurse (1966)
- Hotel Nurse (1967)
- Nurse in Waiting (1967)
- Nurse Paula = Nurse Paula's Dilemma (1968)
- Behind Hospital Walls (1970)
- Head Nurse (1970)
- Surgical Nurse (1970)
- The Nurse Takes a Chance (1970)

=== As Miriam Leslie ===
==== Single novels ====
- Cavanaugh Keep (1968)

=== As Tex Steele ===
==== Single novels ====
- The Black Riders (1968)
- Vengeance Spur (1968)
- Texas Rebellion (1969)

=== As Dana Ross ===
==== Single novels ====
- The Figure in the Shadows (1971)
- The Haunting of Clifton Court (1972)
- Night of the Dead (1973)
- Demon of the Darkness (1975)
- This Shrouded Night (1975)
- Lodge Sinister (1975)
- The Raven and the Phantom (1976)

=== As Laura Frances Brooks ===
==== Single novels ====
- This Old, Evil House (1975)

=== As Lydia Colby ===
==== Single novels ====
- The Touch of Evil (1977)

=== As Diana Randall ===
==== Single novels ====
- Dragon Lover (1981)

=== As Marilyn Carter ===
==== Single novels ====
- The Reluctant Debutante (1987)
