= The Living Corpse (novel) =

1838 novel by Vladimir Odoyevsky

The Living Corpse (Russian: Живой труп) is a Gothic short story written by Vladimir Odoyevsky in 1838 and published in 1844.

Written in the first person, it tells the story of Vasilii Kuzmich Aristidov, who wakes up one morning to find himself a ghost. A work of social satire, the short story can be read on several levels and is considered a vehicle for Odoyevsky's own philosophical ideas.
