= Miloš Urban =

Czech author and translator

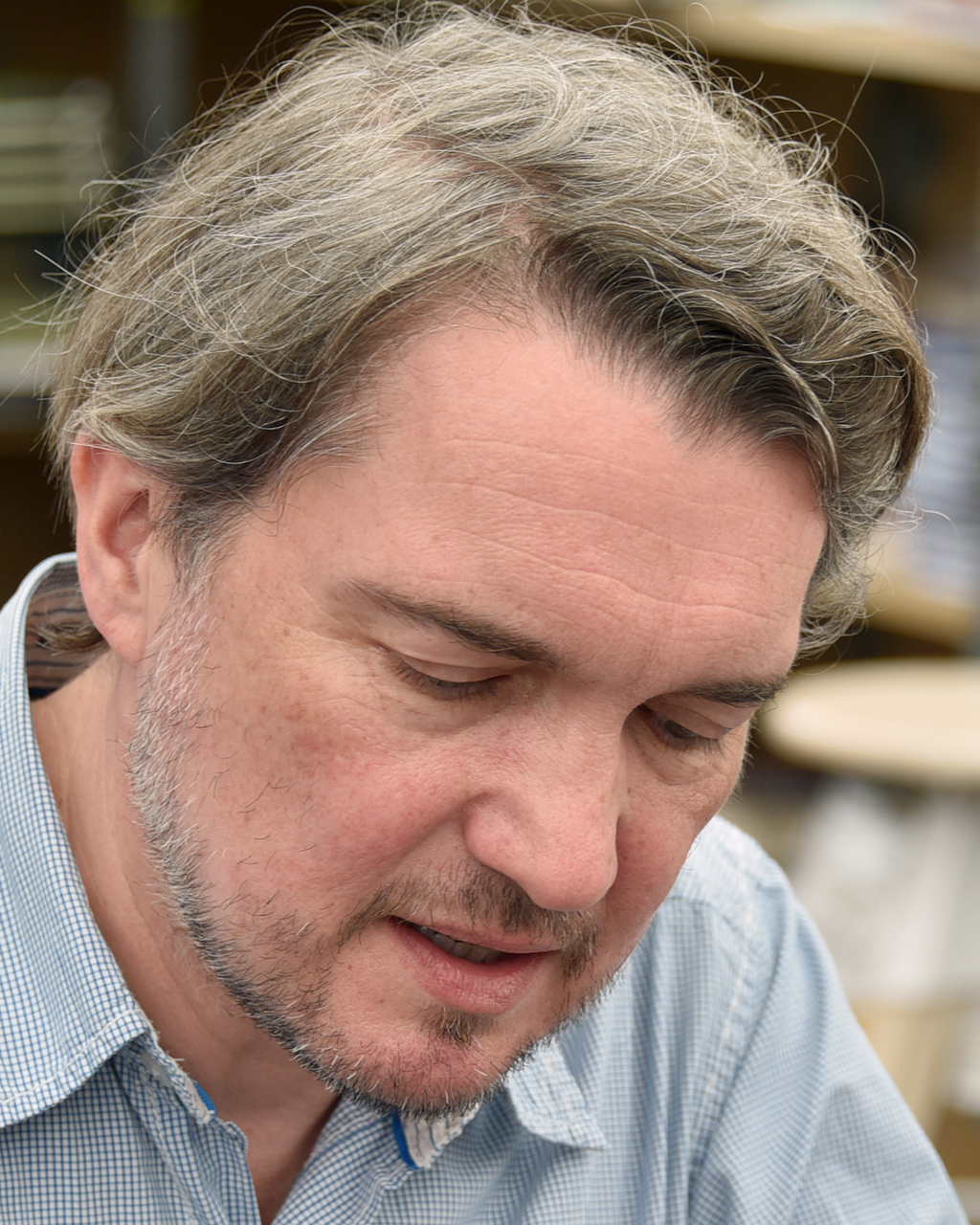
Miloš Urban (2019)

Miloš Urban (born 4 October 1967 in Sokolov, Czechoslovakia) is a Czech novelist and horror writer, known as the "dark knight of Czech literature". He is best known for his 1999 novel Sedmikostelí, a Gothic crime horror set in Prague, which was translated into 11 languages. He is also a translator, and has translated works by authors including Isaac Bashevis Singer and Julian Barnes into Czech. He was the winner of the 2002 Magnesia Litera prize for prose writing for his 2001 novel Hastrman, as well as the 1996 Mladá fronta prize for his translation of Barnes' Flaubert's Parrot. As well as the Czech Republic, Urban's books have found considerable commercial success in Spanish-speaking countries.

== Early life ==
Urban was born in Sokolov in 1967 and grew up in Bohemia. He spent a part of his childhood living in the Czechoslovak embassy in London before moving back to Prague to study Nordic and English Studies at the Faculty of Arts of Charles University, which included a year studying abroad at Oxford University. After graduating he worked as an editor for Mladá fronta, then as editor-in-chief for Argo, the publishing house which later released his books. In 1996 Urban won the Mladá fronta Prize for his translation of Flaubert's Parrot by British writer Julian Barnes.

== Literary career ==
Urban's first novel was The Final Mark on the Manuscripts, released in 1998, a mockumentary novel released under the pseudonym "Josef Urban", also the name of the novel's narrator. The book's plot revolves around the manuscripts of Dvůr Králové and of Zelená Hora. It was positively received and later re-issued by Argo in 2005 under Urban's real name.

Later the same year, Urban released his best-known work, The Seven Churches, (Czech: Sedmikostelí), a Gothic historical thriller set in New Town, Prague, about a man named Kvetoslav Svach, and how he is linked to murders in seven cathedrals of the city. It has been acclaimed as a masterpiece of modern gothic literature; Urban was praised as "the dark knight of Czech literature" and the book has been translated into 11 languages (English, German, French, Dutch, Hungarian, Russian, Spanish, Slovene, Croatian, Polish, and Bulgarian). The Seven Churches was the first of a loose trilogy known as the "church trilogy".

Hastrman came out in 2001. The novel received the Magnesia Litera Award for prose writing, and has been translated into Hungarian. A film based on the novel was produced in 2018. It is a controversial, uncompromising story combining motifs from Czech myths and folktales with the issue of ecology. Urban follows the story of a water-goblin through several centuries to create a parable for the environmental damage caused by humans. This book was followed the following year by Memoirs of an MP, the so-called "sexy novel" and a considerable departure from Urban's previous books, which was described as "the most searing, most bizarre and most anarchistic condemnation of democratic totalitarianism".

Urban next returned to the final two books of the "church trilogy": Shadow of the Cathedral (2003), which sold out within two weeks of its release, and Santini's Language (2005), which drew comparisons to Dan Brown. In 2007 Urban released Fields and Palisades: The Myth of the Princess and the Farmer, a version of the story of Přemysl the Ploughman and Libuše, the legendary origin story of the Czech people, as part of the Canongate Myth Series. This was followed by 2008's Dead Girls, an anthology of gothic mysteries written between 2002 and 2006. A review in Czech daily Právo said that "Urban writes wonderful gothic mystery stories – and even Jakub Arbes might envy him this collection". Lord Mord, released the same year, is set amid the slum clearance of Prague in the late 19th century, in which the murder of prostitutes is employed as an allegory for the harm caused to the city.

In 2011 Urban released Boletus arcanus, a satire about drug dependency and human need that references the Czech pastime of mushroom picking. Praga Picolla, released the following year, is a more traditional historical novel set in the time of the First Czechoslovak Republic. This was followed in 2014 by She Came From The Sea, a detective mystery about a girl who emerges from the sea on the British coast one day without explanation. In 2015, Urban released Urbo Kune, a sci-fi tinged novel written as a response to a request from Vienna architect, Jan Tabor, for European artists and writers to join a project dedicated to a united Europe.

== Personal life ==
As of 2009, Urban lived in the Bohnice district of Prague. He works as a writer, translator, and editor in a publishing house.

== Works ==
- The Final Mark on the Manuscripts (Czech: Poslední tečka za rukopisy; Argo, 1998)
- The Seven Churches (Czech: Sedmikostelí; Argo, 1998)
- Hastrman (Argo, 2001) - also known as The Water-Goblin
- Memoirs of an MP (Czech: Paměti poslance parlamentu; Argo, 2002)
- The Shadow of the Cathedral (Czech: Stín katedrály; Argo, 2003)
- Santini's Language (Czech: Santiniho jazyk; Argo, 2005)
- Fields and Palisades: The Myth of the Princess and the Farmer (Czech: Pole a palisáda: Mýtus o kněžně a sedlákovi; Argo, 2007)
- Dead Girls (Czech: Mrtvý holky; Argo, 2008) - a short story anthology
- Lord Mord (Argo, 2008)
- Boletus arcanus (Argo, 2011)
- Praga picolla (Argo, 2012)
- She Came from the Sea (Czech: Přišla z moře; Argo, 2014)
- Urbo Kune (Argo, 2015)
