= Faddei Bulgarin =

Russian writer, journalist and publisher

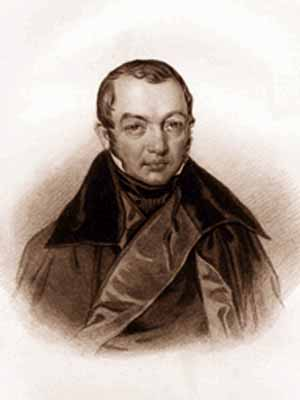
Faddei Bulgarin

Faddei Venediktovich Bulgarin (Russian: Фаддей Венедиктович Булгарин; 5 July [O.S. 24 June] 1789 – 13 September [O.S. 1 September] 1859), born Jan Tadeusz Krzysztof Bułharyn, was a Russian writer, journalist and publisher of Polish ancestry. In addition to his newspaper work, he rejuvenated the Russian novel, and published the first theatrical almanac in Russian. During his life, his novels were translated and published in English, French, German, Swedish, Polish, and Czech. He served as a soldier under Napoleon, and in later life as an agent of the Czar's secret police.

== Origins ==
Bulgarin was born in the Grand Duchy of Lithuania, then part of the Polish–Lithuanian Commonwealth, to a noble family in the Pereszewo manor, Minsk Voivodeship (near the modern village of Pyrašava, Belarus), as a son of Benedykt and Aniela née Buczyńska. He came from a noble family with Lithuanian Tatar roots of the Bułat coat of arms. He received his name in honor of Tadeusz Kościuszko. According to some reports, his father Benedykt subsequently participated in the uprising of 1794 and was exiled to Siberia for killing the Russian general Voronov; according to others, he was only suspected of participating in the liberation movement and was arrested in 1796, but released already at the beginning of 1797.

Bulgarin's childhood passed on the estates of Makovishchi near Hlusk, Vysokaye in the Orsha district, Rusanavichy in the Minsk district, Minsk and Nesvizh. From there, Bulgarin went with his mother as a child to Saint Petersburg, where he joined the cadet corps in 1798–1806. While studying, he began to write fairy tales and satires. He knew Russian poorly and at first he studied with difficulty and was ridiculed by the cadets, but gradually took root in the corps, under the influence of the corps literary traditions he began to compose fables and satires, and subsequently wrote a very flattering review of his history teacher G. V. Gerakov.

== Biography ==
=== Napoleonic Wars ===
In 1806, Bulgarin became a cornet in the Grand Duke Konstantin Pavlovich's Uhlan Regiment and immediately went on a campaign against the French. He was wounded in the Battle of Friedland and decorated for this battle. He was awarded the Order of Saint Anna, 3rd class. His long-term journal colleague Grech reports:

Although later he told me about his heroic deeds, but, according to his then colleagues, courage was not among his virtues: often, when a battle was hatching, he tried to be on duty at the stable. However, he was severely wounded in the stomach at Friedland.

He participated in the Finnish War that was fought between the Russian Empire and the Kingdom of Sweden. For one of the satires on the chief of the regiment, Grand Duke Konstantin Pavlovich, he spent several months under arrest in the Kronstadt Fortress. He was sent to the Yamburg Dragoon Regiment, but did not get along here either. Due to some scandalous story on a "romantic lining", he was regarded poorly. For writing satires, he was discharged with the rank of lieutenant from the Imperial Russian Army in 1811.

Having lost his service, Bulgarin found himself without money, toiled for some time, and then went to the Duchy of Warsaw. There he entered its army that was created by Napoleon – after the Peace of Tilsit (1807), France was an ally of the Russian Empire. As part of the Legion of the Vistula, he fought in Spain during the Peninsular War. In 1812, he fought in the campaign of 1812 against Russia in the Duchy's 8th Uhlan Regiment, part of Marshal Oudinot's II Corps. For his actions during the campaign of 1812, he was awarded the 5th Class Legion of Honour and promoted to the rank of captain.

According to one account, he was captured by Russian troops in 1812 during the Battle of Berezina. Another source writes that Bulgarin was in the battles of Bautzen and Kulm in 1813 and that he surrendered to the Prussian troops in 1814 and was then extradited to Russia.

== Publishing and literary activities ==
From 1816 he lived in Saint Petersburg, the capital of the Russian Empire, and then in Vilnius. He managed the nearby family estate and published, initially anonymously, in Polish-language magazines published in Vilnius: Dziennik Wileński, Tygodnik Wileński, Wiadomości Brukowe.

He significantly developed his literary and publishing activities in Saint Petersburg, where he went in 1819 and made friends with the leading local writers. He worked in the personal office of the Emperor of Russia. It is known that he held a pro-court position in his literary activity; he was a censor and informer of the imperial police. He helped Adam Mickiewicz escape from Russia. He was one of the top Russian conservatives.

In 1820, Bulgarin travelled from Warsaw to St. Petersburg, where he published a critical review of Polish literature and started editing The Northern Archive. He also made friends with the playwright Alexander Griboyedov and the philologist Nikolay Gretsch. The latter helped him to edit the newspaper Northern Bee (1825–1839), the literary journal Fatherland's Son (1825–1859), and other reactionary periodicals.

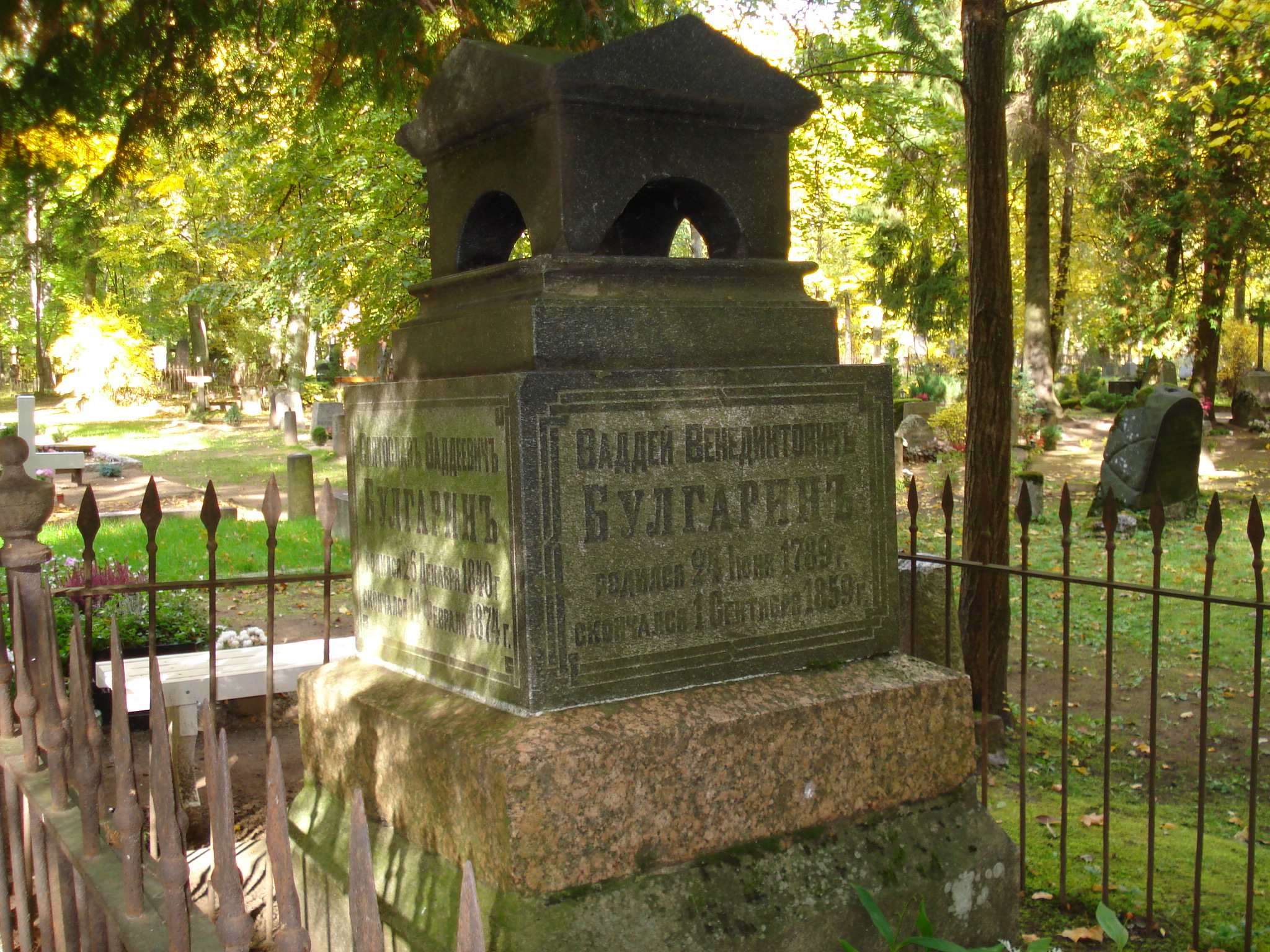
Bulgarin's tomb in Tartu

Bulgarin's unscrupulous manners made him the most odious journalist in the Russian Empire. The leading Russian poets Alexander Pushkin and Mikhail Lermontov devoted critical epigrams to Bulgarin. Alexander Pushkin, in particular, ridiculed him in a number of epigrams, written in Moscow magazine Telescop as well. Pushkin was changing his name to Figlyarin (from a Russian word for "clown") in one of the epigrams called Vidok Figlyarin. In turn, Bulgarin intensively criticized Pushkin in his works. Bulgarin retorted with epigrams, in which Pushkin's name was rendered as Chushkin (from the Russian word for "nonsense").

=== Books ===
Inspired by Sir Walter Scott, Bulgarin wrote the Vejeeghen (Vyzhigin) series of historical novels, which used to be popular in Russia and abroad. He followed these with two sententious novels Dmitry the Pretender (1830), about the False Dmitry I, and Mazepa (1834) about Ivan Mazepa. In 1837 he published under his own name a lengthy description of Imperial Russia, although much of the work was actually by Nikolai Alexeyevich Ivanov, then a Ph.D. student at Dorpat University.

Some of Bulgarin's stories are science fiction:

- Plausible Fantasies is a far future novel about the 29th century
- Improbable Fables is a fantastic voyage into hollow Earth
- Похождения Митрофанушки в Луне (The Adventures of Mitrofanushka in the Moon) (1837), a satirical fantasy novel.

=== Quotes and criticism ===
Bulgarin's biography always was subject of discussion among Russian society and especially among poets as he served in the Third Department under the rule of the Nicholas I. His friend and colleague Nikolay Gretsch wrote about him: "During his lifetime, some praised him, others tolerated him, some hated him, many argued and quarreled with him, but undoubtedly, no one ever slandered him—except in unpublished epigrams. It seems they feared his sharp, relentless pen. But after his death, he became the subject of universal malice and ridicule. People who wouldn't be fit to work as his janitors now curse and vilify him in the most merciless, shameless way."

== Death ==
After Nicholas I's death, Bulgarin retired from the department of stud farms, in which he had been serving for many years, and withdrew to his manor in Karlova (Karlowa in German) a suburb of Tartu at the time, but now incorporated within the city.

== Sources ==
- Piekarek, Stefan (1937). "Bułharyn Tadeusz". Polski Słownik Biograficzny (in Polish). Vol. 3: Brożek Jan – Chwalczewski Franciszek. Kraków: Polska Akademia Umiejętności.
- Arsenyev, A. A., ed. (1891). "Bulgarin (Faddei Venediktovich)" Булгарин (Фаддей Венедиктович). Brockhaus and Efron Encyclopedic Dictionary (in Russian). Vol. IVa: Bos — Bunchuk. Saint Petersburg. p. 895.
- Meshcheryakov, V. P.; Reinblatt, A. I. (1989). "Bulgarin Faddei (Tadeush) Venediktovich" Булгарин Фаддей (Тадеуш) Венедиктович. In Nikolaev, P. A. (ed.). Russkie pisateli, 1800–1917: Biograficheskii slovarʹ Русские писатели, 1800–1917: Биографический словарь (in Russian). Vol. 1: A-G. Moscow.
- Esin, B. I. (2000). Istoriia russkoi zhurnalistiki (1703–1917) История русской журналистики (1703–1917). Moscow: Nauka.
- Grech, Nikolai. "Chapter 12". Zapiski o moei zhizni Записки о моей жизни [Notes on my life].
