= Vladimir Odoyevsky =

Russian philosopher, writer, critic, philanthropist and pedagogue

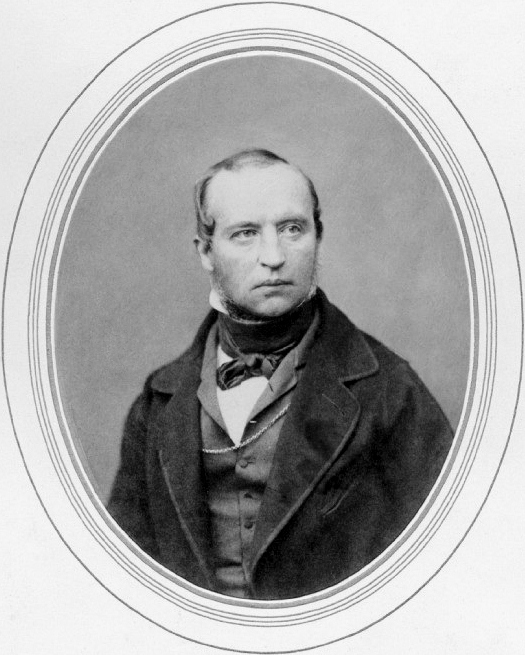
- Portrait by Levitsky, 1856
- Born: 11 August 1804; Moscow
- Died: 11 March 1869 (aged 64); Moscow
- Writing career
- Movement: Romanticism

Prince Vladimir Fyodorovich Odoyevsky (Russian: Влади́мир Фёдорович Одо́евский, [ɐˈdojɪfskʲɪj]; 11 August [O.S. 30 July] 1804 – 11 March [O.S. 27 February] 1869) was a Russian philosopher, writer, music critic, philanthropist, and pedagogue. He became known as the 'Russian Hoffmann' and even the 'Russian Faust' on account of his keen interest in phantasmagoric tales and musical criticism.

== Biography ==
The last member of the princely House of Odoyev, he was genealogically the most senior member of the House of Rurik. He was born to Prince Fyodor Sergeevich Odoyevsky (1771–1808), a state councillor (statsky sovietnik). His father began his career as an adjutant to Prince Grigory Potyomkin; in 1798 he entered civil service as the director of the Moscow Assignat Bank. According to one version, his mother, Ekaterina Alekseevna Filippova, was a serf; however, this version has since been disproven, and it was established that his mother was the daughter of a praporshchik. His widow, Avdotya Petrovna, owned a house on Prechistenka Street in Moscow, had several servants, and possessed a modest fortune inherited from her husband. His mother was a well‑educated young woman; she could speak French and play the piano. However, the Odoyevsky family regarded this marriage as a mésalliance. After his father's death in 1808, his mother remarried twice. Part of his childhood was spent with his grandfather, Colonel Prince Sergey Ivanovich Odoyevsky, but upon his grandfather's death, his estate in Kostroma Governorate fell into the hands of an acquaintance of Vladimir's maternal grandmother – the widow of a general, Agrafena Glazova – who took over the properties. In 1812, his mother's house in Moscow was burned down in a fire, and he and his mother lived on the estate of Drokovo in Ryazan Governorate, which she had taken over. While her son was away studying at a boarding school, in 1818–1819 she married Sub‑Poruchik Pavel Sechenov, and having given custody of her son to Agrafena Glazova, she settled at Drokovo with her new husband. P. Sechenov turned out to be an abusive husband. Vladimir eventually incurred considerable debts to Glazova, and after settling his liabilities, he moved to his grandfather's estate, being almost completely penniless.

Considered by his contemporaries to be a typical Muscovite, he was educated at the Nobility School of Moscow University from 1816 to 1822. In the mid‑1820s, Odoyevsky presided over the Lyubomudry Society, where he and his fellow students met to discuss the ideas of Friedrich Schelling and other German philosophers. At that time, he came to know many future Slavophiles and Westernizers, but refused to identify himself with any of these movements.

From 1824, Odoyevsky was active as a literary critic and journalist. In 1824, he and Wilhelm Küchelbecker founded the short‑lived Moscow literary magazine Mnemozina. In 1826, he moved to St Petersburg, where he joined the staff of the Imperial Public Library.

In the mid‑1830s, he co‑edited Sovremennik with Alexander Pushkin. Years later, he was put in charge of the Rumyantsev Museum. Odoyevsky finally returned to Moscow in 1861 but continued to serve as a senator until his death. He is buried in the necropolis of the Donskoy Monastery.

== Short stories ==
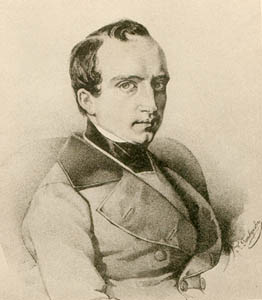
Odoevsky in the 1840s; lithograph by Kirill Gorbunov

Aspiring to imitate Ludwig Tieck and Novalis, Odoyevsky published a number of tales for children (e.g., 'The Snuff‑Box Town') and fantastical stories for adults (e.g., 'Cosmorama' and 'Salamandra'), imbued with the vague mysticism in the vein of Jakob Boehme and Louis Claude de Saint-Martin.

Following the success of Pushkin's The Queen of Spades, Odoyevsky wrote a number of similar stories on the dissipated life of the Russian aristocracy (e.g., Princess Mimi and Princess Zizi). On account of his many short stories from the 1820s and 1830s, Odoyevsky should be listed among the pioneers of the impressionistic short story in Europe.

His most mature book was the collection of essays and novellas entitled Russian Nights (1844). Loosely patterned after the Noctes Atticae, the book took two decades to complete. It contains some of Odoyevsky's best‑known fiction, including the dystopian novellas The Last Suicide and The Town with No Name. The stories are interlaced with philosophic conversations reminiscent of the French Encyclopedists.

== Musical criticism ==
As a music critic, Odoyevsky set out to propagate the national style of Mikhail Glinka and his followers, denigrating their forebears such as Dmitri Bortniansky. He also wrote a romanticised biography of the Russian violinist Ivan Khandoshkin, whose career he presented as having been thwarted by the malign influence of Italian musicians such as Giuseppe Sarti. Among his many articles on musical subjects, a treatise on old Russian church singing deserves particular attention, though he expressed a strong distaste for strochnoy (early Russian polyphonic) chant, stating: "No human ear could possibly bear the succession of seconds that are constantly to be encountered." Johann Sebastian Bach and Beethoven appear as characters in some of his novellas. Odoyevsky was active in the foundation of the Russian Musical Society, the Moscow Conservatory, and the St. Petersburg Conservatory.

== Technology ==
Odoyevsky took part in the development of electroplating technology, invented by Moritz von Jacobi in Russia. In 1844, Odoyevsky published a book, Galvanism Applied in Technology (Гальванизм в техническом применении). He conducted a number of experiments and developed a method for cobalt electroplating.

== Works ==
- The Year 4338: Petersburg Letters (1835)
- The Living Corpse (1844)

=== English translations ===
- Russian Nights (translated by Olga Koshansky-Olienikov and Ralph E. Matlaw) (collection of philosophical essays and novellas), [1965] 1997.
- "Princess Mimi" (translated by David Lowe), "The Sylph" (translated by Joel Stern), and "The Live Corpse" (translated by Neil Cornwell) (stories), from Russian Romantic Prose: An Anthology, Translation Press, 1979.
- The Salamander and Other Stories (stories, translated by Neil Cornwell), Gerald Duckworth, 1992.
- Two Princesses (novel, translated by Neil Cornwell), Hesperus Press, 2010.
- Two Days in the Life of the Terrestrial Globe and Other Stories (stories, translated by Neil Cornwell), Ama Classics, 2012.
