= The Forgotten Garden =

2008 novel by Kate Morton

- First edition cover
- Author: Kate Morton
- Language: English
- Publisher: Allen & Unwin
- Publication date: 1 July 2008
- Publication place: Australia
- Media type: Print (Hardbound)
- Pages: 552 pp.
- ISBN: 1-74114-998-3
- OCLC: 232979156

The Forgotten Garden is a 2008 novel written by Australian author Kate Morton, driven by the mystery of why a 4-year-old child is found abandoned on an Australian wharf in 1913.

While paying homage to Frances Hodgson Burnett, The Secret Garden and the Gothic novel, Morton's second work explores living with and overcoming loss - of trust, of identity, or of loved ones - and was inspired by Morton's own family history.

== Plot ==
At Nell's joyous 21st birthday party her world falls apart when her father tells her she was adopted as a 4-year-old in 1913, seemingly abandoned on an Australian wharf and unable to remember her name. The knowledge shatters her self-image and changes the course of her life.

In 1975, the only surviving clues to Nell's past are given to her after her father's death; the memories they trigger lead her to travel to England to unravel the puzzle, part of which is connected to the author of a rare fairytale book in her possession. She discovers her true identity despite having been thought dead for more than 60 years, and finds her way to Tregenna, and Blackhurst Manor, on the coast of Cornwall.

However, her plans to complete the quest are interrupted when her granddaughter Cassandra comes to stay "temporarily," a stay that becomes permanent. In the end it is Cassandra, haunted by her own griefs, who in 2005 follows in Nell's footsteps to finish the journey of discovery and fit together all the missing pieces.

== Major themes/style ==
Major themes and subject tags for this novel include: abandoned children, Australia, country homes, England, Cornwall, Inheritance and succession.

Kirkus describes this novel as "weighty" and "at times unwieldy." The plot is described as "intricate" with "intersecting narratives" and "heavy-handed fairy-tale symbolism."

The Forgotten Garden exhibits many of the Gothic conventions found in books like Jane Eyre and Wuthering Heights, most poignantly the dark and gloomy estate. There are also recognizable parallels between this novel and Frances Hodgson Burnett's The Secret Garden.

== Publication history ==
Published in the United States by Atria Books, April 2009, ISBN 978-1-4165-5054-9, hardback.

== Developmental history ==
Kate Morton drew on personal experiences as she wrote The Forgotten Garden. Morton's own grandmother, just like Nell, found out on her 21st birthday that she was not the biological daughter of her parents. It was a secret she kept until she confided in her three older daughters as an old woman, and this dark secret was one of the inspirations for her novel. Morton was also inspired by her own home, which sits on a Paddington hillside, and the mysterious Lost Gardens of Heligan in Cornwall. All of these elements are woven throughout her story.

== Reception ==
The Forgotten Garden has generally been received positively by critics and readers alike. Morton is described as having the "storyteller's touch," an author who has "supreme control of her material," and a "writer who is really getting into her stride." Her novel is described as a "beautifully written and satisfying novel," "another beautiful and compulsively readable romantic mystery."

== Awards and nominations ==
- Premiere Main Selection in France, December 2008
- Australian Book Industry Awards 2009: General Fiction Book of the Year
- New York Times Best Seller

== Other works ==
Morton's other published works include:

- The House at Riverton (The Shifting Fog)
- Miscellanea
- The Distant Hours
- The Secret Keeper
- The Lake House
- The Clockmaker's Daughter
