= French Revolution and the English Gothic Novel =

Historical influence on literature

The French Revolution greatly influenced the development of the English gothic novel.

In the early phase of the French Revolution, the British viewed developments favorably in the hopeful expectation that the French would establish a constitutional monarchy. But as the situation in France deteriorated into increased chaos and violence, "the dominant political mood in Britain ceased to be one of celebration and became, increasingly, one of fear instead." In 1790, English statesman Edmund Burke wrote that the French Revolution was, "the most astonishing that has hitherto happened to the world." English novelist Fanny Burney wrote that "There is nothing in old history that I shall any longer think fabulous; the destruction of the most wonderful empires on record has nothing more wonderful, nor of more sounding improbability, than the demolition of this great nation, which rises up against itself for its own ruin-perhaps annihilation."

"The popularity of Gothic fiction in the 1790s and well into the nineteenth century was due in part to the widespread anxieties and fears in Europe aroused by the turmoil in France finding a kind of catharsis in tales of darkness, confusion, blood, and horror." The Gothic novel, combining elements of terror, romance, and the supernatural, was one way for English writers to come to terms with what they considered to be astounding events, perceiving what happened to their neighbors in France and with the consequences upon their own society.

The gothic novel contains modes of nightmarish terror, violence, and sexual rapacity. These modes coincided with the mood and modes of violence brought forth during the French Revolution. In his 1800 essay "Idée sur les romans", the Marquis de Sade said that the bloody upheavals of the French Revolution had rendered everyday reality so horrific that contemporary writers necessarily had to invoke the supernatural and demonic realms for material that could still shock or startle their readers.

The upper echelon of English society mostly perceived the French Revolution as threatening to the status quo and stability of their accustomed lifestyle, and as a danger to their personal safety and social position. It has been suggested that the gothic novel with its themes of terror and violence gave English writers a safe expression of their anxieties about disruption and chaos. They also worked to uphold the political normalcy and traditional morals of the time. Examples of this can be seen in Anne Radcliffe's female characters being submissive and incapable of making their own decisions, upholding traditional values of a patriarchal society.

Reformers William Godwin, Robert Bage, and others avoided the Gothic and theatrical trappings associated with the Revolution. Godwin's Things as They Are; or, The Adventures of Caleb Williams is classified as one of the best examples of the "victim-of-society story". Seamus Deane said that Godwin's use of the fantastic in the form of the gothic novel again let him write about the philosophy of the French Revolution without harsh backlash, because it was under the guise of the fantastic.

== Feminism ==
The dissent that occurred during the French Revolution was not only violent, it also led to women questioning their role in society and to a debate on the nature of women. This debate can be seen in one of the most famous gothic novels, Frankenstein by Mary Shelley. In her novel she engages in a discussion of women's nature by having a man with the power to create new life instead of the woman, and its consequences. Jane Austen also engaged in this discussion in her gothic novel Northanger Abbey. Catherine Morland, the protagonist of the novel, has to confront the workings of the political and economic system that involves women as chess pieces in marriages and of power relationships, after her visions of romance are over. In this novel one can also see how the mind can take a truth by means other than texts, many times removed from actual events.
