= The Distant Hours =

2010 novel by Kate Morton

First edition (publ. Allen & Unwin)

The Distant Hours is the third novel by Australian author Kate Morton. The hardback edition was published in the United Kingdom by Pan Macmillan in November 2010, the paperback was published in 2011. The Distant Hours was a Sunday Times Top Ten Bestseller in hardback.

== Synopsis ==
=== Part One ===
The book begins with arrival of a letter, sent during the Second World War, to a small house on Central London in 1992. Edith Burchill (Edie), a young woman working as an editor in a small family-run publishing firm, is visiting her mother Meredith when the letter arrives. Their relationship has never been close, and Edie is shocked by her mother's emotional reaction. She explains that as a child she was evacuated to Kent during the war. She was taken in by three sisters who lived in their grand, ancestral home of Milderhurst Castle.

Some months later, Edie is driving back from meeting a client and finds herself in the village of Milderhurst. She is immediately entranced by the castle, and remembers having been brought to the gates by her mother when she was very young. She discovers that Milderhurst Castle was the home of the author of her favourite childhood book, "The True History of the Mud Man", and that his youngest daughter was driven mad by being abandoned by her fiancé. She impulsively decides to stay the night and go for a tour of the castle the next day, led by one of the sisters.

The next day she meets the Sisters Blythe; Persephone (Percy), and Seraphina (Saffy), who are twins and daughters of Raymond's first wife, and Juniper, the youngest and daughter of his second wife. Juniper seems to be suffering from dementia, and the twins are very protective of her. She has throughout her life been subject to 'losing time', where she would black out and lose control of her actions. Percy takes Edie on a tour of the castle, showing her the library where the twins' mother Muriel was killed in a fire. When Percy leaves Edie alone to answer the telephone, she is met by Juniper wearing a very old and beautiful dress. Juniper calls her Meredith, and tells her that she's done something terrible. Edie is quickly escorted from the castle.

The story then cuts to 1941, where the twins (who are then in their thirties) are preparing for Juniper and a mysterious guest to arrive for dinner. Saffy realises that the man Juniper is bringing with her is her lover, a man called Thomas Cavill, and that Juniper is bringing him to announce their engagement. A storm starts to rage outside as they wait in the parlour. Juniper and Thomas are extremely late, and the twins are beginning to worry that they won't arrive, when there is a knock at the door.

=== Part Two ===
Edie decides to ask her mother more about her stay at Milderhurst Castle. When her mother refuses to speak about it Edie calls on her Aunt Rita, who finds a box of letters written by Meredith to her family while she was at Milderhurst. Before she can read them she has to rush to the hospital, where her father is being treated for a heart attack.

The story then cuts to the day of Meredith's evacuation in 1939, as she leaves her family and travels to Milderhurst. Percy is due at the town hall to collect an evacuee, but is distracted by hearing a rumour that her housekeeper, Lucy, is due to be married. She feels keenly betrayed, and loses several hours wandering in her own thoughts. In the end Juniper, who is known for acting irrationally and on her own agenda, picks Meredith out of the group of children who are left. Saffy is at home with their father, who refuses to leave his tower and is suffering from paranoid delusions of the Mud Man coming to kill him. Lucy comes to tell her of her engagement, and to announce her resignation.

=== Part Three ===
Due to his heart attack, Edie's father is unable to leave his bed. Her investigation of the Mud Man's origins piques his interest, and she begins reading the book to him. Having read all the letters Rita gave her, Edie gives the letters to her mother who is infuriated by the intrusion and the two haven't spoken properly since. In her investigations, Edie finds an advert placed by a Theo Cavill trying to find Thomas. She decides to speak to the Theo in the hopes of asking Thomas to explain what happened that night in 1941. Edie finds Theo in a nursing home, and he is excited to hear news about his brother. When she explains that she was hoping to get information from him instead, he is crestfallen, and tells her that Thomas has been missing since 1941. Theo goes on to say that he received a letter sometime later supposedly from Thomas, saying that he had eloped with another woman.

Back in 1939, Thomas is working as an English teacher. He has come to Kent to check on his students, of which his favourite is Meredith, and to make sure they are happy in their surrogate homes. He comes across the pool at the bottom of the Milderhurst Castle estate, and decides to take a swim. Juniper finds him there, and he is stunned by her. When Meredith arrives she explains that she is the happiest she has ever been at Milderhurst. Meredith is the last student he has to check on, and so he leaves Kent to prepare for his first tour of duty with the military.

Juniper is equally taken with Thomas. She and Meredith climb to the roof, where she watches him walk into the distance. She confides that her greatest fear is become like her father – trapped and delusional. From that point they become very close friends.

Edie's father is not as blind to the atmosphere as she believes, and tells her to patch things up with her mother. When Edie approaches Meredith, they discuss the letter from Juniper. Meredith didn't realise that Juniper had written to her after she had to leave Milderhurst, and had believed that her friend had forgotten about her.

Unexpectedly Edie is contacted by a publisher looking to publish a new edition of The Mud Man. Apparently the Sisters Blythe have demanded that she write the introduction, although she has no experience as a writer.

In 1940 the day of Lucy's wedding has arrived, and Percy attends against her better judgement. That afternoon Meredith's parents come to have tea with the sisters, and surprise Meredith by demanding she comes home. She refuses, and runs into the surrounding woods to force them to leave without her.

=== Part Four ===
Edie returns to Milderhurst to begin writing her introduction. Saffy suggests that she be allowed to view their father's notebooks, which have been kept locked up since he died. Percy is clearly uncomfortable but agrees.

Once again the story cuts to 1941. Tom has returned from his first tour of duty, and meets Meredith and Juniper unexpectedly in London. He and Juniper begin their relationship, keeping it secret from both of their families. By October they are engaged. He comes to Meredith to give her a book, The Last Days of Paris, a Journalist's Diary. He leaves to travel to Milderhurst and the fateful dinner before planning to re-join his regiment the next week.

Edie returns to the B&B in the village, the landlady confides that her mother was Lucy the housekeeper, and that she thinks Lucy was having an affair with Raymond. She blames this for the obvious coldness Percy has towards her. Edie arrives at the castle the next day, and finds Saffy waiting to talk to her. She is very keen to make Edie see that while Percy feels responsible for Juniper's madness and is painfully overprotective of her sisters and the castle, she is truly a good person. Percy takes Edie down to the muniment room where Raymond's papers are stored. To her horror, Edie finds a letter which suggests that he may have plagiarised the Mud Man. Deeply affected, she makes her way back to the farmhouse.

When she arrives at the castle the following day, Percy is waiting to take her to the tower where Raymond spent his final years. Here she explains that she wrote the letter Edie found. The inspiration for the Mud Man came from an incident that happened when they were children. Her mother was having an affair with an architect, Oliver Sykes. Raymond confronted them one night in the library, and attacked Oliver, causing the fire which led to Muriel's death. Saffy saw Oliver fall from the building into the moat, where he died. From then on she had nightmares about a man who climbed out of the moat to her window to steal her away, which Raymond wrote into his story. Percy had tried to convince him not to publish, to avoid the guilt and suffering he eventually succumbed to. She continues, eager to pass on the secret she has carried since Thomas' disappearance. She says that she killed Thomas by accident, taking him for an intruder when he approached the house in the storm.

When Edie eventually gets back to the B&B, the landlady is eager to show her love letters to her mother, which are signed 'R'. Edie realises they are in fact signed P – for Percy, which explains her coldness towards Lucy's wedding and her family. She is overwhelmed by all the new information, and wakes in the middle of the night. Through her window, she can see flames engulfing Milderhurst Castle.

=== Part Five ===
The story returns to the moment of the knock on the door in 1941. Saffy lets in Juniper, who is soaking wet, and can't remember how she got from the bus to the house. Thomas still has not arrived. When Saffy removes Juniper's coat, she is covered in blood and has to be sedated to keep her calm. Percy attempts to find and conceal the evidence of whatever Juniper has done along the road outside, while Saffy waits in the parlour. She takes one of the pills to calm her nerves, and has her childhood nightmare. Meanwhile, Thomas, who has been delayed by the weather and wartime transport, has finally arrived. With Percy out, there is no one to come to the door. He notices a window shutter has come loose in the room above, where Saffy is sleeping. He's eager to make a good impression, and climbs up to the window to attempt to fix it. Saffy, only experiencing her nightmare, thinks he is the Mud Man and strikes him with a wrench. Percy arrives back at the house to find him dead in the moat, and buries him in the pet cemetery on the grounds. Juniper watches Percy burying the body, and begins her descent into madness believing that she killed her fiancé.

In the epilogue it transpires that Juniper helped deliver a baby at the roadside that night, and so was covered in blood and traumatised when she arrived. Percy never told Saffy of her role in Thomas' death, and when her secrets had been released she drugged her sisters and set fire to the library.

== Main characters ==
Edith Burchill (Edie)	A young, bookish woman who works as an editor in a publishing firm. She eventually becomes obsessed with Milderhurst Castle and its occupants, and with discovering the secrets in her mother's past.
Meredith Baker	Edith's mother, who appears also as a young evacuee taken to Milderhurst during the war. She is emotionally distant from her daughter, though her younger self was expressive and vibrant. Her relationship with Juniper Blythe was particularly important to her, and her perceived betrayal.
Juniper Blythe	The youngest of the Blythe sisters, the daughter of Raymond's second wife Odette Silverman. She has a heart condition which caused periodic blackouts in times of stress or excitement. Brilliantly talented, her artistic temperament and singular outlook on life often made her the subject of gossip and rumour.
Seraphina (Saffy) Blythe	Saffy considers herself the submissive twin, always bending to Percy's much stronger opinions. She is very maternal and caring, and is particularly sensitive to Juniper.
Persephone (Percy) Blythe	Percy is constantly the dominant twin, and defines herself almost entirely by her ancestry and her love for the castle. Her strong sense of tradition and values underpins many of her decisions throughout the book.
Raymond Blythe	A distinguished author, and father to the sisters. In his later years, his guilt and paranoia caused him to believe the Mud Man was coming for him. He became completely reclusive, and never left his room in the top of the tower.
Thomas Cavill	A young English teacher who enlists during the war. He falls in love with Juniper, and is said to have caused her madness by eloping with another woman.
Lucy Middleton	The Blythe's housekeeper. She works at the castle for nearly 20 years before leaving to marry the man who looks after the clocks.

== Other works ==
Morton's other published works include:

- The Clockmaker's Daughter
- The House at Riverton (The Shifting Fog)
- Miscellanea
- The Forgotten Garden
- The Secret Keeper
- The Lake House
