= Irish Gothic literature =

Irish Gothic literature developed in the eighteenth and nineteenth centuries. Most of the writers were Anglo-Irish. The period from 1691 to 1800 was marked by the dominance of the Protestant Ascendancy, Anglo-Irish families of the Church of Ireland who controlled most of the land. The Irish Parliament, which was almost exclusively Protestant in composition, passed the Penal Laws, effectively disenfranchising the Catholic majority both politically and economically. This began to change with the Acts of Union 1800 and the concomitant abolition of the Irish Parliament. Following a vigorous campaign led by Irish lawyer Daniel O'Connell, Westminster passed the Roman Catholic Relief Act 1829 removing most of the disabilities imposed upon Catholics.

The Anglo-Irish community found itself in a liminal position. No longer able to rely on the British government to protect their interests, many leaned toward Irish nationalism, which itself was somewhat problematic given their minority status. This anxiety found voice in their literature.

== Background ==
The Irish Gothic novel developed in the eighteenth and nineteenth centuries, a period when the Anglo-Irish community found themselves viewed as neither sufficiently English by the English, nor sufficiently Irish by their Catholic countrymen. The Irish Gothic novel reflects an Irish Anglican response to historical conditions, and allegorized the concerns of a minority population who (rightly or wrongly) perceived themselves under threat from the native Catholics over whom they maintained a precarious control. The exercising or exorcising of repressed anxiety is a characteristic function of Gothic fiction. "Irish writers often turned to the Gothic for images and narratives which would enable them to find new ways of articulating a stable identity in the midst of tremendous change."

Early Irish Gothic fiction tended to present Catholics as the strange, if not diabolical Other. Later writers such as Joseph Sheridan Le Fanu explored postcolonial concerns regarding his own class by depicting them simultaneously as the causers of and sufferers from their own colonial misdeeds. This idea was broached by Irish Anglican priest Thomas Leland in his 1773 philosophical History of Ireland from the Invasion of Henry II, which was criticized by both Anglicans and Catholics.

Among the characteristics of Gothic literature are: gloomy settings, ruined castles, suspense, a past that will not stay in the past, and "the fires of lust ignited to precipitous extremes of peril".

== Anglo-Irish Authors ==
=== Regina Maria Roche ===
Regina Maria Roche (née Dalton) (1764–1845) was born in Waterford and lived in Dublin before moving to England after her marriage. Her 1798 Gothic novel Clermont "...is arguably the definitive text of the Gothic novel craze during the eighteenth and nineteenth centuries". A bestselling author in her own day, her reputation was later overshadowed by that of Ann Radcliffe, to whom she is often compared. While there are many similarities in their work, Roche takes her heroine out of the safe haven of an idyllic natural setting and sends her to the city.

=== Charles Maturin ===
Charles Maturin (1780–1824) was a curate of the Church of Ireland. His first three works were Gothic novels. He is best known for the novel Melmoth the Wanderer, which Devendra Varma described as "the crowning achievement of the Gothic Romance".

=== Sheridan Le Fanu ===
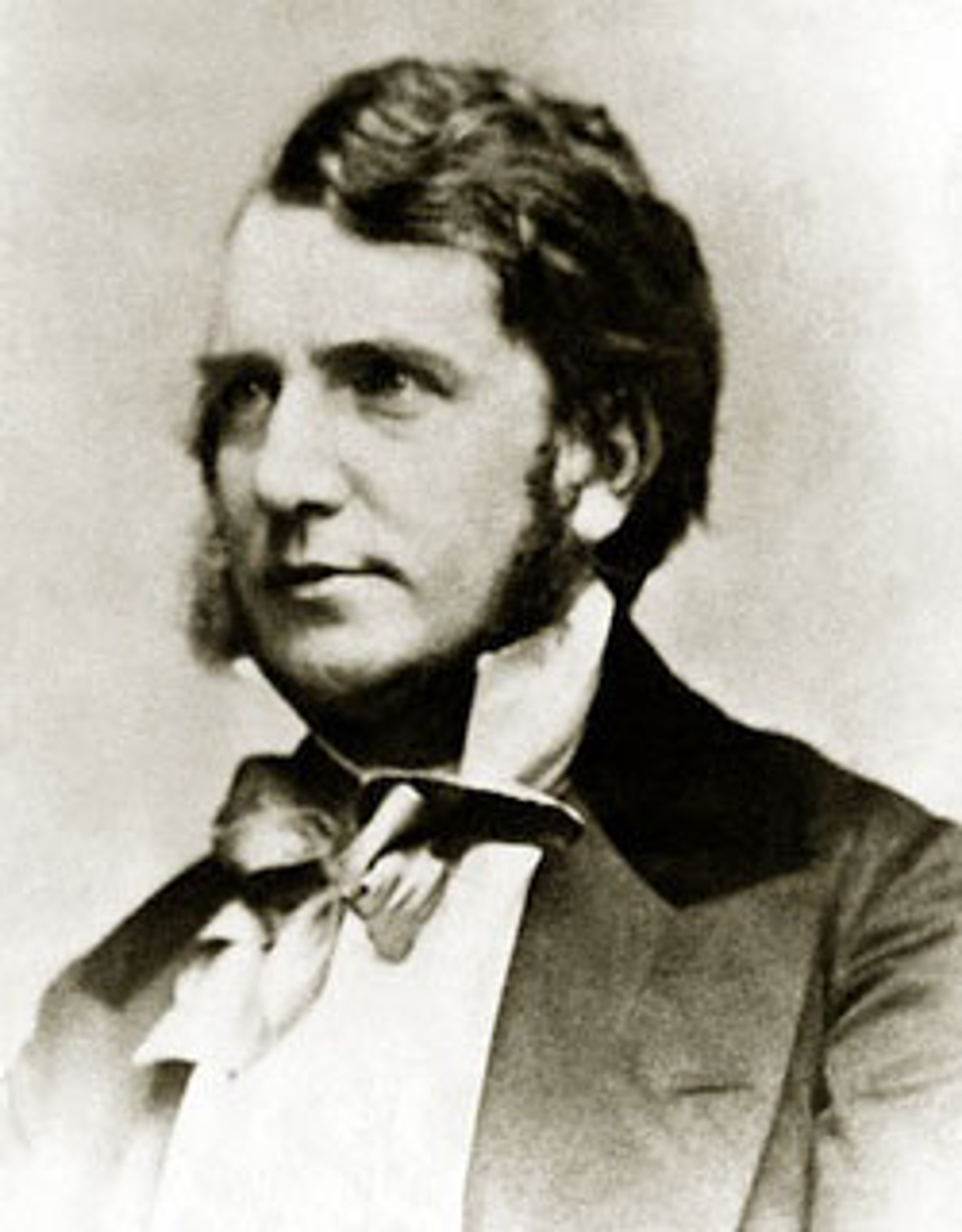
Sheridan Le Fanu

Sheridan Le Fanu (1814–1873) was a leading writer of ghost stories in the Victorian era. The son of a Dean of the Church of Ireland, as a teenager he experienced first-hand the disturbances of the Tithe War, a protest against the policy of enforcing tithes on the Roman Catholic majority for the upkeep of the Church of Ireland.

A meticulous craftsman, he turned Gothic's focus on external sources of horror to a combination of "psychological insight and supernatural terror". He specialised in tone rather than "shock effects" and often left important details unexplained and mysterious. The 1864 novel Uncle Silas "plays nostalgic variations on the themes of Ann Radcliffe and Charlotte Brontë as an innocent heroine is imperiled in the old dark house of her charismatic reprobate guardian, an uncle with designs on her inheritance".

=== Bram Stoker ===
Bram Stoker (1847–1912) was born on the northside of Dublin in "Black '47, the worst year of the Great Famine. He would later attribute his prolonged childhood illness to widespread contagion following the Famine. He became the theatre critic for the Dublin Evening Mail, which was co-owned by Sheridan Le Fanu. Le Fanu's 1872 Carmilla was an important influence on Stoker's Dracula. Stoker later became the personal assistant of actor Sir Henry Irving and business manager of London's Lyceum Theatre, which Irving owned.

Elizabeth Miller said that Dracula successfully combined folklore, legend, vampire fiction and the conventions of the Gothic novel. The ship that brought Dracula to Whitby with only the dead captain left, hands bound to the wheel, echoes the "Coffin ships" of the Famine era. The Land War of the early 1880s resonates with the Count traveling with coffins containing his native soil.

Stephen Arata sees the novel's cultural context as reflecting a "growing domestic unease" over the morality of imperial colonisation. Several critics have described Count Dracula in the context of an Anglo-Irish landlord, sucking the resources from the land.

=== Oscar Wilde ===
Oscar Wilde (1854–1900) was born on the southside of Dublin. He was the grand-nephew (by marriage) of Charles Maturin. His parents, Anglo-Irish intellectuals, often hosted salons at their home. Among those who attended were antiquary George Petrie, poet Samuel Ferguson and Sheridan Le Fanu. The Picture of Dorian Gray was Wilde's only novel. Published in 1890, Robert McCrum describes it as "an arresting, and slightly camp, exercise in late-Victorian gothic". The character Lord Henry Wotton serves as Mephistopheles.

== Catholic authors ==
=== Gerald Griffin ===
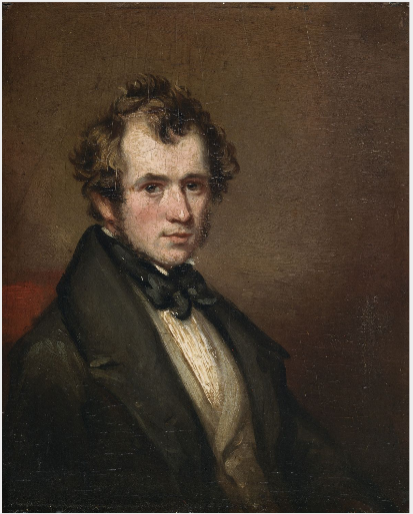
Portrait of Gerald Griffin

Gerald Griffin was born in Limerick. His father was a farmer who assisted the peasantry in the repression that followed the Irish Rebellion of 1798. At the age of nineteen, Gerald moved to London hoping to become a playwright, but ended up working in a publishing house. In 1827, he published Holland-Tide; or, Munster Popular Tales, a collection of seven short stories which was well received. In The Brown Man, the beautiful but poor Nora marries a strange man who is not what he purports to be. The Brown Man draws on both folklore and Gothic tropes. While Griffin's story may symbolize the oppression of Ireland by an exploitative, alien aristocratic class, Irish critic Sinéad Sturgeon suggests that it "...is equally suggestive of the interiorized Gothic landscape of a writer haunted by recurring worries of originality, plagiarism, and the inevitability of belatedness.

=== James Clarence Mangan (1803–49) ===
James Clarence Mangan was a poet born in Dublin.

=== William Carleton (1794–1869) ===
William Carleton was a novelist born in County Tyrone.
