= Kate Morton =

Australian author (born 1976)

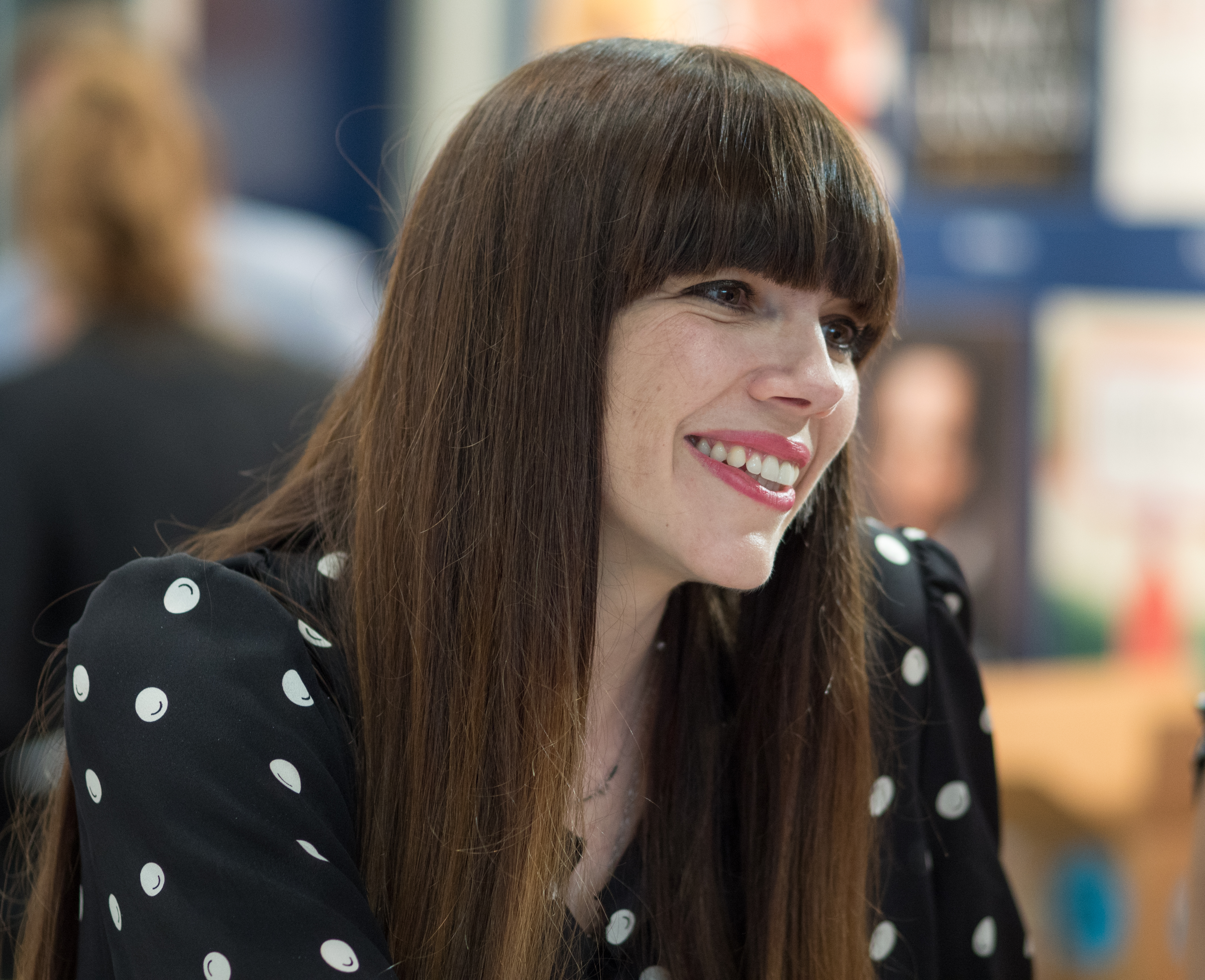
- Morton at BookExpo America in 2018
- Born: Berri, South Australia
- Education: Trinity College London; Royal Academy of Dramatic Art; University of Queensland
- Occupation: Author
- Spouse: Davin Patterson
- Writing career
- Years active: 2006–present
- Genres: General fiction
- Website: www.katemorton.com

Kate Morton is an Australian author. She is known for her best-selling novels, including The House at Riverton, The Forgotten Garden, and The Distant Hours. Her seventh book, Homecoming, was published in April 2023.

== Early life and education ==
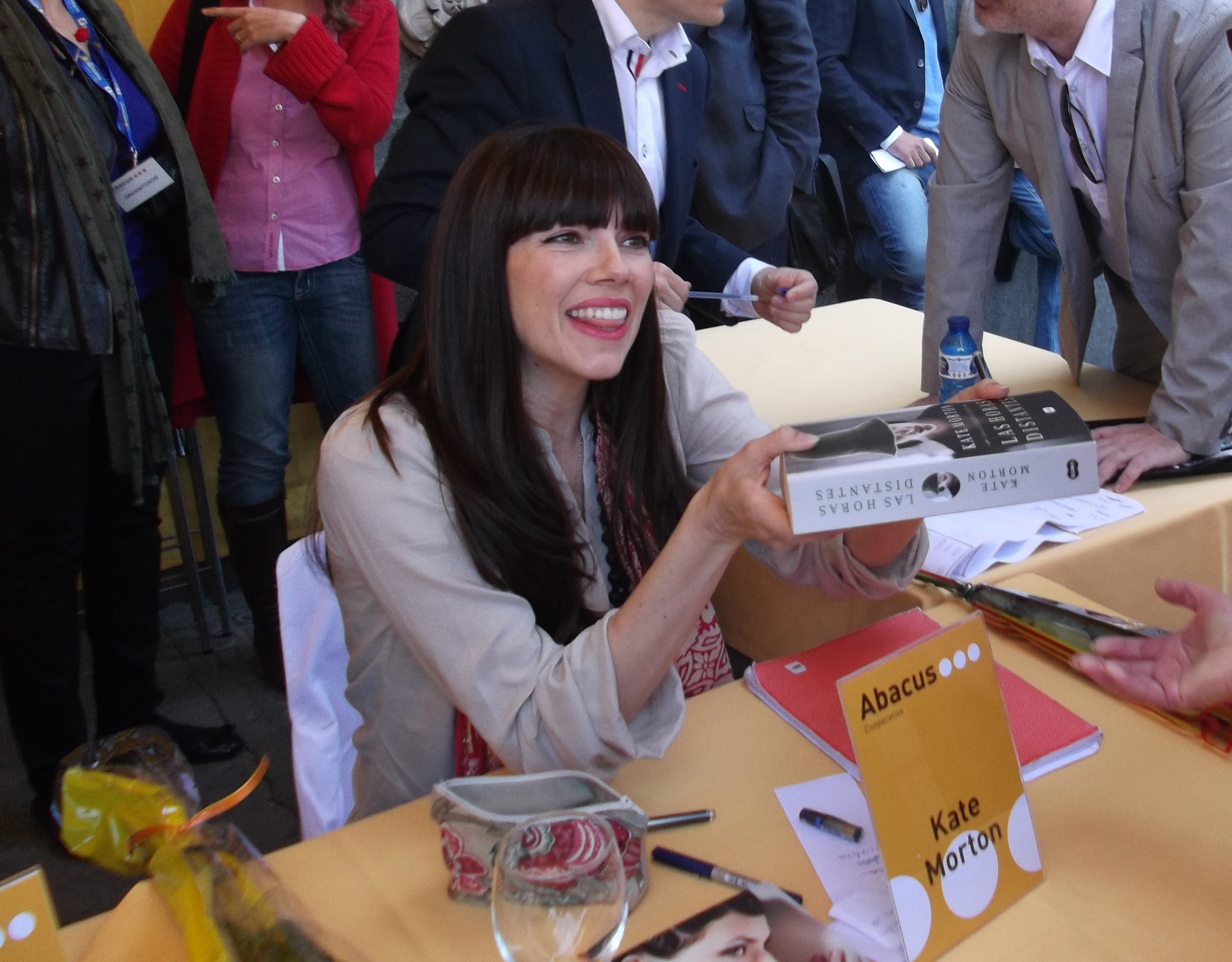
Morton at a book signing in Barcelona, April 2013

Morton is the oldest of three sisters. Her family moved several times before settling on Tamborine Mountain where she attended a small country school. She enjoyed reading books from an early age, her favourites being those by Enid Blyton.

She completed a Licentiate in Speech and in Drama from Trinity College London and then a summer Shakespeare course at the Royal Academy of Dramatic Art in London. Later she earned first-class honours in English Literature at the University of Queensland (1999) and won a scholarship to complete a master's degree focussing on tragedy in Victorian literature.

== Writing career ==
During her undergraduate studies she wrote two full-length manuscripts (which are unpublished) before writing The House at Riverton (The Shifting Fog), which was published in 2006.

Her first published novel, The House at Riverton, was listed on Richard and Judy's 2007 Summer Read list in the UK, and sold 63,128 copies in its first week. This made Morton the second biggest-selling author in the UK after JK Rowling.

As of October 2015, Morton had sold more than 16 million books in 42 countries, making her one of Australia's "biggest publishing exports".

== Novels ==
- The House at Riverton (2006; also known as The Shifting Fog) Sunday Times #1 bestseller, New York Times bestseller, Winner - Richard and Judy Best Read of the Year 2007, General Fiction Book of the Year at the 2007 Australian Book Industry Awards, and nominated for Most Popular Book at the British Book Awards in 2008. Sainsbury's Popular Fiction Award Best Novel nominee (2008), Nielsen Gold Book Award 2010, Golden Pan Award UK 1,000,000 copies sold, Indie Next Outstanding Debut Winter 2009.
- The Forgotten Garden (2008): New York Times bestseller, Sunday Times #1 bestseller, #1 bestseller Spain, Spiegel bestseller, winner of the ABIA General Fiction Book of the Year (2009), longlisted for the International IMPAC Dublin Literary Award (2010)
- The Distant Hours (2010): New York Times bestseller, #1 bestseller Spain, #1 bestseller Ireland Spiegel bestseller, commended in the Christina Stead Award, Fellowship of Australian Writers National Literary Awards (2010)
- The Secret Keeper (2012): Sunday Times bestseller, New York Times bestseller, Spiegel bestseller, El País bestseller, winner of the General Fiction Book of the Year, Australian Book Industry Awards (2013), winner of the Christina Stead Award, Fellowship of Australian Writers National Literary Awards (2012), winner of The Courier-Mail People's Choice Queensland Book of the Year (2013), finalist of the Best Translated Honkaku Mystery of the Decade (2010-2019).
- The Lake House (2015): New York Times bestseller, Sunday Times bestseller, #1 bestseller in Australia, #1 bestseller in Canada, Der Spiegel bestseller, El País bestseller.
- The Clockmaker's Daughter (2018): New York Times bestseller, Sunday Times bestseller, #1 bestseller in Australia, #1 bestseller in Canada
- Homecoming (April 2023)
- Christabel (2027)

== Personal life ==
Morton is married to Davin Patterson, a jazz musician and composer. They have three children and live in London.
