= The House at Riverton =

2007 novel by Kate Morton

- Author: Kate Morton
- Original title: Also released as The Shifting Fog
- Language: English language
- Genre: Novel
- Publisher: Pan Macmillan (UK)
- Publication date: 2007
- Publication place: Australia, United Kingdom
- Media type: Print (Hardback & Paperback)
- Followed by: The Forgotten Garden

The House at Riverton is the first novel by the Australian author Kate Morton, published in the United Kingdom by Pan Macmillan in June 2007.

It was selected as a "Summer Read" by the Richard & Judy Book Club, and was featured on Channel 4's Richard & Judy Show on Wednesday 18 July 2007. Subsequently, it was the 2007 winner of the Summer Read shortlist. It was also chosen for the First Look Book Club on Barnes & Noble before its release in the United States. An edition of the book was published by Allen & Unwin under the title of The Shifting Fog. It sold 63,218 copies in its first week of release in the United Kingdom.

== Plot ==
Ninety-eight-year-old Grace Bradley, a maid at Riverton Manor in the 1920s, has long hidden a terrible secret. A film is being made about a famous incident at Riverton when well-known poet Robbie Hunter shot himself. Contacted by the director, Ursula, as the only surviving person from that night, Grace decides to make a tape for her grandson, Marcus, sharing her secret with him.

As a young girl, Grace is sent to work at Riverton, first meeting the grandchildren of Riverton – David, Hannah and Emmeline – when they come to stay, and immediately feels a connection with them, Hannah in particular. It is later revealed that Grace is a half-sibling to the children. Though she suspects Hannah knows this, Grace does not say anything to her, and their relationship is strengthened by their many unsaid understandings about each other.

One Christmas, David brings home a school friend, Robbie Hunter, with whom eleven-year-old Emmeline is infatuated but fifteen-year-old Hannah is less impressed. Nearly ten years later, after David has been killed in WWI, Robbie finds Hannah to return a book she had given her brother. Hannah is living in London and unhappily married to an older businessman, and Robbie provides a glimpse of the life she wanted to have. They fall in love and begin an affair.

Emmeline, who has grown into a beautiful woman and one of the Bright Young People, prefers London society and often stays with Hannah, providing Robbie and Hannah the excuse they need to see each other, as Robbie ostensibly calls on Emmeline but is really slipping notes to Hannah with locations and times to meet.

Robbie is suffering shell-shock from the war, and wants to run away with Hannah and begin new lives together. She assists in planning their escape to appease him but does not believe they can elope, and is further convinced when her husband announces his plans to relocate them back to Riverton.

To celebrate the revival of Riverton, Hannah and her husband plan an extravagant midsummer gala. During the party, Grace goes to her room and finds two letters from Hannah. One addressed to Grace is in shorthand, which Hannah mistakenly believes Grace can read. Grace opens the second letter addressed to Emmeline, a suicide note saying that Hannah will have drowned herself in the lake by the time the letter is read.

Grace rushes to find Emmeline, and takes her to the lake. They find Hannah, who passes it off as a game when questioned. As Grace and Emmeline are about to return to the house, Robbie emerges from the newly built summerhouse, carrying a suitcase.

Emmeline thinks he has come to see her until it becomes apparent that he and Hannah are in love and running away together. Overcome with jealousy, Emmeline pulls out a handgun and threatens to shoot herself. Hannah wrestles the gun from her as fireworks go off around them, taking Robbie back to his time in the trenches, and he shouts at Hannah to shoot Emmeline before she ruins their plans. As Emmeline and Robbie rush toward her, Hannah shoots Robbie to save her sister. Hearing people approaching, Emmeline takes control, tells Grace to take Hannah's bags up to the house, and announces that Robbie has shot himself.

The police find no suspicious circumstances and Emmeline returns to London, continuing to enjoy the high life until she is killed in a car accident.

Growing depressed and distant, Hannah tells Grace that she knows Grace cannot read shorthand, the reason for which Grace does not know at the time. Hannah becomes pregnant, despite previous failures to conceive with her husband, and dies from complications during the birth. The baby, Florence, has Robbie's eyes, confirming her parentage, and is sent to live with Hannah's aunt in America.

Some years later, Grace learns the shorthand letter explained that Hannah and Robbie were planning to run away together, requiring Hannah to fake her death, hence the suicide note which Grace was to give to Emmeline after the party. Hannah planned to write Emmeline once settled somewhere. Having carried this guilt her entire life, and finally telling the truth via the tapes to her grandson, Grace is able to die in peace.

== Characters ==
In the past 1914–1924

- Grace Reeves
- Hannah Hartford
- Emmeline Hartford
- David Hartford
- Lord Ashbury
- Lady Ashbury/Lady Violet (inconsistency in title - she could not be both Lady Violet and Lady Ashbury)
- Major Jonathon
- Mr Frederick
- Robbie Hunter
- Theodore Luxton/Teddy
- Lady Jemima Hartford (sometimes incorrectly referred to as Mrs Hartford)
- Lady Clementine
- Fanny
- Deborah Luxton/Deb
- Nancy
- Mr Hamilton
- Mrs Townsend
- Myra
- Katie
- Alfred
- Mr Dawkins
- Mr Dudley

In the present 1999

- Grace Bradley (Reeves)
- Ruth
- Ursula
- Marcus
- Sylvia

== Awards ==
- 2007 Australian Book Industry Awards (ABIA) — Australian Newcomer of the Year, shortlisted
- 2007 Australian Book Industry Awards (ABIA) — Australian General Fiction Book of the Year, winner

== See also ==
- Ulysses (novel) mentioned as a banned publication that Robbie obtains for Hannah.
