= Joyce Carol Oates short fiction bibliography =

This is a list of short fiction works by the American author Joyce Carol Oates. This includes short stories, novellas, and plays, and is arranged chronologically by first publication.

== 1950s ==
=== 1956 ===
Title	Type	Originally published in	Collected in	Notes
"A Long Way Home"	short story	Will o' the Wisp: An Anthology of Original Writings (1956)	Uncollected	Anthologized in First Words (1993)

=== 1957 ===
Title	Type	Originally published in	Collected in	Notes
"Lament Cantabile"	short story	Syracuse Review (January 1957)	Uncollected	
"A Dawn You'll Never See"	short story	Literary Cavalcade (March 1957)	Uncollected	
"Synchronal"	short story	Syracuse Review (April 1957)	Uncollected	

=== 1958 ===
Title	Type	Originally published in	Collected in	Notes
"Rapport"	short story	Syracuse 10 (October 1958)	Uncollected	

=== 1959 ===
Title	Type	Originally published in	Collected in	Notes
"In the Old World"	short story	Syracuse 10 (March 1959)	Uncollected	Different story than in Mademoiselle
"In the Old World"	short story	Mademoiselle (August 1959)	By the North Gate (1963)	Different story than in Syracuse 10

== 1960s ==
=== 1960 ===
Title	Type	Originally published in	Collected in	Notes
"Sweet Love Remembered"	short story	Epoch (Spring 1960)	By the North Gate (1963)	Reprinted in Syracuse 10 (March 1960)

=== 1961 ===
Title	Type	Originally published in	Collected in	Notes
"A Legacy"	short story	Arizona Quarterly (Summer 1961)	By the North Gate (1963)	

=== 1962 ===
Title	Type	Originally published in	Collected in	Notes
"The Fine White Mist of Winter"	short story	The Literary Review (Spring 1962)	By the North Gate (1963)	Anthologized in Prize Stories 1963: The O. Henry Awards (1963) and The Best American Short Stories 1963 (1963); included in Where Are You Going, Where Have You Been?: Selected Early Stories (1993)

=== 1963 ===
Title	Type	Originally published in	Collected in	Notes
"Boys at a Picnic"	short story	By the North Gate (1963)	By the North Gate (1963)	Anthologized in The Modern Tradition: An Anthology of Short Stories, Third Edition (1976)
"By the North Gate"	short story	By the North Gate (1963)	By the North Gate (1963)	Anthologized in Envisioning the New Adam: Empathic Portraits of Men by American Women Writers (1995)
"The Census Taker"	short story	By the North Gate (1963)	By the North Gate (1963)	
"Ceremonies"	short story	By the North Gate (1963)	By the North Gate (1963)	Anthologized in Fourteen for Now: A Collection of Contemporary Stories (1969)
"Edge of the World"	short story	By the North Gate (1963)	By the North Gate (1963)	Included in Where Are You Going, Where Have You Been?: Selected Early Stories (1993)
"An Encounter with the Blind"	short story	By the North Gate (1963)	By the North Gate (1963)	
"The Expense of the Spirit"	short story	By the North Gate (1963)	By the North Gate (1963)	
"Images"	short story	By the North Gate (1963)	By the North Gate (1963)	
"Pastoral Blood"	short story	By the North Gate (1963)	By the North Gate (1963)	Included in Where Are You Going, Where Have You Been?: Stories of Young America (1974)
"Swamps"	short story	By the North Gate (1963)	By the North Gate (1963)	
"Stigmata"	short story	Colorado Quarterly (Spring 1963)	Upon the Sweeping Flood and Other Stories (1966)	Anthologized in Prize Stories 1964: The O. Henry Awards (1964) and Quest for Meaning: Modern Short Stories (1975)
"Upon the Sweeping Flood"	short story	Southwest Review (Spring 1963)	Upon the Sweeping Flood and Other Stories (1966)	Anthologized in The Best American Short Stories 1964 (1964) and five others; included in Where Are You Going, Where Have You Been?: Selected Early Stories (1993) and High Lonesome: New & Selected Stories (2006)

=== 1964 ===
Title	Type	Originally published in	Collected in	Notes
"The Death of Mrs. Sheer"	short story	MSS (1964)	Upon the Sweeping Flood and Other Stories (1966)	Included in Extenuating Circumstances: Stories of Crime and Suspense (2022)
"First Views of the Enemy"	short story	Prairie Schooner (Spring 1964)	Upon the Sweeping Flood and Other Stories (1966)	Anthologized in Prize Stories 1965: The O. Henry Awards (1965), The Best American Short Stories 1965 (1965) and two others; included in Where Are You Going, Where Have You Been?: Selected Early Stories (1993)
"The Survival of Childhood"	short story	Southwest Review (Spring 1964)	Upon the Sweeping Flood and Other Stories (1966)	
"Why Did You Cry for Me?"	short story	Cosmopolitan (July 1964)	Uncollected	
"The Psychoanalytical Love Affair"	short story	Cosmopolitan (September 1964)	Uncollected	

=== 1965 ===
Title	Type	Originally published in	Collected in	Notes
"The Stone House"	short story	Quarterly Review of Literature (1965)	The Seduction and Other Stories (1975)	
"Norman and the Killer"	short story	Southwest Review (Spring 1965)	Upon the Sweeping Flood and Other Stories (1966)	Anthologized in A Treasury of Modern Mysteries (1973) and The Web She Weaves: An Anthology of Mystery and Suspense Stories by Women (1983)
"Archways"	short story	Cosmopolitan (March 1965)	Upon the Sweeping Flood and Other Stories (1966)	
"At the Seminary"	short story	The Kenyon Review (Summer 1965)	Upon the Sweeping Flood and Other Stories (1966)	Included in Where Are You Going, Where Have You Been?: Selected Early Stories (1993) and High Lonesome: New & Selected Stories (2006)
"What Death with Love Should Have to Do"	short story	The Literary Review (Summer 1965)	Upon the Sweeping Flood and Other Stories (1966)	Included in Where Are You Going, Where Have You Been?: Selected Early Stories (1993)
"Assailant"	short story	Prairie Schooner (Winter 1965–66)	The Wheel of Love and Other Stories (1970)	

=== 1966 ===
Title	Type	Originally published in	Collected in	Notes
"A Garden of Earthly Delights"	short story	Shenandoah (Winter 1966)	Uncollected	Excerpt from A Garden of Earthly Delights (1967)
"Four Seasons"	short story	Virginia Quarterly Review (Winter 1966)	Uncollected	
"Dying"	short story	Transatlantic Review (Spring 1966)	Upon the Sweeping Flood and Other Stories (1966)	Anthologized in The American Literary Anthology 1 (1968)
"The Man That Turned Into a Statue"	short story	Upon the Sweeping Flood and Other Stories (1966)	Upon the Sweeping Flood and Other Stories (1966)	
"The Silent Child"	short story	Epoch (Spring 1966)	Uncollected	
"The Dying Child"	short story	Antioch Review (Summer 1966)	The Goddess and Other Women (1974)	
"In the Region of Ice"	short story	The Atlantic (August 1966)	The Wheel of Love and Other Stories (1970)	Anthologized in Prize Stories 1967: The O. Henry Awards (1967) and seven others; included in Where Are You Going, Where Have You Been?: Selected Early Stories (1993) and three others
"Gifts"	short story	The Kenyon Review (Fall 1966)	The Seduction and Other Stories (1975)	
"Joy Let Us Praise Thee"	short story	Southwest Review (Fall 1966)	Uncollected	
"Where Are You Going, Where Have You Been?"	short story	Epoch (Fall 1966)	The Wheel of Love and Other Stories (1970)	Reprinted in Argosy (March 1971); anthologized in The Best American Short Stories 1967 (1967) and over 40 others; included in Where Are You Going, Where Have You Been?: Selected Early Stories (1993) and four others
"The Thief"	short story	North American Review (September 1966)	Uncollected	

=== 1967 ===
Title	Type	Originally published in	Collected in	Notes
"Two Poets"	short story	Northwest Review (1967)	Uncollected	Reprinted in Northwest Review (1987)
"The Daughter"	short story	Epoch (Spring 1967)	The Goddess and Other Women (1974)	Original title "Childhood"; collected revised
"Four Summers"	short story	The Yale Review (Spring 1967)	The Wheel of Love and Other Stories (1970)	Anthologized in The American Literary Anthology 2 (1969) and Fiction 100: An Anthology of Short Stories (1978); included in Where Are You Going, Where Have You Been?: Selected Early Stories (1993), High Lonesome: New & Selected Stories (2006) and one other
"The Girl with the Beautiful Face"	short story	University Review (Spring 1967)	Uncollected	
"In the Warehouse"	short story	Transatlantic Review (Summer 1967)	The Goddess and Other Women (1974)	Included in Extenuating Circumstances: Stories of Crime and Suspense (2022)
"The Sweet Enemy"	short story	The Southern Review (Summer 1967)	Uncollected	
"The Voyage to Rosewood"	short story	Shenandoah (Summer 1967)	The Goddess and Other Women (1974)	
"The Way Back in from Out There"	short story	Southwest Review (Summer 1967)	Uncollected	
"A Love Story"	short story	Cosmopolitan (July 1967)	Uncollected	
"Sunday Dinner"	short story	TriQuarterly (Fall 1967)	Uncollected	Anthologized in Under 30: Fiction, Poetry and Criticism of the New American Writers (1969)
"The Wheel of Love"	short story	Esquire (October 1967)	The Wheel of Love and Other Stories (1970)	Anthologized in Love Stories (1975)

=== 1968 ===
Title	Type	Originally published in	Collected in	Notes
"The Heavy Sorrow of the Body"	short story	Northwest Review (1968)	The Wheel of Love and Other Stories (1970)	
"The Molesters"	short story	Quarterly Review of Literature (1968)	Where Are You Going, Where Have You Been?: Selected Early Stories (1993)	Excerpt from Expensive People (1968)
"A Lecture upon the Shadow"	short story	Southern Humanities Review (Winter 1968)	Uncollected	
"Prose and Poetry"	short story	Carleton Miscellany (Spring 1968)	Uncollected	
"Waiting"	short story	Epoch (Spring 1968)	The Goddess and Other Women (1974)	
"Adultery"	short story	Critic (April/May 1968)	Uncollected	Excerpt from Them (1969)
"Accomplished Desires"	short story	Esquire (May 1968)	The Wheel of Love and Other Stories (1970)	Anthologized in Prize Stories 1969: The O. Henry Awards (1969) and three others; included in Where Are You Going, Where Have You Been?: Selected Early Stories (1993) and two others
"Out of Place"	short story	Virginia Quarterly Review (Summer 1968)	The Seduction and Other Stories (1975)	
"Story of an Ordinary Girl"	short story	Texas Quarterly (Summer 1968)	Uncollected	
"The Woman Who Disappeared"	short story	University Review (Summer 1968)	Uncollected	
"Shame"	short story	The Atlantic (June 1968)	The Wheel of Love and Other Stories (1970)	
"All the Beautiful Women"	short story	The Saturday Evening Post (June 29, 1968)	Uncollected	
"Splendid Architecture"	short story	Antioch Review (Fall 1968)	The Seduction and Other Stories (1975)	
"By the River"	short story	December (December 1968)	Marriages and Infidelities (1972)	Anthologized in The Best American Short Stories 1969 (1969), Superfiction, or The American Story Transformed: An Anthology (1975) and 100 Years of the Best American Short Stories (2015); included in Where Are You Going, Where Have You Been?: Selected Early Stories (1993) and Extenuating Circumstances: Stories of Crime and Suspense (2022)
"A Far Country"	short story	Critic (December 1968/January 1969)	Uncollected	

=== 1969 ===
Title	Type	Originally published in	Collected in	Notes
"Matter & Energy"	short story	Partisan Review (1969)	The Wheel of Love and Other Stories (1970)	
"The Spiral"	short story	Shenandoah (Winter 1969)	Marriages and Infidelities (1972)	
"A Girl Worth Twenty Million"	short story	Cosmopolitan (February 1969)	Second Nature (2026)	Original title "A Girl Worth Two Million"; anthologized in Cosmopolitan's Winds of Love: Romantic & Erotic Tales (1975)
"An Interior Monologue"	short story	Esquire (February 1969)	The Wheel of Love and Other Stories (1970)	
"Boy and Girl"	short story	Prism International (Spring 1969)	The Wheel of Love and Other Stories (1970)	Anthologized in American Scenes: Contemporary Short Fiction (1978); included in Where Are You Going, Where Have You Been?: Stories of Young America (1974) and one other
"How I Contemplated the World from the Detroit House of Correction and Began My Life Over Again"	short story	TriQuarterly (Spring 1969)	The Wheel of Love and Other Stories (1970)	Anthologized in Prize Stories 1970: The O. Henry Awards (1970), The Best American Short Stories 1970 (1970) and eight others; included in Where Are You Going, Where Have You Been?: Selected Early Stories (1993), High Lonesome: New & Selected Stories (2006) and three others
"Unmailed, Unwritten Letters"	short story	The Hudson Review (Spring 1969)	The Wheel of Love and Other Stories (1970)	Anthologized in Prize Stories 1970: The O. Henry Awards (1970) and two others; included in Where Are You Going, Where Have You Been?: Selected Early Stories (1993)
"The Children"	short story	Transatlantic Review (Summer 1969)	Marriages and Infidelities (1972)	Anthologized in Prize Stories 1971: The O. Henry Awards (1971)
"Convalescing"	short story	Virginia Quarterly Review (Summer 1969)	The Wheel of Love and Other Stories (1970)	
"How We Fall in Love"	short story	New Orleans Review (Summer 1969)	Uncollected	
"Private Life"	short story	The Yale Review (Fall 1969)	Uncollected	Anthologized in Coming Together: Modern Stories by Black and White Americans (1972)
"Dreams"	short story	Prairie Schooner (Winter 1969–70)	Crossing the Border (1976)	

== 1970s ==
=== 1970 ===
Title	Type	Originally published in	Collected in	Notes
"The Dreaming Woman"	short story	Cupid and Psyche (1970)	The Seduction and Other Stories (1975)	Original title "Cupid and Psyche"; published as standalone limited edition book
"Ontological Proof of My Existence"	play	Partisan Review (1970)	Three Plays (1980)	Included in The Perfectionist and Other Plays (1995)
"Demons"	short story	Southern Review (Winter 1970)	The Wheel of Love and Other Stories (1970)	Included in Wild Saturday and Other Stories (1984)
"Bodies"	short story	Harper's Bazaar (February 1970)	The Wheel of Love and Other Stories (1970)	Anthologized in Strangeness: A Collection of Curious Tales (1977)
"What Is the Connection Between Men and Women?"	short story	Mademoiselle (February 1970)	The Wheel of Love and Other Stories (1970)	
"You"	short story	Cosmopolitan (February 1970)	The Wheel of Love and Other Stories (1970)	Included in Where Are You Going, Where Have You Been?: Stories of Young America (1974) and one other
"I Was in Love"	short story	Shenandoah (Spring 1970)	The Wheel of Love and Other Stories (1970)	Anthologized in Valentine's Day: Women Against Men: Stories of Revenge (2000)
"What Herbert Breuer and I Did to Each Other"	short story	McCall's (April 1970)	Uncollected	
"Love and Death"	short story	The Atlantic (June 1970)	Marriages and Infidelities (1972)	Anthologized in Black and White: Stories of American Life (1971) and two others; included in Where Are You Going, Where Have You Been?: Selected Early Stories (1993)
"Through the Looking Glass"	short story	The Malahat Review (July 1970)	Crossing the Border (1976)	Anthologized in The Best Little Magazine Fiction 1971 (1971)
"Wednesday's Child"	short story	Esquire (August 1970)	Marriages and Infidelities (1972)	Original title "Wednesday"
"After Love a Formal Feeling Comes"	short story	Prism International (Fall 1970)	Love and Its Derangements (1970)	
"The Dark"	short story	Southwest Review (Fall 1970)	Uncollected	Excerpt from Wonderland (1971)
"Where I Lived, and What I Lived For"	short story	Virginia Quarterly Review (Fall 1970)	Marriages and Infidelities (1972)	
"Wild Saturday"	short story	Mademoiselle (September 1970)	The Wheel of Love and Other Stories (1970)	Included in Where Are You Going, Where Have You Been?: Stories of Young America (1974) and one other
"Pilgrim's Progress"	short story	Playboy (October 1970)	The Hungry Ghosts: Seven Allusive Comedies (1974)	Original title "Saul Bird Says: Relate! Communicate! Liberate!"; anthologized in Prize Stories 1972: The O. Henry Awards (1972)
"Puzzle"	short story	Redbook (November 1970)	Marriages and Infidelities (1972)	
"29 Inventions"	short story	The Antioch Review (Fall 1970/Winter 1971)	Marriages and Infidelities (1972)	

=== 1971 ===
Title	Type	Originally published in	Collected in	Notes
"Free"	short story	Quarterly Review of Literature (1971)	The Goddess and Other Women (1974)	
"An American Adventure"	short story	TriQuarterly (Winter 1971)	Where Are You Going, Where Have You Been?: Stories of Young America (1974)	Included in The Seduction and Other Stories (1975)
"Notes on Contributors"	short story	TriQuarterly (Winter 1971)	The Seduction and Other Stories (1975)	
"Stray Children"	short story	Salmagundi (Winter 1971)	Marriages and Infidelities (1972)	Included in Where Are You Going, Where Have You Been?: Stories of Young America (1974) and one other
"Normal Love"	short story	The Atlantic (January 1971)	Marriages and Infidelities (1972)	Anthologized in Intimate Relationships: Marriage, Family, and Lifestyles Through Literature (1975)
"To My Lover, Who Has Abandoned Me..."	short story	Cosmopolitan (January 1971)	Uncollected	
"Fat"	short story	Antaeus (Spring 1971)	Uncollected	Excerpt from Wonderland (1971)
"How Another Child Came to Be Born"	short story	Voyages (Spring 1971)	Uncollected	Anthologized in D.C. Magazines: A Literary Retrospective (1981)
"The Turn of the Screw"	short story	The Iowa Review (Spring 1971)	Marriages and Infidelities (1972)	Included in Where Are You Going, Where Have You Been?: Selected Early Stories (1993); anthologized in Postmodern American Fiction: A Norton Anthology (1998)
"Our Lady of the Easy Death of Alferce"	short story	Prism International (Summer 1971)	The Poisoned Kiss and Other Stories from the Portuguese (1975)	
"Plot"	short story	The Paris Review (Summer 1971)	Marriages and Infidelities (1972)	Anthologized in Scenes From American Life: Contemporary Short Fiction (1973)
"Scenes of Passion & Despair"	short story	Shenandoah (Summer 1971)	Marriages and Infidelities (1972)	
"The Enchanted Piano"	short story	Harper's Bazaar (June 1971)	The Poisoned Kiss and Other Stories from the Portuguese (1975)	
"The Dead"	short story	McCall's (July 1971)	Marriages and Infidelities (1972)	Original title "The Death of Dreams"; anthologized in Prize Stories 1973: The O. Henry Awards (1973) and Prize Stories of the Seventies from the O. Henry Awards (1981); included in Where Are You Going, Where Have You Been?: Selected Early Stories (1993) and High Lonesome: New & Selected Stories (2006)
"And How Is Your Life"	short story	Cosmopolitan (August 1971)	Uncollected	
"Bloodstains"	short story	Harper's (August 1971)	Night-Side: Eighteen Tales (1977)	Included in Where Are You Going, Where Have You Been?: Selected Early Stories (1993)
"Loss"	short story	Southwest Review (Fall 1971)	The Poisoned Kiss and Other Stories from the Portuguese (1975)	
"Loving Losing Loving... a Man"	short story	The Southern Review (Fall 1971)	Marriages and Infidelities (1972)	
"The Son of God and His Sorrow"	short story	The Massachusetts Review (Fall 1971)	The Poisoned Kiss and Other Stories from the Portuguese (1975)	
"How My Father Was Murdered"	short story	The Atlantic (September 1971)	Uncollected	
"The Obsession"	short story	Ladies' Home Journal (October 1971)	Uncollected	
"The Metamorphosis"	short story	New American Review (November 1971)	Marriages and Infidelities (1972)	Original title "Others' Dreams"; anthologized in Experience and Expression: Reading and Responding to Short Fiction (1976)
"Happy Onion"	short story	The Antioch Review (Winter 1971–72)	Marriages and Infidelities (1972)	Included in Where Are You Going, Where Have You Been?: Stories of Young America (1974)
"6:27 p.m."	short story	Redbook (December 1971)	The Seduction and Other Stories (1975)	Anthologized in Solo: Women on Woman Alone (1977)
"The Secret Mirror"	short story	December (December 1971)	The Poisoned Kiss and Other Stories from the Portuguese (1975)	

=== 1972 ===
Title	Type	Originally published in	Collected in	Notes
"DOUBLE TRAGEDY STRIKES TENNESSEE HILL FAMILY"	short story	Carolina Quarterly (Winter 1972)	The Seduction and Other Stories (1975)	
"Up From Slavery"	short story	Playboy (January 1972)	The Hungry Ghosts: Seven Allusive Comedies (1974)	Original title "The Loves of Franklin Ambrose"; anthologized in Aspects of Love (1972) and 29 Short Stories: An Introductory Anthology (1975)
"Blindfold"	short story	The Southern Review (Spring 1972)	The Goddess and Other Women (1974)	
"Extraordinary Popular Delusions"	short story	Virginia Quarterly Review (Spring 1972)	Marriages and Infidelities (1972)	
"A Girl at the Edge of the Ocean"	short story	The Falcon (Spring 1972)	Where Are You Going, Where Have You Been?: Stories of Young America (1974)	Included in The Goddess and Other Women (1974) and Wild Saturday and Other Stories (1984)
"The Lady With the Pet Dog"	short story	Partisan Review (Spring 1972)	Marriages and Infidelities (1972)	Anthologized in Bitches and Sad Ladies: An Anthology of Fiction By and About Women (1975) and two others; included in Where Are You Going, Where Have You Been?: Selected Early Stories (1993) and High Lonesome: New & Selected Stories (2006)
"Did You Ever Slip on Red Blood?"	short story	Harper's (April 1971)	Marriages and Infidelities (1972)	Anthologized in Urban Horrors (1990); included in Where Are You Going, Where Have You Been?: Selected Early Stories (1993)
"The Sacred Marriage"	short story	The Southern Review (Summer 1972)	Marriages and Infidelities (1972)	
"Stalking"	short story	North American Review (Summer 1972)	Marriages and Infidelities (1972)	Included in Where Are You Going, Where Have You Been?: Stories of Young America (1974); anthologized in The Short Story: An Introduction (1976)
"Letters to Fernandes from a Young American Poet"	short story	Chelsea (June 1972)	The Poisoned Kiss and Other Stories from the Portuguese (1975)	
"Problems of Adjustment in Survivors of Natural/Unnatural Disasters"	short story	Boston Review (June 1972)	Marriages and Infidelities (1972)	
"Nightmusic"	short story	Mundus Artium (July 1972)	Marriages and Infidelities (1972)	
"Silkie"	short story	The Malahat Review (July 1972)	Where Are You Going, Where Have You Been?: Stories of Young America (1974)	Anthologized in The Best American Short Stories 1973 (1973); included in Where Are You Going, Where Have You Been?: Selected Early Stories (1993)
"Back There"	short story	Epoch (Fall 1972)	Where Are You Going, Where Have You Been?: Stories of Young America (1974)	
"Husband and Wife"	short story	Carolina Quarterly (Fall 1972)	The Poisoned Kiss and Other Stories from the Portuguese (1975)	
"Narcotic"	short story	Mademoiselle (October 1972)	The Goddess and Other Women (1974)	Anthologized in Last Night's Stranger: One Night Stands & Other Staples of Modern Life (1982)
"Small Avalanches"	short story	Cosmopolitan (November 1972)	The Goddess and Other Women (1974)	Included in Where Are You Going, Where Have You Been?: Selected Early Stories (1993), High Lonesome: New & Selected Stories (2006) and one other

=== 1973 ===
Title	Type	Originally published in	Collected in	Notes
"Assault"	short story	Review of Existential Psychology and Psychiatry (1973)	The Goddess and Other Women (1974)	
"The Madwoman"	short story	Review of Existential Psychology and Psychiatry (1973)	The Seduction and Other Stories (1975)	
"Passions and Meditations"	short story	Partisan Review (1973)	The Seduction and Other Stories (1975)	
"Three Women"	short story	The Stone Wall Book of Short Fictions (1973)	Uncollected	
"Where the Continent Ends"	short story	Northwest Review (1973)	Uncollected	
"Meredith Dawe"	short story	TriQuarterly (Winter 1973)	Uncollected	Excerpt from Do With Me What You Will (1973); reprinted in TriQuarterly (Spring/Summer 1985)
"... & Answers"	short story	Family Circle (January 1973)	The Goddess and Other Women (1974)	
"Concerning the Case of Bobby T."	short story	The Atlantic (February 1973)	The Goddess and Other Women (1974)	Included in High Lonesome: New & Selected Stories (2006)
"Democracy in America"	short story	Shenandoah (Spring 1973)	The Hungry Ghosts: Seven Allusive Comedies (1974)	
"Five Pieces from Azulejos"	short story	Transatlantic Review (Spring 1973)	Uncollected	
"I Must Have You"	short story	Ohio Review (Spring 1973)	The Goddess and Other Women (1974)	
"The Wheel"	short story	Epoch (Spring 1973)	The Goddess and Other Women (1974)	
"Elena"	short story	Works in Progress (April 1973)	Uncollected	Excerpt from Do With Me What You Will (1973)
"Do With Me What You Will"	short story	Playboy (June 1973)	Uncollected	Excerpt from Do With Me What You Will (1973); reprinted in Antaeus (Summer 1973); anthologized in The Edgar Award Book (1996) and The Best American Mystery Stories of the Century (2000)
"A Descriptive Catalogue"	short story	Carolina Quarterly (Fall 1973)	The Hungry Ghosts: Seven Allusive Comedies (1974)	
"The Letter"	short story	The Literary Review (Fall 1973)	The Poisoned Kiss and Other Stories from the Portuguese (1975)	
"Explorations"	short story	Remington Review (October 1973)	The Goddess and Other Women (1974)	
"The Maniac"	short story	Viva (October 1973)	The Goddess and Other Women (1974)	

=== 1974 ===
Title	Type	Originally published in	Collected in	Notes
"The Girl"	short story	The Girl (1974)	The Goddess and Other Women (1974)	Originally published as standalone limited edition book
"Miracle Play"	play	Miracle Play (1974)	Three Plays (1980)	Originally published as standalone limited edition book
"The Impostors"	short story	Review of Existential Psychology and Psychiatry (1974)	The Seduction and Other Stories (1975)	
"Love, Careless Love"	short story	Northwest Review (1974)	The Triumph of the Spider Monkey (2019)	
"Plagiarized Material"	short story	Plagiarized Material by Fernandes (1974)	The Poisoned Kiss and Other Stories from the Portuguese (1975)	Originally published as standalone limited edition book
"Years of Wonders"	short story	Where Are You Going, Where Have You Been?: Stories of Young America (1974)	Where Are You Going, Where Have You Been?: Stories of Young America (1974)	Included in The Seduction and Other Stories (1975)
"Angst"	short story	University of Windsor Review (Winter 1974)	The Hungry Ghosts: Seven Allusive Comedies (1974)	
"The Birth of Tragedy"	short story	Exile (Spring 1974)	The Hungry Ghosts: Seven Allusive Comedies (1974)	
"The Murderer"	short story	Greensboro Review (Spring 1974)	The Poisoned Kiss and Other Stories from the Portuguese (1975)	
"Parricide"	short story	The Yale Review (Spring 1974)	The Poisoned Kiss and Other Stories from the Portuguese (1975)	
"The Poisoned Kiss"	short story	Greensboro Review (Spring 1974)	The Poisoned Kiss and Other Stories from the Portuguese (1975)	
"Rewards of Fame"	short story	The Hungry Ghosts: Seven Allusive Comedies (1974)	The Hungry Ghosts: Seven Allusive Comedies (1974)	
"The Golden Madonna"	short story	Playboy (March 1974)	Crossing the Border (1976)	
"The Goddess"	short story	Antaeus (Spring/Summer 1974)	The Goddess and Other Women (1974)	
"Magna Mater"	short story	Antaeus (Spring/Summer 1974)	The Goddess and Other Women (1974)	
"Customs"	short story	The Fiddlehead (Summer 1974)	Crossing the Border (1976)	
"The Seduction"	short story	The Southern Review (Summer 1974)	The Seduction and Other Stories (1975)	Original title "Help..."
"Two Young Men"	short story	Aspen Leaves (June 1974)	The Poisoned Kiss and Other Stories from the Portuguese (1975)	
"Natural Boundaries"	short story	Family Circle (August 1974)	Crossing the Border (1976)	
"Honeybit"	short story	Confrontation (Fall 1974)	The Goddess and Other Women (1974)	
"The Lover"	short story	Exile (Fall 1974)	Night-Side: Eighteen Tales (1977)	Included in Oates in Exile (1990)
"The Transformation of Vincent Scoville"	short story	Canadian Fiction Magazine (Fall 1974)	Crossing the Border (1976)	
"Wealthy Lady"	play	Epoch (Fall 1974)	Women Whose Lives Are Food, Men Whose Lives Are Money (1978)	Included in Twelve Plays (1991); revised
"A Premature Autobiography"	short story	The Goddess and Other Women (1974)	The Goddess and Other Women (1974)	
"Psychiatric Services"	short story	The Goddess and Other Women (1974)	The Goddess and Other Women (1974)	Anthologized in On The Job: Fiction About Work by Contemporary American Writers (1977)
"Ruth"	short story	The Goddess and Other Women (1974)	The Goddess and Other Women (1974)	Reprinted in Short Story International (August 1985)
"Unpublished Fragments"	short story	The Goddess and Other Women (1974)	The Goddess and Other Women (1974)	Reprinted in Fiction International (Fall 1983)
"The Snowstorm"	short story	Mademoiselle (September 1974)	Night-Side: Eighteen Tales (1977)	Original title "The Snow-Storm"
"On the Gulf"	short story	The South Carolina Review (November 1974)	The Seduction and Other Stories (1975)	
"Crossing the Border"	short story	The New York Times Magazine (December 1, 1974)	Crossing the Border (1976)	

=== 1975 ===
Title	Type	Originally published in	Collected in	Notes
"The Brain of Dr. Vicente"	short story	The Poisoned Kiss and Other Stories from the Portuguese (1975)	The Poisoned Kiss and Other Stories from the Portuguese (1975)	
"The Cruel Master"	short story	The Poisoned Kiss and Other Stories from the Portuguese (1975)	The Poisoned Kiss and Other Stories from the Portuguese (1975)	
"Distance"	short story	The Poisoned Kiss and Other Stories from the Portuguese (1975)	The Poisoned Kiss and Other Stories from the Portuguese (1975)	
"Maimed"	short story	The Poisoned Kiss and Other Stories from the Portuguese (1975)	The Poisoned Kiss and Other Stories from the Portuguese (1975)	
"Getting and Spending"	short story	The Seduction and Other Stories (1975)	The Seduction and Other Stories (1975)	
"Hell"	short story	The Seduction and Other Stories (1975)	The Seduction and Other Stories (1975)	
"The Sacrifice"	short story	Fiction International (1975)	Night-Side: Eighteen Tales (1977)	
"The Tempter"	short story	Fiction (1975)	Crossing the Border (1976)	
"Blood-Swollen Landscape"	short story	The Southern Review (Winter 1975)	All the Good People I've Left Behind (1979)	Anthologized in Prize Stories 1976: The O. Henry Awards (1976)
"The Dungeon"	short story	The Iowa Review (Winter 1975)	Night-Side: Eighteen Tales (1977)	
"Love. Friendship."	short story	Chatelaine (January 1975)	Crossing the Border (1976)	
"Falling in Love in Ashton, British Columbia"	short story	Epoch (Spring 1975)	Crossing the Border (1976)	
"The Hallucination"	short story	Chicago Review (Spring 1975)	All the Good People I've Left Behind (1979)	Anthologized in The Pushcart Prize: Best of the Small Presses (1976)
"The Liberation of Jake Hanley"	short story	Queen's Quarterly (Spring 1975)	Crossing the Border (1976)	
"The Scream"	short story	Michigan Quarterly Review (Spring 1975)	Crossing the Border (1976)	
"The Widows"	short story	The Hudson Review (Spring 1975)	Night-Side: Eighteen Tales (1977)	Included in Where Are You Going, Where Have You Been?: Selected Early Stories (1993)
"Corinne"	short story	North American Review (Fall 1975)	Uncollected	

=== 1976 ===
Title	Type	Originally published in	Collected in	Notes
"The Triumph of the Spider Monkey"	novella	The Triumph of the Spider Monkey (1976)	The Triumph of the Spider Monkey (2019)	Originally published as standalone limited edition book
"An Incident in the Park"	short story	Crossing the Border (1976)	Crossing the Border (1976)	
"The Giant Woman"	short story	Kansas Quarterly (Winter 1976)	Night-Side: Eighteen Tales (1977)	
"Walled City"	short story	Queen's Quarterly (Winter 1976)	All the Good People I've Left Behind (1979)	Reprinted in Queen's Quarterly (Spring 1993)
"The Wedding Party"	short story	Aspen Leaves (Winter 1976)	Uncollected	
"Mara"	short story	TriQuarterly (Spring 1976)	Uncollected	
"Hello Fine Day Isn't It?"	short story	The Malahat Review (April 1976)	Crossing the Border (1976)	
"River Rising"	short story	Chatelaine (May 1976)	Crossing the Border (1976)	
"Knowing"	short story	The Ontario Review (Spring/Summer 1976)	Uncollected	
"The Buried Self"	short story	Western Humanities Review (Summer 1976)	Uncollected	As Rae-Jolene Smith
"Paradise: A Post-Love Story"	short story	Shenandoah (Summer 1976)	Uncollected	
"The Blessing"	short story	The Blessing (June 1976)	Night-Side: Eighteen Tales (1977)	Originally published as standalone limited edition book
"The Tryst"	short story	The Atlantic (August 1976)	All the Good People I've Left Behind (1979)	Reprinted in Cosmopolitan (August 1981); included in A Sentimental Education (1980) and High Lonesome: New & Selected Stories (2006)
"The Embrace"	short story	Exile (Summer/Fall 1976)	Uncollected	
"Immortal Longings"	short story	Exile (Summer/Fall 1976)	Uncollected	Included in Oates in Exile (1990)
"Disappearance"	short story	North American Review (Fall 1976)	Uncollected	As Rae-Jolene Smith
"Gay"	short story	Playboy (December 1976)	Uncollected	Anthologized in The Best American Short Stories 1977 (1977)
"Honeymoon"	short story	Greensboro Review (Winter 1976–77)	Uncollected	
"Sunday Blues"	short story	Fiction (December 1976/April 1977)	Uncollected	

=== 1977 ===
Title	Type	Originally published in	Collected in	Notes
"Daisy"	short story	Daisy (1977)	Night-Side: Eighteen Tales (1977)	Originally published as standalone limited edition book; anthologized in Major American Short Stories: Revised Edition (1980) and Third Edition (1994); included in Where Are You Going, Where Have You Been?: Selected Early Stories (1993)
"Exile"	short story	Night-Side: Eighteen Tales (1977)	Night-Side: Eighteen Tales (1977)	Reprinted in Tales (Summer 1978)
"The Murder"	short story	Night-Side: Eighteen Tales (1977)	Night-Side: Eighteen Tales (1977)	Anthologized in The Arbor House Treasury of Mystery and Suspense (1981)
"A Theory of Knowledge"	short story	Night-Side: Eighteen Tales (1977)	Night-Side: Eighteen Tales (1977)	
"The Insomniac"	short story	Exile (Winter 1977)	Uncollected	Included in Oates in Exile (1990)
"Intoxication"	short story	Boston University Journal (February 1977)	All the Good People I've Left Behind (1979)	
"The Thaw"	short story	Viva (February 1977)	Night-Side: Eighteen Tales (1977)	
"Further Confessions"	short story	Chicago Review (Spring 1977)	Night-Side: Eighteen Tales (1977)	Anthologized in The Slaying of the Dragon: Modern Tales of the Playful Imagination (1984)
"Sentimental Journey"	short story	The South Carolina Review (April 1977)	All the Good People I've Left Behind (1979)	
"All the Good People I've Left Behind"	short story	Redbook (May 1977)	All the Good People I've Left Behind (1979)	
"Famine Country"	short story	The Yale Review (Summer 1977)	Night-Side: Eighteen Tales (1977)	
"Fatal Woman"	short story	The Fiddlehead (Summer 1977)	Night-Side: Eighteen Tales (1977)	Reprinted in Playgirl (June 1978); anthologized in The Arbor House Treasury of Mystery and Suspense (1981)
"Gargoyle"	short story	StoryQuarterly (June 1977)	Uncollected	Anthologized in Taboos and Transgressions: Stories of Wrongdoings (2021)
"The Tattoo"	short story	Mademoiselle (July 1977)	Uncollected	Reprinted in Bananas (February 1980); anthologized in Prize Stories 1978: The O. Henry Awards (1978)
"Black Eucharist"	short story	Canto (Fall 1977)	Uncollected	
"Night-Side"	short story	Queen's Quarterly (Fall 1977)	Night-Side: Eighteen Tales (1977)	Anthologized in Specter!: A Chrestomathy of "Spookery" (1982), The Dark Descent (1987) and one other
"Poetics 105"	short story	Descant (Fall 1977)	Uncollected	
"The Translation"	short story	TriQuarterly (Fall 1977)	Night-Side: Eighteen Tales (1977)	Anthologized in The Best American Short Stories 1978 (1978) and one other; included in Where Are You Going, Where Have You Been?: Selected Early Stories (1993)

=== 1978 ===
Title	Type	Originally published in	Collected in	Notes
"North Wind"	short story	Banquet: Five Short Stories (1978)	Uncollected	
"Sentimental Education"	novella	Sentimental Education (1978)	A Sentimental Education (1980)	Originally published as standalone limited edition book
"The Step-Father"	short story	The Step-Father (1978)	Uncollected	Originally published as standalone limited edition book
"Eye-Witness"	short story	Michigan Quarterly Review (Winter 1978)	All the Good People I've Left Behind (1979)	
"High"	short story	The Southern Review (Winter 1978)	All the Good People I've Left Behind (1979)	
"The Voyeur"	short story	Southwest Review (Winter 1978)	Uncollected	
"The Mime"	short story	Penthouse (January 1978)	Uncollected	
"Johanna"	short story	Chatelaine (February 1978)	Uncollected	
"The Death of the Kenyon Review"	short story	The Yale Review (Spring 1978)	Uncollected	As Rae-Jolene Smith
"Expressway"	short story	California Quarterly (Spring/Summer 1978)	Uncollected	
"The Leap"	short story	Confrontation (Spring/Summer 1978)	All the Good People I've Left Behind (1979)	
"In the Autumn of the Year"	short story	Bennington Review (April 1978)	A Sentimental Education (1980)	Anthologized in Prize Stories 1979: The O. Henry Awards (1979)
"Softball"	short story	Shenandoah (Summer 1978)	Uncollected	
"An Unsolved Crime"	short story	Colorado Quarterly (Summer 1978)	Double Trouble (2026)	
"Washington Square"	short story	The Antioch Review (Summer 1978)	Uncollected	Reprinted in The Antioch Review (Fall 2016/Winter 2017)
"First Death"	short story	Mademoiselle (June 1978)	Second Nature (2026)	
"Conquistador"	short story	Weekend (June 17, 1978)	Uncollected	Excerpt from Cybele (1979)
"Casualties"	short story	Chatelaine (July 1978)	Uncollected	
"Beautiful Girl"	short story	Canto (Fall 1978)	Uncollected	
"Deja Vu"	short story	The Missouri Review (Fall 1978)	Uncollected	
"Dies Irae"	short story	New Letters (Fall 1978)	Uncollected	
"November Morning"	short story	Columbia Magazine (Fall 1978)	Uncollected	
"Harriet Stillman"	short story	Saturday Night (November 1978)	Uncollected	
"Night Song"	short story	Greensboro Review (Winter 1978–79)	Uncollected	

=== 1979 ===
Title	Type	Originally published in	Collected in	Notes
"The Lamb of Abyssalia"	short story	The Lamb of Abyssalia (1979)	Last Days: Stories (1984)	Originally published as standalone limited edition book; anthologized in Night Walks: A Bedside Companion (1982)
"Queen of the Night"	short story	Queen of the Night (1979)	A Sentimental Education (1980)	Originally published as standalone limited edition book; reprinted in Bananas (April 1981); anthologized in The Arbor House Celebrity Book of Horror Stories (1982); included in Extenuating Circumstances: Stories of Crime and Suspense (2022)
"Sonata"	short story	Northwest Review (1979)	Uncollected	
"The Doll"	short story	Epoch (Winter 1979)	Haunted: Tales of the Grotesque (1994)	Anthologized in The Arbor House Treasury of Horror and the Supernatural (1981); included in Extenuating Circumstances: Stories of Crime and Suspense (2022)
"Murderess"	short story	Western Humanities Review (Winter 1979)	Double Trouble (2026)	
"Scherzo"	short story	Ohio Review (Winter 1979)	Uncollected	
"New Year's Eve"	short story	Chatelaine (January 1979)	Uncollected	
"The Precipice"	short story	Mississippi Review (Winter/Spring 1979)	A Sentimental Education (1980)	
"The Way We Live"	short story	The Agni Review (Spring 1979)	Uncollected	
"Lost"	short story	Exile (Spring/Summer 1979)	Uncollected	
"Reunion"	short story	New England Review (Summer 1979)	Uncollected	
"From Son of the Morning"	short story	Granta (Autumn 1979)	Uncollected	Excerpt from Son of the Morning (1978)
"The Reliquary"	short story	Queen's Quarterly (Fall 1979)	Uncollected	
"White Shadow"	short story	The Kenyon Review (Fall 1979)	Uncollected	
"Fateful Mismatches"	short story	The Ontario Review (Fall–Winter 1979–80)	Uncollected	Excerpt from Bellefleur (1980)
"The Lesson"	short story	Chatelaine (September 1979)	Uncollected	

== 1980s ==
=== 1980 ===
Title	Type	Originally published in	Collected in	Notes
"The Bingo Master"	short story	Dark Forces: New Stories of Suspense and Supernatural Horror (1980)	Haunted: Tales of the Grotesque (1994)	
"Dawn, Dusk"	short story	Shenandoah (1980)	Uncollected	
"A Middle-Class Education"	short story	A Middle-Class Education (1980)	A Sentimental Education (1980)	Originally published as standalone limited edition book
"Nightshade"	short story	StoryQuarterly (1980)	Uncollected	Excerpt from Bellefleur (1980)
"Ballerina"	short story	The Georgia Review (Winter 1980)	Uncollected	
"Birds of Night"	short story	Exile (Winter 1980)	Uncollected	Included in Oates in Exile (1990)
"The Changeling"	short story	The Missouri Review (Winter 1980)	Uncollected	
"Going-Away Party"	short story	Antaeus (Winter 1980)	Uncollected	Excerpt from Marya: A Life (1986); anthologized in Story: Fictions Past and Present (1985), Classic Short Fiction (1986) and one other
"The Haunted House"	short story	Kansas Quarterly (Winter 1980)	Uncollected	
"Sin"	short story	Fiction International (Winter 1980)	Uncollected	Excerpt from Marya: A Life (1986); anthologized in Moral Fiction: An Anthology (1980)
"The Spider, Love"	short story	TriQuarterly (Winter 1980)	Uncollected	Excerpt from Bellefleur (1980)
"The Birthday Celebration"	short story	Virginia Quarterly Review (Winter 1980)	Uncollected	Excerpt from Bellefleur (1980)
"Mutilated Woman"	short story	Michigan Quarterly Review (Spring 1980)	Uncollected	Anthologized in Prize Stories 1981: The O. Henry Awards (1981)
"Sisters"	short story	The South Carolina Review (Spring 1980)	Uncollected	
"Friday Evening"	short story	Penthouse (March 1980)	Uncollected	
"The Outing"	short story	Mademoiselle (March 1980)	Uncollected	Excerpt from Marya: A Life (1986)
"The Clavichord"	short story	Confrontation (Spring/Summer 1980)	Uncollected	Excerpt from Bellefleur (1980)
"The Ebony Casket"	short story	Exile (Summer 1980)	Uncollected	Included in Oates in Exile (1990)
"The Room of Contamination"	short story	Western Humanities Review (Summer 1980)	Uncollected	Excerpt from Bellefleur (1980)
"The Joyful Wedding"	short story	Cosmopolitan (August 1980)	Uncollected	Excerpt from Bellefleur (1980)
"Schwilk"	short story	California Quarterly (Summer/Fall 1980)	Uncollected	Excerpt from Marya: A Life (1986)
"Presque Isle"	short story	The Agni Review (Fall 1980)	Uncollected	Anthologized in The Best American Short Stories 1981 (1981)
"The Doomed Girl"	short story	Bennington Review (September 1980)	Uncollected	
"The Antique Clock"	short story	The Malahat Review (October 1980)	Uncollected	
"Anatomical Studies"	short story	Chatelaine (November 1980)	Uncollected	Excerpt from Angel of Light (1981)

=== 1981 ===
Title	Type	Originally published in	Collected in	Notes
"Theft"	short story	Northwest Review (1981)	Uncollected	Excerpt from Marya: A Life (1986); anthologized in The Best American Short Stories 1982 (1982)
"Marya and Sylvester"	short story	Western Humanities Review (Winter 1981)	Uncollected	Excerpt from Marya: A Life (1986)
"An Old-Fashioned Love Story"	short story	Exile (Winter 1981)	Uncollected	Included in Oates in Exile (1990)
"Poor Lizzie"	short story	Exile (Winter 1981)	Uncollected	Included in Oates in Exile (1990)
"The Lovers"	short story	Canto (February 1981)	Uncollected	
"The Man Whom Women Adored"	short story	North American Review (March 1981)	Last Days: Stories (1984)	Anthologized in Prize Stories 1982: The O. Henry Awards (1982)
"The Rose Wall"	short story	The Twilight Zone Magazine (April 1981)	Uncollected	Anthologized in Great Stories from Rod Serling's The Twilight Zone Magazine (1982)
"Détente"	short story	The Southern Review (Summer 1981)	Last Days: Stories (1984)	Anthologized in The Pushcart Prize VII: Best of the Small Presses (1983)
"Minor Characters"	short story	The Massachusetts Review (Summer 1981)	Uncollected	
"My Warszawa, 1980"	short story	The Kenyon Review (Fall 1981)	Last Days: Stories (1984)	Original title "My Warszawa"; anthologized in Prize Stories 1983: The O. Henry Awards (1983); included in High Lonesome: New & Selected Stories (2006)
"The Storm"	short story	Cosmopolitan (September 1981)	Uncollected	Excerpt from Angel of Light (1981)
"The Sunken Woman"	short story	Playboy (December 1981)	Uncollected	Reprinted in Playboy (January 1989)

=== 1982 ===
Title	Type	Originally published in	Collected in	Notes
"Back Country"	short story	Shenandoah (1982–83)	Uncollected	Excerpt from Marya: A Life (1986)
"The Crystal Sea"	short story	Saturday Night (January 1982)	Uncollected	
"The Bat"	short story	Shenandoah (Summer 1982)	Uncollected	
"The Mirror"	short story	South Carolina Review (Spring 1982)	Uncollected	
"Our Wall"	short story	Partisan Review (Spring 1982)	Last Days: Stories (1984)	Included in High Lonesome: New & Selected Stories (2006)
"Ghost Town"	short story	The Literary Review (Summer 1982)	Uncollected	Reprinted in Journal of the Short Story in English (Spring 2025)
"A Bloodsmoor Romance"	short story	Ms. (June 1982)	Uncollected	Excerpt from A Bloodsmoor Romance (1982); anthologized in 50 Years of Ms. (2023)
"Growing Seasons and Killing Frosts"	short story	The Agni Review (Fall 1982)	Uncollected	
"Magic"	short story	The Antioch Review (Fall 1982)	Uncollected	
"The Pedlar"	short story	New England Review and Bread Loaf Quarterly (Autumn–Winter 1982)	Uncollected	Excerpt from A Bloodsmoor Romance (1982)
"Plover Hill"	short story	Prairie Schooner (Winter 1982–83)	Uncollected	
"Ich Bin Ein Berliner"	short story	Esquire (December 1982)	Last Days: Stories (1984)	Anthologized in Great Esquire Fiction: The Finest Stories from the First Fifty Years (1983)

=== 1983 ===
Title	Type	Originally published in	Collected in	Notes
"Hull and the Motions of Grace"	short story	Northwest Review (1983)	Uncollected	Reprinted in Northwest Review (1987)
"Nairobi"	short story	The Paris Review (Spring 1983)	Raven's Wing (1986)	Anthologized in The Best American Short Stories 1984 (1984); included in High Lonesome: New & Selected Stories (2006)
"Rabies and Race: An Hypothesis"	short story	Partisan Review (Spring 1983)	Uncollected	Excerpt from The Crosswicks Horror; not included in novel published as The Accursed (2013)
"The Victim"	short story	The Iowa Review (Spring 1983)	Uncollected	
"The Witness"	short story	Antaeus (Spring/Summer 1983)	Last Days: Stories (1984)	
"The Granite Springs Elegies"	short story	Carolina Quarterly (Summer 1983)	Uncollected	
"Last Days"	short story	Michigan Quarterly Review (Summer 1983)	Last Days: Stories (1984)	Included in High Lonesome: New & Selected Stories (2006)
"The Funeral"	short story	Tropic (June 19, 1983)	Uncollected	
"Funland"	short story	Funland (July 1983)	Last Days: Stories (1984)	Originally published as standalone limited edition book
"Night. Sleep. Death. The Stars."	short story	Queen's Quarterly (Autumn 1983)	Last Days: Stories (1984)	
"Old Budapest"	short story	The Kenyon Review (Fall 1983)	Last Days: Stories (1984)	
"Harrow Street in Linden"	short story	The Massachusetts Review (Winter 1983)	Raven's Wing (1986)	
"Improvisation"	short story	New Letters (Winter 1983)	Uncollected	
"December"	short story	Carolina Quarterly (Winter 1983)	Uncollected	Anthologized in Southern Lights: 75 Years of the Carolina Quarterly (2023)
"The Seasons"	short story	Ploughshares (Winter 1983–84)	Raven's Wing (1986)	Anthologized in Prize Stories 1985: The O. Henry Awards (1985)

=== 1984 ===
Title	Type	Originally published in	Collected in	Notes
"Blackmail"	short story	New Directions 48 (1984)	Uncollected	
"Chloe"	short story	Fiction International (1984)	Uncollected	
"The Lost Suitor"	short story	Avenue (February 1984)	Uncollected	Excerpt from Mysteries of Winterthurn (1984)
"Silver Storm"	short story	The Agni Review (Spring 1984)	Uncollected	
"Manslaughter"	short story	The Malahat Review (June 1984)	Raven's Wing (1986)	Included in High Lonesome: New & Selected Stories (2006)
"Canal Road"	short story	The Southern Review (Summer 1984)	Uncollected	Excerpt from Marya: A Life (1986)
"Delia's Adventures"	short story	Denver Quarterly (Summer 1984)	Uncollected	
"For I Will Consider My Cat Jeoffry"	short story	Michigan Quarterly Review (Summer 1984)	Uncollected	
"Raven's Wing"	short story	Esquire (August 1984)	Raven's Wing (1986)	Anthologized in The Best American Short Stories 1985 (1985); included in High Lonesome: New & Selected Stories (2006)
"The Nordic Soul"	short story	The Washington Post Magazine (August 5, 1984)	Uncollected	Excerpt from The Crosswicks Horror, published as The Accursed (2013); revised (2010)
"Master Race"	short story	Partisan Review (Fall 1984)	Uncollected	Anthologized in Prize Stories 1986: The O. Henry Awards (1986)
"The Cure for Folly"	short story	TriQuarterly (Winter 1984)	Uncollected	Excerpt from Marya: A Life (1986)
"The Boy"	short story	Playgirl (December 1984)	The Assignation (1988)	Included in Twelve Plays (1991)
"Happy"	short story	Vanity Fair (December 1984)	Raven's Wing (1986)	Anthologized in Sudden Fiction: American Short-Short Stories (1986); expanded as "Happy Christmas: A Short Story" (2023)

=== 1985 ===
Title	Type	Originally published in	Collected in	Notes
"Wild Nights"	short story	Wild Nights (1985)	Uncollected	Originally published as standalone limited edition book
"Sonata Quasi una Fantasia"	short story	Fiction (1985)	Uncollected	
"Ballad"	short story	Southwest Review (Spring 1985)	Uncollected	
"Pain"	short story	New Letters (Spring 1985)	Uncollected	Excerpt from Marya: A Life (1986)
"The Bequest"	short story	New England Review and Bread Loaf Quarterly (Spring 1985)	Uncollected	Excerpt from Marya: A Life (1986)
"Secret Observations on the Goat-Girl"	short story	Pequod (March 1985)	The Assignation (1988)	Anthologized in The Oxford Book of Gothic Tales (1992) and Primary Sources on Monsters: Demonstrare, Volume 2 (2018)
"Golden Gloves"	short story	The Washington Post Magazine (August 4, 1985)	Raven's Wing (1986)	Reprinted in Crosscurrents (June 1991); included in High Lonesome: New & Selected Stories (2006)
"In Parenthesis"	short story	Chelsea (October 1985)	Uncollected	
"Baby"	short story	The Ontario Review (Fall–Winter 1985–86)	Raven's Wing (1986)	
"The Heir"	short story	The Massachusetts Review (Winter 1985)	Where Is Here? (1992)	
"Mercury, Venus, Earth, Mars..."	short story	Exile (Winter 1985)	Uncollected	Included in Oates in Exile (1990)
"The Jesuit"	short story	The Missouri Review (Winter 1985–86)	Raven's Wing (1986)	
"The Mother"	short story	Shenandoah (1985–86)	Raven's Wing (1986)	Included in Where Is Here? (1992)

=== 1986 ===
Title	Type	Originally published in	Collected in	Notes
"April"	short story	Raven's Wing (1986)	Raven's Wing (1986)	
"Little Blood-Button"	short story	New Directions 50 (1986)	Raven's Wing (1986)	Included in Twelve Plays (1991); revised
"Nuclear Holocaust"	short story	New Directions 50 (1986)	Raven's Wing (1986)	Included in Twelve Plays (1991)
"Maximum Security"	short story	New Directions 50 (1986)	The Assignation (1988)	
"Turquoise"	short story	New Directions 50 (1986)	Where Is Here? (1992)	
"Little Moses/The Society for the Reclamation and Restoration of 'E. Auguste Napoléon Bonaparte'"	short story	The New Black Mask (1986)	Uncollected	Excerpt from My Heart Laid Bare (1998)
"The Orphan"	short story	The Agni Review (1986)	Uncollected	
"Photographer's Model"	short story	Confrontation (1986)	The Assignation (1988)	
"Soldier"	short story	Confrontation (1986)	Uncollected	
"Señorita"	short story	Northwest Review (1986)	The Assignation (1988)	
"Angel Eyes"	short story	The South Carolina Review (Spring 1986)	Uncollected	
"Double Solitaire"	short story	Michigan Quarterly Review (Spring 1986)	Raven's Wing (1986)	
"Little Wife"	short story	The Kenyon Review (Spring 1986)	Raven's Wing (1986)	
"Surf City"	short story	Partisan Review (Summer 1986)	Raven's Wing (1986)	
"Testimony"	short story	The Southern Review (Summer 1986)	Raven's Wing (1986)	
"The Photographer"	short story	The Washington Post Magazine (August 17, 1986)	Uncollected	
"Fever"	short story	The South Carolina Review (Fall 1986)	Uncollected	
"The Betrayal"	short story	New Letters (Winter/Spring 1986)	Uncollected	
"Ace"	short story	New England Review and Bread Loaf Quarterly (Winter 1986)	The Assignation (1988)	
"Ancient Airs, Voices"	short story	The Antioch Review (Winter 1986)	Raven's Wing (1986)	Anthologized in Prize Stories 1987: The O. Henry Awards (1987); reprinted in The Antioch Review (Winter 1992)
"Anecdote"	short story	Exile (Winter 1986)	The Assignation (1988)	Included in Oates in Exile (1990)
"The Call"	short story	Exile (Winter 1986)	Uncollected	Included in Oates in Exile (1990) and Twelve Plays (1991)
"My Madman"	short story	Exile (Winter 1986)	Where Is Here? (1992)	Included in Oates in Exile (1990)
"One Flesh"	short story	Exile (Winter 1986)	The Assignation (1988)	Included in Oates in Exile (1990) and Twelve Plays (1991)
"Romance"	short story	The Threepenny Review (Winter 1986)	The Assignation (1988)	

=== 1987 ===
Title	Type	Originally published in	Collected in	Notes
"Blue-Bearded Lover"	short story	Blue-Bearded Lover (1987)	The Assignation (1988)	Originally published as standalone limited edition book; included as "Bluebeard's Last Wife" in Twelve Plays (1991)
"County Detention"	short story	Crosscurrents (1987)	Uncollected	
"Twins"	short story	The Ohio Review (1987)	Heat and Other Stories (1991)	
"Haunted"	short story	The Architecture of Fear (1987)	Haunted: Tales of the Grotesque (1994)	Anthologized in The Year's Best Fantasy: First Annual Collection (1988); included in Small Avalanches and Other Stories (2003) and Extenuating Circumstances: Stories of Crime and Suspense (2022)
"The White Cat"	short story	A Matter of Crime: New Stories from the Masters of Mystery & Suspense (1987)	Haunted: Tales of the Grotesque (1994)	Anthologized in The Sophisticated Cat: A Gathering of Stories, Poems, and Miscellaneous Writings About Cats (1992) and Tails of Wonder and Imagination: Cat Stories (2010)
"From The Life of..."	short story	Shenandoah (1987)	Where Is Here? (1992)	
"Slow"	short story	The Southern California Anthology (1987)	The Assignation (1988)	Included as "Slow Motion" in Twelve Plays (1991); anthologized in New Micro: Exceptionally Short Fiction (2018)
"Tick"	short story	The Southern California Anthology (1987)	The Assignation (1988)	
"A Sentimental Encounter"	short story	Epoch (1987–88)	The Assignation (1988)	
"Questions"	short story	Playboy (January 1987)	Faithless: Tales of Transgression (2001)	
"Shopping"	short story	Ms. (March 1987)	Heat and Other Stories (1991)	Anthologized in Short Fiction: Classic and Contemporary, Fourth Edition (1999) and Fifth Edition (2002)
"Sharpshooting"	short story	The Boston Globe Magazine (March 22, 1987)	The Assignation (1988)	
"Mule"	short story	Boston Review (April 1987)	The Assignation (1988)	
"The Knife"	short story	Redbook (May 1987)	Heat and Other Stories (1991)	Original title "The Double-Edged Knife"
"Death, Etc."	short story	Mississippi Review (Spring/Summer 1987)	Uncollected	
"Black"	short story	Witness (Summer 1987)	Uncollected	Included in Twelve Plays (1991)
"Pinch"	short story	The American Voice (Summer 1987)	The Assignation (1988)	
"The Others"	short story	The Twilight Zone Magazine (August 1987)	The Assignation (1988)	Anthologized in Triumph of the Night: Tales of Terror and the Supernatural by 20th Century Masters (1989) and The Omnibus of 20th Century Ghost Stories (1992)
"Capital Punishment"	short story	The Southern Review (Autumn 1987)	Heat and Other Stories (1991)	
"House Hunting"	short story	The Kenyon Review (Fall 1987)	Heat and Other Stories (1991)	Anthologized in Prize Stories 1989: The O. Henry Awards (1989)
"The Abduction"	short story	Seventeen (November 1987)	The Assignation (1988)	
"First Marriage"	short story	Words International (November 1987)	Uncollected	
"Desire"	short story	Exile (Winter 1987)	The Assignation (1988)	Included in Oates in Exile (1990)
"Train"	short story	Exile (Winter 1987)	The Assignation (1988)	Included in Oates in Exile (1990)
"Sundays in Summer"	short story	Michigan Quarterly Review (Winter 1987)	Heat and Other Stories (1991)	
"Yarrow"	short story	TriQuarterly (Winter 1987)	Heat and Other Stories (1991)	Anthologized in Prize Stories 1988: The O. Henry Awards (1988); reprinted in TriQuarterly (Spring/Summer 1990); included in Extenuating Circumstances: Stories of Crime and Suspense (2022)

=== 1988 ===
Title	Type	Originally published in	Collected in	Notes
"Bad Habits"	short story	The Assignation (1988)	The Assignation (1988)	
"A Touch of the Flu"	short story	Fiction Network (1988)	The Assignation (1988)	
"White Trash"	short story	Lord John Ten: A Celebration (1988)	Heat and Other Stories (1991)	
"The Assignation"	short story	Antaeus (Spring 1988)	The Assignation (1988)	
"The Boyfriend"	short story	The Massachusetts Review (Spring 1988)	Heat and Other Stories (1991)	
"Eleutheria"	short story	Fiction International (Spring 1988)	The Assignation (1988)	
"Secret"	short story	Fiction International (Spring 1988)	The Assignation (1988)	Included in Twelve Plays (1991)
"Itch"	short story	Fiction International (Spring 1988)	Uncollected	
"Stroke"	short story	The Malahat Review (Spring 1988)	The Assignation (1988)	
"Face"	short story	The Malahat Review (Spring 1988)	The Assignation (1988)	
"August Evening"	short story	The Malahat Review (Spring 1988)	The Assignation (1988)	
"Geese"	short story	Ploughshares (Spring 1988)	Uncollected	
"The Bystander"	short story	Queen's Quarterly (Summer 1988)	The Assignation (1988)	
"Getting to Know All About You"	short story	The Southern Review (Summer 1988)	Heat and Other Stories (1991)	
"Death Valley"	short story	Esquire (July 1988)	Heat and Other Stories (1991)	Included in Extenuating Circumstances: Stories of Crime and Suspense (2022)
"Party"	short story	Boston Review (August 1988)	The Assignation (1988)	Anthologized in The Pushcart Prize XIV: Best of the Small Presses (1990)
"The Track"	short story	GQ (September 1988)	Will You Always Love Me? And Other Stories (1996)	
"The Stadium"	short story	Omni (October 1988)	The Assignation (1988)	
"Beauty Salon"	short story	The Gettysburg Review (Autumn 1988)	Where Is Here? (1992)	
"Picnic"	short story	High Plains Literary Review (Fall 1988)	The Assignation (1988)	
"The Quarrel"	short story	Exile (Fall 1988)	The Assignation (1988)	Included in Oates in Exile (1990)
"Two Doors"	short story	Exile (Fall 1988)	The Assignation (1988)	Original title "The Doors"; included in Oates in Exile (1990)
"Visitation Rights"	short story	TriQuarterly (Fall 1988)	The Assignation (1988)	
"Foster Home"	short story	Virginia Quarterly Review (Winter 1988)	Uncollected	
"Naked"	short story	Witness (Winter 1988)	Heat and Other Stories (1991)	

=== 1989 ===
Title	Type	Originally published in	Collected in	Notes
"Blue Skies"	short story	The Invisible Enemy: Alcoholism and the Modern Short Story (1989)	Uncollected	
"The Wig"	short story	New Directions 53 (1989)	Where Is Here? (1992)	
"Biopsy"	short story	New Directions 53 (1989)	Where Is Here? (1992)	
"Bad News"	short story	New Directions 53 (1989)	Uncollected	
"Hostage"	short story	Louder Than Words (1989)	Heat and Other Stories (1991)	
"Craps"	short story	Boulevard (1989)	Heat and Other Stories (1991)	Anthologized in Blowout in Little Man Flats and Other Spine-Tingling Stories of Murder in the West (1998) and one other; included in Extenuating Circumstances: Stories of Crime and Suspense (2022)
"Leila Lee"	short story	Northwest Review (1989)	Heat and Other Stories (1991)	
"Tell Me Everything You Know"	short story	Crosscurrents (1989)	Uncollected	
"Home"	short story	Ladies' Home Journal (January 1989)	Uncollected	
"Kindness"	short story	Ladies' Home Journal (May 1989)	Uncollected	
"Shot"	short story	The Ohio Review (Spring 1989)	Where Is Here? (1992)	Reprinted in Seventeen (June 1990), Literary Cavalcade (April 1998) and The Ohio Review (2001); included in Small Avalanches and Other Stories (2003)
"Heat"	short story	The Paris Review (Spring 1989)	Heat and Other Stories (1991)	Anthologized in Prize Stories 1990: The O. Henry Awards (1990) and three others; included in High Lonesome: New & Selected Stories (2006)
"Cave of Ten Thousand Sacrifices"	short story	Mānoa (Spring–Fall 1989)	Uncollected	
"The Date"	short story	Savvy Woman (July 1989)	Where Is Here? (1992)	
"The Damnation of A-- K--"	short story	Fantasy & Science Fiction (August 1989)	Uncollected	
"Embrace"	short story	Western Humanities Review (Autumn 1989)	Where Is Here? (1992)	
"The Handclasp"	short story	The Kenyon Review (Fall 1989)	Will You Always Love Me? And Other Stories (1996)	
"The Crying Baby"	short story	New England Review and Bread Loaf Quarterly (Winter 1989)	Heat and Other Stories (1991)	Reprinted in New England Review (Winter 1993)
"Abandoned"	short story	Western Humanities Review (Winter 1989)	Where Is Here? (1992)	
"Cuckold"	short story	Western Humanities Review (Winter 1989)	Where Is Here? (1992)	Included in Twelve Plays (1991)
"Emergency"	short story	The Antioch Review (Winter 1989)	Uncollected	
"Family"	short story	Omni (December 1989)	Heat and Other Stories (1991)	Anthologized in The Year's Best Fantasy and Horror: Third Annual Collection (1990) and two others; included in Extenuating Circumstances: Stories of Crime and Suspense (2022)
"The Swimmers"	short story	Playboy (December 1989)	Heat and Other Stories (1991)	Anthologized in Prize Stories 1991: The O. Henry Awards (1991); included in High Lonesome: New & Selected Stories (2006)

== 1990s ==
=== 1990 ===
Title	Type	Originally published in	Collected in	Notes
"First Pro Fight"	short story	Words On the Page, the World In Your Hands: Book Three (1990)	Uncollected	Excerpt from On Boxing (1987)
"Pregnant"	short story	Skin of the Soul: New Horror Stories by Women (1990)	Uncollected	
"Man Who Wasn't There"	short story	Boulevard (1990)	Uncollected	
"Morning"	short story	Arete (January/February 1990)	Heat and Other Stories (1991)	
"American, Abroad"	short story	North American Review (March 1990)	Will You Always Love Me? And Other Stories (1996)	Anthologized in The Best American Short Stories 1991 (1991)
"Passion"	short story	GQ (March 1990)	Heat and Other Stories (1991)	
"How Do You Like Your Meat?"	short story	Michigan Quarterly Review (Spring 1990)	Uncollected	Included in Twelve Plays (1991); reprinted in Michigan Quarterly Review (Winter 2021)
"The Maker of Parables"	short story	The Kenyon Review (Spring 1990)	Where Is Here? (1992)	
"Friday Night"	short story	Antaeus (Spring/Autumn 1990)	Uncollected	Included in Twelve Plays (1991)
"The Hair"	short story	Partisan Review (Summer 1990)	Heat and Other Stories (1991)	Anthologized in The Pushcart Prize XVI: Best of the Small Presses (1991); included in High Lonesome: New & Selected Stories (2006)
"Why Don't You Come Live With Me It's Time"	short story	Tikkun (July/August 1990)	Heat and Other Stories (1991)	Anthologized in Prize Stories 1992: The O. Henry Awards (1992) and one other; included in Small Avalanches and Other Stories (2003) and Extenuating Circumstances: Stories of Crime and Suspense (2022)
"Angry"	short story	New York Woman (August 1990)	Where Is Here? (1992)	Original title "Anger"
"Ladies and Gentlemen:"	short story	Harper's Magazine (December 1990)	Heat and Other Stories (1991)	Anthologized in The Year's Best Fantasy and Horror: Fourth Annual Collection (1991); included in Twelve Plays (1991) and Extenuating Circumstances: Stories of Crime and Suspense (2022)

=== 1991 ===
Title	Type	Originally published in	Collected in	Notes
"Act of Solitude"	short story	AGNI (1991)	Will You Always Love Me? And Other Stories (1996)	
"Imperial Presidency"	short story	Boulevard (1991)	Where Is Here? (1992)	Included in Twelve Plays (1991)
"Goose Girl"	short story	Fiction (1991)	Will You Always Love Me? And Other Stories (1996)	Anthologized in Prize Stories 1993: The O. Henry Awards (1993)
"Letter, Lover"	short story	Fiction (1991)	Where Is Here? (1992)	
"Insomnia"	short story	Onthebus (1991)	Where Is Here? (1992)	
"Area Man Found Crucified"	short story	The Southern California Anthology (1991)	Where Is Here? (1992)	Reprinted in The Southern California Anthology (1993, 1998)
"The Buck"	short story	Story (1991)	Heat and Other Stories (1991)	Included in Extenuating Circumstances: Stories of Crime and Suspense (2022)
"Where Is Here?"	short story	American Short Fiction (Spring 1991)	Where Is Here? (1992)	
"The Escape"	short story	TriQuarterly (Spring/Summer 1991)	Where Is Here? (1992)	
"The Face of Injury"	short story	Syracuse University Magazine (March 1991)	Uncollected	Excerpt from The Rise of Life on Earth (1991)
"Forgive Me!"	short story	Michigan Quarterly Review (Summer 1991)	Where Is Here? (1992)	
"The Guilty Party"	short story	Glamour (July 1991)	Haunted: Tales of the Grotesque (1994)	
"Is Laughter Contagious?"	short story	Harper's Magazine (September 1991)	Will You Always Love Me? And Other Stories (1996)	Anthologized in The Best American Short Stories 1992 (1992)
"Black Water"	short story	Lear's (September 1991)	Uncollected	Excerpt from Black Water (1992)
"Actress"	short story	Michigan Quarterly Review (Fall 1991)	Where Is Here? (1992)	
"Lethal"	short story	Ontario Review (Fall/Winter 1991–92)	Where Is Here? (1992)	Included in Twelve Plays (1991); anthologized in Telling Stories: An Anthology for Writers (1998)
"Life After High School"	short story	The Atlantic (November 1991)	Will You Always Love Me? And Other Stories (1996)	Included in Small Avalanches and Other Stories (2003) and High Lonesome: New & Selected Stories (2006)

=== 1992 ===
Title	Type	Originally published in	Collected in	Notes
"Hammerklavier"	short story	Fiction (1992)	Uncollected	
"Work-in-Progress"	short story	God: An Anthology of Fiction (1992)	Uncollected	
"The False Mirror"	short story	Where Is Here? (1992)	Where Is Here? (1992)	
"Love, Forever"	short story	Where Is Here? (1992)	Where Is Here? (1992)	
"Murder"	short story	Where Is Here? (1992)	Where Is Here? (1992)	
"Old Dog"	short story	Where Is Here? (1992)	Where Is Here? (1992)	
"Extenuating Circumstances"	short story	Sisters in Crime 5 (1992)	Haunted: Tales of the Grotesque (1994)	Anthologized in The Big Book of Female Detectives (2018); included in Extenuating Circumstances: Stories of Crime and Suspense (2022)
"Martyrdom"	short story	MetaHorror (1992)	Haunted: Tales of the Grotesque (1994)	Anthologized in The Year's Best Fantasy and Horror: Sixth Annual Collection (1993)
"Running"	short story	Self (March 1992)	Where Is Here? (1992)	
"Schroeder's Stepfather"	short story	Ellery Queen's Mystery Magazine (April 1992)	The Collector of Hearts: New Tales of the Grotesque (1998)	
"The Artist"	short story	Omni (May 1992)	Where Is Here? (1992)	
"Poor Bibi"	short story	Tikkun (May/June 1992)	Haunted: Tales of the Grotesque (1994)	Original title "Poor Thing"; reprinted in Tikkun (Summer 2016); included in Extenuating Circumstances: Stories of Crime and Suspense (2022)
"You Can't Catch Me"	short story	Mānoa (Spring 1992)	Uncollected	As Rosamond Smith; excerpt from You Can't Catch Me (1995)
"Don't You Trust Me?"	short story	Glamour (August 1992)	Haunted: Tales of the Grotesque (1994)	Anthologized as graphic novel in Sexy Chix: Anthology of Women Cartoonists (2006) and Drawing Lines: An Anthology of Women Cartoonists (2020)
"Widow"	short story	The Southern Review (Summer 1992)	Uncollected	
"The Model"	short story	Ellery Queen's Mystery Magazine (October 1992)	Haunted: Tales of the Grotesque (1994)	Anthologized in The Best American Mystery Stories 1993 (1993); included in Small Avalanches and Other Stories (2003) and Extenuating Circumstances: Stories of Crime and Suspense (2022)
"Bare Legs"	short story	The Yale Review (October 1992)	Where Is Here? (1992)	
"Sweet!"	short story	Antaeus (Autumn 1992)	Where Is Here? (1992)	
"Depot"	short story	American Short Fiction (Fall 1992)	Uncollected	
"Gulf War"	short story	Boulevard (Fall 1992)	Uncollected	
"The Premonition"	short story	Playboy (December 1992)	Haunted: Tales of the Grotesque (1994)	
"The Ice Pick"	short story	Raritan (Winter 1992)	Where Is Here? (1992)	

=== 1993 ===
Title	Type	Originally published in	Collected in	Notes
"Bad Touch"	short story	AGNI (1993)	Uncollected	
"Phase Change"	short story	Omni Visions One (1993)	Haunted: Tales of the Grotesque (1994)	
"Politics"	short story	Cosmopolitan (May 1993)	Will You Always Love Me? And Other Stories (1996)	
"The Radio Astronomer"	short story	Antaeus (Spring 1993)	Haunted: Tales of the Grotesque (1994)	
"The Girl Who Was to Die"	short story	The Gettysburg Review (Spring 1993)	Will You Always Love Me? And Other Stories (1996)	Included in Extenuating Circumstances: Stories of Crime and Suspense (2022)
"The Missing Person"	short story	Glimmer Train (Summer 1993)	Will You Always Love Me? And Other Stories (1996)	
"The Passion of Rydcie Mather"	short story	American Short Fiction (Summer 1993)	Will You Always Love Me? And Other Stories (1996)	
"Thanksgiving"	short story	Omni (November 1993)	Haunted: Tales of the Grotesque (1994)	
"The Lost Child"	short story	Michigan Quarterly Review (Fall 1993)	Will You Always Love Me? And Other Stories (1996)	
"Mistaken Identity"	short story	New England Review (Fall 1993)	Uncollected	
"You Petted Me, and I Followed You Home"	short story	TriQuarterly (Fall 1993)	Will You Always Love Me? And Other Stories (1996)	Anthologized in Prize Stories 1995: The O. Henry Awards (1995)
"Accursed Inhabitants of the House of Bly"	short story	The Antioch Review (Winter 1993)	Haunted: Tales of the Grotesque (1994)	
"The Night Nurse"	short story	Ploughshares (Winter 1993–94)	Uncollected	

=== 1994 ===
Title	Type	Originally published in	Collected in	Notes
"Elvis Is Dead: Why Are You Alive?"	short story	The King Is Dead: Tales of Elvis Postmortem (1994)	The Collector of Hearts: New Tales of the Grotesque (1998)	
"Fever Blisters"	short story	Little Deaths: 24 Tales of Horror and Sex (1994)	The Collector of Hearts: New Tales of the Grotesque (1998)	
"Will You Always Love Me?"	short story	Will You Always Love Me? (1994)	Will You Always Love Me? And Other Stories (1996)	Originally published as standalone limited edition book; anthologized in The Best American Mystery Stories 1997 (1997); included in High Lonesome: New & Selected Stories (2006)
"An Urban Paradox"	short story	Witness (1994)	Demon and Other Tales (1996)	Included in The Collector of Hearts: New Tales of the Grotesque (1998); anthologized in Unforgettable Ghost Stories by Women Writers (2008)
"The Journey"	short story	SoHo Journal (1994–95)	Demon and Other Tales (1996)	Included in The Collector of Hearts: New Tales of the Grotesque (1998)
"June Birthing"	short story	Cosmopolitan (February 1994)	Will You Always Love Me? And Other Stories (1996)	
"A Theory of (Unmarked) Municipal Vehicles"	short story	Trafika (Spring 1994)	Uncollected	
"The Undesirable Table"	short story	Raritan (Spring 1994)	Will You Always Love Me? And Other Stories (1996)	Anthologized in The Pushcart Prize XX: Best of the Small Presses (1995); included in Extenuating Circumstances: Stories of Crime and Suspense (2022)
"Posthumous"	short story	Ellery Queen's Mystery Magazine (June 1994)	Demon and Other Tales (1996)	Included in The Collector of Hearts: New Tales of the Grotesque (1998); anthologized in 100 Menacing Little Murder Stories (1998)
"Blind"	short story	Worlds of Fantasy & Horror (Summer 1994)	Haunted: Tales of the Grotesque (1994)	
"What I Lived For"	short story	Playboy (September 1994)	Uncollected	Excerpt from What I Lived For (1994)
"Zombie"	short story	The New Yorker (October 24, 1994)	Uncollected	Excerpt from Zombie (1995)
"The Brothers"	short story	Ellery Queen's Mystery Magazine (November 1994)	Will You Always Love Me? And Other Stories (1996)	Anthologized in The Year's Best Fantasy and Horror: Eighth Annual Collection (1995)
"The Mark of Satan"	short story	Antaeus (Autumn 1994)	Will You Always Love Me? And Other Stories (1996)	Anthologized in Prize Stories 1996: The O. Henry Awards (1996) and The Art of the Story (1999); included in High Lonesome: New & Selected Stories (2006)
"Christmas Night 1962"	short story	TriQuarterly (Fall 1994)	Will You Always Love Me? And Other Stories (1996)	
"Fever"	short story	Columbia (Winter 1994)	Uncollected	
"The Stalker"	short story	Exile (Winter 1994)	Faithless: Tales of Transgression (2001)	Anthologized in Unusual Suspects: An Anthology of Crime Stories from Black Lizard (1996)

=== 1995 ===
Title	Type	Originally published in	Collected in	Notes
"████"	short story	Fear Itself (1995)	The Collector of Hearts: New Tales of the Grotesque (1998)	Anthologized in The Year's Best Fantasy and Horror: Ninth Annual Collection (1996) and Darkness: Two Decades of Modern Horror (2010)
"The Crossing"	short story	Ruby Slippers, Golden Tears (1995)	The Collector of Hearts: New Tales of the Grotesque (1998)	
"The Hand-Puppet"	short story	David Copperfield's Tales of the Impossible (1995)	The Collector of Hearts: New Tales of the Grotesque (1998)	Included in Extenuating Circumstances: Stories of Crime and Suspense (2022)
"Gulf War"	play	The Perfectionist and Other Plays (1995)	The Perfectionist and Other Plays (1995)	
"Here She Is!"	play	The Perfectionist and Other Plays (1995)	The Perfectionist and Other Plays (1995)	
"Negative"	play	The Perfectionist and Other Plays (1995)	The Perfectionist and Other Plays (1995)	
"The Perfectionist"	play	The Perfectionist and Other Plays (1995)	The Perfectionist and Other Plays (1995)	
"Bad Girls"	short story	Boulevard (Spring 1995)	Small Avalanches and Other Stories (2003)	Anthologized in The Norton Anthology of Contemporary Fiction: Second Edition (1998)
"The Hands"	short story	Epoch (1995)	Demon and Other Tales (1996)	Included in The Collector of Hearts: New Tales of the Grotesque (1998)
"Accursed"	short story	The Threepenny Review (Spring 1995)	Uncollected	Excerpt from The Crosswicks Horror, published as The Accursed (2013)
"Death Astride Bicycle"	short story	Western Humanities Review (Spring 1995)	The Collector of Hearts: New Tales of the Grotesque (1998)	
"Labor Day"	short story	Western Humanities Review (Spring 1995)	The Collector of Hearts: New Tales of the Grotesque (1998)	
"The Omen"	short story	Blood & Aphorisms (Spring 1995)	Demon and Other Tales (1996)	Included in The Collector of Hearts: New Tales of the Grotesque (1998)
"The Temple"	short story	Blood & Aphorisms (Spring 1995)	Demon and Other Tales (1996)	Anthologized in American Gothic Tales (1996); included in The Collector of Hearts: New Tales of the Grotesque (1998)
"Good to Know You"	short story	Western Humanities Review (Summer 1995)	Will You Always Love Me? And Other Stories (1996)	
"Death Mother"	short story	The Kenyon Review (Summer–Fall 1995)	The Collector of Hearts: New Tales of the Grotesque (1998)	Anthologized in Snapshots: 20th Century Mother–Daughter Fiction (2000) and The Best of The Kenyon Review (2003)
"Intensive"	short story	The Gettysburg Review (Autumn 1995)	The Collector of Hearts: New Tales of the Grotesque (1998)	
"The Affliction"	short story	Bomb (Fall 1995)	The Collector of Hearts: New Tales of the Grotesque (1998)	
"The Adoption"	play	Conjunctions (Fall 1995)	New Plays (1998)	
"Ghost Girls"	short story	American Short Fiction (Fall 1995)	Uncollected	Excerpt from Man Crazy (1997); anthologized in The Best American Short Stories 1996 (1996) and The Scribner Anthology of Contemporary Short Fiction (1999)
"The Revenge of the Foot, 1970"	short story	Salmagundi (Fall 1995)	Will You Always Love Me? And Other Stories (1996)	Included in Extenuating Circumstances: Stories of Crime and Suspense (2022)
"The Vision"	short story	Michigan Quarterly Review (Winter 1995)	Will You Always Love Me? And Other Stories (1996)	
"The Easy Lay"	short story	Ploughshares (Winter 1995–96)	Uncollected	Excerpt from Man Crazy (1997)
"Marsena Sportsman's Club"	short story	TriQuarterly (Winter 1995/96)	Uncollected	Excerpt from Man Crazy (1997)

=== 1996 ===
Title	Type	Originally published in	Collected in	Notes
"Boy Looking Into Infinity"	short story	AGNI (1996)	Uncollected	
"The Ceremony"	short story	The Southern California Anthology (1996)	Uncollected	
"The Floating Hospital"	short story	The Southern California Anthology (1996)	Uncollected	
"Leave Me Alone God Damn You"	short story	Lethal Kisses: 19 Stories of Sex, Horror & Revenge (1996)	Uncollected	
"At the Paradise Motel, Sparks, Nevada"	short story	Murder for Love (1996)	Uncollected	Excerpt from Starr Bright Will Be with You Soon (1999)
"Nobody Knows My Name"	short story	Twists of the Tale: An Anthology of Cat Horror (1996)	The Corn Maiden and Other Nightmares (2011)	
"The Dream-Catcher"	short story	Off Limits: Tales of Alien Sex (1996)	The Collector of Hearts: New Tales of the Grotesque (1998)	
"Unprintable"	short story	Mother: Famous Writers Celebrate Motherhood with a Treasury of Short Stories, Essays, and Poems (1996)	The Collector of Hearts: New Tales of the Grotesque (1998)	
"Demon"	short story	Demon and Other Tales (1996)	Demon and Other Tales (1996)	Included in The Collector of Hearts: New Tales of the Grotesque (1998) and High Crime Area: Tales of Darkness and Dread (2014)
"Acapulco Gold"	short story	The Gettysburg Review (Spring 1996)	Uncollected	
"The Sepulchre"	short story	DoubleTake (Spring 1996)	The Collector of Hearts: New Tales of the Grotesque (1998)	
"We Were Worried About You"	short story	Boulevard (Spring 1996)	Faithless: Tales of Transgression (2001)	
"Gorgeous"	short story	The Southern Review (Summer 1996)	Uncollected	Excerpt from Man Crazy (1997)
"Physical"	short story	Playboy (August 1996)	Faithless: Tales of Transgression (2001)	
"Tell Me of Your Life"	short story	Celestial Timepiece: A Joyce Carol Oates Home Page (November 18, 1996)	Uncollected	Published online; prologue to Man Crazy (1997)
"See You in Your Dreams"	short story	The Southern Review (Winter 1996)	Uncollected	Excerpt from Man Crazy (1997)

=== 1997 ===
Title	Type	Originally published in	Collected in	Notes
"A Manhattan Romance"	short story	The Time Out Book of New York Short Stories (1997)	Faithless: Tales of Transgression (2001)	Reprinted in American Short Fiction (Winter 1997); anthologized in Manhattan Noir 2: The Classics (2008)
"A Woman Is Born to Bleed"	short story	Sex, Drugs, Rock'n'Roll: Stories to End the Century (1997)	Uncollected	
"In the Insomniac Night"	short story	Black Swan, White Raven (1997)	Uncollected	
"Starr Bright Will Be with You Soon!"	short story	Hot Blood: Crimes of Passion (1997)	Uncollected	Excerpt from Starr Bright Will Be with You Soon (1999)
"Man Crazy"	short story	Blind Spot (1997)	Uncollected	Excerpt from Man Crazy (1997)
"Scars"	short story	Artes International (1997)	The Collector of Hearts: New Tales of the Grotesque (1998)	
"The Sky Blue Ball"	short story	Ellery Queen's Mystery Magazine (January 1997)	The Collector of Hearts: New Tales of the Grotesque (1998)	Original title "The Sky-Blue Ball"; anthologized in The Year's Best Fantasy and Horror: Eleventh Annual Collection (1998); included in Small Avalanches and Other Stories (2003)
"From The Negro-Lover"	short story	Conjunctions (Spring 1997)	Uncollected	Excerpt from The Negro-Lover, published as I'll Take You There (2002)
"The Penitent"	short story	Fiction (1997)	Uncollected	Excerpt from The Negro-Lover, published as I'll Take You There (2002)
"Lover"	short story	Granta (Summer 1997)	Faithless: Tales of Transgression (2001)	Anthologized in Master's Choice: Volume II (2000)
"Ugly"	short story	The Paris Review (Summer 1997)	Faithless: Tales of Transgression (2001)	Original title "Ugly Girl"; collected revised
"Fugitive"	short story	The Yale Review (July 1997)	I Am No One You Know: Stories (2004)	
"Death Cup"	short story	Ellery Queen's Mystery Magazine (August 1997)	The Corn Maiden and Other Nightmares (2011)	Anthlogized in The Year's 25 Finest Crime & Mystery Stories: 7th Annual Edition (1998)
"Lost Kittens"	short story	TriQuarterly (Fall 1997)	Uncollected	Excerpt from Man Crazy (1997)
"The Wake"	short story	Ploughshares (Fall 1997)	Uncollected	
"Deathwatch"	short story	Story (Winter 1997)	Faithless: Tales of Transgression (2001)	Original title "Death Watch"
"Faithless"	short story	The Kenyon Review (Winter 1997)	Faithless: Tales of Transgression (2001)	Anthologized in The Best American Mystery Stories 1998 (1998) and The Pushcart Prize XXIII: Best of the Small Presses (1999)
"Valentine"	short story	Michigan Quarterly Review (Winter 1997)	The Collector of Hearts: New Tales of the Grotesque (1998)	Anthologized in Buffalo Noir (2015); included in Extenuating Circumstances: Stories of Crime and Suspense (2022)

=== 1998 ===
Title	Type	Originally published in	Collected in	Notes
"Color Blind"	short story	The Best of the Best: 18 New Stories by America's Leading Authors (1998)	Uncollected	
"First Love"	short story	A Few Thousand Words About Love (1998)	Uncollected	Excerpt from The Negro-Lover, published as I'll Take You There (2002)
"(A Diptych)"	short story	Hover (1998)	Uncollected	
"(The Salvation of the Grass): A Parable"	short story	Hover (1998)	Uncollected	
"Broke Heart Blues"	short story	Sirens and Other Daemon Lovers (1998)	Uncollected	Excerpt from Broke Heart Blues (1999)
"Murder-Two"	short story	Murder for Revenge (1998)	Faithless: Tales of Transgression (2001)	Anthologized in Master's Choice: Mystery Stories by Today's Top Writers and the Masters Who Inspired Them (1999)
"What Then, My Life?"	short story	Fiction (1998)	Faithless: Tales of Transgression (2001)	
"The Collector of Hearts"	short story	Seventeen (May 1998)	The Collector of Hearts: New Tales of the Grotesque (1998)	Included in Extenuating Circumstances: Stories of Crime and Suspense (2022)
"From The Negro-Lover: The Way Out"	short story	TriQuarterly (Spring 1998)	Uncollected	Excerpt from The Negro-Lover, published as I'll Take You There (2002)
"The Scarf"	short story	Ploughshares (Spring 1998)	Faithless: Tales of Transgression (2001)	
"The Sons of Angus MacElster"	short story	Conjunctions (Spring 1998)	The Collector of Hearts: New Tales of the Grotesque (1998)	Included in Extenuating Circumstances: Stories of Crime and Suspense (2022)
"The Princess Who Died in Old Muirkirk"	short story	Five Points: A Journal of Literature and Art (Spring/Summer 1998)	Uncollected	Excerpt from My Heart Laid Bare (1998)
"Shadows of the Evening"	short story	Century (Summer 1998)	The Collector of Hearts: New Tales of the Grotesque (1998)	Anthologized in Dreams from the Witch House: Female Voices of Lovecraftian Horror (2015)
"Feral"	short story	Fantasy & Science Fiction (September 1998)	The Museum of Dr. Moses (2007)	
"Fast Forward"	short story	The Yale Review (October 1998)	Uncollected	
"Secret, Silent"	short story	Boulevard (Fall 1998)	Faithless: Tales of Transgression (2001)	Anthologized in The Best American Mystery Stories 1999 (1999)
"The Last Man of Letters"	short story	Playboy (December 1998)	High Crime Area: Tales of Darkness and Dread (2014)	
"The Kiss"	short story	Inquirer Magazine (December 20, 1998)	Uncollected	Excerpt from Blonde (2000)

=== 1999 ===
Title	Type	Originally published in	Collected in	Notes
"The Ruins of Contracoeur"	short story	999: New Stories of Horror and Suspense (1999)	The Ruins of Contracoeur and Other Presences (2021)	
"Tusk"	short story	Irreconcilable Differences (1999)	Faithless: Tales of Transgression (2001)	
"The Vampire"	short story	Murder and Obsession (1999)	Faithless: Tales of Transgression (2001)	
"Au Sable"	short story	Harper's Magazine (February 1999)	Faithless: Tales of Transgression (2001)	
"The Box Artist"	short story	Conjunctions (Spring 1999)	Uncollected	Anthologized in A Convergence of Birds (2001)
"Summer Sweat"	short story	Playboy (August 1999)	Faithless: Tales of Transgression (2001)	
"The Barter"	short story	Story (Autumn 1999)	Sourland: Stories (2010)	
"Hummingbird"	short story	Michigan Quarterly Review (Fall 1999)	Uncollected	Excerpt from Blonde (2000)
"In *COPLAND*"	short story	Boulevard (Fall 1999)	Faithless: Tales of Transgression (2001)	
"The Dark Prince"	short story	Ellery Queen's Mystery Magazine (November 1999)	Uncollected	Excerpt from Blonde (2000)
"The Sharpshooter"	short story	Conjunctions (Winter 1999)	Uncollected	Excerpt from Blonde (2000); anthologized in The Pushcart Prize XXV: Best of the Small Presses (2001)
"The Blond Actress Rehearses Chekhov"	play	The Massachusetts Review (Winter 1999/2000)	Uncollected	

== 2000s ==
=== 2000 ===
Title	Type	Originally published in	Collected in	Notes
"You, Little Match-girl"	short story	Black Heart, Ivory Bones (2000)	Uncollected	
"The Beat Reporter"	short story	Fiction (2000)	Uncollected	
"The Girl with the Blackened Eye"	short story	Witness (2000)	I Am No One You Know: Stories (2004)	Anthologized in The Best American Mystery Stories 2001 (2001) and Prize Stories 2001: The O. Henry Awards (2001)
"Words"	short story	The Yale Review (April 2000)	Uncollected	Excerpt from Blonde (2000)
"The Little Sacrifice"	short story	Conjunctions (Spring 2000)	Uncollected	Anthologized as "A Dark Fable" in Shadow: Touching the Darkness Within (2002) and under its original title in 666: The Number of the Beast (2007)
"Prevailing Faith in 'Free Will'"	short story	Conjunctions (Spring 2000)	Uncollected	
"The Revelation"	short story	Conjunctions (Spring 2000)	Uncollected	
"There Will Come That Evening"	short story	Conjunctions (Spring 2000)	Uncollected	
"The Playwright and the Blond Actress"	play	Ploughshares (Spring 2000)	Uncollected	
"In Shock"	short story	Fantasy & Science Fiction (June 2000)	Uncollected	
"The Vigil"	short story	Harper's Magazine (July 2000)	Faithless: Tales of Transgression (2001)	
"Happiness"	short story	Ellery Queen's Mystery Magazine (August 2000)	I Am No One You Know: Stories (2004)	Anthologized in The World's Finest Mystery and Crime Stories: Second Annual Collection (2001)
"Gunlove"	short story	Boulevard (Fall 2000)	Faithless: Tales of Transgression (2001)	
"Strand Used Books 1956"	short story	Exile (Fall 2000)	Uncollected	Excerpt from Blonde (2000); anthologized in Retro Retro: Fictional Flashbacks (2000); slightly revised as "Three Girls" (2002)
"Wolf's Head Lake"	short story	Salmagundi (Fall 2000)	I Am No One You Know: Stories (2004)	
"Pin-up 1945"	short story	TriQuarterly (Winter, Spring/Summer 2000)	Uncollected	Excerpt from Blonde (2000)

=== 2001 ===
Title	Type	Originally published in	Collected in	Notes
"The Man Who Fought Roland LaStarza"	short story	Murder on the Ropes: Original Boxing Mysteries (2001)	The Museum of Dr. Moses (2007)	
"The Museum of Dr. Moses"	short story	The Museum of Horrors (2001)	The Museum of Dr. Moses (2007)	
"Commencement"	short story	Redshift: Extreme Visions of Speculative Fiction (2001)	The Ruins of Contracoeur and Other Presences (2021)	Anthologized in Lovecraft Unbound (2009)
"The High School Sweetheart: A Mystery"	short story	Playboy (January 2001)	Faithless: Tales of Transgression (2001)	Original title "The High School Sweetheart"
"21 Epiphanies on the Great Egg"	short story	Conjunctions (Spring 2001)	Uncollected	
"In Hiding"	short story	Michigan Quarterly Review (Spring 2001)	I Am No One You Know: Stories (2004)	
"Curly Red"	short story	Harper's Magazine (April 2001)	I Am No One You Know: Stories (2004)	Excerpt from My Life as a Rat (2019)
"Testimony"	short story	The Spook (August 2001)	Uncollected	
"The Fossil-Seeker"	short story	Conjunctions (Fall 2001)	Uncollected	Excerpt from The Falls (2004)
"The Instructor"	short story	Salmagundi (Fall 2001)	I Am No One You Know: Stories (2004)	Anthologized in Pushcart Prize XXVII: Best of the Small Presses (2003)
"Miss Golden Dreams 1949"	play	Prairie Schooner (Fall 2001)	Uncollected	Revised as short story (2021)
"The Suicide Note: Nine Ecstacies of the Soul"	play	Boulevard (Fall 2001)	Uncollected	
"Tell Me You Forgive Me?"	short story	Ellery Queen's Mystery Magazine (September/October 2001)	The Female of the Species: Tales of Mystery and Suspense (2005)	
"Angel of Mercy"	short story	The Spook (October 2001)	The Female of the Species: Tales of Mystery and Suspense (2005)	
"Hunger"	short story	Alfred Hitchcock's Mystery Magazine (November 2001)	The Female of the Species: Tales of Mystery and Suspense (2005)	
"Me & Wolfie, 1979"	short story	AGNI (Winter–Spring 2001)	I Am No One You Know: Stories (2004)	
"The Mutants"	short story	The Observer (December 23, 2001)	I Am No One You Know: Stories (2004)	Reprinted in Fiction (2002)

=== 2002 ===
Title	Type	Originally published in	Collected in	Notes
"Centerfold"	short story	All the Available Light: A Marilyn Monroe Reader (2002)	Uncollected	
"I'm Not Your Son, I Am No One You Know"	short story	Witness (2002)	I Am No One You Know: Stories (2004)	
"Aiding & Abetting"	short story	Playboy (January 2002)	I Am No One You Know: Stories (2004)	
"The Beneficiary"	short story	Blind Spot (Spring 2002)	Uncollected	Excerpt from The Beneficiary, published as The Tattooed Girl (2003)
"Upholstery"	short story	The New Yorker (March 18, 2002)	I Am No One You Know: Stories (2004)	
"Broke Heart Blues"	short story	Literary Cavalcade (May 2002)	Uncollected	Excerpt from Broke Heart Blues (1999)
"The Skull: A Love Story"	short story	Harper's Magazine (May 2002)	I Am No One You Know: Stories (2004)	Original title "The Skull"; anthologized in The Best American Mystery Stories 2003 (2003)
"Stonecrop"	short story	Raritan (Summer 2002)	Uncollected	Excerpt from The Falls (2004)
"Angel of Wrath"	short story	Ellery Queen's Mystery Magazine (June 2002)	The Female of the Species: Tales of Mystery and Suspense (2005)	
"The Fruit Cellar"	short story	New Statesman (July 15, 2002)	Uncollected	Reprinted in Ellery Queen's Mystery Magazine (March/April 2004)
"Jorie (& Jamie): A Deposition"	short story	New Statesman (September 9, 2002)	I Am No One You Know: Stories (2004)	Original title "Jorie (& Jamie)"; reprinted in The Yale Review (July 2003)
"Cumberland Breakdown"	short story	Boulevard (Fall 2002)	I Am No One You Know: Stories (2004)	
"Three Girls"	short story	The Georgia Review (Fall 2002)	I Am No One You Know: Stories (2004)	Slightly revised version of "Strand Used Books 1956" (2000); anthologized in The Best American Magazine Writing 2003 (2003) and two others
"Madison at Guignol"	short story	The Kenyon Review (Winter 2002)	The Female of the Species: Tales of Mystery and Suspense (2005)	
"Soft Core"	short story	Granta (Winter 2002)	High Lonesome: New & Selected Stories (2006)	
"The Deaths: An Elegy"	short story	Ellery Queen's Mystery Magazine (December 2002)	I Am No One You Know: Stories (2004)	Original title "The Deaths"
"The Twins: A Mystery"	short story	Alfred Hitchcock's Mystery Magazine (December 2002)	The Museum of Dr. Moses (2007)	

=== 2003 ===
Title	Type	Originally published in	Collected in	Notes
"Lorelei"	short story	The Dark: New Ghost Stories (2003)	High Crime Area: Tales of Darkness and Dread (2014)	Original title "Subway"; collected revised; anthologized in Unloaded: Crime Writers Writing Without Guns (2016)
"The Gravedigger's Daughter"	short story	Dream Me Home Safely: Writers on Growing Up in America (2003)	Uncollected	Excerpt from The Gravedigger's Daughter (2007); different excerpt than in Conjunctions and Witness
"Capricorn"	short story	Small Avalanches and Other Stories (2003)	Small Avalanches and Other Stories (2003)	
"The Visit"	short story	Small Avalanches and Other Stories (2003)	Small Avalanches and Other Stories (2003)	
"The Gathering Squall"	short story	Timothy McSweeney's Quarterly Concern (2003)	High Lonesome: New & Selected Stories (2006)	
"The Fish Factory"	short story	Storie (2003)	High Lonesome: New & Selected Stories (2006)	Reprinted in Salmagundi (Fall 2004–Winter 2005)
"Mistrial"	short story	Storie (2003)	Dear Husband (2009)	
"Fire"	short story	TriQuarterly (Spring 2003)	I Am No One You Know: Stories (2004)	
"Dr. Magic"	play	Conjunctions (Spring 2003)	Uncollected	
"Doll: A Romance of the Mississippi"	short story	The Gettysburg Review (Spring 2003)	The Female of the Species: Tales of Mystery and Suspense (2005)	Anthologized in The Best American Mystery Stories 2004 (2004)
"Marilyn Monroe? Meet Norma Jeane's Past"	short story	GQ (March 2003)	Uncollected	Excerpt from Blonde (2000)
"The Haunting"	short story	Fantasy & Science Fiction (April 2003)	The Female of the Species: Tales of Mystery and Suspense (2005)	Anthologized in The Mammoth Book of Best New Horror 15 (2004)
"The Gravedigger's Daughter"	short story	Witness (Summer/Fall 2003)	Uncollected	Excerpt from The Gravedigger's Daughter (2007); different excerpt than in Dream Me Home Safely and Conjunctions
"From The Gravedigger's Daughter"	short story	Conjunctions (Fall 2003)	Uncollected	Excerpt from The Gravedigger's Daughter (2007); different excerpt than in Dream Me Home Safely and Witness
"Mrs. Halifax and Rickie Swann: A Ballad"	short story	Boulevard (Fall 2003)	I Am No One You Know: Stories (2004)	
"The Hunter"	short story	Ellery Queen's Mystery Magazine (November 2003)	The Museum of Dr. Moses (2007)	

=== 2004 ===
Title	Type	Originally published in	Collected in	Notes
"— : Six Hypotheses"	short story	Flights: Extreme Visions of Fantasy (2004)	Uncollected	
"Poe Posthumous; or, The Light-House"	short story	McSweeney's Enchanted Chamber of Astonishing Stories (2004)	Wild Nights! (2008)	Original title "The Fabled Light-House of Viña del Mar"
"Objects in Mirror Are Closer Than They Appear"	short story	Boulevard (Spring 2004)	High Lonesome: New & Selected Stories (2006)	
"Fat Man My Love"	short story	Conjunctions (Spring 2004)	High Lonesome: New & Selected Stories (2006)	
"In Hot May"	short story	The Georgia Review (Spring 2004)	High Lonesome: New & Selected Stories (2006)	
"Stripping"	short story	Postscripts (Spring 2004)	The Museum of Dr. Moses (2007)	Anthologized in The Year's Best Fantasy and Horror: Eighteenth Annual Collection (2005)
"Panic"	short story	Michigan Quarterly Review (Summer 2004)	Dear Husband (2009)	Anthologized in Detroit Noir (2007)
"The Banshee"	short story	Ellery Queen's Mystery Magazine (June 2004)	The Female of the Species: Tales of Mystery and Suspense (2005)	
"The Cousins"	short story	Harper's Magazine (July 2004)	High Lonesome: New & Selected Stories (2006)	Excerpt from The Gravedigger's Daughter (2007); anthologized in The Best American Short Stories 2005 (2005)
"Spider Boy"	short story	The New Yorker (September 20, 2004)	High Lonesome: New & Selected Stories (2006)	
"Between Us There's a Secret"	short story	Narrative Magazine (Fall 2004)	Uncollected	Published online; excerpt from The Falls (2004)
"Little Maggie: A Mystery"	short story	Boulevard (Fall 2004)	Uncollected	Anthologized in The Rose & the Briar: Death, Love and Liberty in the American Ballad (2005)

=== 2005 ===
Title	Type	Originally published in	Collected in	Notes
"The Corn Maiden"	novella	Transgressions: Ten Brand-New Novellas (2005)	The Corn Maiden and Other Nightmares (2011)	Original title "The Corn Maiden: A Love Story"
"Give Me Your Heart"	short story	Dangerous Women (2005)	Give Me Your Heart: Tales of Mystery and Suspense (2010)	
"*BD* 11 1 87"	short story	The Atlantic Fiction Issue (2005)	High Lonesome: New & Selected Stories (2006)	
"The Stolen Heart"	short story	Harvard Review (2005)	Uncollected	Excerpt from The Stolen Heart (2005)
"From The Gravedigger's Daughter"	short story	Conjunctions (Spring 2005)	Uncollected	Excerpt from The Gravedigger's Daughter (2007)
"The Lost Brother"	short story	Zoetrope: All-Story (Spring 2005)	High Lonesome: New & Selected Stories (2006)	
"Surprise Surpirse!"	short story	The Kenyon Review (Summer 2005)	Uncollected	
"Bitch"	short story	Boulevard (Fall 2005)	Sourland: Stories (2010)	
"Whistle"	short story	Boulevard (Fall 2005)	Uncollected	
"Smother"	short story	Virginia Quarterly Review (Fall 2005)	Give Me Your Heart: Tales of Mystery and Suspense (2010)	
"So Help Me God"	short story	Virginia Quarterly Review (Winter 2005)	The Female of the Species: Tales of Mystery and Suspense (2005)	Anthologized in The Best American Mystery Stories 2006 (2006)
"High Lonesome"	short story	Zoetrope: All-Story (Winter 2005)	High Lonesome: New & Selected Stories (2006)	
"Bad Habits"	short story	Timothy McSweeney's Quarterly Concern (Winter 2005/2006)	The Museum of Dr. Moses (2007)	
"Honor Code"	short story	Ellery Queen's Mystery Magazine (December 2005)	Sourland: Stories (2010)	Anthologized in Wolf Woman Bay: And 9 More of the Finest Crime and Mystery Novellas of the Year (2007)

=== 2006 ===
Title	Type	Originally published in	Collected in	Notes
"Meadowlands"	short story	Murder at the Racetrack (2006)	Uncollected	Anthologized in The Best American Mystery Stories 2007 (2007)
"Suicide Watch"	short story	Playboy (May 2006)	The Museum of Dr. Moses (2007)	
"Babysitter"	short story	Ellery Queen's Mystery Magazine (June 2006)	Sourland: Stories (2010)	Excerpt from Babysitter (2022); anthologized in Horror: The Best of the Year, 2007 Edition (2007)
"Valentine, July Heat Wave"	short story	Harper's Bazaar UK (July 2006)	The Museum of Dr. Moses (2007)	Reprinted in Ellery Queen's Mystery Magazine (March/April 2007); anthologized in The Year's Best Fantasy and Horror: Twenty-First Annual Collection (2008)
"Bounty Hunter"	short story	The Guardian (July 15, 2006)	Sourland: Stories (2010)	
"Death Certificate"	short story	Boulevard (Fall 2006)	Sourland: Stories (2010)	
"Nowhere"	short story	Conjunctions (Fall 2006)	Give Me Your Heart: Tales of Mystery and Suspense (2010)	Anthologized in Pushcart Prize XXXII: Best of the Small Presses (2008)
"Grandpa Clemens & Angelfish, 1906"	short story	Timothy McSweeney's Quarterly Concern (Fall 2006)	Wild Nights! (2008)	
"EDickinsonRepliLuxe"	short story	Virginia Quarterly Review Supplement: Writers on Writers (Fall 2006)	Wild Nights! (2008)	
"A Princeton Idyll"	short story	The Yale Review (October 2006)	Dear Husband (2009)	
"Landfill"	short story	The New Yorker (October 9, 2006)	Dear Husband (2009)	Anthologized in The Year's Best Fantasy and Horror: Twentieth Annual Collection (2007) and The Ecco Anthology of Contemporary American Short Fiction (2008)

=== 2007 ===
Title	Type	Originally published in	Collected in	Notes
"Face"	short story	Inferno: New Tales of Terror and the Supernatural (2007)	Uncollected	
"The Blind Man's Sighted Daughters"	short story	Fiction (2007)	Dear Husband (2009)	Anthologized in The Best American Mystery Stories 2008 (2008)
"Strip Poker"	short story	Dead Man's Hand: Crime Fiction at the Poker Table (2007)	Give Me Your Heart: Tales of Mystery and Suspense (2010)	
"Apoca ca lyp se: A Dip tych"	short story	Dark Horizons (Spring 2007)	Uncollected	Anthologized in The Apocalypse Reader (2007)
"Donor Organs"	short story	Michigan Quarterly Review (Spring 2007)	Sourland: Stories (2010)	
"Hi! Howya Doin!"	short story	Ploughshares (Spring 2007)	The Museum of Dr. Moses (2007)	Original title "Hi Howya Doin"
"The Master at St. Bartholomew's Hospital, 1914–1916"	short story	Conjunctions (Spring 2007)	Wild Nights! (2008)	
"Papa at Ketchum, 1961"	short story	Salmagundi (Summer/Fall 2007)	Wild Nights! (2008)	Anthologized in Afflict the Comfortable (2015)
"Special"	short story	Boulevard (Fall 2007)	Dear Husband (2009)	
"Magda Maria"	short story	Timothy McSweeney's Quarterly Concern (Fall/Winter 2007)	Dear Husband (2009)	
"Tetanus"	short story	TriQuarterly (Winter 2007)	Give Me Your Heart: Tales of Mystery and Suspense (2010)	

=== 2008 ===
Title	Type	Originally published in	Collected in	Notes
"The First Husband"	short story	Ellery Queen's Mystery Magazine (January 2008)	Give Me Your Heart: Tales of Mystery and Suspense (2010)	
"The Beating"	short story	Conjunctions (Spring 2008)	Sourland: Stories (2010)	
"Dear Joyce Carol"	short story	Boulevard (Spring 2008)	Dear Husband (2009)	
"Bleeed"	short story	Shenandoah (Spring–Summer 2008)	Give Me Your Heart: Tales of Mystery and Suspense (2010)	
"Suicide by Fitness Center"	short story	Harper's Magazine (June 2008)	Dear Husband (2009)	
"Split/Brain"	short story	Ellery Queen's Mystery Magazine (September/October 2008)	Give Me Your Heart: Tales of Mystery and Suspense (2010)	
"Dear Husband"	short story	Conjunctions (Fall 2008)	Dear Husband (2009)	Anthologized in The Best American Mystery Stories 2009 (2009)
"Vigilante"	short story	Boulevard (Fall 2008)	Dear Husband (2009)	
"The Glazers"	short story	American Short Fiction (Winter/Spring 2008)	Dear Husband (2009)	

=== 2009 ===
Title	Type	Originally published in	Collected in	Notes
"Tiger Kitty"	short story	Half-Minute Horrors (2009)	Uncollected	
"Pumpkin-Head"	short story	The New Yorker (January 12, 2009)	Sourland: Stories (2010)	
"The Heart Sutra"	short story	American Short Fiction (Spring 2009)	Dear Husband (2009)	Reprinted online in The International Literary Quarterly (May 2009)
"Uranus"	short story	Conjunctions (Spring 2009)	Sourland: Stories (2010)	
"Cutty Sark"	short story	Salmagundi (Spring/Summer 2009)	Dear Husband (2009)	
"Sourland"	short story	Boulevard (Fall 2009)	Sourland: Stories (2010)	
"The Spill"	short story	The Kenyon Review (Winter 2009)	Give Me Your Heart: Tales of Mystery and Suspense (2010)	
"Bonobo Momma"	short story	Michigan Quarterly Review (Winter 2009)	Sourland: Stories (2010)	Anthologized in Pushcart Prize XXXIV: Best of the Small Presses (2010)

== 2010s ==
=== 2010 ===
Title	Type	Originally published in	Collected in	Notes
"Vena Cava"	short story	Give Me Your Heart: Tales of Mystery and Suspense (2010)	Give Me Your Heart: Tales of Mystery and Suspense (2010)	Anthologized in Portents (2011)
"Lost Daddy"	short story	Sourland: Stories (2010)	Sourland: Stories (2010)	
"The Story of the Stabbing"	short story	The Dark End of the Street: New Stories of Sex and Crime by Today's Top Authors (2010)	Sourland: Stories (2010)	
"Spotted Hyenas: A Romance"	short story	The Atlantic Fiction for Kindle (2010)	Black Dahlia & White Rose (2012)	Originally published online as Amazon Kindle exclusive; anthologized in Choose Wisely: 35 Women Up To No Good (2015)
"Fossil-Figures"	short story	Stories: All-New Tales (2010)	The Corn Maiden and Other Nightmares (2011)	
"The Nordic Soul"	short story	Conjunctions (Spring 2010)	Uncollected	Excerpt from The Crosswicks Horror, published as The Accursed (2013); revised version of excerpt (1984)
"Distance"	short story	Ploughshares (Spring 2010)	Lovely, Dark, Deep: Stories (2014)	
"Amputee"	short story	Shenandoah (Spring–Fall 2010)	Sourland: Stories (2010)	
"I.D."	short story	The New Yorker (March 29, 2010)	Black Dahlia & White Rose (2012)	Anthologized in The Best American Short Stories 2011 (2011)
"Beersheba"	short story	Ellery Queen's Mystery Magazine (September/October 2010)	The Corn Maiden and Other Nightmares (2011)	
"A Hole in the Head"	short story	The Kenyon Review (Fall 2010)	The Corn Maiden and Other Nightmares (2011)	Anthologized in The Best American Nonrequired Reading 2011 (2011)
"Mudgirl in the Land of Moriah"	short story	Boulevard (Fall 2010)	Uncollected	Excerpt from Mudwoman (2012)
"Roma!"	short story	Conjunctions (Fall 2010)	Black Dahlia & White Rose (2012)	
"Probate"	short story	Salmagundi (Fall 2010/Winter 2011)	Sourland: Stories (2010)	

=== 2011 ===
Title	Type	Originally published in	Collected in	Notes
"Widow's First Year"	short story	Hint Fiction: An Anthology of Stories in 25 Words or Fewer (2011)	Uncollected	
"Black Dahlia & White Rose"	short story	L.A. Noire: The Collected Stories (2011)	Black Dahlia & White Rose (2012)	
"Run Kiss Daddy"	short story	New Jersey Noir (2011)	Black Dahlia & White Rose (2012)	Anthologized in USA Noir: The Best of the Akashic Noir Series (2013)
"Mudwoman Bride"	short story	The Coffin Factory (2011)	Uncollected	Excerpt from Mudwoman (2012)
"Mudgirl Saved by the King of the Crows. April 1965."	short story	Boulevard (Spring 2011)	Uncollected	Excerpt from Mudwoman (2012); anthologized in Pushcart Prize XXXVII: Best of the Small Presses (2013)
"A Brutal Murder in a Public Place"	short story	Timothy McSweeney's Quarterly Concern (Spring 2011)	Black Dahlia & White Rose	Anthologized in Unconventional Fantasy: A Celebration of Forty Years of the World Fantasy Convention, Volume 4 (2014)
"Deceit"	short story	Conjunctions (Fall 2011)	Black Dahlia & White Rose	Anthologized in Protectors 2: Heroes (2015)
"Helping Hands"	short story	Boulevard (Fall 2011)	The Corn Maiden and Other Nightmares (2011)	
"San Quentin"	short story	Playboy (October 2011)	Black Dahlia & White Rose (2012)	
"The Good Samaritan"	short story	Harper's Magazine (December 2011)	Black Dahlia & White Rose (2012)	

=== 2012 ===
Title	Type	Originally published in	Collected in	Notes
"[Carthage]"	short story	Fighting Words (2012)	Uncollected	Excerpt from Carthage (2014)
"Patricide"	novella	Patricide (2012)	Lovely, Dark, Deep: Stories (2014)	Originally published as standalone ebook
"The Rescuer"	novella	The Rescuer (2012)	High Crime Area: Tales of Darkness and Dread (2014)	Originally published as standalone ebook
"Snake Frenzy"	short story	The Coffin Factory (2012)	Uncollected	Excerpt from The Accursed (2013)
"The Flatbed"	novella	Conjunctions (Spring 2012)	Evil Eye: Four Novellas of Love Gone Wrong (2013)	
"So Near, Anytime Always"	novella	Ellery Queen's Mystery Magazine (March/April 2012)	Evil Eye: Four Novellas of Love Gone Wrong (2013)	Anthologized in The Best American Mystery Stories 2013 (2013)
"Hey Dad"	short story	Ellery Queen's Mystery Magazine (August 2012)	Black Dahlia & White Rose (2012)	
"Anniversary"	short story	Boulevard (Fall 2012)	Black Dahlia & White Rose (2012)	
"A Book of Martyrs"	short story	Virginia Quarterly Review (Fall 2012)	Lovely, Dark, Deep: Stories (2014)	

=== 2013 ===
Title	Type	Originally published in	Collected in	Notes
"A Game of Draughts"	short story	Exotic Gothic 5, Volume I (2013)	Uncollected	Excerpt from The Accursed (2013)
"High"	short story	The Marijuana Chronicles (2013)	High Crime Area: Tales of Darkness and Dread (2014)	
"The Execution"	novella	Fiction (2013)	Evil Eye: Four Novellas of Love Gone Wrong (2013)	
"'Stephanos is Dead'"	short story	The Yale Review (January 2013)	Lovely, Dark, Deep: Stories (2014)	
"Evil Eye"	novella	Boulevard (Spring 2013)	Evil Eye: Four Novellas of Love Gone Wrong (2013)	
"Betrayal"	short story	Conjunctions (Spring 2013)	Lovely, Dark, Deep: Stories (2014)	
"Sex with Camel"	short story	The American Reader (May/June 2013)	Lovely, Dark, Deep: Stories (2014)	
"The Jesters"	short story	Virginia Quarterly Review (Summer 2013)	Lovely, Dark, Deep: Stories (2014)	Anthologized in The Uncanny Reader: Stories from the Shadows (2015)
"Forked River Roadside Shrine, South Jersey"	short story	Vice (June 10, 2013)	Lovely, Dark, Deep: Stories (2014)	
"Mastiff"	short story	The New Yorker (July 1, 2013)	Lovely, Dark, Deep: Stories (2014)	Anthologized in The Best American Short Stories 2014 (2014) and Simpsonistas: Tales from the Simpson Literary Project Vol. 3 (2021)
"The Disappearing"	short story	American Short Fiction (Fall 2013)	Lovely, Dark, Deep: Stories (2014)	
"Toad-Baby"	short story	Boulevard (Fall 2013)	High Crime Area: Tales of Darkness and Dread (2014)	
"Lovely, Dark, Deep"	short story	Harper's Magazine (November 2013)	Lovely, Dark, Deep: Stories (2014)	

=== 2014 ===
Title	Type	Originally published in	Collected in	Notes
"Angel of Wrath"	short story	Tweed's Magazine (2014)	Uncollected	Excerpt from The Sacrifice (2015)
"High Crime Area"	short story	Boulevard (Spring 2014)	High Crime Area: Tales of Darkness and Dread (2014)	
"The Home at Craigmillnar"	short story	The Kenyon Review (Spring 2014)	High Crime Area: Tales of Darkness and Dread (2014)	Anthologized in The Best American Mystery Stories 2015 (2015)
"The Hunter"	short story	Boulevard (Fall 2014)	Lovely, Dark, Deep: Stories (2014)	
"Things Passed on the Way to Oblivion"	short story	Salmagundi (Fall 2014)	Lovely, Dark, Deep: Stories (2014)	
"The Memorial Field at Hazard, Minnesota"	short story	The Yale Review (October 2014)	Beautiful Days: Stories (2018)	
"Descending and Ascending"	short story	Narrative Magazine (Winter 2014)	Uncollected	Published online; excerpt from Carthage (2014)
"Equatorial"	short story	Ellery Queen's Mystery Magazine (December 2014)	The Doll-Master and Other Tales of Terror (2016)	

=== 2015 ===
Title	Type	Originally published in	Collected in	Notes
"The Doll-Master"	short story	The Doll Collection (2015)	The Doll-Master and Other Tales of Terror (2016)	
"Mystery, Inc."	short story	Mystery, Inc. (2015)	The Doll-Master and Other Tales of Terror (2016)	Originally published as standalone ebook; anthologized in Bibliomysteries : Stories of Crime in the World of Books and Bookstores, Volume Two (2018)
"Soldier"	short story	The Idaho Review (2015)	The Doll-Master and Other Tales of Terror (2016)	
"Big Burnt"	short story	Conjunctions (Spring 2015)	Beautiful Days: Stories (2018)	
"The Bereaved"	short story	The Yale Review (July 2015)	Beautiful Days: Stories (2018)	
"Gun Accident"	short story	Ellery Queen's Mystery Magazine (July 2015)	The Doll-Master and Other Tales of Terror (2016)	Original title "Gun Accident: An Investigation"; anthologized in Year's Best Crime and Mystery Stories 2016 (2016)
"The Nice Girl"	short story	Boulevard (Fall 2015)	Flint Kill Creek: Stories of Mystery and Suspense (2024)	
"Walking Wounded"	short story	Conjunctions (Fall 2015)	Night-Gaunts (2018)	
"Flueve Bleu"	short story	The Kenyon Review (September/October 2015)	Beautiful Days: Stories (2018)	

=== 2016 ===
Title	Type	Originally published in	Collected in	Notes
"Heartbreak"	short story	Taking Aim: Power and Pain, Teens and Guns (2016)	DIS MEM BER and Other Stories of Mystery and Suspense (2017)	
"The Drowned Girl"	short story	Boulevard (Spring 2016)	DIS MEM BER and Other Stories of Mystery and Suspense (2017)	
"Friend of My Heart"	short story	Conjunctions (Spring 2016)	Flint Kill Creek: Stories of Mystery and Suspense (2024)	
"Big Momma"	short story	Ellery Queen's Mystery Magazine (March/April 2016)	The Doll-Master and Other Tales of Terror (2016)	
"The Situations"	short story	Vice (May 2016)	DIS MEM BER and Other Stories of Mystery and Suspense (2017)	Anthologized in Dark Screams: Volume Six (2017)
"The Woman in the Window"	short story	One Story (June 9, 2016)	Night-Gaunts (2018)	Anthologized in In Sunlight or in Shadow (2016) and The Best American Mystery Stories 2017 (2017)
"Owl Eyes"	short story	The Yale Review (July 2016)	Beautiful Days: Stories (2018)	
"Donald Barthelme Saved from Oblivion"	short story	American Short Fiction (Fall 2016)	Beautiful Days: Stories (2018)	
"DIS MEM BER"	short story	Boulevard (Fall 2016)	DIS MEM BER and Other Stories of Mystery and Suspense (2017)	
"Undocumented Alien"	short story	Conjunctions (Fall 2016)	Beautiful Days: Stories (2018)	Original title "Undocumented Alien: Very Rough First Draft Report PROJECT JRD"; anthologized in Pushcart Prize XLII: Best of the Small Presses (2018)
"1941: Lockport, NY"	short story	Lapham's Quarterly (Fall 2016)	Uncollected	Excerpt from Wonderland (1971)
"The Crawl Space"	short story	Ellery Queen's Mystery Magazine (September/October 2016)	DIS MEM BER and Other Stories of Mystery and Suspense (2017)	
"The Quiet Car"	short story	Harper's Magazine (October 2016)	Beautiful Days: Stories (2018)	
"The Man Without a Shadow"	short story	Narrative Magazine (Winter 2016)	Uncollected	Published online; excerpt from The Man Without a Shadow (2016)

=== 2017 ===
Title	Type	Originally published in	Collected in	Notes
"Les Beaux Jours"	short story	Alive in Shape and Color: 16 Paintings by Great Artists and the Stories They Inspired (2017)	Beautiful Days: Stories (2018)	
"Great Blue Heron"	short story	Black Feathers: Dark Avian Tales (2017)	DIS MEM BER and Other Stories of Mystery and Suspense (2017)	
"The Translator"	short story	Crossing Borders: Stories and Essays About Translation (2017)	Uncollected	
"The Happy Place"	short story	Speaking of Work: A Story of Love, Suspense and Paperclips (2017)	The (Other) You (2021)	Anthologized in Concord Free Press Presents: A Decade of Reading and Giving (2019) and Simpsonistas: Tales from New Literary Project Vol. 4 (2022)
"Leander"	short story	Tales of Two Americas: Stories of Inequality in a Divided Nation (2017)	Uncollected	
"Welcome to Friendly Skies!"	short story	The Idaho Review (2017)	DIS MEM BER and Other Stories of Mystery and Suspense (2017)	
"Fractal"	short story	Conjunctions (Spring 2017)	Beautiful Days: Stories (2018)	
"The Experimental Subject"	short story	Conjunctions Online (June 13–20, 2017)	Night-Gaunts (2018)	Originally published online
"The Abortion Provider: 1987"	short story	Boulevard (Fall 2017)	Uncollected	Excerpt from A Book of American Martyrs (2017)
"Phantomwise: 1972"	novella	Ellery Queen's Mystery Magazine (September/October 2017)	Cardiff, by the Sea (2020)	
"The Long-Legged Girl"	short story	The Kenyon Review (September/October 2017)	Night-Gaunts (2018)	
"Night-Gaunts"	short story	The Yale Review (October 2017)	Night-Gaunts (2018)	
"The Sign of the Beast"	short story	The Sign of the Beast (November 28, 2017)	Night-Gaunts (2018)	Originally published as Kindle single
"Mud Time"	short story	Narrative Magazine (Winter 2017)	Uncollected	Published online; excerpt from A Book of American Martyrs (2017)
"Intimacy"	short story	Vice (December 2017)	Night, Neon (2021)	

=== 2018 ===
Title	Type	Originally published in	Collected in	Notes
"Miao Dao"	novella	Dark Corners (2018)	Cardiff, by the Sea (2020)	Originally published online as Amazon Kindle exclusive
"Surviving Child"	novella	Echoes: The Saga Anthology of Ghost Stories (2018)	Cardiff, by the Sea (2020)	
"'Good News!'"	short story	It Occurs to Me That I Am America (2018)	Uncollected	Excerpt from Hazards of Time Travel (2018)
"Hazards of Time Travel"	short story	Simpsonistas: Tales from the Simpson Family Literary Project Vol. 1 (2018)	Uncollected	Excerpt from Hazards of Time Travel (2018)
"The Archivist"	short story	Boulevard (Spring 2018)	Uncollected	Excerpt from My Life as a Rat (2019); anthologized in The Best American Mystery Stories 2019 (2019)
"Cherie and the Stranger-Kitty"	short story	Kazoo (Spring 2018)	Uncollected	
"Night, Neon"	short story	American Short Fiction (Summer 2018)	Night, Neon (2021)	
"The Crack"	short story	Salmagundi (Summer 2018)	The (Other) You (2021)	
"Where Are You?"	short story	The New Yorker: Flash Fiction (July 5, 2018)	The (Other) You (2021)	Originally published online
"The Bloody Head"	short story	The Idaho Review (Summer/Fall 2018)	The (Other) You (2021)	
"Waiting for Kizer"	short story	Conjunctions (Fall 2018)	The (Other) You (2021)	
"Wanting"	short story	Narrative Magazine (Winter 2018)	Night, Neon (2021)	Originally published online; anthologized in Uncertainties: Volume III (2018)

=== 2019 ===
Title	Type	Originally published in	Collected in	Notes
"The Flagellant"	short story	At Home in the Dark (2019)	Night, Neon (2021)	
"Assassin"	short story	Cutting Edge: New Stories of Mystery and Crime by Women Writers (2019)	The (Other) You (2021)	
"Blue Guide"	short story	Boulevard (Spring 2019)	The (Other) You (2021)	
"Nightgrief"	short story	Conjunctions (Spring 2019)	The (Other) You (2021)	
"Damned Little Dog"	short story	Exile (Spring 2019)	Uncollected	
"The Sorrowful Virgin"	short story	F(r)iction (Spring 2019)	Uncollected	Excerpt from My Life as a Rat (2019)
"The Rescue"	short story	Narrative Magazine (Spring 2019)	Uncollected	Published online; excerpt from My Life as a Rat (2019)
"The Women Friends"	short story	Ellery Queen's Mystery Magazine (March/April 2019)	The (Other) You (2021)	
"The Unexpected"	short story	Harper's Magazine (May 2019)	The (Other) You (2021)	
"Mr. Stickum"	short story	Playboy (Summer 2019)	The Ruins of Contracoeur and Other Presences (2021)	Included in Zero-Sum: Stories (2023)
"The Cold"	short story	Virginia Quarterly Review (Summer 2019)	The Ruins of Contracoeur and Other Presences (2021)	Included in Zero-Sum: Stories (2023)
"Final Interview"	short story	The Strand Magazine (July–November 2019)	The (Other) You (2021)	
"A Theory Pre-Post-Mortem"	short story	Conjunctions (Fall 2019)	Zero-Sum: Stories (2023)	
"Sinners in the Hands of an Angry God"	short story	The New Yorker (October 14, 2019)	The (Other) You (2021)	
"The (Other) You"	short story	Lincoln Center Theater Review (Winter 2019)	The (Other) You (2021)	Original title "You"

== 2020s ==
=== 2020 ===
Title	Type	Originally published in	Collected in	Notes
"From A Book of American Martyrs"	short story	Choice Words: Writers On Abortion (2020)	Uncollected	Excerpt from A Book of American Martyrs (2017)
"Vaping: A User's Manual"	short story	Nicotine Chronicles (2020)	Night, Neon (2021)	
"Parole Hearing, California Institution for Women, Chino, CA"	short story	Boulevard (Spring 2020)	Night, Neon (2021)	Anthologized in The Best Mystery Stories of the Year 2021 (2021) and Pushcart Prize XLVI: Best of the Small Presses (2022)
"Monstersister"	short story	Conjunctions (Spring 2020)	The Ruins of Contracoeur and Other Presences (2021)	Included in Zero-Sum: Stories (2023)
"Cardiff, by the Sea"	novella	Ellery Queen's Mystery Magazine (March/April 2020)	Cardiff, by the Sea (2020)	
"M A R T H E: A Referendum"	short story	Elle (April 2020)	Zero-Sum: Stories (2023)	Original title "MARTHE"; anthologized in Simpsonistas: Tales from New Literary Project Vol. 5 (2023)
"Still Life"	short story	Harper's Magazine (June 2020)	Uncollected	Excerpt from Night. Sleep. Death. The Stars. (2020)
"Hospice/Honeymoon"	short story	The New Yorker (July 30, 2020)	The (Other) You (2021)	
"The Appointment"	short story	Weird Fiction Review (Fall 2020)	Uncollected	Revised as "***" (2023)
"The Redwoods"	short story	American Short Fiction (Winter 2020)	The Ruins of Contracoeur and Other Presences (2021)	Included in The Frenzy (2026)

=== 2021 ===
Title	Type	Originally published in	Collected in	Notes
"Miss Golden Dreams 1949"	short story	Collectibles (2021)	Night, Neon (2021)	Revised version of play (2001)
"Take Me, I Am Free"	short story	When Things Get Dark: Stories Inspired by Shirley Jackson (2021)	Zero-Sum: Stories (2023)	
"Rio Piedra"	short story	Conjunctions (Spring 2021)	Uncollected	
"'Curious'"	short story	Salmagundi (Spring–Summer 2021)	Night, Neon (2021)	
"Detour"	short story	Harper's Magazine (March 2021)	Night, Neon (2021)	Anthologized in The Best Mystery Stories of the Year 2022 (2022)
"Subaqueous"	short story	The Yale Review (Summer 2021)	The (Other) You (2021)	
"Bone Marrow Donor"	short story	Ellery Queen's Mystery Magazine (July/August 2021)	Flint Kill Creek: Stories of Mystery and Suspense (2024)	
"The Suicide"	short story	Boulevard (Fall 2021)	Zero-Sum: Stories (2023)	
"Zero-Sum"	short story	Conjunctions (Fall 2021)	Zero-Sum: Stories (2023)	
"Babysitter"	short story	INQUE (November 2021)	Uncollected	Excerpt from Babysitter (2022)

=== 2022 ===
Title	Type	Originally published in	Collected in	Notes
"'The Father of Modern Gynecology': J. Marion Syms, M.D. (1813-1883)"	short story	Screams from the Dark: 29 Tales of Monsters and the Monstrous (2022)	Uncollected	Excerpt from Butcher: A Novel (2024)
"The Baby-Monitor"	short story	Conjunctions (Spring 2022)	Zero-Sum: Stories (2023)	
"33 Clues into the Disappearance of My Sister"	short story	Ellery Queen's Mystery Magazine (March/April 2022)	Uncollected	Excerpt from 48 Clues into the Disappearance of My Sister (2023); anthologized in The Best American Mystery and Suspense 2023 (2023)
"Sparrow"	short story	American Short Fiction (Winter 2022–23)	Zero-Sum: Stories (2023)	

=== 2023 ===
Title	Type	Originally published in	Collected in	Notes
"The Chair of Tranquility (from the Diary of Mrs. Thomas Peele, Trenton, New Jersey, 1853)"	short story	A Darker Shade of Noir: New Stories of Body Horror by Women Writers (2023)	Uncollected	Excerpt from Butcher: A Novel (2024)
"Lovesick"	short story	Fiction (2023)	Zero-Sum: Stories (2023)	
"Mick & Minn"	short story	Boulevard (Spring 2023)	Flint Kill Creek: Stories of Mystery and Suspense (2024)	Anthologized in Pushcart Prize XLIX: Best of the Small Presses (2025)
"Flint Kill Creek"	short story	Conjunctions (Spring 2023)	Flint Kill Creek: Stories of Mystery and Suspense (2024)	
"The Phlebotomist"	short story	Ellery Queen's Mystery Magazine (March/April 2023)	Flint Kill Creek: Stories of Mystery and Suspense (2024)	
"The Bicycle Accident"	short story	The New Yorker (April 27, 2023)	The Frenzy (2026)	
"Small Veins"	short story	Fictionable (Summer 2023)	The Frenzy (2026)	Originally published online
"This Is Not a Drill"	short story	INQUE (July 2023)	Zero-Sum: Stories (2023)	
"The Return"	short story	Harper's Magazine (August 2023)	The Frenzy (2026)	
"The Siren: 1999"	short story	Ellery Queen's Mystery Magazine (September/October 2023)	Flint Kill Creek: Stories of Mystery and Suspense (2024)	
"The Fear"	short story	Michigan Quarterly Review (Winter 2023)	The Frenzy (2026)	Original title "Cousins"
"***"	short story	Ellery Queen's Mystery Magazine (November/December 2023)	Flint Kill Creek: Stories of Mystery and Suspense (2024)	Revised version of "The Appointment" (2020)
"Happy Christmas: A Short Story"	short story	Joyce Carol Oates: A Writer's Journal (December 12, 2023)	Flint Kill Creek: Stories of Mystery and Suspense (2024)	Originally published online; expanded version of "Happy" (1984)

=== 2024 ===
Title	Type	Originally published in	Collected in	Notes
"The Apprentice"	short story	Conjunctions (Spring 2024)	Uncollected	Excerpt from Butcher: A Novel (2024)
"Weekday"	short story	Salmagundi (Spring–Summer 2024)	Flint Kill Creek: Stories of Mystery and Suspense (2024)	
"Late Love"	short story	The New Yorker (April 22–29, 2024)	Flint Kill Creek: Stories of Mystery and Suspense (2024)	
"The Massacre at Mount Pitcairn"	short story	Conjunctions (Fall 2024)	Uncollected	
"The Heiress. The Hireling"	short story	Ellery Queen's Mystery Magazine (September/October 2024)	Flint Kill Creek: Stories of Mystery and Suspense (2024)	
"Butcher: Father of Modern Gyno-Psychiatry"	short story	Boulevard (Winter 2024)	Uncollected	Excerpt from Butcher: A Novel (2024)

=== 2025 ===
Title	Type	Originally published in	Collected in	Notes
"The Portal"	short story	Conjunctions (Spring 2025)	Uncollected	
"Refuge"	short story	Zyzzyva (Spring 2025)	The Frenzy (2026)	
"The Frenzy"	short story	The New Yorker (March 24, 2025)	The Frenzy (2026)	
"An Excerpt from My New Novel 'Fox': The Raptor's Eye"	short story	Joyce Carol Oates: A Writer's Journal (May 15, 2025)	Uncollected	Published online; excerpt from Fox (2025)
"In Fox, Joyce Carol Oates Takes on a Classic Whodunit with a 'Charming Con Man' – Read an Excerpt! (Exclusive)"	short story	People (June 17, 2025)	Uncollected	Published online; excerpt from Fox (2025)
"Fox: Another Excerpt from My New Novel"	short story	Joyce Carol Oates: A Writer's Journal (June 26, 2025)	Uncollected	Published online; excerpt from Fox (2025)

=== 2026 ===
Title	Type	Originally published in	Collected in	Notes
"A (Confidential) Portrait of the Fields Medalist as a Young Boy"	short story	Axe: Stories That Cut Deep (2026)	Uncollected	Excerpt from My Lost One (TBA)
"Strangle"	short story	Conjunctions (Spring 2026)	Uncollected	
"Night Fishing at Antibes"	short story	Telluride Magazine (Summer/Fall 2026)	The Frenzy (2026)	
"Lost Child"	short story	The New Yorker (September 21, 2026)	Uncollected	
