= Man Crazy (disambiguation) =

Man Crazy is a 1997 novel by Joyce Carol Oates.

Man Crazy may also refer to:

- Man Crazy (1953 film), directed by Irving Lerner
- Man Crazy (1927 film), an American comedy film directed by John Francis Dillon

== See also ==
- "Crazy Man, Crazy", 1953 song by Bill Haley & His Comets
- The Crazy Man, 2005 Canadian children's novel by Pamela Porter
