= The Assignation (short story collection) =

1988 short story collection by Joyce Carol Oates

- First edition
- Author: Joyce Carol Oates
- Language: English
- Publisher: Ecco Press
- Publication date: 1988
- Publication place: United States
- Media type: Print (hardback)
- ISBN: 978-0-88001-200-3

The Assignation is a collection of 44 works of short fiction by Joyce Carol Oates published by Ecco Press in 1988.

== Stories ==
- "One Flesh"
- "Slow"
- "The Boy"
- "Sharpshooting"
- "Tick"
- "Photographer's Model"
- "Accident"
- "Mule"
- "A Touch of the Flu"
- "Holiday"
- "Éleuthérie"
- "The Abduction"
- "In Traction"
- "Romance"
- "Only Son"
- "Bad Habits"
- "Anecdote"
- "The Quarrel"
- "Pinch"
- "Secret"
- "Ace"
- "Heartland"
- "Maximum Security"
- "The Assignation"
- "Fin de siècle"
- "The Bystander"
- "Shelter"
- "Party"
- "Stroke"
- "Adulteress"
- "Superstitious"
- "A Sentimental Encounter"
- "Señorita"
- "Face"
- "August Evening"
- "Picnic"
- "Visitation Rights"
- "Two Doors"
- "Desire"
- "Train"
- "The Others"
- "Blue-bearded Lover"
- "Secret Observations of the Goat-Girl"
- "The Stadium"

== Reception ==
Literary critic James Atlas in The New York Times reports that these stories—simply "narratives" according to Oates—possess "the peculiar virtues and defects of her distinctive voice."

Noting that few of the pieces exceed a "seven of eight pages," Atlas registers this critique: "Too many of these stories seem like exercises or false starts. Some are so fragmentary that it's hard to get your bearings; the story's over before it's begun."

Kirkus Reviews also points to the brevity of the stories - "no more than two of three pages" - which amount to mere "sketches" dealing almost exclusively with death and decay. The reviewer judges the collection "Vintage Oates—always interesting, though not always pleasant."

Publishers Weekly offered a mixed appraisal to the collection, observing that the fiction "offers brilliant bursts of energy that are both dazzling and disappointing for their ephemeral nature" but adding that the stories "reveal a master of the form writing at her efficient, full-tilt best." The reviewer also pointed out the shortest of these narrative "ranging in length from a simple paragraph of five sentences to a dozen pages at most..."

== Critical assessment ==
"In The Assignation, one of Oates's two collections of 'miniature narratives,' such tales as "Blue-Bearded Lover" and "The Others" recall nineteenth-century Gothic literature, while others convey the kind of hothouse psychological intensity, the precarious balance between sanity and madness, traditionally associated with the genre."

Johnson adds that "With their brief, truncated scenes and their poetic intensity, they have a brutal, sometimes horrific impact, lying bare with deft economy and unflinching directness the anxieties, longings, and obsessions lying just beneath the surface of 'ordinary' life."

Though "sinister strangers," appear in a number of these works, literary critic Gretchen Elizabeth Schultz cautions "that many of the stories in The Assignation...involve figures thoroughly familiar to the protagonists, family members for instance. In "Heartland," a daughter visiting parents" whom she hasn't seen in a very long time" is left wondering if she has ever really seen them at all (and if they have ever really seen her." In "Bad Habits," it is a wife who has trouble recognizing the husband "who squinted up at her without seeming to recognize her." Schultz traces the stories in The Assignation to Oates's earliest literary efforts:

Readers of the rest of Oates's work will not be surprised that many of the characters in [this] collection lose the selves they may or may not find again...other selves as have haunted Oates's work and menaced the lives and psyches of her characters from the very start.

== Sources ==
- Atlas, James. 1988. "Dabbling in Love—Not the Nice Kind." The New York Times, October 2, 1988. https://www.nytimes.com/1988/10/02/books/dabbling-in-love-not-the-nice-kind.html Retrieved 19 November 2023
- Johnson, Greg. 1994. Joyce Carol Oates: A Study of the Short Fiction. Twayne's studies in short fiction; no. 57. Twayne Publishers, New York. ISBN 0-8057-0857-X
- Kirkus Reviews. 1988. Bookshelf: The Assignation. Kirkus Reviews, August 15, 1988 https://www.kirkusreviews.com/book-reviews/joyce-carol-oates/assignation/ Retrieved 18 November 2023
- Oates, Joyce Carol. 1988. The Assignation. Ecco Press, New York. p. 193 ISBN 978-0-88001-200-3
- Publishers Weekly. 1988. Assignation. Publishers Weekly, September, 1988. https://www.publishersweekly.com/9780880012003 Retrieved 19 November 2023.
