= Mudwoman =

2012 novel by Joyce Carol Oates

- First edition
- Author: Joyce Carol Oates
- Language: English
- Genre: Psychological Horror
- Published: March 13, 2012
- Publisher: Ecco

Mudwoman is 2012 horror novel by Joyce Carol Oates. The novel is a psychological horror and campus novel, which follows the experience of a university president, M.R. Neukirchen, "haunted by her secret past as the child of a poor, mentally ill religious fanatic who tried to drown her in a riverside mudflat".

== Development and context ==
Oates says that the novel started as a "dream vision" describing it as "I saw a woman sitting at a large table wearing inappropriate, very heavy makeup that had dried, like mud, and was darker than her skin." Oates wrote the novel in response to the dream, and during a period that was hard for Oates: her husband died while she was drafting the novel. Kevin Nance of the Washington Post describes these two influences as creating a deeply autobiographical novel.

== Themes and style ==
The novel reflects on themes of memory and mental health. Oates includes autobiographical elements like she does in other novels, using the fictional exploration of the "brutal world of her childhood" as a means of probing her fictional protagonist's psyche. The novel starts with a "psychotic mother abandoning her two small girls to die", and that scene follows M.R. Neukirchen throughout the novel. Emma Hagestadt of The Independent also describes Oates' approach to this often repeated plot device in fiction, as accented by " Oates's idiosyncratic eye for unsettling detail."

In the Inside Higher Ed interview of Oates, Serena Golden explores how the novel both reflects and diverges from the challenges faced by women academics in high profile universities.

Kevin Nance describes the novel as "oscillat[ing] between realism and the surreal" like much of her other works. Nance connects this stylistic approach to the work of James Joyce, where realistic "give[s] way to bizarre hallucinatory scenes."

== Reception ==
Reviews of the novel were mixed. The New Yorker's Katia Bachko called the work a "powerful novel". Washington Post reviewer Kevin Nance called the novel "one of her most personal, autobiographical and deeply felt novels." Reviewer Deirdre Danahue for USA Today, described the novel as "generat[ing] equal parts foaming annoyance and breathless admiration". Emma Hagestadt of The Independent described the novel "an intriguing and bold novel about the flip side of success, and the consequences of sexual and psychological violence on the female psyche" but notes that at times it becomes " dense with characters and ideas."
