= Marya: A Life =

Novel by Joyce Carol Oates

- First edition
- Author: Joyce Carol Oates
- Language: English
- Genre: novel
- Publisher: E. P. Dutton
- Publication date: 1986
- Publication place: United States
- Media type: Print (hardback)
- ISBN: 978-0525243748

Marya: A Life is a novel by Joyce Carol Oates first published in 1986 by E. P. Dutton and reprinted by Berkley Books. The work was reissued by Ecco Press in 2014.

== Reception ==
New York Times literary critic Mary Gordon, praising Marya: A Life as Oates's "strongest book in years," laments that the descriptive authority of the narrative declines with the rising fortunes of the protagonist. As Marya ascends from her impoverished condition into the upper echelons of academia, Oates "unerring" powers of description are diminished:

When Marya's life materially improves, the novel grows weaker...when Marya prospers, Miss Oates grows abstract. This is because its strength emanates from the brilliance of Miss Oates's descriptions of objects and places.

Gordon notes that the autobiographical elements in the novel comport with aspects of Oates's early family history and her subsequent literary career.

== Theme ==
"Marya: A Life is about a young woman who tries to achieve selfhood, not through balance but through suppressing one side of her being. Lurking in her subconscious and associated with sexuality, weakness, rage, and madness is a dark double, her lost mother. Marya's life is a progressive strengthening of brittle self-sufficiency, a rejection of the inner 'female' world of emotion for the outer 'male' world of success. Yet at the end of the novel the implication is certainly that Marya must come to terms with her femaleness and her matrilineal heritage." - Joanne V. Creighton in Joyce Carol Oates: Novels of the Middle Years (1979).

Based on the preface that Oates provided in the early editions to the novel, literary critic Josephene Kealey conjectures that Marya is "Oates's literary self." Kealey places great significance on the preface.

Oates wishes to tell us something about her book through her introduction to the story. She states: "Marya: A Life will very likely remain the most 'personal' of my novels . . . though it is not, in the strictest sense, autobiographical."

Kealey considers the Preface as a kind of Rosetta Stone, "a theoretical guide to how we are to read Marya. The lesson Oates wants us to learn from her Preface is one about the failure of knowledge."

== Sources ==
- Creighton, Joanne V. 1979. Joyce Carol Oates: Novels of the Middle Years. Twayne Publishers, New York. Warren G. French, editor. ISBN 978-0805776478
- Gordon, Mary. 1986. The Life and Hard Times of Cinderella. New York Times, March 2, 1986. https://www.nytimes.com/1986/03/02/books/the-life-and-hard-times-of-cinderella.html?pagewanted=all Accessed 31 January 2025.
- Kealey, Josephene T. M. 2015. "I know you!": The Implications of Knowing In Joyce Carol Oates's Marya: A Life," in Bearing Witness: Joyce Carol Oates Studies: Vol. 2, Article 5. https://repository.usfca.edu/cgi/viewcontent.cgi?article=1009&context=jcostudies Accessed 14 February 2025.
- Oates, Joyce Carol. 1986. Marya: A Life. E. P. Dutton, New York. ISBN 978-0525243748
