= Hazards of Time Travel =

2018 novel by Joyce Carol Oates

- Author: Joyce Carol Oates
- Language: English
- Genre: dystopian, social science fiction
- Publisher: Ecco Press
- Publication date: November 27, 2018
- Publication place: United States
- Pages: 336
- ISBN: 978-0-06-231959-3

Hazards of Time Travel is a 2018 dystopian, social science fiction novel by Joyce Carol Oates. It tells the story of Adriane Strohl, a 17-year-old living in a dystopian America in 2039. After her incendiary graduation speech, she is sent back to re-education in the year 1959. Oates began writing it in 2011.

== Reception ==
The Guardian described Hazards of Time Travel as an "unrelentingly disturbing read", praising Oates' ability to write convincingly about "the pervasive misery of living in fear", but also remarking that the book "appears skeletal, super-intelligent, yet somehow depleted. It seems to have been written in an abbreviated rush." The review in The New York Times notes "the novel’s underdescribed future, with its hints at totalitarian politics, doesn’t play to Oates’s strengths as a nostalgia artist." Kirkus Reviews called the novel "more shambling than dystopian classics by Orwell, Atwood, and Ishiguro but energized by a similar spirit of outrage."
