= Babysitter (Oates novel) =

2022 novel by Joyce Carol Oates

- First edition
- Author: Joyce Carol Oates
- Language: English
- Publisher: Alfred A. Knopf
- Publication date: 2022
- Publication place: United States
- Media type: Print (hardback)
- Pages: 448
- ISBN: 978-0802125057

Babysitter is a novel by Joyce Carol Oates published in 2022 by Alfred A. Knopf.

== Contents ==
Part I
- She Asks Herself Why
- Do Not Disturb
- I Am
- When We Died
- Only This Once
- The Calendar
- First Touch
- Fever
- Empty Ballroom
- Lost
- Sin
- Before Babysitter
- Conscience
- "Give Mommy a Kiss"
- Beautiful Clothes
- You Like This
- The Adored One

Part II

- When I Died
- Infection
- Waiting
- Breathe
- [Body of Missing...]
- "Children Not Loved & Not Deserved"
- Armed
- Happiness
- Sexual Rival(s)
- "Stupid C__t"
- Rehearsal
- Asks Herself: Why?
- Never Look Back to See Where a Smile Has Gone
- Predator, Prey
- Starboy
- Ponytail
- Broken
- Death Sentence

Part III

- Disguise
- No Tears!
- "Suspect"
- "No Help"
- Abduction
- Vigil
- The Tip
- Beautiful Boy
- Never Say No
- The Intruder
- Evidence
- Alive!

Part IV

- Mistletoe 1977
- "I Am So Sorry"
- Dry Heat, September
- Kiss Mommy
- The Lover: The Call
- The Lover: The Assignation
- Armor
- Pearls
- A Door Closes. a Door Opens.
- Fairy Tale
- Home Invasion
- A Loaded Gun
- "Suicide"
- Lone Lake
- The Stone
- The Lover. the Stalker.
- "Mikhail"
- The Emissary
- Delivery Boy
- Negative
- Zink Jewelers Estate & Loan
- "For Sale"
- "Bless Me, Father"
- Do Not Disturb"

== Reception ==
New York Times critic Oyinkan Braithwaite reports that reading Babysitter may be unsettling:

It spares nothing in its violent account of every kind of horror one could imagine happening in a single story: rape, pedophilia and child abuse, police brutality, more rape, murder.

Praising Oates's "beautiful" Gothic-themed narrative for its style, Braithwaite repeats the caveat: "Babysitter is a ghost story without the ghosts, but with tension thick enough to inspire several heart attacks. Read with care."

Reviewer Valerie Taylor at BookTrib Taylor finds Oates's profuse application of parenthetical remarks "jarring", perhaps leading readers "to either to stop and ingest the words or to simply ignore them." Describing the novel as "disturbing" and "stunning," the narrative presents a litany of social horrors set in late 1970s America, which "could just as easily have been ripped from today's headlines." Taylor cautions: "Babysitter is not for the faint of heart."

Kirkus Reviews calls Babysitter "a searing work of slow-burning domestic noir."

== Sources ==
- Braithwaite, Oyinkan. 2022. "Joyce Carol Oates's "Babysitter" is a serial killer." New York Times, August 22, 2022. https://www.nytimes.com/2022/08/22/books/review/babysitter-joyce-carol-oates.html Accessed 08 March, 2025.
- Oates, Joyce Carol. 2022. Babysitter. Alfred A. Knopf, New York. ISBN 978-0-593-53517-2
- Taylor, Valerie. 2022. "The Babysitter is Out for Blood in New Joyce Carol Oates Thriller." BookTrib, August 22, 2022. https://booktrib.com/2022/08/22/the-babysitter-is-out-for-blood-in-new-joyce-carol-oates-thriller/ Accessed 8 March 2025.
