= Small Avalanches and Other Stories =

Book by Joyce Carol Oates

- First edition
- Author: Joyce Carol Oates
- Language: English
- Publication date: 2003

Small Avalanches and Other Stories is a young adult collection of short stories by Joyce Carol Oates. It was her second young adult book and, as of January 2007, her only collection of short stories for young adults. It was published in 2003 by HarperTempest, an imprint of HarperCollins.

== Stories ==
The collection includes a mix of previously published and new stories. The following stories appear:

- Where Are You Going, Where Have You Been?
- The Sky Blue Ball
- Small Avalanches
- Haunted
- Bad Girls
- How I Contemplated the World...
- Shot
- Why Don't You Come Live With Me It's Time
- Life After High School
- Capricorn
- The Visit
- The Model
