= Prism International =

Canadian literary magazine

- Categories: Literary magazine
- Frequency: Quarterly
- Publisher: University of British Columbia
- Founded: 1959
- Country: Canada
- Based in: Vancouver
- Language: English
- Website: prismmagazine.ca
- ISSN: 0032-8790

Prism International (styled PRISM international) is a magazine published quarterly in Vancouver, British Columbia, Canada. Established in 1959, it is Western Canada's senior literary magazine. The magazine was started with name Prism and five years later its name changed to Prism International. The focus of the magazine is contemporary fiction and poetry, but it also publishes drama and creative non-fiction.

The rendering of the name is idiosyncratic: "PRISM" is intentionally all upper-case and "international" is all lower case.
