= Man Crazy =

1997 novel by Joyce Carol Oates

First edition cover (Dutton)

Man Crazy is a novel by Joyce Carol Oates, published in 1997, that tells the story of a young girl's descent into self-harm, sexual abuse, cult brainwashing, and subsequent rescue.

== Plot summary ==
Man Crazy is told from the point of view of a young woman, Ingrid Boone, writing to her therapist about her life. At the beginning of the novel Ingrid's father, Luke Boone, a hot tempered Vietnam veteran, is absent and on the run after killing a man over a drug deal. Ingrid and her beautiful mother, Chloe Boone, drift from place to place as Chloe carries out a series of relationships with different men. Chloe's attention is directed to her lovers and to alcohol more than to her daughter.

In adolescence, Ingrid begins to self-harm, compulsively scratching her face and body to the point of inflicting sores. She also turns to promiscuity and drug abuse. She doesn't have any real friends and is known as "Doll Girl" as she openly gives herself to much of the school's male population.

Despite her troubles, Ingrid is a good student and wins a prize for a poem, which she is asked to read at a school assembly. Her anxiety and low self-esteem cause her to appear in front of the school with her face bloody from scratching and reading, not her own, but another poet's work.

After leaving home, Ingrid gets involved with Enoch Skaggs, a brutal, charismatic leader of the motorcycle gang/cult, Satan's Children. Her nickname becomes "Dog Girl" because of her blind devotion to the cruel Skaggs. She undergoes one dehumanizing act after another: gang rape, physical mutilation, being locked in a cellar for days, and watching a sacrificial killing. In a last-minute escape, Ingrid is rescued when there is a showdown between the biker gang and the police.

Ingrid undergoes counseling, including the telling of her story, and a suggestion is given of a relationship with her doctor.

== Literary criticism ==
Brigitte Frase of the San Francisco Chronicle called the novel well-constructed but seemingly constructed from psychological profiles of dysfunctional families, traumatized war veterans, and cult leaders and followers. A. O. Scott of the New York Review of Books felt that the violence seemed gratuitous because of the "absence of a persuasive context" and that Skaggs's hold over Ingrid was insufficiently explained. Scott called the prose "fluid but impersonally competent".
