= Joyce Carol Oates bibliography =

List of the published work of the American writer Joyce Carol Oates.

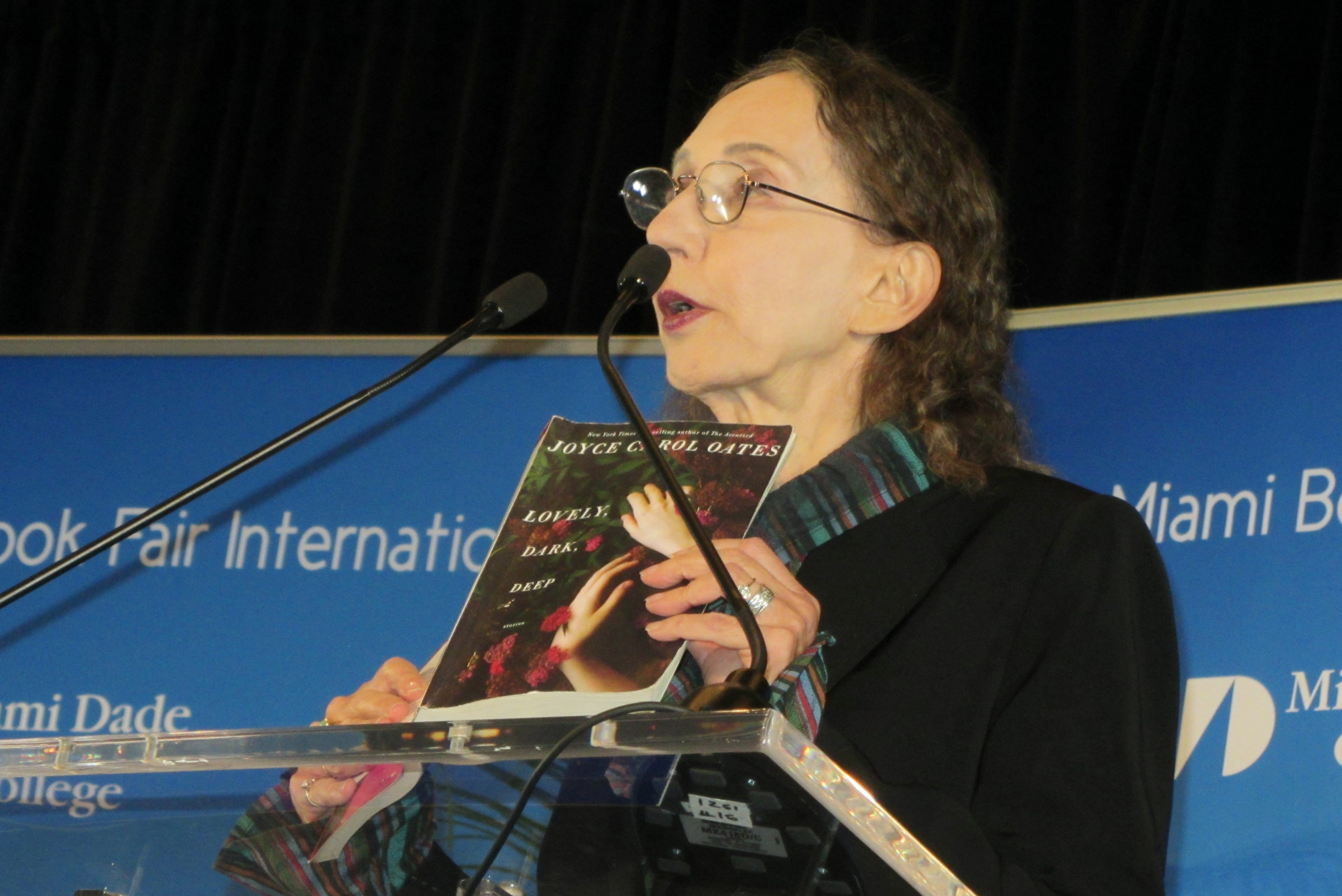
Oates at the Miami Book Fair International 2014

== Novels ==
- With Shuddering Fall (1964)
- Do With Me What You Will (1973)
- The Assassins: A Book of Hours (1975)
- Childwold (1976)
- Son of the Morning (1978)
- Cybele (1979)
- Unholy Loves (1979)
- Angel of Light (1981)
- Solstice (1985)
- Marya: A Life (1986)
- You Must Remember This (1987)
- American Appetites (1989)
- Because It Is Bitter, and Because It Is My Heart (1990)
- Foxfire: Confessions of a Girl Gang (1993) (the basis for the 1996 film Foxfire)
- What I Lived For (1994)
- Zombie (1995)
- We Were the Mulvaneys (1996)
- Man Crazy (1997)
- Broke Heart Blues (1999)
- Blonde (2000)
- Middle Age: A Romance (2001)
- I'll Take You There (2002)
- The Tattooed Girl (2003)
- The Falls (2004)
- Missing Mom (2005)
- Black Girl / White Girl (2006)
- The Gravedigger's Daughter (2007)
- My Sister, My Love (2008)
- Little Bird of Heaven (2009)
- Mudwoman (2012)
- Daddy Love (2013)
- Carthage (2014)
- The Sacrifice (2015)
- Jack of Spades: A Tale of Suspense (2015)
- The Man Without a Shadow (2016)
- A Book of American Martyrs (2017)
- Hazards of Time Travel (2018)
- My Life as a Rat (2019)
- Pursuit (2019)
- Night. Sleep. Death. The Stars. (2020)
- Breathe (2021)
- Babysitter (2022)
- 48 Clues into the Disappearance of My Sister (2023)
- Butcher: A Novel (2024)
- Fox (2025)

=== The Wonderland Quartet ===
- A Garden of Earthly Delights (1967)
- Expensive People (1968)
- them (1969)
- Wonderland (1971)

=== The Gothic Saga ===
- Bellefleur (1980)
- A Bloodsmoor Romance (1982)
- Mysteries of Winterthurn (1984)
- My Heart Laid Bare (1998)
- The Accursed (2013)

=== As Rosamond Smith ===
- Lives of the Twins (1987) (U.K. title: Kindred Passions)
- Soul/Mate (1989)
- Nemesis (1990)
- Snake Eyes (1992)
- You Can't Catch Me (1995)
- Double Delight (1997)
- Starr Bright Will Be With you Soon (1999)
- The Barrens (2001)

=== As Lauren Kelly ===
- Take Me, Take Me With You (2004)
- The Stolen Heart (2005)
- Blood Mask (2006)

== Short fiction ==
=== Collections ===
- By the North Gate (1963)
- Upon the Sweeping Flood and Other Stories (1966)
- The Wheel of Love and Other Stories (1970)
- Marriages and Infidelities (1972)
- The Goddess and Other Women (1974)
- The Hungry Ghosts: Seven Allusive Comedies (1974)
- Where Are You Going, Where Have You Been?: Stories of Young America (1974)
- The Poisoned Kiss and Other Stories from the Portuguese (1975)
- The Seduction and Other Stories (1975)
- Crossing the Border (1976)
- Night-Side: Eighteen Tales (1977)
- All the Good People I've Left Behind (1979)
- A Sentimental Education (1980)
- Last Days: Stories (1984)
- Wild Saturday (1984)
- Raven's Wing (1986)
- The Assignation (1988)
- Oates in Exile (1990)
- Heat and Other Stories (1991)
- Where Is Here? (1992)
- Where Are You Going, Where Have You Been?: Selected Early Stories (1993)
- Haunted: Tales of the Grotesque (1994)
- Demon and Other Tales (1996)
- Will You Always Love Me? And Other Stories (1996)
- The Collector of Hearts: New Tales of the Grotesque (1998)
- Faithless: Tales of Transgression (2001)
- I Am No One You Know: Stories (2004)
- The Female of the Species: Tales of Mystery and Suspense (2006)
- High Lonesome: New & Selected Stories, 1966–2006 (2006)
- The Museum of Dr. Moses: Tales of Mystery and Suspense (2007)
- Wild Nights! (2008)
- Dear Husband (2009)
- Sourland: Stories (2010)
- Give Me Your Heart: Tales of Mystery and Suspense (2011)
- Black Dahlia & White Rose (2012)
- Evil Eye: Four Novellas of Love Gone Wrong (2013)
- High Crime Area: Tales of Darkness and Dread (2014)
- Lovely, Dark, Deep: Stories (2014)
- The Doll-Master and Other Tales of Terror (2016)
- DIS MEM BER and Other Stories of Mystery and Suspense (2017)
- Beautiful Days: Stories (2018)
- Night-Gaunts and Other Tales of Suspense (2018)
- The Ruins of Contracoeur and Other Presences (2021)
- The (Other) You (2021)
- Night, Neon: Tales of Mystery and Suspense (2021)
- Extenuating Circumstances: Stories of Crime and Suspense (2022)
- Zero-Sum: Stories (2023)
- Flint Kill Creek: Stories of Mystery and Suspense (2024)
- The Frenzy (2026)

=== Novellas ===
- The Triumph of the Spider Monkey (1976), new ed. 2019, collected with Love, Careless Love (1974)
- I Lock My Door Upon Myself (1990)
- The Rise of Life on Earth (1991)
- Black Water (1992)
- First Love: A Gothic Tale (Illustrated by Barry Moser) (1996)
- Beasts (2002)
- Rape: A Love Story (2003)
- The Corn Maiden and Other Nightmares (2011)
- A Fair Maiden (2010)
- Patricide (2012)
- The Rescuer (2012)
- Cardiff, by the Sea: Four Novellas of Suspense (2020)

== Young adult fiction ==
- Big Mouth & Ugly Girl (2002)
- Small Avalanches and Other Stories (2003)
- Freaky Green Eyes (2003)
- Sexy (2005)
- After the Wreck, I Picked Myself Up, Spread My Wings, and Flew Away (2006)
- Two or Three Things I Forgot to Tell You (2012)

== Children's fiction ==
- Come Meet Muffin! (1998)
- Where Is Little Reynard? (2003)
- Naughty Chérie! (2008)
- The New Kitten (2019)

== Drama ==
=== Full-length plays ===
- Sunday Dinner (1965)
- The Sweet Enemy (1970)
- Miracle Play (1973)
- Black (1989)
- In Darkest America (1990)
  - The Eclipse
  - Tone Clusters
- I Stand Before You Naked (1990)
- American Holiday (1990)
- The Secret Mirror (1991)
- Bad Girls
- Black Water (1997)
- The Passion of Henry David Thoreau

=== One-act plays ===
- Ontological Proof of My Existence (1970)
- The Triumph of the Spider Monkey (1979)
- How Do You Like Your Meat? (1990)
- Friday Night (1990)
- Greensleeves (1991)
- The Key (1991)
- The Ballad of Love Canal (1991)
- Under/Ground (1991)
- Here I am
- Duet
- Good to know you
- Poor Bibi
- Here She Is! (1995)
- Negative (1995)
- Homesick (1995)
- The Adoption (1996)
- No next of kin
- When I Was a Little Girl and My Mother Didn't Love Me (1998)
- Dr. Magic (2002)
- Wild Nights! (2009)
- Grandpa Clemens & Angelfish 1906 (2009)

=== Collections ===
- Three Plays (1980)
- Twelve Plays (1991)
- The Perfectionist and Other Plays (1995)
- New Plays (1998)
- Dr. Magic: Six One Act Plays (2004)
- Wild Nights! and Grandpa Clemens & Angelfish 1906: Two One Act Plays (2009)

== Essays and memoirs ==
- Oates, Joyce Carol (1972). The edge of impossibility: tragic forms in literature. New York: Vanguard Press. ISBN 9780814906750.
- The Hostile Sun: The Poetry of D.H. Lawrence (1973)
- New Heaven, New Earth: The Visionary Experience in Literature (1974)
- The Picture of Dorian Gray: Wilde’s Parable of the Fall (1980)
- Contraries: Essays (1981)
- The Profane Art: Essays & Reviews (1983)
- On Boxing (with photographs by John Ranard) (1987, revised edition 2006)
- (Woman) Writer: Occasions and Opportunities (1988)
- George Bellows: American Artist (1995)
- They Just Went Away (1995)
- Where I've Been, And Where I'm Going: Essays, Reviews, and Prose (1999)
- "A Fragmented Diary in a Fragmented Time" (2003) published in Narrative Magazine
- The Faith of A Writer: Life, Craft, Art (2003)
- Uncensored: Views & (Re)views (2005)
- The Journal of Joyce Carol Oates: 1973-1982 (2007)
- In the Absence of Mentors/Monsters (2009)
- In Rough Country (2010)
- A Widow's Story: A Memoir (2011)
- Joyce Carol Oates creates Evangeline Fife, who interviews Robert Frost: Lovely, Dark, Deep (2013) published in "Dead Interviews"
- — (June 10–17, 2013). "After Black Rock". True Crimes. The New Yorker. Vol. 89, no. 17. pp. 96–97.
- The Lost Landscape: A Writer's Coming of Age (2015)
- "Nighthawk: Recollections of a Lost Time" (2015) published in Narrative Magazine
- "The Lost Sister: An Elegy" (2015) published in Narrative Magazine
- Soul at the White Heat: Inspiration, Obsession, and the Writing Life (2016)

== Poetry ==
=== Collections ===
- Women in Love and Other Poems (1968)
- Anonymous Sins & Other Poems (1969)
- Love and Its Derangements (1970)
- Angel Fire (1973)
- Dreaming America (1973)
- The Fabulous Beasts (1975)
- Season of Peril (1977)
- Women Whose Lives Are Food, Men Whose Lives Are Money (1978)
- Invisible Woman: New and Selected Poems, 1970–1982 (1982)
- The Time Traveler (1989)
- Tenderness (1996)
- American Melancholy: Poems (2021)

=== List of poems ===
Title	Year	First published	Reprinted/collected
Too young to marry but not too young to die	2013	Oates, Joyce Carol (August 5, 2013). "Too young to marry but not too young to die". The New Yorker. Vol. 89, no. 23. pp. 56–57.	

== Book reviews ==
Date	Review article	Work(s) reviewed
2015	Oates, Joyce Carol (February 16, 2015). "You will get yours : a novel of rage and revenge in the N.Y.P.D." The Critics. Books. The New Yorker. Vol. 91, no. 1. pp. 72–73.	Brandt, Harry (2015). The Whites. Holt.
