= Little Bird of Heaven =

2009 novel by Joyce Carol Oates

- First edition
- Author: Joyce Carol Oates
- Language: English
- Published: 15 September 2009; Ecco Press
- Publication place: United States
- Media type: Print (hardback)
- Pages: 443 pp
- ISBN: 978-0-06-182983-3
- OCLC: 310399122
- Dewey Decimal: 813/.54 22
- LC Class: PS3565.A8 G73 2007
- Preceded by: My Sister, My Love
- Followed by: A Fair Maiden

Little Bird of Heaven is a 2009 novel by Joyce Carol Oates. It is her 38th published novel. The novel is the third set in the fictional city of Sparta, NY, which was also a main setting for her two previous best-sellers We Were the Mulvaneys and The Gravedigger's Daughter.

== Plot summary ==
Zoe Kruller, a wife and mother, is found brutally murdered. The Sparta police target two primary suspects: her estranged husband, Delray Kruller, and her longtime lover, Eddy Diehl. In turn, the Krullers' son, Aaron, and Eddy Diehl's daughter, Krista, become obsessed with each other, each believing the other's father is guilty. By the novel's end, the fated lovers, meeting again as adults, are at last ready to exorcise the ghosts of the past and come to terms with their legacy of guilt, misplaced love, and redemptive yearning.

== Reception ==
The novel was shortlisted for the 2011 International Dublin Literary Award.
