= Night, Neon =

2021 short story collection by Joyce Carol Oates

Night, Neon: Tales of Mystery and Suspense
- First edition
- Author: Joyce Carol Oates
- Language: English
- Genre: Mystery, Suspense
- Publisher: The Mysterious Press
- Publication date: 2021
- Publication place: United States
- Media type: Print (hardback)
- Pages: 299
- ISBN: 978-1-61316-230-9

Night, Neon: Tales of Mystery and Suspense is a collection of short fiction by Joyce Carol Oates published in 2021 by The Mysterious Press. The volume comprises eight short stories and a novella, "Night, Neon."

The story "Parole Hearing, California Institution for Women, Chino, CA" won the Pushcart Prize, XLVI: Best of the Small Presses and was included in The Best American Mystery and Suspense, 2021.

== Stories ==
- "Detour" (Harper's Magazine, March 2021)
- "Curious" (Salmagundi, Spring/Summer 2021)
- "Miss Golden Dreams 1949" (anthology Collectibles, May 17, 2021)
- "Wanting" (Narrative Magazine, Winter 2018)
- "Parole Hearing, California Institution for Women, Chino, CA" (Boulevard, Spring 2020)
- "Intimacy" (Vice, December 4, 2017)
- "The Flagellant" (anthology At Home in the Dark, April 30, 2019)
- "Vaping: A User's Manual" (anthology The Nicotine Chronicles, September 15, 2020)
- "Night, Neon" (American Short Fiction, Summer 2018)

== Reception ==
Reviewer Ben East at The Guardian regards the collection as classically Oatesian in theme and style; in other words "a disquieting snapshot of American life on the verge of individual or ideological collapse."

Kirkus Reviews regards the stories as less plot-driven and more a collection of horror fantasies presented through "flashbacks, reflections, or complications of their powerful opening tableaux." Indeed, "nightmares is an even more apt term than usual for these stories."

== Theme ==
According to Publishers Weekly, "Abuse, madness, confinement, and flight are prominent themes in this strong collection of nine varied, dark, and disquieting stories from Oates."

== Sources ==
- East, Ben. 2022. "Night, Neon and Other Stories of Suspense by Joyce Carol Oates review – nuanced, not neat, thrillers." The Guardian, March 27, 2022. https://www.theguardian.com/books/2022/mar/27/night-neon-and-other-stories-of-suspense-by-joyce-carol-oates-review-nuanced-not-neat-thrillers Accessed 2 March 2025.
- Oates, Joyce Carol. 2021. Night, Neon: Stories of Mystery and Suspense. The Mysterious Press, New York. ISBN 978-1-61316-230-9
