= Black Dahlia & White Rose =

2012 short story collection by Joyce Carol Oates

- First edition
- Author: Joyce Carol Oates
- Language: English
- Publisher: Ecco/HarperCollins
- Publication date: 2012
- Publication place: United States
- Media type: Print (hardback)
- Pages: 288
- ISBN: 978-0062195708

Black Dahlia & White Rose is a collection of Gothic short fiction by Joyce Carol Oates published in 2012 by Ecco Press.

The title story is a fictional rendering of the early careers of Hollywood starlets Elizabeth Short, dubbed the "Black Dahlia" by the press after her brutal murder in 1947 and her contemporary Norma Jean Baker.

The volume received the 2012 Bram Stoker Award for Superior Achievement in a Fiction Collection, and was shortlisted for the Frank O'Connor International Short Story Award in 2013. The short story "I. D." appeared in Best American Short Stories, 2011.

== Stories ==
Original publisher and date indicated.

Dedication

I

- "Black Dahlia & White Rose" (L. A. Noire: The Collected Stories, Mulholland Books, 2011)

II

- "I.D." (The New Yorker, March 22, 2010)
- "Deceit" (Conjunctions), 57 Fall 2011)
- "Run Kiss Daddy"(New Jersey Noir [Akashic Noir], November 2011)
- "Hey Dad" (Ellery Queen Mystery Magazine, August 2012)
- "The Good Samaritan" (Harper's Magazine, December 2011)

III

- "A Brutal Murder in a Public Place" (McSweeney's, Issue 37, 2011)
- 'Roma!" (Conjunctions, 55 Fall 2010)
- "Spotted Hyenas: A Romance" (The Atlantic online, May 31, 2012)

IV

- "San Quentin" (Playboy, October 2011)
- "Anniversary" (Boulevard, 2011)

== Reception ==
NPR literary critic Alan Cheuse characterizes the stories as "explorations of human loneliness and misery," delivered in the Oatesian style that is both vigorous and "shocking."

Oates bestows life wherever she turns, excavating in what first appears to be ordinary ground and discovering that to live means to be in trouble.

The New York Times reviewer Randy Boyagoda asks rhetorically whether Oates—notable for her "immense productivity" as a writer—offers anything "fresh or urgent" in these 11 short stories. Boyagoda confirms the Gothic nature of the narratives and the author's focus on "the rough fortunes of (mostly) women who think they're in control of their situations but are inevitably proved wrong, sometimes brutally so."

== Sources ==
- Boyagoda, Randy. 2013. Fame and Misfortune. The New York Times, January 18, 2013. https://www.nytimes.com/2013/01/20/books/review/black-dahlia-white-rose-by-joyce-carol-oates.html Accessed 5 March 2025.
- Cheuse, Alan. 2012. Book Review: 'Black Dahlia and White Rose' NPR (transcript), September 18, 2012. https://www.npr.org/2012/09/18/161369272/book-review-black-dahlia-and-white-rose Accessed 10 March 2025.
- Oates, Joyce Carol. 2012. Black Dahlia & White Rose. Ecco/HarperCollins, New York. ISBN 978-0062195708
