= First Love: A Gothic Tale =

1996 novella by Joyce Carol Oates

- First edition
- Author: Joyce Carol Oates
- Illustrator: Barry Moser
- Language: English
- Genre: Gothic novel
- Publisher: Ecco Press
- Publication date: 1996
- Publication place: United States
- Media type: Print (Hardback & Paperback)
- Pages: 85 pp
- ISBN: 0-88001-457-1
- OCLC: 33165822
- Dewey Decimal: 813/.54 20
- LC Class: PS3565.A8 F57 1996
- Preceded by: Zombie
- Followed by: We Were the Mulvaneys

First Love: A Gothic Tale is a novella by American novelist and essayist Joyce Carol Oates and illustrator Barry Moser. It tells the story of Josie S_____, a girl who goes to stay at her aunt's mansion in upstate New York. While there, she has an incestuous relationship with her cousin, Jared. The novella deals with two of the more common recurring themes in Oates' work: "teenage initiation and perplexing and problematic love."

== Plot summary ==
11-year-old Josie arrives in upstate New York to live with her great-aunt after her mother abandons her father for no apparent reason. There, she meets her 25-year-old cousin, Jared, who is studying to be a minister. Her stay is very unpleasant; she is physically and psychologically abused by both her mother and great-aunt. She is also bullied without mercy at her new school. Her mother turns her away for love and comfort. Feeling abandoned and unloved, she turns to Jared for the affection she longs for. However, Jared's intents are anything but to love and care for her. He uses false affection to get her to self-mutilate herself, drink her own blood, look at pornographic material, and endure verbal abuse from him. He soon begins sexually abusing her, which Josie mistakes to be him expressing true love to her, although she knows that what they are doing is wrong. Jared attempts to force Josie to kidnap a very young girl for him at which point Josie is able to finally resist, leading to the breakdown of the relationship with Jared. The novella ends with Jared's return to the seminary and with Josie looking forward to a new chapter in her life.
