= DIS MEM BER and Other Stories of Mystery and Suspense =

Short fiction by Joyce Carol Oates

- First edition
- Author: Joyce Carol Oates
- Language: English
- Genre: Gothic
- Publisher: The Mysterious Press
- Publication date: 2017
- Publication place: United States
- Media type: Print (hardback)
- Pages: 256
- ISBN: 978-0802126528

DIS MEM BER and Other Stories of Mystery and Suspense is a collection of Gothic genre short fiction by Joyce Carol Oates published in 2017 by The Mysterious Press.

The story "The Crawl Space" was the winner of the 2016 Bram Stoker Awards, Superior Achievement in Short Fiction, and nominated for the 2017 Edgar Awards, Best Short Story.

== Stories ==
Selected periodical or book of original publication are indicated.

- "DIS MEM BER" (Boulevard, 2016)
- "The Crawl Space" (Ellery Queen, 2016)
- "Heartbreak" (Taking Aim, ed. Michael Cart HarperCollins 2015)
- "The Drowned Girl" (Boulevard, 2016)
- "The Situations" (Vice, 2016)
- "Great Blue Hero" (Black Feather: Bird Horror ed. Ellen Datlow, Pegasus Publications, 2017)
- Welcome to Friendly Skies! (Idaho Review, 2017)

== Reception ==
Kirkus Reviews compares the stories favorably to those of 19th century Gothic writer Edgar Allan Poe:

Oates creates worlds and minds as overwrought and paranoid as anything a female Poe could imagine, then sprinkles her trademark exclamation points licentiously through the interior monologues to heighten the intimacy between ecstasy and madness.

Literary critic Eric K. Anderson in Bearing Witness praises the collection's skillful grafting of "psychological realism with genre writing."

"[W]hat makes these intense stories so emotionally compelling is the economically precise way in which Oates portrays the fractured states of mind of her troubled protagonists."

Anderson adds: "This collection dramatically teases out many ambiguities of human nature and confronts truth that refuses to remain hidden."

== Sources ==
- Anderson, Eric K. 2018. "Review of Joyce Carol Oates's DIS MEM BER and Other Stories of Mystery and Suspense," in Bearing Witness: Joyce Carol Oates Studies: Vol. 4, Article 6. University of San Francisco. https://repository.usfca.edu/cgi/viewcontent.cgi?article=1028&context=jcostudies Accessed 21 March 2025.
- Oates, Joyce Carol. 2012. DIS MEM BER and Other Stories of Mystery and Suspense. The Mysterious Press, New York. ISBN 978-0802126528
