= Flint Kill Creek: Stories of Mystery and Suspense =

2024 collection of short fiction by Joyce Carol Oates

- First edition
- Author: Joyce Carol Oates
- Language: English
- Genre: Mystery, Suspense
- Publisher: The Mysterious Press
- Publication date: 2024
- Publication place: United States
- Media type: Print (hardback)
- Pages: 288
- ISBN: 978-1613165577

Flint Kill Creek: Stories of Mystery and Suspense is a collection of short fiction by Joyce Carol Oates published in 2024 by The Mysterious Press. The story "Mick & Minn" won the Pushcart Prize XLIX, 2025.

== Stories ==
Periodical and date of original publication provided where available:

- "Flint Kill Creek" (Conjunctions, Vol. 80, Spring 2023)
- "The Phlebotomist" (Ellery Queen, March/April 2023)
- "The Heiress. The Hireling." (Ellery Queen, September/October 2024)
- "Weekday" (Salmagundi, Issue 222/223, 2024)
- "***" (Weird Fiction Review, titled "The Appointment," Fall 2020)
- "Friend of My Heart" (Conjunctions, Vol. 66, Spring 2016)
- "Bone Marrow Donor" (Ellery Queen, July/August 2021)
- "Happy Christmas" (Vanity Fair, titled "Happy" December 1984)
- "The Nice Girl" (Boulevard, Issue 19, October 5, 2015)
- "Mick & Minn" (Boulevard, Nos 112/113, November 16, 2023)
- "Late Love" (The New Yorker, April 15, 2024)
- "The Siren: 1999" (Ellery Queen, September/October 2023)

== Reception ==
Characterizing each tale as "a compact gem of unease," Publishers Weekly adds "Oates's prose is surgically precise, and her appetite for the grotesque falls on the right side of lurid. The author's admirers will be thrilled."

Kirkus Reviews reports that—the volume's genre designations notwithstanding—"none of these tales is a traditional mystery, and most are suspenseful only in the broad sense that all effective fiction is..."

== Theme ==
Novelist and poet Rod Miller, writing in The New York Review of Books, warns that Oates has condemned her fictional creations to cruel fates: "there are no happy endings for these people."

If the 12 stories have a common theme, it is the confusion, the bewilderment, of the characters she creates. They seem befuddled by relationships, by work, by life in general, even by themselves—unsure of what is happening around and to them, blown about by winds of uncertainty and unable, or unequipped, to cope."

== Sources ==
- Miller, Rod. 2024. "Review: Flint Kill Creek: Stories of Mystery and Suspense." The New York Review of Books.https://www.nyjournalofbooks.com/book-review/flint-kill-creek-stories Accessed 2 March 2025.
- Oates, Joyce Carol. 2018. Flint Kill Creek: Stories of Mystery and Suspense. The Mysterious Press, New York. ISBN 978-1613165577
