= Jack of Spades: A Tale of Suspense =

2015 novel by Joyce Carol Oates

- First edition
- Author: Joyce Carol Oates
- Language: English
- Publisher: The Mysterious Press
- Publication date: 2015
- Publication place: United States
- Media type: Print (hardback)
- Pages: 240
- ISBN: 978-0802125057

Jack of Spades: A Tale of Suspense is a novel by Joyce Carol Oates published in 2015 by The Mysterious Press.

== Plot ==
Jack of Spades is written from a first-person point-of-view by the protagonist Andrew J. Rush.

Rush, in his fifties, is a celebrated mystery author, often referred to as “the gentleman’s Stephen King” by literary critics.

Rush finds himself driven to examine unexplored facets of his persona and adopts the pseudonym “Jack of Spades” under which he secretly publishes lurid and licentious tales, utterly at odds with his respectable public image.

When his two daughters read editions from the Jack of Spades series they are revolted by its violence and misogyny. Rush is further dismayed when he is accused by an unstable woman writer, C. W. Haider, who accuses him of plagiarizing her unfinished manuscripts; the suit is dismissed in court. Nonetheless, Rush is further driven to doubt his literary talents, a dire blow to his self-esteem.

An anxious Rush begins to drink heavily, and finds that his internal monologue is being occupied by his creation, the Jack of Spades. His marriage begins to unravel. He hatches a scheme to enlist Haider as a tool to attack the reputation of Stephen King.

== Reception ==
Praising Jack of Spades for its “compelling psychological suspense,” The Seattle Times reviewer Adam Woog, calls the narrative “smooth—so smooth that readers barely notice how she tightens her silken noose of a plot around their throats.”

Literary critic Eric K. Anderson registers this positive assessment: “Jack of Spades is a fast-paced read filled with high drama and the expertly-rendered delineation of a writer’s descent into madness...It’s also a brilliantly enjoyable tribute to the greatest writers of this popular form of the novel.”

== Sources ==
- Anderson, Eric K. 2015. "Review of Joyce Carol Oates's Jack of Spades". Bearing Witness: Joyce Carol Oates Studies. Vol. 2. University of San Francisco. Accessed 14 March 2025.
- Oates, Joyce Carol. 2015. Jack of Spades: A Tale of Suspense. The Mysterious Press, New York. ISBN 978-0802125057.
- Woog, Adam. 2015. "Crime fiction: the governor’s wife, a writer with a secret." The Seattle Times, May 9, 2015. Crime fiction: the governor’s wife, a writer with a secret Accessed 10 March 2025.
