= Heat and Other Stories =

1991 story collection by Joyce Carol Oates

- First edition
- Author: Joyce Carol Oates
- Language: English
- Publisher: E. P. Dutton
- Publication date: 1991
- Publication place: United States
- Media type: Print (hardback & paperback)
- Pages: 416
- ISBN: 978-0525933304

Heat and Other Stories is a collection of 25 works of short fiction by Joyce Carol Oates published by E. P. Dutton in 1991.

This volume serves as "a postmodernist allegory of contemporary America" in which Oates returns to the settings of her early fiction in rural western New York state.

The story "Yarrow" won the O. Henry Award in 1991.

== Stories ==
Heat and Other Stories is divided into three parts, and includes the following stories. All were previously published, as indicated:

I

- "House Hunting" (The Kenyon Review, Fall 1987)
- "The Knife" (Redbook, May 1987, as "The Double-Edged Knife")
- "The Hair" (Partisan Review, Summer 1990)
- "Shopping" (Ms., March 1987)
- "The Boyfriend" (The Massachusetts Review, Spring 1988)
- "Passion" (GQ, March 1990)
- "Morning" (Arete, January/February 1990)
- "Naked" (Witness, Winter 1988)

II

- "Heat" (The Paris Review, Spring 1989)
- "The Buck" (Story, Winter 1991)
- "Yarrow" (TriQuarterly, Winter 1987)
- "Sundays in Summer" (Michigan Quarterly Review, Winter 1987)
- "Leila Lee" (Northwest Review, 1989)
- "The Swimmers" (Playboy, December 1989)
- "Getting to Know All About You" (The Southern Review, Summer 1988)
- "Capital Punishment" (The Southern Review, Autumn 1987)
- "Hostage" (anthology Louder Than Words, 1989)
- "Craps" (Boulevard, 1989)
- "Death Valley" (Esquire, July 1988)
- "White Trash" (anthology Lord John Ten: A Celebration, 1988)

III

- "Twins" (The Ohio Review, 1987)
- "The Crying Baby" (New England Review and Bread Loaf Quarterly, Winter 1989)
- "Why Don't You Come Live With Me It's Time" (Tikkun, July/August 1990)
- "Ladies and Gentlemen:" (Harper's Magazine, December 1990)
- "Family" (Omni, December 1989)

== Reception and analysis ==
Literary critic Wendy Lesser in The New York Times reports that Oates's "own enormous body of work" has become a burden that the author carries into her collection Heat and Other Stories, which deal largely with "parent-child struggles." Lesser offers the story "Shopping" as an example of Oates's thematic concerns in this volume: the story is not a Gothic horror reminiscent of Poe, but "transcends" that genre to present normality "in all its terrifying nakedness." She compares Oates's handling of violence in stories with that of fiction writer Paul Bowles:

Mr. Bowles hinges his plots on inevitable violation, and he also aims to shock us...Behind his gruesome tales is a stern moralist, a person who trusts that we readers (if not his characters) are still capable of sharing his disapproval and disgust. Ms. Oates, on the other hand, is as cavalierly cynical as a teen-ager. Her stock in trade is precisely not to seem shocked, and she pretends to be equally, mildly, analytically interested in all forms of human behavior, however grotesque.

Biographer and critic Greg Johnson offered this praise for the collection:"Heat and Other Stories represent Oates's full maturity as a writer of short fiction, the genre that best exploits the versatility and intensity of her narrative gifts."

Booklist also reviewed the collection.

== Sources ==
- Johnson, Greg (1994). Joyce Carol Oates: a study of the short fiction. Twayne's studies in short fiction. New York: Twayne publ. ISBN 978-0-8057-0857-8.
- Lesser, Wendy (August 4, 1991). "The Shopping Mall Wars". The New York Times.
- "Heat and Other Stories". Booklist. August 1991.
