= We Were the Mulvaneys (film) =

2002 film by Peter Werner

- Based on: We Were the Mulvaneys by Joyce Carol Oates
- Teleplay by: Joyce Eliason; Peter Silverman; Nancy Dalton Silverman
- Directed by: Peter Werner
- Starring: Beau Bridges; Blythe Danner; Tammy Blanchard
- Composer: Patrick Williams
- Country of origin: United States
- Original language: English

Production
- Executive producers: Robert M. Sertner; Frank von Zerneck
- Producers: Peter Werner; Randy Sutter
- Cinematography: Neil Roach
- Editor: Tod Feuerman
- Running time: 86 minutes
- Production companies: Adelson Entertainment; Von Zerneck/Sertner Films

Original release
- Network: Lifetime
- Release: April 8, 2002

We Were the Mulvaneys is a 2002 American drama television film directed by Peter Werner, written by Joyce Eliason, Peter Silverman and Nancy Dalton Silverman, and starring Beau Bridges, Blythe Danner and Tammy Blanchard. It is based on the 1996 novel by Joyce Carol Oates. The film tells the story of a middle-class family that is torn apart when a traumatic event happens to one of the teenage children. Like the book, the film is narrated by the family's youngest son, Judd.

We Were the Mulvaneys was filmed in Winnipeg, Manitoba, Canada. It premiered on Lifetime on April 8, 2002. Bridges and Danner were both nominated for Primetime Emmy Awards, along with Patrick Williams for his score.

== Plot ==
In 1974, the Mulvaneys are an esteemed family living in the small town of Mount Ephraim in upstate New York. The family consists of parents Michael and Corinne, and teenagers Mike Jr., twins Patrick and Marianne, and Judd. Mike is a promising high school athlete, Patrick is a studious achiever, Marianne is a saintly cheerleader, and Judd is the youngest. Michael runs a successful roofing business and Corinne devotes her life to the family unit. The Mulvaneys, who live on a farm called High Point, are seen as a model family in the community.

Marianne attends the school Harvest Ball dance, where popular jock Zachary Lundt woos her and gets her intoxicated. He takes her back to his car and rapes her. The following day at home, Marianne keeps the rape to herself but her family senses something is wrong. Corinne finds her at a church during a school day. On the car ride home, Corinne nearly runs over a dog, and the incident triggers Marianne's trauma; through tears, she confesses what happened.

Corinne takes Marianne to a doctor, who confirms she was raped. He advises Corinne that she and Michael need to listen to their daughter and not do anything rash. The rest of the family learns what happened and Michael flies off the handle, begging Marianne to press charges against Zachary. Because Marianne was drunk and cannot remember the details of the rape, she feels guilt and declines to bring charges. Michael goes to the Lundt home alone and physically assaults Zachary and his father Mort, a friend and respected businessman.

News of Michael's assault spreads in town and Marianne becomes the target of nasty gossip and rumors. Mike gets into a fight with Zachary during a school basketball game. Fearing harassment and ostracism from her peers, Marianne again refuses to testify. Michael is furious at her decision and cannot look at his daughter the same way again. He sends her away to live with distant family and develops an alcohol problem which worsens over time. Marianne drifts from place to place as she waits for Michael to reconcile with her.

Michael's alcoholism destroys his business and the family's social standing disintegrates. Mike, Patrick, and Judd each end up leaving home angrily, never to return. Michael and Corinne are forced into bankruptcy and have to sell their farm; they end up splitting. An embittered Patrick decides to exact justice on Zachary and asks Judd to help him get a gun. Patrick follows Zachary home from a bar and abducts him at gunpoint. He takes him to a nearby swamp, where he falls underwater and is about to drown until Patrick realizes that he does not want to kill his worst enemy. He reaches into the mud and saves Lundt's life before leaving him in the wilderness.

Many years later, the Mulvaneys come back together again when Michael is dying of cancer. Marianne returns and makes peace with her father just before he passes away. Corinne asks Marianne for forgiveness for how she reacted to the rape. The family, which has now expanded to include spouses and children, resolve their differences and achieve closure.

== Cast ==
- Beau Bridges as Michael Mulvaney, Sr.
- Blythe Danner as Corinne Mulvaney
- Mark Famiglietti as Michael "Mike" Mulvaney Jr.
- Jacob Pitts as Patrick Mulvaney
- Tammy Blanchard as Marianne Mulvaney
- Tom Guiry as Judd Mulvaney, the narrator
- Shawn Roberts as Zachary Lundt
- Colin Ferguson as Dr. Witt
- John O'Callaghan as Abelove
- Leigh Enns as Trish La Porte
- Jon Ted Wynne as Mort Lundt

== Reception ==
Danner, Bridges, and Blanchard received praise for their performances. Rob Owen of the Pittsburgh Post-Gazette wrote that while the film starts to lose focus in its later half and "some viewers won't be able to comprehend Michael's distance from his daughter", the filmmakers are able to "bring it back to a place of credibility". He added "Danner and Bridges make you believe they're a couple who have been in love for years", and that "all the actors portraying Mulvaneys fit their roles".

The New York Times' Ron Wertheimer wrote that the director and screenwriters "cannot find the emotional essence [in Oates' book] that explains Michael to the viewer's heart. They may simply be outmatched." However, he said "it is Ms. Danner who elevates We Were the Mulvaneys from the level of the usual Lifetime weepie. Even when Corinne, in her devotion to Michael, lets him punish their daughter for being a brute's victim, you understand that she is powerless to confront him. Whether or not you believe the story, you believe in Ms. Danner's Corinne, an insecure and flawed woman who holds tenaciously to the spark of life. Watch this film for her performance, and you won't be disappointed".
