= Dear Husband (short story collection) =

2009 short story collection by Joyce Carol Oates

- First edition cover
- Author: Joyce Carol Oates
- Language: English
- Genre: Short stories
- Publisher: Ecco Press
- Publication date: March 31, 2009
- Publication place: United States
- Pages: 326
- ISBN: 9780061704314
- OCLC: 232977995

Dear Husband is a collection of short stories by Joyce Carol Oates. It was published in 2009 by Ecco Press.

== Stories ==
The book contains 14 stories, all of which have been previously published. The book is broken up into two parts.

=== Part 1 ===
- "Panic" (Michigan Quarterly Review, Summer 2004) – A family deals with their reactions to a potentially deadly situation.
- "Special" (Boulevard, Fall 2007) – Details a girl growing up with an older autistic sister who has disfigured her.
- "The Blind Man's Sighted Daughters" (Fiction, 2007) – A grown woman struggles to deal with her aged father and the knowledge that he is a murderer.
- "Magada Maria" (Timothy McSweeney's Quarterly Concern, 2007) – A story of a woman's slow downward spiral over the years, told from her last boyfriend's point of view.
- "A Princeton Idyll" (The Yale Review, October 2006) – Story told in a series of letters between a woman and a housekeeper regarding the woman's grandfathers death and dissolution of the family.
- "Cutty Sark" (Salmagundi, Spring/Summer 2009) – A man deals with the pressure of having a famous incestuous mother.
- "Landfill" (The New Yorker, October 9, 2006) – Murder mystery centered on a young man's death at a fraternity house.
- "Vigilante" (Boulevard, Fall 2008) – Home from college, the protagonist struggles with drug addiction and an abusive father.
- "The Heart Sutra" (American Short Fiction, Spring 2009) – Two famous poets deal with separation from each other in vastly different fashion.

=== Part 2 ===
- "Dear Joyce Carol" (Boulevard, Spring 2008) – A series of fictional letters written to the author by a stalker.
- "Suicide by Fitness Center" (Harper's Magazine, June 2008) – Depressed a woman attempts suicide at a fitness center.
- "The Glazers" (American Short Fiction, Winter/Spring 2008) – Meeting the family of her boyfriend a woman discovers a dark secret.
- "Mistrial" (Storie, 2003) – Retired librarian is on a jury, but has a secret motive.
- "Dear Husband" (Conjunctions, Fall 2008) – The titular story of the collection. A short final letter from a wife to her husband.
