= The (Other) You =

2021 short story collection by Joyce Carol Oates

- First edition
- Author: Joyce Carol Oates
- Language: English
- Publisher: Ecco Press
- Publication date: 2021
- Publication place: United States
- Media type: Print (hardback)
- Pages: 304
- ISBN: 978-0-06-303520-1

The (Other) You is a collection of short fiction by Joyce Carol Oates published in 2021 by Ecco Press.

== Stories ==
Selected periodical and date of original publication are provided:

1

- "The (Other) You" (Lincoln Center Review)
- "The Women Friends" (Ellery Queen, March/April 2019)
- "The Bloody Head" (Idaho Review, Issue 17, January 1, 2018)
- "Where Are You?" (The New Yorker, July 5, 2018)
- "The Crack" (Salmagundi)
- "Waiting for Kizer" (Conjunctions, Volume 17, Fall 2018)
- "Blue Guide" (Boulevard, Voll. 34, Spring 2019)
- "Assassin" Cutting Edge: New Crime and Mystery Stories by Women ed. Joyce Carol Oates (2019), Akashic Books)

2

- "Sinners in the Hands of an Angry God" (The New Yorker, October 7, 2019)
- "Hospice/Honeymoon" (The New Yorker, July 30, 2020)
- "Subaqueous" (Yale Review, Summer 2021)
- "The Happy Place" (Speaking at Work: A Story of Love, Suspense and Paperclips (2017), by Bernard Schwartz)
- "Nightgrief" (Conjunctions, Vol. 72, Spring 2019)
- "Final Interview" (The Strand, January 21, 2019)
- "The Unexpected" (Harper's Magazine, May 2019)

== Reception ==
A reviewer at City Lights Press describes the stories as fictional counterfactuals, "the other lives we might have led if we'd made different choices." Joyce Carol Oates is lauded for her "arresting and incisive vision...demonstrating here why she remains one of our most celebrated and relevant literary figures."

Publishers Weekly writes: "Oates delivers a dark, moody collection permeated by themes of obsession, remorse, and violence... Oates's mastery of the form remains fierce and formidable in this unsettling collection of lamentations and missed opportunities."

== Theme ==
Literary critic Helen Schulman at the New York Times provides this thematic overview of the volume:

These are dark stories about dark days, suffused, like most of Oates's work, with themes of violence, loss and longing. She offers possibility here, too, but only as if to say that while the myriad choices we can make may produce wildly different journeys, none of us, ultimately, is spared.

== Sources ==
- Oates, Joyce Carol. 2018. The (Other) You. Ecco Press, New York. ISBN 978-0-06-303520-1
- Schulman, Helen. 2021. "Joyce Carol Oates's New Stories Consider the Roads Not Taken." New York Times, February 9, 2021. https://www.nytimes.com/2021/02/09/books/review/joyce-carol-oates-other-you.html Accessed 14 March 2025.
