= The Gravedigger's Daughter =

2007 novel by Joyce Carol Oates

- Author: Joyce Carol Oates
- Language: English
- Genre: Novel
- Publisher: Ecco Press
- Publication date: 1 June 2007
- Publication place: United States
- Media type: Print (hardback)
- Pages: 592 pp (first edition, hardback)
- ISBN: 0061236829 (first edition, hardback)
- OCLC: 70823287
- Dewey Decimal: 813/.54 22
- LC Class: PS3565.A8 G73 2007
- Preceded by: Black Girl / White Girl

The Gravedigger's Daughter is a 2007 novel by Joyce Carol Oates. It is her 36th published novel. The novel was based on the life of Oates's grandmother, whose father, a gravedigger settled in rural America, injured his wife, threatened his daughter, and then committed suicide. Oates explained that she decided to write about her family only after her parents died (in 2000 and 2003), adding that her "family history was filled with pockets of silence. I had to do a lot of imagining."

The novel was completed in the early 2000s but its publication was repeatedly bumped in favor of releasing new Oates novels "her American publisher believed were more 'controversial', such as Missing Mom." The novel's epistolary epilogue was first published as a short story titled "The Cousins" in the July 2004 issue of Harper's Magazine, and was anthologized in The Best American Short Stories of 2005 and in Oates's 2006 collection High Lonesome: New & Selected Stories, 1966–2006. The Gravedigger's Daughter was published on June 1, 2007, and debuted at #17 on the New York Times Best Seller list. The novel was a 2007 finalist for the National Book Critics Circle Award for Fiction.

== Plot summary ==
Rebecca Tignor is mistaken for a woman named Hazel Jones one afternoon in the woods nearby Chatauqua Falls, New York in the fall of 1959. Over 20 years later, Rebecca finds out that the man who approached her is a serial killer.

In a secondary plot, Rebecca's parents escape from the Nazis in 1936, foreseeing the oncoming Holocaust; Rebecca is born in the boat crossing over. When Rebecca is 13, her father, Jacob Schwart, who has lost his intellectual dreams and has become a gravedigger and cemetery caretaker in Milburn, abruptly kills her mother, Anna, and nearly kills Rebecca, before committing suicide. At the time of the footpath crossing, Rebecca is just weeks away from being beaten and almost killed by her own husband, the brutal Niles Tignor. She and her only son, Niles Jr., flee, and she becomes the woman for whom she has been recently mistaken, purposefully adopting the identity of Hazel Jones. Niles Jr. assumes the alias of Zacharias. As Hazel, Rebecca seeks many livelihoods, as alternately a waitress, clerk and finally, the mistress of the overwhelmingly wealthy heir of the Gallagher media fortune, a man in whom she never felt the need to confide her past.
