= The Doll-Master and Other Tales of Terror =

2016 short story collection by Joyce Carol Oates

- First edition
- Author: Joyce Carol Oates
- Language: English
- Publisher: Mysterious Press
- Publication date: 2016
- Publication place: United States
- Media type: Print (hardback)
- Pages: 336
- ISBN: 9781784971038

The Doll-Master and Other Tales of Terror is a collection of short fiction by Joyce Carol Oates published in 2016 by the Mysterious Press.

The volume received the 2016 Bram Stoker Award for Superior Achievement in a Fiction Collection. "Big Mamma" received the Thriller Award in 2017 from International Thriller Writers (ITW) for Best Short Story.

"Gun Accident: An Investigation" won the ITW Best Story Award in 2016, as well as the Year's Best Crime and Mystery Stories, 2016.

== Stories ==
Periodical or book of original publication are indicated.

- "The Doll-Master" (The Doll Collection ed. Ellen Datlow, Tor Books 2015)
- "Soldier" (Idaho Review, 2015)
- "Gun Accident: An Investigation" (Ellery Queen's, July 2015)
- "Equatorial" (Ellery Queen's, December 2014)
- "Big Momma" (Ellery Queen's, March/April 2016)
- "Mystery, Inc." (Mysterious Bookshop Bibliomystery series, 2015)

== Reception ==
New York Times literary critic Terrence Rafferty reports that the stories in The Doll-Master suggest a decline in Oates's powers as a writer of horror fiction. Rafferty cites her 1966 "classic tale of horror" "Where Are You Going, Where Have You Been?" as evidence: "It is, in its chillingly objective way, scarier than anything in Oates's new collection."

Literary critic Erik K. Anderson at Lonesome Reader Blog reminds readers that Oates acknowledges her debt to American writers of Gothic literature-Horror literature, among these Washington Irving, Nathaniel Hawthorne, Edgar Allan Poe, Charlotte Perkins Gilman, and H. P. Lovecraft. Praising the stories as "adeptly-realized," Anderson writes:

With The Doll-Master and Other Tales of Terror, Oates has created unique, gripping stories which take us to the edge of what people are capable of when logic breaks down and minds are plagued by virulent emotions. The terror comes from knowing that with a twist of fate, their stories could become our own.

== Sources ==
- Anderson, Eric K. 2016. Review of Joyce Carol Oates's The Doll-Master and Other Tales of Terror In Bearing Witness: Joyce Carol Oates Studies. Vol. 3, Article 3. University of San Francisco. Accessed 9 March 2025.
- Oates, Joyce Carol. 2012. The Doll-Master and Other Tales of Terror Mysterious Press, New York. ISBN 978-1784971038
- Rafferty, Terrence. 2016. Horror: Joyce Carol Oates's 'The Doll-Master and Other Tales of Terror,' and More The New York Times, June 1, 2016. Accessed 10 March 2025.
