= My Life as a Rat =

Novel by Joyce Carol Oates

- Author: Joyce Carol Oates
- Publisher: Ecco Press
- Publication date: June 4, 2019
- Pages: 416
- ISBN: 978-0-06-289983-5

My Life as a Rat is a novel by American writer Joyce Carol Oates, published by Ecco Press, an imprint of HarperCollins, on June 4, 2019. It follows the life of Violet Rue Kerrigan, who is disowned from her family at the age of 12 after she reveals that her brothers were responsible for the murder of an African American teenager.

== Synopsis ==
Beginning in 1991, My Life as a Rat follows the life of Violet Rue, the seventh and youngest child of the Irish Catholic Kerrigan family in the fictional upstate New York town of South Niagara. After a local African American teenager, Hadrien Johnson, is killed, Violet reveals that two of her older brothers, Jerome, Jr. and Lionel, were involved in his murder. Both brothers are sent to prison for manslaughter.

As a result, Violet is ostracized by her family and sent to live with her mother's sister, Aunt Irma, and her husband, Uncle Iver. There, Violet suffers sexual abuse at the hands of her math teacher, Mr. Sandman, and Uncle Iver. After graduating from high school, she begins working as a maid and enters a toxic relationship with her client, Orlando Metti. During this time she is also enrolled in college courses.

Violet's relationship with Orlando ends, and she runs away, enrolling as a student in a state university. There, she becomes reacquainted with Tyrell Jones, who had also been a student in Mr. Sandman's math class, and is now a graduate student. Violet and Tyrell begin a healthy relationship.

Violet's father dies and she returns to South Niagara, where she hopes to reunite with the surviving members of her family. Lionel, who has been released from prison, attempts to murder Violet, and Violet returns to her life with Tyrell.

== Publication and background ==
An early version of My Life as a Rat was Oates' short story "Curly Red," originally published in Harper's Magazine in 2003. The story was later republished in the 2004 short story collection I Am No One You Know.

When asked about her decision to make the story a novel, Oates said, "I had long meditated upon the life of a girl who had impulsively blurted out the truth under duress, within a few seconds assuring her clannish family will reject her...Over the years I'd accumulated many notes and scenes, and I had always known how Violet's story would develop."

My Life as a Rat was first published in the United States by Ecco Press, an imprint of HarperCollins, on June 4, 2019.

== Reception ==
Critical reviews of My Life as a Rat were mixed. A critic for Kirus Reviews wrote, "Oates explores the long echoes of violence born of sexism and racism in one young woman's like in this deft psychological thriller." Pamela Miller of the Star Tribune called the novel "a near-masterpiece" and "a gripping coming-of-age story, at turns horrifying, heartbreaking, poignant and buoying."

Julie Scheeres of The New York Times criticized the novel's plot, writing, "After a while, Violet's trajectory seemed predictable, her torturous penance too prolonged. I kept hoping for a Lisbeth Salander moment, when she'd start punching the world back."
