= The Falls (Oates) =

2004 novel by Joyce Carol Oates

- First edition
- Author: Joyce Carol Oates
- Language: English
- Publisher: Ecco/HarperCollins
- Publication date: 2004
- Publication place: United States
- Media type: Print (hardback)
- Pages: 496
- ISBN: 978-0060722289

The Falls is a novel by Joyce Carol Oates published in 2004 by Ecco/HarperCollins. The work is the winner of the 2005 Prix Femina étranger and a recipient of the International IMPAC DUBLIN Literary Award for 2006.

== Contents ==
- Honeymoon.
- The Gatekeeper's Testimony : 12 June 1950
- The Bride
- The Fossil-Seeker
- The Widow-Bride of The Falls: The Search
- The Widow-Bride of The Falls: The Vigil
- The Proposal ; 7 July 1950
- Marriage.
- They Were Married
- First-Born
- The Little Family ;
- Before
- And After
- The Underworld
- "Zarjo"
- The Fall
- 1 June 1962
- Family.
- Baltic
- The Woman in Black
- Pilgrims
- Hostages
- Our Lady of the Falls
- The Voices
- Epilogue
- In Memoriam : Dirk Burnaby, 21 September 1978.

== Plot ==
Newlyweds Ariah and Gilbert Erskine are in Niagara Falls for their honeymoon. After Gilbert kills himself by leaping into the rushing waters, Ariah spends seven days beside the falls, waiting for his body to be found. Dirk Burnaby, a young attorney and a pillar of the community, is struck by the young woman and tries to comfort her. The two eventually marry and, despite some volatility due to Ariah's emotional trauma, manage to sustain their marriage and build a family. Dirk embarks on a lawsuit over the toxic waste dumped into Love Canal, damaging his reputation, and then suffers a suspicious death. The book then follows their three children, Royall, Juliet, and Chandler. Reviewers have compared it to her other family epics such as We Were the Mulvaneys.

== Reception ==
A work designed to “overwhelm, to awe” its readers, Niagara Falls serves as a metaphor to advance Oates’s “force-of-nature aesthetic.” New York Times literary critic Terrence Rafferty compared her writing to American novelist Theodore Dreiser, “both in her slovenliness and in her power.”

Characterizing The Falls as “a good read but scarcely a great novel,” critic Maya Jaggi at The Guardian compared the novel unfavorably to Oates’s short fiction.

Reviewer Jane Ciabattari at The Washington Post wrote:

With inimitable virtuosity, Oates weaves the still potent lore of Niagara into her extensive narrative. Using imagery of the river and falls as a driving force, she creates a seamless and engrossing flow that in the end seems natural, inevitable.

Critic Sharan McBride at the Houston Chronicle considered The Falls “mainstream” compared to Oates’s often “violent and obsessive characters” she creates for her Gothic and Horror fiction. Though the author’s style is “jarring”, McBride assured readers, “The Falls is hard to put down.”

== Sources ==
- Ciabattari, Jane. 2004. Taking the Plunge. The Washington Post, September 11, 2004.https://www.washingtonpost.com/archive/entertainment/books/2004/09/12/taking-the-plunge/0ea8a081-2b8a-4c91-a6c8-f6a09357cc42/ Accessed 10 April 2025.
- Jaggi Maya. 2004. On the Edge. The Guardian, October 14, 2004. https://www.theguardian.com/books/2004/oct/16/featuresreviews.guardianreview16 Accessed 10 April 2025.
- McBride, Sharan. 2004. The Falls by Joyce Carol Oates. Houston Chronicle, October 24, 2004. https://www.chron.com/life/article/The-Falls-by-Joyce-Carol-Oates-1579182.php Accessed 10 April 2025.
- Oates, Joyce Carol. 2004. The Falls. Ecco/HarperCollins, New York. ISBN 978-0060722289.
- Rafferty, Terrance. 2004. The Falls: Force of Nature. New York Times, September 19, 2004.https://www.nytimes.com/2004/09/19/books/review/the-falls-force-of-nature.html Accessed 10 April 2025.
