= 48 Clues into the Disappearance of My Sister =

2023 novel by Joyce Carol Oates

- First edition
- Author: Joyce Carol Oates
- Language: English
- Genre: Gothic
- Publisher: The Mysterious Press
- Publication date: 2023
- Publication place: United States
- Media type: Print (hardback)
- Pages: 297
- ISBN: 978-0802125057

48 Clues into the Disappearance of My Sister is a novel by Joyce Carol Oates published in 2023 by The Mysterious Press.

The work was awarded the Prix Fitzgerald in 2025.

== Plot ==
The novel is presented in forty-eight numerically consecutive short chapters organized in three sections. Each chapter opens with an italicized word, term, date, or phrase that may serve as a clue. The novel has no table of contents.

30-year-old sculptor and college art instructor, Marguerite Fulmer, disappeared unexpectedly from her father's exclusive estate in upstate New York on April 11, 1991. She leaves behind hints as to her whereabouts.

Her younger sibling, Georgene, serves as the misanthropic narrator who seeks to unravel the why and wherefore surrounding Marguerite's disappearance.

== Reviews ==
Critic David Pitt at Booklist calls 48 Clues "another masterpiece of storytelling...A thematically and stylistically ambitious novel that displays the author's literary gifts to their maximum effect."

New York Times literary critic Sarah Weinman rates 48 Clues "subpar" among Oates's crime genre fiction: "[W]hat could have been an unnerving tale is marred by truly puzzling stylistic choices (so many parentheticals, one after another!)."

Reviewer Laury A. Egan at New York Review of Books reserves special praise for Oates's disaffected narrator, the "emotionally disturbed" younger sister, Georgene Fulmer

In 48 Clues into the Disappearance of My Sister, Oates has added another disturbing character to her bountiful cast of strange people and devised another chilling work, one that will slot into the vast canon for which she is justly renowned."

== Sources ==
- Egan, Laury A. 2023. '48 Clues into the Disappearance of My Sister." New York Review of Books. https://www.nyjournalofbooks.com/book-review/48-clues-disappearance-my-sister Accessed 05 March, 2025.
- Pitt, David. 2023. "Review: 49 Clues Into the Disappearance of My Sister." Booklist, February 15, 2023. https://celestialtimepiece.com/2023/05/16/48-clues-into-the-disappearance-of-my-sister/ Accessed 9 March 2025.
- Weinman, Sarah. 2023. "A Sculptor's Disappearance, Narrated by Her 'Less Beautiful' Sister." New York Times, March 16, 2023. https://www.nytimes.com/2023/03/16/books/review/new-crime-mystery-books.html Accessed 8 March 2025.
- Oates, Joyce Carol. 2023. 48 Clues into the Disappearance of My Sister. The Mysterious Press, New York. ISBN 978-1-61316-381-8
