= Pursuit (Oates novel) =

2019 novel by Joyce Carol Oates

- Author: Joyce Carol Oates
- Genre: Thriller, Suspense
- Publisher: The Mysterious Press
- Publication date: October 1, 2019
- Publication place: United States
- Pages: 224
- ISBN: 978-0-8021-4791-2

Pursuit is a 2019 thriller and suspense novel by Joyce Carol Oates. It was published in the United States by Mysterious Press on October 1, 2019.

== Plot ==
On her way to work the morning after her marriage to Christian pre-med student Willem, Abby Zengler steps in front of a bus and is severely injured. Willem is shocked by the incident, and is unsure whether Abby had tried to commit suicide by stepping in front of the bus. Just before their wedding, Abby had confessed to Willem that her real name was Miriam, and Willem ponders how little he knows about his new wife, as he has never met her family and knows little about her life before she met him.

When Abby is well enough to speak, she gradually opens up to Willem about her traumatic childhood. The narrative switches between the present and Abby's childhood in Chautauqua Falls, a fictional small town in upstate New York.

Readers learn that Abby's mother, Nicola, married Abby's father, Llewyn Hayman, when she was seventeen years old. Nicola leaves Llewyn, who has become abusive and paranoid since returning from military service in Iraq, but Llewyn is jealous and violent. He is convinced that Nicola cheated on him while he was in Iraq, and coerces Abby (Miriam) into confirming this.

Llewyn begins stalking Nicola, leaving her threatening messages and attempting to enter her home while she is at work. He sends Nicola a postcard to make her think that he has committed suicide because of her rejection of him. Llewyn then kidnaps Nicola, handcuffing her hand to his, and brings her to his family's abandoned farm. Eventually, he takes Nicola into the woods and kills himself, his corpse still handcuffed to Nicola's arm. Nicola begins experiencing hallucinations, and dies in the woods a few days later.

Nicola's family assumes that she has run off with Llewyn and Abby begins living with her aunt at her father's family farm. A few years later, Abby finds her parents' skeletons while playing in the woods. She does not tell anyone about her discovery, but begins having nightmares.

In the present, Abby tells Willem about finding her parents' skeletons, and the couple travels to the farm. Willem finds the skeletons, photographs them, and brings the photos to the police.

== Themes ==
Eric K. Anderson noted in an article for Bearing Witness: Joyce Carol Oates Studies that Pursuit explores the theme of mental illness in veterans through the character of Llewyn Hayman. Anderson writes, "Oates is also cognizant of the way in which violence is taught and bred into some men who enter the armed forces."

== Background and publication ==
Pursuit was published in the United States by Mysterious Press, then an imprint of Grove Atlantic, on October 1, 2019.
