= Night-Gaunts (short stories) =

Night Gaunts and Other Tales of Suspense
- First edition
- Author: Joyce Carol Oates
- Language: English
- Genre: Gothic
- Publisher: The Mysterious Press
- Publication date: 2018
- Publication place: United States
- Media type: Print (hardback)
- Pages: 274
- ISBN: 978-0-8021-2810-2

Night-Gaunts and Other Tales of Suspense is a collection of short stories by Joyce Carol Oates published in 2018 by The Mysterious Press. "The Woman in the Window" was anthologized in The Best American Mystery Stories in 2017.

== Stories ==
Selected periodical and date of original publication are provided:

- "The Woman in the Window" (One Story, June 9, 2016)
- "The Long-Legged Girl" (Kenyon Review, September/October 2017)
- "Sign of the Beast" Amazon Original Stories, November 28, 2017)
- "The Experimental Subject" (Conjunctions, Online Exclusive, Spring 2017)
- "Walking Wounded" (Conjunctions, Vol. 65, Fall 2015)
- "Night-Gaunts" (The Yale Review, October 2017)

== Reception ==
Reviewer Michael Thomas Barry at The New York Review of Books questions the clarity and purpose of these stories:

Overall, there's an oddness to the prose that isn't easily explained and connecting with the characters is difficult...In the end as we traverse the complex labyrinth between purpose and scruples, we're left with more questions than answers.

== Theme ==
The title of the collection is derived from Gothic writer H. P. Lovecraft's autobiographical report of his disturbing childhood nightmares involving faceless monsters. Oates selected the Lovecraft poem "Night-Gaunts" for the volumes's epigraph. His work was originally published in Weird Tales, December, 1939.

Out of what crypt they crawl, I cannot tell,

But every night I see the rubbery things,
Black, horned, and slender, with membranous wings,
They come in legions on the north wind's swell
With obscene clutch that titillates and stings,
Snatching me off on monstrous voyagings
To grey worlds hidden deep in nightmare's well.

Over the jagged peaks of Thok they sweep,
Heedless of all the cries I try to make,
And down the nether pits to that foul lake
Where the puffed shoggoths splash in doubtful sleep.
But ho! If only they would make some sound,

Or wear a face where faces should be found!

Literary critic Eric K. Anderson regards the volume as a suitable homage to Lovecraft and Oates's literary debt to him: "In fact, the titular story which ends the book is a tribute to and a fictional re-imagining of Lovecraft's life."

Anderson adds that the collection as a whole "skillfully invokes the tortured imagination of Lovecraft and form utterly compelling modern tales of suspense."

== Sources ==
- Anderson, Eric K. 2018. Review of Joyce Carol Oates's Night-Gaunts and Other Tales of Suspense. Bearing Witness: Joyce Carol Oates Studies. Vol. 4, Article 5. LonesomeReader Blog. University of San Francisco. https://repository.usfca.edu/cgi/viewcontent.cgi?article=1029&context=jcostudies Accessed March 10, 2025.
- Barry, Michael Thomas. 2018. "Night-Gaunts and Other Tales of Suspense." The New York Review of Books https://www.nyjournalofbooks.com/book-review/night-gaunts Accessed 9 March 2025.
- Oates, Joyce Carol. 2018. Night-Gaunt and Other Tales of Suspense. The Mysterious Press, New York. ISBN 978-0-8021-2810-2
