= Zombie (novel) =

1995 novel by Joyce Carol Oates

- First edition cover art
- Author: Joyce Carol Oates
- Cover artist: Leonard Telesca
- Language: English
- Genre: Fiction, Horror, Thriller
- Published: 1995 (Dutton)
- Pages: 181 pp
- ISBN: 0-525-94045-6
- OCLC: 32168426
- Dewey Decimal: 813/.54 20
- LC Class: PS3565.A8 Z43 1995
- Preceded by: What I Lived For
- Followed by: We Were the Mulvaneys

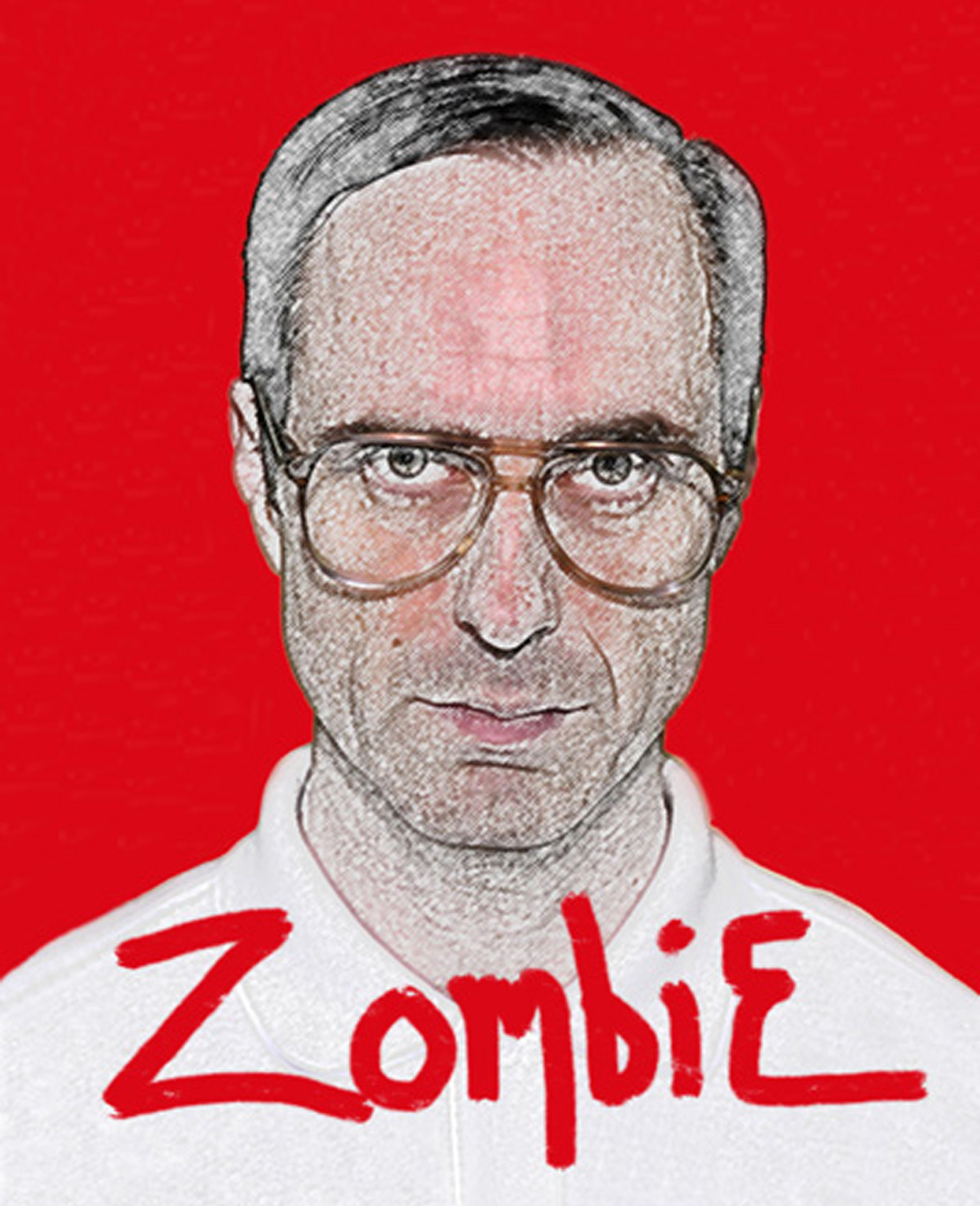

Zombie is a 1995 horror novel by American writer Joyce Carol Oates, which explores the mind of a serial killer. It was based on the life of Jeffrey Dahmer.

Dahmer stated in an interview with Stone Phillips, "The only motive that there ever was to completely control a person, a person I found physically attractive, and keep them with me as long as possible, even if it meant keeping a part of them."

== Plot ==
The protagonist, Quentin P, seeks to create a zombie out of an unsuspecting young man. He intends to find a perfect young male companion and re-wire his brain, thereby turning the victim into a mindless sex slave. His several attempts at creating a zombie, by doing improvised surgery on the victim's brain, all end in failure, however, as the men he abducts, rapes and tortures all die at his hands. By the end of the novel, he has begun to enjoy killing for its own sake.

Adding to his frustrations is his increasingly suspicious family, particularly his father.

== Awards ==
The book won the Bram Stoker Award for Best Novel.

The play adaptation starring Bill Connington and directed by Tom Caruso won awards, including the FringeNYC Overall Excellence Award for Outstanding Solo Show.

== Play adaptation ==
The solo play was first performed at the New York International Fringe Festival, and then opened at the Studio Theatre on Theater Row, on West 42nd Street in New York City. The play was later produced live at John Jay College in New York City. The play starred Bill Connington as Quentin P., and was directed by Thomas Caruso. Joyce Carol Oates was present for a pre-show panel discussion alongside forensic psychologists and serial killer experts from John Jay College. She signed copies of her novel Zombie and A Fair Maiden. The play was also performed at Burien Actors Theatre outside of Seattle via a live Zoom performance. The play was also adapted into a short film. All of the versions were performed by Bill Connington.

The play adaption of Zombie received positive reviews from The New York Times, "Mr. Connington commits totally to this haunting characterization and leaves us wondering exactly what kind of people are walking the streets alongside us." The New York Sun, and Variety, "perfectly counterfeits the experience of sitting in a room with a serial murderer, which is even less comfortable than it sounds." and the New York Post.

== Film adaptation ==
The same team that created the play adaptation of Zombie, created a 19-minute short film that premiered in 2010 and was screened at 21 film festivals, including Cleveland International Film Festival, and Boston International Film Festival. The film won five awards including "Best Short Film (Horror)" at the Washington DC Independent Film Festival, "Best Director" "Best Short Dramatic Screenplay" and "Best Supporting Actor" at the Terror Film Festival in Philadelphia, and "Best First Time Director" at the California Film Awards.
