= Where Is Here? =

Short story collection

- First edition
- Author: Joyce Carol Oates
- Language: English
- Genre: Short story collection
- Publisher: Ecco Press
- Publication date: September 1, 1992
- Publication place: United States
- Media type: Print (hardback & paperback)
- Pages: 208
- ISBN: 978-0880013383

Where Is Here? is a collection containing 34 works of short fiction by Joyce Carol Oates originally published by Ecco Press in 1992.

== Stories ==
- "Lethal" (Ontario Review)
- "Area Man Found Crucified" (Southern California Anthology, Vol. 10 1992)
- "Imperial Presidency" (Boulevard)
- "Bare Legs" (Yale Review, October 1992 [titled "Stand" in England])
- "Turquoise" (New Directions)
- "Biopsy" (New Directions)
- "The Date" (Savvy)
- "Angry" (New York Woman)
- "The Ice Pick" (Raritan, Winter 1992)
- "The Mother" (Shenandoah)
- "Sweet!" (Antaeus, Autumn 1987)
- "Forgive Me!" (Michigan Quarterly Review, Summer 1991)
- "Transfigured Night" (The Boston Globe)
- "Actress" (Michigan Quarterly Review)
- "From The Life of..."
- "The Heir" (The Massachusetts Review, Winter 1985)
- "Shot" (Seventeen)
- "Letter, Lover" (Fiction, Vol. 10, No. 1 & 2 1991)
- "My Madman" (Exile)
- "Cuckold" (Western Humanities Review)
- "The Escape" (TriQuarterly)
- "Murder"
- "Insomnia" (Onthebus)
- "Love, Forever"
- "Old Dog"
- "The Artist" (Omni, May 1992)
- "The Wig" (New Directions)
- "The Maker of Parables" (Kenyon Review, Spring 1990)
- "Embrace" (Western Humanities Review)
- "Beauty Salon" (The Gettysburg Review)
- "Running" (Self)
- "Pain" (The Southern Review)
- "Where Is Here?" (American Short Fiction Number 1, Spring 1991, University of Texas Press)

== Reception ==
Randall Kenan in The New York Times describes Where Is Here as "a dazzling assortment of fictional hors d'oeuvres." emphasizing their "miniature" scale which provides the reader with "a catalog of America's ills at the end of the 20th century: paranoia, political deception, homelessness, adultery, venereal disease, child abuse." Kenan adds that Joyce augments her impressive oeuvre in crafting "these tiny—mostly exquisite—gems."

Publishers Weekly praises the "brief vignettes" that comprise the volume for their "inventiveness and boundless stylistic variety."

== Critical analysis ==
Literary critic Gretchen Elizabeth Schultz characterizes these works as "short, short stories" and provides this passage from Oates's Afterword in her collection The Assignation (1989) to explain the nature of these "miniature narratives":

...They are "narratives" of a particular purity as a steep ski slope is a "hill" of a particular purity— they engender movement so rapid, so blurred, so impersonal, the human personality is swallowed up in narrative; in motion, we are narrative.

Schultz cautions that reading these works may be "a dangerous experience, an assault on individual sensibilities" and as such, require a rereading and an objective assessment of the narratives which will "restore our obliterated selves—though they may be selves considerably different than what they were before."

== Sources ==
- Johnson, Greg (1994). Joyce Carol Oates: a study of the short fiction. Twayne's studies in short fiction. New York: Twayne publ. ISBN 978-0-8057-0857-8.
- Kenan, Randall (November 1, 1992). "Broken Hearts and Other Anatomical Disasters". The New York Times.
- Schultz, Gretchen Elizabeth (1994). "The Assignation and Where Is Here?: What's Happening in the Miniature Narratives of Joyce Carol Oates". In Johnson, Greg (ed.). Joyce Carol Oates: a study of the short fiction. Twayne's studies in short fiction. New York: Twayne publ. pp. 202–212. ISBN 978-0-8057-0857-8.
- Oates, Joyce Carol (1992). Where is here? stories. Hopewell, NJ: Ecco Press. ISBN 978-0-88001-283-6.
- "Where Is Here". Publishers Weekly. November 2, 1992.
