= Daddy Love =

2013 novel by Joyce Carol Oates

- First edition
- Author: Joyce Carol Oates
- Language: English
- Publisher: The Mysterious Press
- Publication date: 2013
- Publication place: United States
- Media type: Print (hardback)
- Pages: 290
- ISBN: 978-0802122247

Daddy Love is a novel by Joyce Carol Oates published in 2013 by The Mysterious Press.

== Plot ==
Dinah Whitcomb and her five-year-old son Robbie are returning to their car in a parking lot when the boy is abducted. In attempting to stop the man's van, Dinah is seriously injured. The kidnapper, an itinerant preacher named Chester Cash (who may or may not have murdered his wife many years ago), takes Robbie across state lines and keeps him a prisoner, forcing the boy to call him "Daddy Love" and accept him as a father figure. Robbie suffers physical, emotional, and sexual abuse at Cash's hands but eventually escapes, though his homecoming is difficult due to the trauma he has suffered.

This is an uncomfortable novel to read; Oates makes us squirm as she forces us to see some of the action through Love’s twisted and warped perspective.

== Reception ==
Kirkus Reviews warns that Daddy Love is “uncomfortable novel to read” due to Oates’s forthright examination of the sociopathic kidnapper’s perspective. The reviewer observes: “Oates raises a troubling question here—whether moral fiction can emerge from a morally reprehensible character.”

New York Times critic Marilyn Stasio praises Oates for her skill crafting “psychological horror stories about seriously disturbed minds,” in this instance the abductor and pederast Chester Czechi - “Daddy Love.” Confessing that Oates’s fiction “gives her the creeps,” Stasio credits the author for providing a sympathetic portrayal of the traumatized parents who “hang on to their humanity while slowly going to pieces.”

== Sources ==
- Oates, Joyce Carol. 2013. Daddy Love. The Mysterious Press, New York. ISBN 978-0802122247.
- Stasio, Marilyn. 2013. Stolen Life. New York Times, January 4, 2013. https://www.nytimes.com/2013/01/06/books/review/daddy-love-by-joyce-carol-oates-and-more.html Accessed 10 April 2025.
