= Cardiff, by the Sea (Oates novellas) =

2020 collection of short fiction by Joyce Carol Oates

Cardiff by the Sea: Four Novellas of Suspense
- First edition
- Author: Joyce Carol Oates
- Language: English
- Genre: Gothic, Suspense
- Publisher: The Mysterious Press
- Publication date: 2020
- Publication place: United States
- Media type: Print (hardback)
- Pages: 402
- ISBN: 978-0-8021-5799-7

Cardiff, by the Sea: Four Novellas of Suspense is a collection of short fiction by Joyce Carol Oates published in 2020 by The Mysterious Press.

The novella "Phantomwise: 1972" was included in The Best American Mystery Stories in 2018. "The Surviving Child" received The Year's Best Fantasy and Horror award in 2020.

== Novellas ==
Periodical and date of original publication provided where available:

- "Cardiff, by the Sea" (Ellery Queen, March 1, 2020)
- "Miao Dao" (Amazon Original Stories, December 27, 2018)
- "Phantomwise: 1972" (Ellery Queen, 2017)
- "The Surviving Child" (Echoes: The Saga Anthology of Ghost Stories, August 20, 2019)

== Reception ==
Publishers Weekly writes: "The four novellas in this spellbinding collection from Oates carefully tread the boundary between psychological and supernatural expressions of the macabre...This superb outing is sure to captivate."

Literary critic Elena Hartwell at the New York Review of Books writes: "Using her remarkable, literary voice to investigate the psychological experiences of victims, Oates requires that we willingly suspend our disbelief and reject realism as a means to identify societal truths."

Reviewer Rob Latham at LARB provides a critical compendium of Oates's oeuvre. Latham writes:

While some of Oates's thrillers verge on classic noir in their hard-boiled tone, the novellas in Cardiff, by the Sea have a more languid, melancholy air, strongly reminiscent of the work of Daphne du Maurier.

Despite the reassuring settings and tone, readers should be prepared for "eruptions of violence as dark and ugly as in any splatter movie."

== Sources ==
- Hartwell, Elena. 2020. "Review: Cardiff, by the Sea: Four Novellas of Suspense." New York Review of Books. October 8, 2020. https://www.nyjournalofbooks.com/book-review/cardiff-sea-four-novellas Accessed 13 March 2025.
- Latham, Rob. 2021. "The Ineluctable Agon of Desire: Joyce Carol Oates's Suspense Fiction." Los Angeles Review of Books, January 8, 2021. https://lareviewofbooks.org/article/the-ineluctable-agon-of-desire-joyce-carol-oatess-suspense-fiction/ Accessed 9 March 2025.
- Oates, Joyce Carol. 2020. Cardiff, by the Sea: Four Novellas of Suspense. The Mysterious Press, New York. ISBN 978-0-8021-5799-7
