= Son of the Morning (Oates novel) =

1978 novel by Joyce Carol Oates

- First edition
- Author: Joyce Carol Oates
- Language: English
- Published: 1978
- Publisher: Vanguard Press
- Publication place: USA
- Pages: 382
- ISBN: 9780814907931
- OCLC: 934025873

Son of the Morning is a 1978 novel by American author Joyce Carol Oates. The book was first published on August 1, 1978 through Vanguard Press.

== Synopsis ==
Elsa Vickery, daughter of an agnostic small-town doctor and his pious wife, is gang-raped at the age of seventeen. Since her father is unable to obtain a legal abortion for her, she has a son, Nathan, who is brought up by his grandmother as a devoted Christian. At the age of seven, Nathan begins to experience visions of Christ. When the boy is eight, his grandfather reads the Gospel for the first time in thirty years and he is horrified, concluding that Jesus was "a cruel psychopath." Soon after this, he dies from a stroke, leaving Nathan completely in the care of his grandmother.

Nathan becomes a boy preacher, and later the charismatic leader of a church, which is accumulating vast riches from donations. With every year, his visions become more and more grandiose. In one episode of the novel, he is almost seduced into fornication and puts out his eye in self-punishment.

After he survives an attack by one of his followers, Nathan goes into hiding, and the church eventually disappears.

== Reception ==
Critical reception for Son of the Morning was mixed. Theology Today criticized the narrator's voice as "improbable" and the "obtrusiveness of biblical parallels and symbolic incidents" while also stating that "the theological and psychological probings in the book are too deep and complex, the reporting of visions and sermons too electric and convincing, the implications too perplexing for post-Jonestown thinking, for Son of the Morning not to be of searching significance for preachers, laypeople, and teachers of literature and theology."

In her essay "Faith and Art: Joyce Carol Oates's Son of the Morning," Sharon L. Dean commented that the narrator's shifting voice allowed Nathan to "write both an objective account of his past and the past surrounding him, much as the Biblical prophets wrote about Christ, and a personal, extended prayer to an absent God."
