= American Appetites =

1989 novel by Joyce Carol Oates

- First edition
- Author: Joyce Carol Oates
- Language: English
- Genre: novel
- Publisher: E. P. Dutton
- Publication date: 1989
- Publication place: United States
- Media type: Print (hardback)
- Pages: 340
- ISBN: 978-0333511893

American Appetites is the 19th novel by Joyce Carol Oates first published in 1989 by E. P. Dutton and reprinted by Harper and Row in 1990.

== Plot ==
The narrative is presented from a third-person point-of-view, with Ian the focal character. The novel is set in the fictional Hazleton-on-Hudson, N.Y., a community that resembles Princeton, New Jersey.

The middle-aged couple, Ian and Glynnis McCullough, are upper-middle-class academics, who live in an affluent and cohesive neighborhood. Ian is a senior fellow at the prestigious Institute for Independent Research in Social Sciences. Glynnis is a gourmet and writer of ethnic food recipe books. Married for 26 years, the couple travel in the circles of the academic elite and enjoy entertaining friends. They have one child, a college-aged daughter. Ian is interrupted at his office by a phone call from a dancer, Sigrid Hunt, an acquaintance of Glynnis, whom he hardly knows. Distraught, Sigrid tells Ian she is pregnant by her Egyptian boyfriend who has threatened to kill her if she seeks an abortion. Dismayed but sympathetic, Ian gives her a $1000 check for the procedure; she promises to reimburse him. Intending to share the episode with Glynnis, Ian delays and, preoccupied with other matters, never tells her.

Months later, Glynnis discovers the cancelled check and instantly suspects the worst. That afternoon she begins to drink, and when Ian arrives home she has worked herself into a jealous rage, accusing him of infidelity. Despite assurances of his innocence, she divulges that she has had extramarital affairs. The confrontation escalates until Glynnis lunges at Ian with a kitchen knife; he reacts by shoving her through a plate glass window in which her skull is fractured. Glynnis survives in a coma for several weeks before dying. Ian is charged with second-degree murder. The ramifications of Ian's indictment on his community, the trial and the reaction from the mainstream press constitute the latter and major part of the book.

Ian's last-minute acquittal is achieved through the testimony of Sigrid who has emerged from hiding. Sigrid testifies she never had an affair with the defendant and praises Ian's humane intervention.

== Reception ==
Noting that Oates's "virtuosity seems inevitably linked to her productivity," critic Robert Towers notes Oates's masterful handling of her characters, singling out Glynnis's dinner party—"a set piece"—as "expertly sustained" and "conducted with admirable pacing and a wealth of appropriate detail."

Towers attributes his "disengagement" from the novel by "the very abundance of information about his thoughts and moods with which we are presented" as well as "the elaborate blandness of the novel's style."

== Theme ==
Representing "the best of civilized virtues" Ian and Glynnis exemplify the "prototypical American success story." The title of the novel is derived from a cookbook Glyniss is preparing for publication: American Appetites. The McCulloughs and friends find themselves vaguely troubled by their existence, rather than content, having achieved the American Dream. Hunger has been eradicated, and mere appetite will not suffice. Biographer Joanne V. Creighton writes:

The novel poignantly shows that the lives people lead, the roles they assume, the structures they build around themselves cannot minister to an inner emptiness, a visceral and undefined hunger.

American appetites cloak "baser emotions, unmet needs...unfulfilled souls."

"This is a devastating portrait because Ian is such a fine example of the civilized, successful, upper-middle-class American. In reaching the empty heart-of-darkness at the core of the American dream—the depletion of idealism, the pointlessness of personal ambition and aspiration—he can be seen as acting out a collective fate."—Joanne V. Creighton in Joyce Carol Oates: Novels of the Middle Years (1992).

Los Angeles Times literary critic Mae Briskin observes that "American Appetites" is notable for its lack of scenes depicting violence.

That which is sinister or "evil" is suggested in the title:

The evil that Oates explores is the evil implicit in the title of the book, "American Appetites." The McCulloughs and their many friends have only appetites--as distinct from hunger--appetites for "gourmet" food, for wine, for sex, for success, and for parties that offer them easy escapes...

Oates describes a social layer that suffers lives isolated from "the world outside them, where there is real, persistent, physical hunger." The appetites the McCulloughs enjoy condemns them to existences that are "bland, deprived, devoid of either commitment or genuine love."

== Sources ==
- Briskin, Mae. 1989. "No Taste for Hunger: American Appetites." Los Angeles Times, January 15, 1989. https://www.latimes.com/archives/la-xpm-1989-01-15-bk-653-story.html Accessed 10 February 2025.
- Creighton, Joanne V.. 1992. Joyce Carol Oates: Novels of the Middle Years. Twayne Publishers, New York. Warren G. French, editor. ISBN 0-8057-7647-8
- Oates, Joyce Carol. 1989. American Appetites. E. P. Dutton, New York. ISBN 978-0333511893
- Towers, Robert. 1989. "Death in a Glass-Walled House." New York Times, January 1, 1989. https://archive.nytimes.com/www.nytimes.com/books/00/04/02/specials/oates-appetites.htm Accessed January 31, 2025.
