= The Poisoned Kiss and Other Stories from the Portuguese =

1975 collection of short stories written by Joyce Carol Oates

- Author: Joyce Carol Oates
- Language: English
- Publisher: Vanguard Press
- Publication date: 1975
- Publication place: United States
- Media type: Print (hardback)
- Pages: 189
- ISBN: 978-0814907610

The Poisoned Kiss and Other Stories from the Portuguese is a collection of short stories written by Joyce Carol Oates. It was published in 1975 by Vanguard Press.

== Background ==
Oates credits the stories in The Poisoned Kiss and Other Stories from the Portuguese to the imaginary author "Fernandes de Briao"; and Oates only listed herself as having translated the stories "from the Portuguese."

In the afterword to the collection Oates states that "the Fernandes stories came out of nowhere: not out of an interest in Portugal (which I have never visited), or a desire to write parables to pierce through the density of existential life that I dramatize in my own writing." She explains that these tales are the result of a remarkable phase of her life. In 1970/71, while being occupied as usual with her own writing, she "began to dream about and to sense, while awake, some other life, or vision, or personality" (p. 187), and she wrote a story which was so strange to her that she felt it was not her own. As she experienced this state again and again during these years, she considers the stories she wrote then "as the expression of a part of my personality that had been stifled" (p. 188), and therefore she was never able to designate herself as the author of these narratives. Oates emphasizes that "Fernandes drifted into my life at a time when I was in normal health" (p. 188) and "retreated when his story seemed to be complete" (p. 189); and she also admits that so far she has not been able to comprehend, to her own satisfaction, what really happened (p. 189).

== Stories ==
Those stories first appearing in literary journals are indicated.

- "Our Lady of the Easy Death of Alferce" (Prism International, Summer 1971)
- "The Brain of Dr. Vincente"
- "Loss" (Southwest Review, Autumn 1971)
- "Parricide" (Yale Review, Spring 1974)
- "The Enchanted Piano" (Harper's Bazaar, June 1971)
- "Distance"
- "In a Public Place" (Transatlantic Review, Spring 1973)
- "The Seduction" (Transatlantic Review, Spring 1973)
- "Maimed"
- "Two Young Men" (Aspen Leaves, June 1974)
- "The Secret Mirror" (December, 1971)
- "The Cruel Master"
- "Sunlight/Twilight" (Transatlantic Review, Spring 1973)
- "Husband and Wife" (Carolina Quarterly, Fall 1972)
- "The Poisoned Kiss" (Greensboro Review, Spring 1974)
- "The Son of God and His Sorrow" (Massachusetts Review, Autumn 1971)
- "The Murderer" (Greensboro Review, Spring 1974)
- "Impotence" (Transatlantic Review, Spring 1973)
- "Letters to Fernandes From a Young American Poet" (Chelsea, June 1972)
- "The Letter" (Literary Review, Fall 1973)
- "Plagiarized Material"
- "Journey" (Transatlantic Review, Spring 1973)

== Critical reception ==
In a review for the Los Angeles Times, Alan Cheuse found the collection pretentious, singling out "Plagiarized Material" as the only "truly successful" story. He concluded: "What [...] could have possessed Joyce Carol Oates to sign her name to such a disastrous collection of stories as this?" Kirkus Reviews questioned if the purpose of the collection was for "[s]elf-exploration or self-indulgence?" In the Library Journal, Bruce Allen wrote that the collection was too ambitious for its medium, with only "Loss" and "Distance" being easily recognizable as Oates' work.

In Studies in Short Fiction, Sanford Pinsker noted that a few of the stories, particularly "Plagiarized Material", were written in a "reflexive trickster" style associated with Jorge Luis Borges. Overall, Pinsker thought the collection invoked "found poetry" and established that Oates "continues to be a writer of haunting fictions extraordinaire."

== Sources ==
- Johnson, Greg. 1994. Joyce Carol Oates: A Study of the Short Fiction. Twayne's studies in short fiction; no. 57. Twayne Publishers, New York. ISBN 0-8057-0857-X
- Lercangee, Francine. 1986. Joyce Carol Oates: An Annotated Bibliography. Garland Publishing, New York and London. ISBN 0-8240-8908-1
- Oates, Joyce Carol. 1975 The Poisoned Kiss and Other Stories from the Portuguese. Random House, New York. ISBN 978-0814907610
