= Haunted: Tales of the Grotesque =

Short story collection by Joyce Carol Oates

- First edition
- Author: Joyce Carol Oates
- Language: English
- Publisher: E. P. Dutton
- Publication date: 1994
- Publication place: United States
- Media type: Print (hardback)
- Pages: 320
- ISBN: 978-0525936558

Haunted: Tales of the Grotesque is a collection of 16 works of short fiction by Joyce Carol Oates published in 1994 by E. P. Dutton. The volume includes an afterword by Oates.

== Stories ==
The collection features 16 stories. All were previously published, as indicated:

PART I

- "Haunted" (anthology The Architecture of Fear, 1987)
- "The Doll" (Epoch, Winter 1979)
- "The Bingo Master" (anthology Dark Forces, 1980)
- "The White Cat" (anthlogy A Matter of Crime, 1987)

PART II

- "The Model" (Ellery Queen's Mystery Magazine, October 1992)

PART III

- "Extenuating Circumstances" (anthology Sisters in Crime 5, 1992)
- "Don't You Trust Me?" (Glamour, August 1992)
- "The Guilty Party" (Glamour, July 1991)
- "The Premonition" (Playboy, December 1992)
- "Phase Change" (anthology Omni Visions One, 1993)

PART IV

- "Poor Bibi" (Tikkun, May/June 1992, as "Poor Thing")
- "Thanksgiving" (Omni, November 1993)
- "Blind" (Worlds of Fantasy & Horror, Summer 1994)
- "The Radio Astronomer" (Antaeus, Spring 1993)
- "Accursed Inhabitants of the House of Bly" (The Antioch Review, Winter 1993)
- "Martyrdom" (anthology MetaHorror, 1992)

== Reception ==
Literary critic Michael Upchurch in The New York Times describes the narratives in this collection as "grotesque", and that "Martyrdom", the last story, "may contain the most gruesome passage Ms. Oates has ever written, offering ample ammunition to anyone wanting to call her on her fascination with all things violent and degrading." In the Afterword, the author herself terms the volume "the very antithesis of 'nice.' " Comparing some of the stories unfavorably to Margaret Atwood's The Handmaid's Tale and Doris Lessing's The Fifth Child Upchurch regards a number of the tales as "variously intriguing but slight."

Noting that the stories in Haunted "seem to move from the horrible to the grotesque," Los Angeles Times literary critic Susan Salter Reynolds writes they "lack heart." She adds: "It doesn't mean they aren't entertaining or 'well-written.' They're just a little slick."

== Critical assessment ==
The stories in Haunted are written in the tradition of Gothic literature with a postmodernist orientation. Johnson observes that these "'tales' are integral to Oates's larger endeavor in fiction, which is to probe relentlessly the complex mysteries of human personality and identity."

In "Accused Inhabitants of the House of Bly", Oates pays tribute to novelist Henry James, revisiting his novella The Turn of the Screw (1898), told from the perspective of the manor's former and now deceased governess, Miss Jessel. However, critic Michael Upchurch chastens Oates' approach for "making explicit everything that is ambiguous in the Henry James novella. Ms. Oates's delicious ambiguity elsewhere in 'Haunted,' notably in 'The Premonition,' makes one wish she had tried a subtler approach when tampering with a masterpiece."

== Sources ==
- Johnson, Greg. 1994. Joyce Carol Oates: A Study of the Short Fiction. Twayne's studies in short fiction; no. 57. Twayne Publishers, New York. ISBN 0-8057-0857-X
- Reynolds, Susan Salter. 1994. Fiction section. The Los Angeles Times, February 13, 1994. FICTION Retrieved 10 November 2023.
- Oates, Joyce Carol. 1990. Haunted: Tales of the Grotesque. E. P. Dutton, Boston, Mass. ISBN 978-0525936558
- Upchurch, Michael. 1994. "Unpleasant Dreams" The New York Times, February 13, 1994. Unpleasant Dreams Retrieved 10 November 2023.
