= All the Good People I've Left Behind =

1979 collection of short stories by Joyce Carol Oates

- First edition
- Author: Joyce Carol Oates
- Language: English
- Publisher: Black Sparrow Press
- Publication date: 1979
- Publication place: United States
- Media type: Print (hardback)
- Pages: 227
- ISBN: 978-0876853955

All the Good People I've Left Behind is a collection of short stories written by Joyce Carol Oates. It was published in 1979 by Black Sparrow Press.

== Stories ==
All of the stories were previously published, as indicated:

- "Eye-Witness" (Michigan Quarterly Review, Winter 1978)
- "The Leap" (Confrontation, Spring–Summer 1978)
- "High" (Southern Review, Winter 1978)
- "Intoxication" (Boston University Journal, February 1977)
- "All the Good People I've Left Behind" (Redbook, May 1977)
- "Sentimental Journey" (South Carolina Review, April 1977)
- "The Tryst" (The Atlantic, August 1976)
- "Walled City" (Queen's Quarterly, Winter 1976)
- "Blood-Swollen Landscape" (Southern Review, Winter 1975)
- "The Hallucination" (Chicago Review, Spring 1975)

== Critical appraisal ==
The title story of the volume exemplifies the thematic scope of the entire collection; and its importance is already indicated by its length. While the whole volume consists of only 227 pages, the story "All the Good People I've Left Behind" is 82 pages long and consists of five parts. It deals with the development of two couples, the Enrights and the Mandels, who both studied at the University of Michigan in 1960; and each of the story's episodes focuses on their situation in 1960, 1963, 1968, 1973, and 1976, revealing both their public lives, their careers, professional successes and failures, and their private sphere, their psychic problems, affairs, and gradual alienation from each other. When they meet, they also recall friends who studied with them in Ann Arbor and most of these people appear in the other stories, which relates them both to this story and to the title of the entire collection.

On the whole these stories mirror the general development from rural settings and characters with a fairly low education in Oates's early short story collections of the 1960s to more urban settings and characters with a higher education in her volumes of the late 1970s. Yet the characters in All the Good People I've Left Behind should not be regarded as individual cases. Their common background and the resultant interrelation of the individual stories suggests that they have to be seen as representatives of that part of the generation which grew up in the 1940s and 1950s, had a higher education and established itself more or less successfully as the upper middle-class in the 1960s and early 1970s. But this volume not only reflects the development of this part of contemporary American society, it also depicts the social, economic, and cultural background of the 1960s and early 1970s; and contrary to the previous collections, Oates pays much more attention to the influence of these factors on the lives of the individual characters.

== Sources ==
- Johnson, Greg (1994). Joyce Carol Oates: a study of the short fiction. Twayne's studies in short fiction. New York: Twayne publ. ISBN 978-0-8057-0857-8.
- Lercangee, Francine. 1986. Joyce Carol Oates: An Annotated Bibliography. Garland Publishing, New York and London. ISBN 0-8240-8908-1
