= Beautiful Days: Stories =

Collection of short fiction stories by Joyce Carol Oates published in 2018

- First edition
- Author: Joyce Carol Oates
- Cover artist: Edward Hopper, Eleven A. M. (1926)
- Language: English
- Genre: Gothic
- Publisher: Ecco/HarperCollins
- Publication date: 2018
- Publication place: United States
- Media type: Print (hardback)
- Pages: 352
- ISBN: 978-0062795786

Beautiful Days: Stories is a collection of short fiction by Joyce Carol Oates published in 2018 by Ecco Press.

The volume includes the story "Undocumented Alien", which won the Pushcart Prize XLII: Best of the Small Presses 2018.

== Stories ==
Selected periodical and date of original publication provided:

I

- "Fleuve Bleu" (Kenyon Review, Vol. 37, No. 5, September/October 2015)
- "Big Burnt" (Conjunctions, Vol. 64, Spring 2015)
- "Owl Eyes" (Yale Review, July 1, 2016)
- "Except You Bless Me" (Salmagundi)
- "The Quiet Car" (Harper's Magazine, October 2016)
- "The Bereaved" (Yale Review, Vol. 103, Number 3, July 2015)

II

- "Les Beaux Jours" (Alive in Shape and Color: 17 Stories Inspired by 17 Different Artists, December 25, 2017. Pegasus Books)
- "Fractal" (Conjunctions, Vol. 68, Spring 2017)
- "Undocumented Alien" (Conjunctions, Vol.67, Fall 2016)
- "Donald Barthelme Saved From Oblivion" (American Short Fiction, 2024)
- "The Memorial Field at Hazard, Minnesota" (Yale Review, Vol. 102, Number 4, October 2014)

== Reception ==
The title of the volume is the English translation for its short story "Les Beaux Jours." New York Times reviewer Benjamin Markovits points out that this Gothic tale was suggested by the "erotic" painting, The Golden Days (1945–1946) by Balthus.

The artwork depicts a girl reclining in a chair, admiring her face in a hand mirror; she is in partial undress. A shirtless young man stokes a fireplace in the background. According to Robert Schaefer at The New York Review of Books, Oates has created "a gothic tale with a portal to horror" through the medium of the Balthus painting. Schaefer provides a clue as to the fate of the female protagonist with this quote: "Will they not hear me when I cry for help?"

Regarding Beautiful Days as a "mixed, occasionally satisfying, volume," Kirkus Reviews describes two tales—"Les Beaux Jours" and "Fractal"—as "surprisingly inventive." The story "Undocumented Alien" is deemed "overly long [and] far less successful."

Citing the short story volume Where Are You Going, Where Have You Been? (1993) as a high-water mark in Oates's career, literary critic Sara Cutaia at the Chicago Review of Books sharply distinguishes this early work with Beautiful Days. Cutaia laments that Oates conveys her character's emotional states at the expense of providing clarity as to their morality and motivations. Cutaia reports these literary offenses:

The unwieldy sentences, lack of commas, and overuse of parentheses are distracting. The insertion of obvious facts and asides can be infuriating, as if readers can't infer the obvious on their own. The writing is heavy with details and belabored paragraphs, and the man-woman dynamic is stuffy and outdated.

== Sources ==
- Cutaia, Sara. 2018. "Is Joyce Carol Oates Trolling Us?" Chicago Review of Books, February 16, 2018. https://chireviewofbooks.com/2018/02/16/joyce-carol-oates-beautiful-days-review/ Accessed 5 March 2025.
- Markovits, Benjamin. 2018. Sex, Lies and Subterfuge Roil Joyce Carol Oates's New Story Collection. New York Times, March 5, 2018. https://www.nytimes.com/2018/03/05/books/review/joyce-carol-oates-beautiful-days.html 03 March, 2025.
- Oates, Joyce Carol. 2018. Beautiful Days: Stories. Ecco Press, New York. ISBN 978-0062795786
- Schaefer, Robert. 2018. Beautiful Days: Stories. New York Review of Books, February 6, 2018. https://www.nyjournalofbooks.com/book-review/beautiful-days Accessed 4 March 2025.
