= Do With Me What You Will =

1973 novel by Joyce Carol Oates

- First edition
- Author: Joyce Carol Oates
- Language: English
- Publisher: Vanguard Press
- Publication date: 1973
- Publication place: United States
- Media type: Print (hardback)
- Pages: 561
- ISBN: 978-0814907504

Do With Me What You Will is a novel by Joyce Carol Oates first published in 1973 by Vanguard Press. A Fawcett Publications paperback edition was issued in 1974.

== Plot ==
Do With Me What You Will is told from a third-person point-of-view, with Elena Howe and Jack Morrissey as the focal characters. The story traces the odyssey of the stunningly beautiful Elena Howe, one evocative of the fairy tale Sleeping Beauty.

The novel is divided into four parts.

PART ONE - Twenty-eight Years, Two Months, Twenty-six days

Elena endures at great psychic cost a traumatic childhood, including a kidnapping by her deranged father from school at age seven. Neglected in a San Francisco rooming house, she learns to immobilize herself to evade detection during his violent outbursts. Her exploitative mother, Ardis, retrieves Elena from welfare hospital and enlists Elena as a child fashion model for profit. As a coping mechanism, Elena adopts a vacant, somnambulist-like demeanor; for years these traumas leave her mute. Her morbid passivity is attractive to some men, which strikes them as ethereal and pure. She is married off to millionaire attorney Marvin Howe, but remains a cipher in her social life and a mystery to herself.

PART TWO - Miscellaneous Facts, Events, Fantasies, Evidence Admissible and Inadmissible

Jack Morrissey's childhood trajectory contrasts with that of Elena, though he too is traumatized. His father, Joseph, commits premeditated murder, but is acquitted on grounds of temporary insanity. The young Jack develops a love-hate relationship with his father's defense lawyer, Marvin Howe, but learns his morally ambivalent approach to law. Jack becomes a civil rights attorney in the South during the civil rights movement. Jack's motivations have less to do with social justice than winning cases for clients he knows are guilty; the innocent he despises. Jack has an epiphany when Mered Dawe, an evangelical Christian who preaches unconditional love, is convicted on a phony marijuana charge.

PART THREE - Crime

During the Dawe court ordeal, Jack and Elena meet and are encouraged by the practitioner of love to unite, though they both are married. During the affair, Elena experiences orgasm and begins to awaken from her Sleeping Beauty-like non-existence. Despite this new self-awareness, Elena is reluctant to fully embrace freedom and retreats into her former void. Jack becomes enraged at her retrogression and they separate. Elena, ill and suicidal, returns to her husband Marvin.

PART FOUR - THE SUMMING UP

Marvin takes Elena to Maine in an attempt to restore her mental health. Elena, however, realizes that to stay in the marriage is to return to her Sleeping Beauty stupor. Finding Marvin physically repellent, he leaves him and goes to Jack, declaring her love for him. They determine to build a life together.

== Reception ==
Reviewer Calvin Bedient at the New York Times regards Oates "at her best" in this novel and consistent with her previous work: "abstract in style, abrasively concrete in subject." Bedient's complaint is the tendency for her work to lose its vigor when narrative strays from "positive action." He equates Oates's thematic concerns with those of Emily Bronte and D. H. Lawrence, namely, "greed, the overreaching, the experimental excitement, in human relationships."

Critic Sarah Sanborn in The Nation considers the novel's weaknesses "scarcely worth discussing" in light of its merits: "Do With Me What You Will is a novel of force, of natural forces. It moves toward conclusion like a glacier; sometimes slowly, alway inevitable, and the spectacle is awe-inspiring."

== Structure ==
The novel's division into a four-part "legalistic structure," bearing legal jargon titles, is meant to evoke a courtroom experience. Oates uses this device sardonically: "The effect of this imposition of a legalistic format is ironic, pointing structurally as well as thematically the inadequacy of the law to define or describe experience."

== Interpretation and appraisal ==
"Do With Me As You Will is the most affirmative of Oates's novels depicting, as no other does, achieved selfhood and liberation through love. - Biographer Joanne V. Creighton in Joyce Carol Oates (1979)

Literary critic Linda W. Wagner emphasizes that though Oates's feminist affinities are weak, her protagonist, Elena, achieves a measure of liberation:

Oates has never been considered a feminist writer (indeed, she has sometimes been criticized because her women characters are seldom self-actualizing, and often victimized).

In Oates's "most affirmative" fiction to date, biographer Joanne V. Creighton provides its distinguishing feature:

Elena, its central female character, is the culmination and epitome of the several women without a self In Oates's novels, but she is the only one who is awakened and redeemed through love.

In Elena's personal journey, Oates demonstrates that "women can break out of stultifying sexual stereotypes and approach life with zestful independence."

As to the "credibility" of the female protagonist Elena, Crieghton questions whether readers will be convinced that she awakens, "Sleeping Beauty"-like, to achieve self-hood through orgasm: "Oates's characters sometimes fail to coalesce as credible creations or fail to arouse the reader's empathy and concern.

Creighton adds that though "somewhat sentimentalized," Do With Me As You Will challenges those critics who would classify Oates as a writer concerned primarily with grotesque or misanthropic portrayals of humanity.

Creighton reminds readers that the title of the novel - "do with me as you will" - resonates with the legal plea nolo contendere (I do not wish to contend). This reflects Elena's ultimate rejection of the criminality of her adultery.

== Sources ==
- Bedient, Calvin. 1973. "Do With Me What You Will" By Joyce Carol Oates." The New York Times. October 14, 1973. https://www.nytimes.com/1973/10/14/archives/do-with-me-what-you-will-by-joyce-carol-oates-561-pp-new-york.html Accessed 15 January 2025.
- Creighton, Joanne V. 1979. Joyce Carol Oates. Twayne Publishers, New York. Warren G. French, editor. ISBN 0-8057-7212-X
- Johnson, Greg. 1987. Understanding Joyce Carol Oates. University of South Carolina Press, Columbia, South Carolina. ISBN 0-87249-524-8
- Johnson, Greg. 1994. Joyce Carol Oates: A Study of the Short Fiction. Twayne's studies in short fiction; no. 57. Twayne Publishers, New York. ISBN 0-8057-0857-X
- Oates, Joyce Carol. 1973. Do With Me What You Will. Vanguard Press, New York. ISBN 9780814907504
- Sanborn, Sara. 1974. "Two Major Novelists All by Herself." The Nation, January 5, 1974. P. 20-21 in Critical Essays on Joyce Carol Oates. Linda W. Wagner, editor. pp. 32–35. G. K. Hall & Co., Boston, Massachusetts. ISBN 0-8161-8224-8
- Wagner, Linda W. 1979. Critical Essays on Joyce Carol Oates. G. K. Hall & Co., Boston, Massachusetts. ISBN 0-8161-8224-8
