= Broke Heart Blues =

1999 novel by Joyce Carol Oates

- First edition
- Author: Joyce Carol Oates
- Language: English
- Publisher: E. P. Dutton
- Publication date: 1999
- Publication place: United States
- Media type: Print (hardback)
- Pages: 369
- ISBN: 978-0525944515

Broke Heart Blues is a novel by Joyce Carol Oates published in 1999 by E. P. Dutton.

== Contents ==
- KILLER BOY
- MR. FIX-IT
- THIRTIETH REUNION

== Reception ==
"In rereading, I feel a clutch of the heart, and tears starting in my eyes, on virtually every page: this is indeed a scrapbook of emotionally intense memories, of a time when I was not an adult, not a published writer, but a high school girl staring and listening as if my life depended upon it, not even knowing how I was memorizing this idyllic suburban world in which I did not belong except as a visitor from the north country."—Joyce Carol Oates on her novel Broke Heart Blues in 2024.

Literary critic Daniel T. Max at The New York Times regards Broke Heart Blues as one of Oates's lighter novels, but which "displays great inventiveness and a justified belief in its relevance to our own emotional lives."

Writing in Salon.com, critic Michelle Goldberg laments that Oates has abandoned her "psychological acuity" for sentimentality and a "cloyingly nostalgic atmosphere." As such, the novel resembles Gothic The Big Chill:

[I]nstead of brimming with the acid poetry and cruel insights that usually enliven her fiction, this novel ends up as mired in banality as its cast of sad, stuck, middle-aged adolescents.

== Theme ==
The theme of the work is simple: "It's about how lonely, unhappy people mythologize their adolescence."

Oates offered her own retrospective take of her novel's thematic elements:

Here is, I would suppose, an absolutely faithful portrait of upper-middle-class American suburban life in the 1950s: not a cruel satire, or any sort of satire at all, but rather a tenderly observed comedy of manners, a more realistic portrayal of American life of that era than its representation in the much-loved illustrations of Norman Rockwell.

== Sources ==
- Goldberg, Michelle (July 28, 1999). "Broke Heart Blues". Salon magazine. Archived from the original on April 26, 2012.
- Max, Daniel T. 1999. Class Reunion. New York Times, August 8, 1999. https://archive.nytimes.com/www.nytimes.com/books/99/08/08/reviews/990808.08maxlt.html Accessed April 7, 2025.
- Oates, Joyce Carol. 1999. Broke Heart Blues. E. P. Dutton, New York. ISBN 978-0525944515
- Oates, Joyce Carol. 2024. "Intoxicating Nostalgia of High School." Joyce Carol Oates on Writing Broke Heart Blues. Literary Hub.https://lithub.com/a-valentine-to-the-intoxicating-nostalgia-of-high-school-joyce-carol-oates-on-writing-broke-heart-blues/ Accessed 10 April 2025.
