= The Assassins: A Book of Hours =

1975 novel by Joyce Carol Oates

- First edition
- Author: Joyce Carol Oates
- Language: English
- Publisher: Vanguard Press
- Publication date: 1975
- Publication place: United States
- Media type: Print (hardback)
- Pages: 568
- ISBN: 978-0814907672

The Assassins: A Book of Hours is a novel by Joyce Carol Oates first published in 1975 by Vanguard Press. A Fawcett Publications paperback edition was issued in 1976.

== Plot ==
"The Assassins is the story of Andrew Petrie, a wealthy right-wing political figure with a reputation for ruthless honesty. More, it is the story of his surviving brothers, Hugh and Stephen, and of his young widow Yvonne. Members of a large, prominent family, they are nevertheless isolated, each alone with his own enemy, his own assassin. In a state of frozen panic, they realize that Andrew's death has robbed them of the object of their hatred, love, religious compassion—all-consuming emotions that had previously cushioned them against the nightmare of their own emptiness. Their conflicting interpretations of reality—as well as the baffling, tragic events that overtake them—constitute a revelation of the contemporary world, both political and private."

== Reception ==
Contemporary reaction to the novel varied widely. Newsweek's Peter S. Prescott deemed The Assassins "a very bad, nearly incoherent novel." Critic Leo Robson at The New Yorker characterizes The Assassins as an "unfairly derided mystic-politico-psycho-sexual thriller."

== Retrospective appraisal ==
Critic G. F. Waller calls Oates's dystopian vision of America an inflection point in her fiction and "her most forbidding novel to date." Waller summarizes its thesis:

The Assassins seems to reach this despairing conclusion: we are bound to a world into which we have been thrown, a world measured by the "hours" of the novel's subtitle from which there is apparently no escape.

Biographer and literary critic Joanne V. Creighton reports that The Assassins stands in sharp contrast to Oates's previous novel Do With Me As You Will (1973) with respect to "spirit": The Assassins "is a grim book offering no hope for the tormented incompleteness of its characters." In a novel where "critical facts are obscured," the novel tends to "defy both understanding and credibility. Crieghton continues:

Technically intricate and thematically complex, this novel is not as illuminating as the reader would wish, even after repeated readings, because at critical junctures one is not given enough guidance through a Jungian maze...in spite of its rich symbolic and thematic complexity, is very nearly an unreadable book, and a large measure of the problem is that it is hard to care about any of the Petries."

Creighton chastens Oates for numerous passages that exhibit "a lamentable verbosity," offering the following as evidence:

[Yvonne] wanted only for it to end, to end. She wanted only for it to end. For everything to end. Now that she knew, now that she new they were here, why Andrew had died, now that she knew as if from the inside these strangers with their individual faces, this crowd of voices...now that she knew them...how could anything endure it, such a carnival?...now that she understood, she wanted only for it to end.

Acknowledging the difficulty inherent in conveying in prose "the inchoate emotional experiences of humans," Crieghton registered doubt that Oates's "profuse writing" proves a useful literary approach.

== Sources ==
- Creighton, Joanne V.. 1979. Joyce Carol Oates. Twayne Publishers, New York. Warren G. French, editor. ISBN 0-8057-7212-X
- Johnson, Greg. 1987. Understanding Joyce Carol Oates. University of South Carolina Press, Columbia, South Carolina. ISBN 0-87249-524-8
- Johnson, Greg. 1994. Joyce Carol Oates: A Study of the Short Fiction. Twayne's studies in short fiction; no. 57. Twayne Publishers, New York. ISBN 0-8057-0857-X
- Oates, Joyce Carol. 1973. The Assassins. 1975. Vanguard Press, New York. ISBN 978-0814907511
- Robson, Leo. 2020. "The Unruly Genius of Joyce Carol Oates." The New Yorker, June 29, 2020. June 29, 2 020https://www.newyorker.com/magazine/2020/07/06/the-unruly-genius-of-joyce-carol-oates Accessed 10 February 2025.
- Wagner, Linda W. 1979. Critical Essays on Joyce Carol Oates. G. K. Hall & Co., Boston, Massachusetts. ISBN 0-8161-8224-8
- Waller, G. F. 1979. "Through Obsession to Transcendence: The Laurentian Mode of Oates's Recent Fiction." in Critical Essays on Joyce Carol Oates. 1979. pp. 161–173. G. K. Hall & Co., Boston, Massachusetts. ISBN 0-8161-8224-8
