= After the Wreck, I Picked Myself Up, Spread My Wings, and Flew Away =

2006 young adult novel by Joyce Carol Oates

- First edition
- Author: Joyce Carol Oates
- Language: English
- Genre: Young adult novel
- Publisher: HarperTeen
- Publication date: August 22, 2006
- Publication place: United States
- Pages: 304
- ISBN: 0-06-073525-2

After the Wreck, I Picked Myself Up, Spread My Wings, and Flew Away is a young adult novel written by Joyce Carol Oates. First published in 2006, it is her fifth novel for teenagers.

== Plot summary ==
After Jenna Abbott nearly dies in the car wreck on the bridge that took her mother's life, she finds herself longing for the peace of the "blue"—the drug-filled haze she experienced in hospital—and steals drugs from her uncle's medicine cabinet. This sets her down a self-destructive path, and towards her classmate, the mysterious biker Crow, who is the one person she can confide in.

== Reception ==
Critical reception for the book has been positive, with the School Library Journal praising the book's print and audio forms, calling it "powerful." Commonsensemedia wrote that After the Wreck was a "raw look at loss and addiction best for older teens." Kirkus Reviews wrote that the book's ending was "wrapped up a bit too simply considering all of Jenna's issues" but that "Oates's variation on a stream-of-consciousness style is appropriate for the voice of a character who spends so much time in her own head." Booklist stated "There is too much going on, with everything spelled out, including the metaphor of her need to cross over the treacherous bridge. But Oates gets the contemporary teen voice just right, and Jenna's first-person narrative moves at breakneck speed." Publishers Weekly called the book "intense," saying it had an "inspiring conclusion."
