= Randy Boyagoda =

Canadian writer, intellectual and critic (born 1976)

- Born: 1976 (age 49–50); Oshawa, Ontario, Canada
- Education: Trinity College, The University of Toronto, Boston University
- Occupations: Writer, Professor and Director of Jackman Humanities Institute at the University of Toronto
- Writing career
- Period: 2005–present
- Website: randyboyagoda.com

Soharn Randy Boyagoda (born 1976) is a Canadian novelist, essaying and literary critic. He is a professor of English at the University of Toronto and is the director of the Jackman Humanities Institute. He is the author of the novels Governor of the Northern Province (2006), Beggar's Feast (2011), Original Prin (2018), Dante's Indiana (2021), and Lords of Serendipity (2026), as well as a biography of the Canadian-American Catholic intellectual Richard John Neuhaus (2015).

Boyagoda writes contemporary fiction rich in satire, moral seriousness and comic relief that deals with Catholicism and the complex questions of a life lived in faith, South Asian identity, family life and the politics of higher education. The Walrus described Boyagoda's work as being deeply Catholic and deeply funny, and The American Conservative described him as one of the best satirical writers today. His novels have received critical attention in Canada and internationally: Governor of the Northern Province was a finalist for the 2006 Scotiabank Giller Prize, while Beggar's Feast was nominated for the International Dublin Literary Award and selected as a New York Times Book Review Editors' Choice. In addition to his literary work, Boyagoda has written book reviews, essays and criticism on literature, Catholicism, publishing, technology and public life for publications including The New York Times, The Atlantic, The Guardian, Financial Times, The Wall Street Journal, The Globe and Mail, The Times Literary Supplement, The Walrus, Harper's Magazine, and The Paris Review.

== Biography ==
Boyagoda was born in 1976 in Oshawa, Ontario, to parents who had immigrated to Canada from Sri Lanka. He was raised in Oshawa in a Roman Catholic family.

He began writing as a child. In grade two, he wrote an acrostic poem for a classmate and later recalled that his teacher’s strong reaction to it made him realize how writing could affect other people. By the age of nine, he was writing short stories. Boyagoda has described his principal influences as “faith, fiction, and family life”, which include the Catholic intellectual tradition; the work of William Faulkner, Saul Bellow, Philip Roth and Dante; his upbringing as the son of Sri Lankan immigrants; and his experiences as a husband and father.

Boyagoda studied English at Trinity College in the University of Toronto where he received a Bachelor of Arts degree in 1999. He then pursued graduate study in English at Boston University, where he earned a master’s degree in 2001 and a doctorate in 2005. His doctoral work focused on twentieth-century American literature, particularly the relationship between immigration, hybridity, and national identity in the fiction of Salman Rushdie, Ralph Ellison, and William Faulkner.

While studying at Boston University, Boyagoda met his wife, Anna. The couple later settled in Toronto and now live in the city’s East End with their four daughters.

== Career ==
Following the completion of his doctoral studies, Boyagoda held a postdoctoral fellowship and a concurrent appointment as an Assistant Professor of English at the University of Notre Dame. In 2006, he joined the English department at Ryerson University (now Toronto Metropolitan University) where he taught American Studies. During his time there, he served as chair of the English department and director of Zone Learning, the university’s experiential-learning program that helps students pursue startup companies as part of their studies. In 2006, he also published his first novel, Governor of the Northern Province.

In 2011, Boyagoda published his second novel, Beggar's Feast, followed by a biography of Fr. Richard John Neuhaus in 2015. He served as president of PEN Canada from 2015 to 2017 and later joined the organization’s advisory council. In July 2016, he became principal and vice-president of the University of St. Michael’s College at the University of Toronto. He also founded the Gilson Seminar in Faith and Ideas, an exclusive seminar for students in their first-year of studies at the University of Toronto. He was also appointed professor in the University of Toronto’s Department of English and to the Basilian Chair in Christianity, Arts and Letters. As a professor, Boyagoda teaches courses in modern literature, ideas and culture.

Boyagoda's third novel, Original Prin, was published in 2018. From 2020-2026, he served as vice-dean, undergraduate, in the University of Toronto’s Faculty of Arts and Science. He also served as acting vice-provost for faculty and academic life and, in 2024, became the university’s provostial advisor on civil discourse. In July 2026, he became director of the Jackman Humanities Institute and the dean’s special advisor in the humanities. He has also served as chair of the Scotiabank Giller Prize Jury (2019), and was named by Toronto Life magazine as one of the 50 most influential Torontonians of 2024 because of his work in civil discourse.

== Writing ==
=== Fiction ===
Boyagoda's first novel, Governor of the Northern Province was published in 2006. A political satire, it follows Sam Bokarie, a former African warlord who obtains asylum in a small Ontario community and becomes involved in the campaign of an ambitious local politician. The novel was a finalist for the 2006 Scotiabank Giller Prize. Books in Canada described Randy Boyagoda as the Evelyn Waugh of the North from his debut novel, and the book was described by the National Post as an "auspicious debut.”

His second novel, Beggar’s Feast has been published around the world to critical acclaim, by Penguin Canada in 2011, Perera-Hussain (Sri Lanka) and Penguin US in 2012, Harper-Collins India in 2013, and Penguin UK in 2014. Told in four parts, this historical novel traces the life of Sam Kandy, who is born into poverty in British Ceylon in 1899 and dies a hundred years later as the wealthy headman of the same village–a self-made shipping magnate and the father of 16 who has been married three times and widowed twice. Beggar's Feast was nominated for the 2012 International Dublin Literary Award and named a 2012 New York Times Book Review Editor's Choice selection. The Globe and Mail called it a "a post-colonial Gatsby", and The New York Times, described "a gleaming novel that tells the tale of a Ceylonese Odysseus.”

Boyagoda’s third novel, Original Prin (2018), introduces Prin, a middle-aged Catholic English professor who works at a Catholic college in downtown Toronto. After surviving cancer, Prin commits to becoming a better husband and father. His pursuit of this goal is interrupted by the imminent shutdown of his college and the arrival of Prin’s ex-girlfriend from graduate school, Wende, who is now working as a consultant to the college. Divinely inspired, Prin agrees to travel to the Middle East with Wende to launch an academic partnership, where he is drawn into political and religious extremism. The New York Times Book Review described it as an unusual comedy of literary and cultural references and praised its ingenuity. The Walrus praised the novel’s satire of academia, describing Boyagoda as “a master of the set piece” and comparing Original Prin to classic campus novels such as Kingsley Amis’s Lucky Jim and Malcolm Bradbury’s The History Man. The novel was selected as one of The Globe and Mail’s best books of 2018. The Toronto Star called the novel "fresh and utterly original".

Prin's story continues in the sequel, Dante's Indiana (2021) where the estranged and financially struggling Prin moves to a small town in Indiana to work for an evangelical businessman constructing a theme park based on Dante's Inferno. Against the background of the American opioid epidemic, racial conflict and religious politics, Prin attempts to repair his marriage and reconcile his own religious beliefs. In The Wall Street Journal, Sam Sacks compared the novel’s social satire to that of George Saunders and Salman Rushdie, and that it is well combined with Prin’s more solemn and inward religious searching. The Toronto Star praised Boyagoda's use of Dante to address contemporary crises, while Kirkus Reviews' characterized the book as an inventive satire whose comedy is accompanied by seriousness and empathy. The novel was a finalist for the 2022 ReLit Award and was selected by the Winnipeg Free Press as one of its top reads of 2021.

Lords of Serendipity, Boyagoda's sixth novel, is scheduled for publication on 3 September 2026. Set between contemporary Sri Lanka and the United States, the novel follows two teenage girls pursuing admission to elite American universities. Devi, the daughter of a hotel cleaner in rural Sri Lanka, studies with an online tutor who claims to attend Oxford, while Katrina, a middle-class American student, has been raised around the expectation that she will attend a prestigious liberal arts college. Through their parallel stories and the sacrifices made by their families, the novel shows the educational ambition, class inequality, and corruption involved in the politics of twenty-first-century higher education. In an advance review, Publishers Weekly described the novel as an engrossing drama and praised its examination of competition, corruption and exploitation within higher education. Booklist praises its treatment of parental sacrifice, and of the lengths people across different social classes take for prestige in higher education. The Bookseller described it as "a sly, wickedly funny campus novel about ambition, hustle and how far our parents will go for their children."

=== Non-fiction ===
Boyagoda’s second book, a monograph based on his doctoral dissertation, was published in 2008. In this book, he argues that the work of Salman Rushdie, Ralph Ellison, and William Faulkner reveals a century-long transformation of how American identity and experience have been imagined, and that these transformations have been provoked by new forms of immigration and by unanticipated mixings of cultures and ethnic groups. His scholarly work (on such authors as Herman Melville, Don DeLillo, and Flannery O'Connor) has also appeared in journals including the Southern Literary Journal, Studies in American Culture, and South Asian Review.

In 2015, Boyagoda published a biography of Richard John Neuhaus, a project supported by the Social Sciences and Humanities Research Council of Canada. Neuhaus (1936-2009) was the prolific and influential Catholic priest and New York intellectual whose lifelong effort was to argue for the place of religion in American public life, something he did as a radical Leftist and Lutheran minister and as a Catholic priest. Boyagoda's biography, entitled Richard John Neuhaus: A Life in the Public Square, met with wide critical attention, with notable reviews running in The New York Times, Wall Street Journal, and Globe and Mail.

=== Essays and Criticism ===
Alongside his fiction and scholarship, Boyagoda is a frequent contributor of literary criticism, book reviews and cultural commentary in a number of outlets, including The New York Times, The Wall Street Journal, The Atlantic, The Walrus, Commonweal, First Things and The Globe and Mail.

His criticism has ranged from classical literature to contemporary publishing controversies. In his article “Homer’s Reach,” published in First Things, Boyagoda reviews Emily Wilson’s translation of the ''Iliad' and argues against the idea that Homer’s language “should enable immediate comprehension,” and then makes the case that texts like the Iliad matter because they force the modern reader to encounter a world with moral stakes, gods and values unlike our own. In his 2020 The Atlantic essay “The ‘American Dirt’ Controversy Is Painfully Intramural”, he argued that the dispute surrounding Jeanine Cummins’s novel exposed conflicts and inequalities within the publishing industry more than literature’s capacity to transform the wider political debate over immigration. His argument has subsequently been discussed in scholarship on the representation of migration.

Boyagoda’s essays often begin with a public event–a stabbing, a terrorist attack, a city in mourning–and use it to examine literature, faith and the ways communities understand themselves. In The Atlantic article “To Support Salman Rushdie, Just Read Him,” written after Rushdie was stabbed in 2022, Boyagoda argued that meaningful solidarity with Rushdie required engaging with Rushdie’s work as literature, rather than reducing him to a symbol of the controversy surrounding the Satanic Verses. In the New York Times essay “Is This Toronto?,” published after the 2018 Toronto van attack, he reflected on the disruption of the city’s self-image as a peaceful and diverse metropolis, arguing that Toronto could no longer take its civic character for granted even if the city's values remained intact. In The New York Times piece “The Tragic Familiarity of the Sri Lanka Bombings,” Boyagoda wrote as a Catholic member of the Sri Lankan diaspora that the Easter bombings made Sri Lanka newly “familiar” to the wider world by placing it within a global pattern of terrorism while also bringing back memories of the country’s own long history of political violence and uneasy pluralist coexistence.

Religion has been a recurring subject in Boyagoda’s nonfiction. In his 2013 First Things essay “Faith in Fiction”, he argues against treating religious fiction as a tradition confined to the past and calls on readers, writers and critics to take seriously contemporary fiction that engages faith as a living intellectual and imaginative concern. The essay became one of his most discussed pieces: First Things later described it as “now infamous”, and Cassandra Nelson identified Boyagoda as one of the prominent participants in a broader debate about the role of Catholicism in contemporary literature.

His later religious commentary has extended these concerns to questions of technology. In “The Catholic Case against Artificial Intelligence”, published in The Walrus in 2025, Boyagoda frames the Catholic objections to artificial intelligence as part of a larger crisis about what kind of beings human beings are, and what kind of society they are building. He also wrote “The Pope’s Admirers Are Missing Something”, in The Atlantic, where he shows that Pope Leo XIV’s encyclical on AI was less a critique of technology itself than a broader argument about the moral and spiritual conditions that make such technology possible in the first place.

== Bibliography ==
- Governor of the Northern Province: A Novel (2006), ISBN 9780670065646
- Race, Immigration and American Identity in the Fiction of Salman Rushdie, Ralph Ellison, and William Faulkner (2008) ISBN 9780415979849
- Beggar's Feast: A Novel (2011–2014), ISBN 9780670065639
- Richard John Neuhaus: A Life in the Public Square (2015), ISBN 978-0307953964
- Original Prin (2018), ISBN 978-1771962452
- Dante's Indiana (2021), ISBN 978-1771964272
