= The Tattooed Girl =

2003 novel by Joyce Carol Oates

- Author: Joyce Carol Oates
- Language: English
- Publisher: Ecco Press
- Publication date: 2003
- Publication place: United States
- Pages: 307 pp
- ISBN: 978-0061136047

The Tattooed Girl is a 2003 novel by American writer Joyce Carol Oates.

== Plot ==
Alma Busch, a 27-year-old woman from Akron, Pennsylvania with mysterious tattoos of unknown origin on her body, arrives in the affluent town of Mount Carmel in upstate New York. She is spotted by a man named Dmitri Meatte, a waiter at "The Café" who becomes her pimp and boyfriend. Alma meets a novelist named Joshua Seigl, who takes her on as an assistant for his next novel even though she steals and destroys his work and hates him for being Jewish.

== Reception ==
In a review for The Guardian, author Toby Litt called the novel "a completely gripping tale told in an almost manically propulsive style". Sophie Harrison's review in The New York Times was more critical of its "showy unsqueamishness" and uneven characterization.
