= Butcher: A Novel =

2024 novel by Joyce Carol Oates

- First edition
- Author: Joyce Carol Oates
- Language: English
- Publisher: Alfred A. Knopf
- Publication date: 2024
- Publication place: United States
- Media type: Print (hardback)
- Pages: 333
- ISBN: 978-0-593-53777-0

Butcher: A Novel is a historical novel by Joyce Carol Oates published in 2024 by Alfred A. Knopf.

The Gothic genre work is a fictional rendering of the medical careers of three professionals educated and practicing medicine in the 19th century. These are J. Marion Sims, M.D., Silas Weir Mitchell, M. D., and Henry Cotton, M. D., notable researchers and practitioners in, respectively, gynecology, neurology, and psychology.

== Contents ==
Dedication
Epigraph
Editor's Note
Prologue
Part I: Young Doctor Weir Editor's Note

- Exile: Morris County, New Jersey—1837
- The Hermitage, Ho-Ho-Kus, New Jersey—1839
- Early Years as a Practitioner—1846-1851
- Summons to Trenton—1851

Part II: New Jersey State Asylum for Female Lunatics

- Destiny
- The Vow
- Fistula
- Miracle (March 11, 1852)
- Miracle (Postscript)
- Misfortune
- Reversal of Fortune

Part III: The Pioneer Reformer

- Sacred Monomania
- Esther C__
- Christian Burial
- The Chair of Tranquility
- Halcyon Years
- The Humbling
- Slander
- Nurse-Assistant
- The Laboratory: The Experiment
- Fever
- Day of Triumph
- The Gift

Part IV: Red-Handed Butcher

- God's Chosen
- Wilhelmina S__: The Twins
- "Spare the Rod, Spoil the Child..."
- The Penitent
- God's Blessing, God's Wrath.

Part V: The Insurrection

- Lost Girl, Found: An Orphan's True Story Told by Herself

Part VI: Epilogue: Afterlife

- The Promise
- The Pledge

== Reception ==
Publishers Weekly writes: "Oates's scathing indictment of the physical and psychological treatment of women by the medical establishment makes for compulsive but challenging reading. Unlike the ghastly procedures depicted, Oates's inventive Gothic novel pays off."

Eric K. Anderson at LonesomeReader Blog calls Butcher "an arresting, horrifying and impactful novel" in which Oates exposes "how misogyny is built into the medical profession leading to a near total ignorance about how the human body actually works."

Commenting on Oates's productivity as a writer—"almost compulsive, verging on the hypergraphic"—critic Daphne Merkin praises Butcher for its "feverish energy, narrative propulsion and descriptive amplitude—sometimes to excess—of much of her earlier work."

In a positive review, Kirkus Reviews called the novel "Vintage Oates: splendidly written, and a useful warning to choose your doctors wisely."

== Sources ==
- Anderson, Eric Karl. 2024. Butcher by Joyce Carol Oates. LonesomeReader Blog. July 25, 2024. https://lonesomereader.com/blog/2024/7/25/butcher-by-joyce-carol-oates Accessed 14 March 2025.
- Merkin, Daphne. 2024. 'Butcher' Tells the (Mostly) True Story of a Very Bad Gynecologist. New York Times, May 21, 2024.https://www.nytimes.com/2024/05/21/books/review/butcher-joyce-carol-oates.html Accessed 17 April 2025.
- Oates, Joyce Carol. 2024. Butcher: A Novel. Alfred A. Knopf, New York. ISBN 978-0-593-53777-0
