= Raven's Wing =

Collection of short fiction

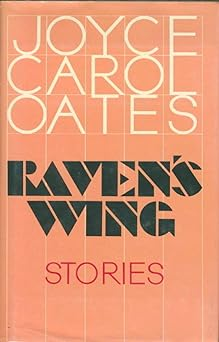
- First edition
- Author: Joyce Carol Oates
- Language: English
- Publisher: E. P. Dutton
- Publication date: 1986
- Publication place: United States
- Media type: Print (hardback & paperback)
- Pages: 305
- ISBN: 9780525244462

Raven's Wing is a collection of 18 short stories by Joyce Carol Oates, published by E. P. Dutton in 1986.

The title story "Raven's Wing" was included in The Best American Short Stories 1985. "The Seasons" was reprinted in Prize Stories 1985: The O. Henry Awards.

== Stories ==
Those stories first appearing in literary journals are indicated.

- "Raven's Wing" (Esquire, August 1984)
- "The Seasons" (Ploughshares, Winter 1983–84)
- "Nairobi" (Paris Review, Spring 1983)
- "Golden Gloves" (The Washington Post Magazine, August 4, 1985)
- "Harrow Street in Linden" (Massachusetts Review, Winter 1983)
- "Happy" (Vanity Fair, December 1984)
- "Ancient Airs, Voices" (The Antioch Review, Winter 1986)
- "Double Solitaire" (Michigan Quarterly Review, Spring 1986)
- "Manslaughter" (The Malahat Review, June 1984)
- "Little Wife" (Kenyon Review, Spring 1986)
- "The Jesuit" (The Missouri Review, Winter 1985–86)
- "The Mother" (Shenandoah, 1985–86)
- "Testimony" (Southern Review, Summer 1986)
- "Nuclear Holocaust" (New Directions 50, 1986)
- "Surf City" (Partisan Review, Summer 1986)
- "Little Blood-Button" (New Directions 50, 1986)
- "Baby" (The Ontario Review, Fall–Winter 1985–86)
- "April"

== Reception ==
Critic Greg Johnson considers the stories in Raven's Wing—in which Oates returns to settings and themes similar to the fictional "Eden County" she created in her volume By the North Gate (1963)—to exemplify "her most impressive recent work."

Literary critic Jack Matthews in The New York Times praises "the rich inventiveness conveyed in a plain style" in which the characters in the work take precedent over the author. Rejecting "fashionable ironies" Oates presents the tales of the working-class of semi-rural New York state in which "pent-up wrath of those who are inarticulate and self-deluded. And yet, in spite of their human defects, they are created with an urgency that signifies that they matter; and because of this urgency, they matter to the reader as well."

== Sources ==
- Johnson, Greg. 1994. Joyce Carol Oates: A Study of the Short Fiction. Twayne's studies in short fiction; no. 57. Twayne Publishers, New York. ISBN 0-8057-0857-X\.y
- Lercangee, Francine. 1986. Joyce Carol Oates: An Annotated Bibliography. Garland Publishing, Inc. New York & London. ISBN 0-8240-8908-1
- Matthews, Jack. 1986. "108 Days of Marriage, and Counting." The New York Times, October 5, 1986. https://archive.nytimes.com/www.nytimes.com/books/98/07/05/specials/oates-wings.html
- Oates, Joyce Carol. 1986. Raven's Wing. E. P. Dutton, New York. ISBN 978-0525244462
