= Sexy (novel) =

Novel by Joyce Carol Oates

- First edition
- Author: Joyce Carol Oates
- Language: English
- Publisher: HarperCollins
- Publication date: February 15, 2005
- Publication place: USA
- Media type: Print (Hardback & e-book)
- Pages: 272 pp
- ISBN: 0060541490

Sexy is a novel by Joyce Carol Oates. First published in 2005, it is her fourth book written for young adults. The book's themes of pederasty, homosexuality, and pre-marital sex as well as its adult language have caused it to be the source of attempts to ban the book from school libraries.

== Plot summary ==
Sexy follows the character of Darren Flynn, a sixteen-year-old high school student and swim club member that questions his own sense of self and sexuality. He's attractive but shy, gets average grades, and constantly worries about not meeting others' expectations.

On one rainy night after a training session, Darren's friend leaves early, leaving him without a ride. His teacher, Mr. Tracy, offers to drive him home. Darren is wary of the man, who's gay but in the closet, but he reluctantly gives in. Nothing really happens on the ride home, but Darren still leaves shaken up. Shortly after, Mr. Tracy catches one of Darren's swim team members plagiarizing, gives him a bad grade, and causes that member to be thrown off the team. This prompts that member to start a rumor as revenge, and several other students start to anonymously accuse the teacher of hitting on boys; it ruins the teacher's life. Darren does not participate in making accusations but is now torn between his moral objections and his fear of being thought of in the same light.

== Reception ==
Critical reception for Sexy has been positive, with Kirkus Reviews calling the book "a sympathetic portrait of a young man devoid of adult guidance". Bookpage and Teenreads both gave positive reviews, with Teenreads praising the book's themes. Publishers Weekly wrote: "Rather than delineating the lines between right and wrong, truth and falsehood, Oates uses the uncertain teen's viewpoint to mine the gray area, inviting readers to draw their own conclusions about the events."
