= Missing Mom =

2005 novel by Joyce Carol Oates

- Author: Joyce Carol Oates
- Language: English
- Publisher: Ecco Press
- Publication date: 2005
- Publication place: United States
- Pages: 434 pp
- ISBN: 978-0060816223

Missing Mom is a 2005 novel by American writer Joyce Carol Oates about the murder of a middle-aged widow.

== Plot ==
Nikki Eaton, a 31-year-old journalist in a small town in New York state, deals with the murder of her widowed mother, Gwen, by a meth addict, while having an affair with a married man and clashing with her more conventional older sister.

== Reception ==
Stacey D'Erasmo in The New York Times noted the themes of feminism and class politics in the novel and praised it as "more disturbing" than Oates's typical crime fiction. Kirkus Reviews was negative, calling the novel "irrationally bloated" and based on a "banal premise".
