= High Lonesome: New & Selected Stories, 1966–2006 =

2006 collection of short stories by Joyce Carol Oates

- Author: Joyce Carol Oates
- Genre: Short story collection
- Publisher: Ecco
- Publication date: April 11, 2006
- ISBN: 978-0-060-50119-8

High Lonesome: New and Selected Stories, 1966–2006 is a collection of short stories by American author Joyce Carol Oates. First published by Ecco in 2006, it is the author's largest collection of short stories.

The anthology included previously published stories, selected by Oates as her personal favorites, accompanied by eleven new short stories. The book is otherwise divided into the decades in which the stories were written. The 1960s section has six stories, the 1970s has five, the 1980s has seven and the 1990s, the final part of the collection, has seven short stories.

The compilation includes works from several earlier short story collections. A particular style of writing, the "miniature narratives" (one-or-two page 'scenes' which hint at a greater story), along with most 'horror'-themed works, were excluded from this text as the author's end notes discuss.

Oates' collections of the miniature narratives include The Assignation and Where Is Here?

As of this publication, more recent short story collections by Oates had been 'horror'-themed. One of the caveats decided upon when creating the collection, also discussed in the author's notes, was "nothing still in print".
