= I Am No One You Know: Stories =

2004 short story collection by Joyce Carol Oates

First edition

I Am No One You Know: Stories is a short story collection by Joyce Carol Oates. It was published in 2004 by Ecco Press, an imprint of HarperCollins Publishers. There are 19 stories in this collection. While critics noted its unevenness and its dark, uncomfortable material, several individual stories won honours, including The Best American Mystery Stories and the O. Henry Awards.

== Contents ==
The stories include (in the order they appear in the book):

Part One

- Curly Red: A girl nicknamed "Curly Red" reveals a secret in her family that concerns a racist crime.
- In Hiding: A poet responds to a black man's letters of his own works.
- I'm Not Your Son, I Am No One You Know: A man and his brother visit their demented father in a nursing home.
- Aiding and Abetting
- Fugitive
- Me & Wolfie: A boy and his young mother travel around and the boy tells of their lives.
- The Girl with the Blackened Eye: A 15-year-old girl is forcibly abducted and held hostage for several days in the hands of a serial rapist and killer.

Part Two

- Cumberland Breakdown: After a fire kills their father, and their mother becomes reclusive, a girl and her brother go and find the house of the family who started the fire.
- Upholstery: A woman, travelling back to her hometown after she became an adult, reminisces on how she, as a girl, was attracted to an adult man who works in an upholstery shop, had a frightful evening that almost resulted in horrible havoc.
- Wolf's Head Lake
- Happiness
- Fire: A woman and her brother visit a neighborhood after their doctor/father was killed in a fire in his house.
- The Instructor: A woman, who takes up an evening teaching position in a college, encounters someone unusual.

Part Three

- The Skull: A Love Story
- The Deaths: An Elegy: After being separated for many years after their parents' deaths, a woman and her brother meet again and visit the site where their father allegedly hacked their mother to death. The end of the story hints one might kill the other, how history might just repeat itself.
- Jorie (& Jamie): A Desposition: In a dysfunctional family, a girl tells the story of how her manipulative twin slyly hurts her and her brother.
- Mrs. Halifax and Rickie Swann: A Ballad: When a teacher sees a boy in her high school class, they begin an adulterous relationship.

Part Four

- Three Girls: Two girls, after seeing Marilyn Monroe shopping for books in a second-hand bookshop, decide to protect her by not revealing her presence.
- The Mutants: Although it is not directly said in the story, it is presumed that the story is about the 9/11 attacks. A young woman, after experiencing the attack from faraway, ran up to her apartment, and became something else, stronger.

== Critical reception ==
- "The Girl with the Blackened Eye" was selected for The Best American Mystery Stories 2001.
- "The Skull" was selected for Best American Mystery Stories, 2003.
- "Three Girls" was a National Magazine Awards 2003 finalist and also won a Pushcart Prize, XXVIII.
- "Curly Red" was a National Magazine Awards 2002 finalist.
- "The Instructor" won a Pushcart Prize, XXVII.
- "The Girl with the Blackened Eye" won an O. Henry Award, 2001.

Writing in the New York Times Book Review, John Schwartz noted that the collection depicted "deeply uncomfortable things" and that it could be uneven, but praised its sharpness: "These are small, hard gems, full of the same rich emotion and startling observation that readers of Oates' fiction have come to expect."

Publishers Weekly called the collection "sure-footed", and said: "In Oates's precise psychological renderings, victims are as complex as villains and almost always more interesting."

Kirkus Reviews called it "the usual disjointed gathering of carefully composed and inexplicably slipshod work: 19 stories, of varying length and intensity, most of which present overfamiliar Oates character types", but praised 3 stories for striking deeper, describing "Happiness" as "splendidly ironic".

Booklist said "Her new searing short stories explore the malevolent aspects of human sexuality with unflinching authenticity and a cathartic fascination."

Library Journal said "Oates demonstrates her continued ability to create edgy stories that are still grounded in reality. She immerses the reader in disturbing dilemmas and then resolves them in unexpected ways."
