= A Fair Maiden =

2010 novella by Joyce Carol Oates

- First edition (publ. Houghton Mifflin)
- Author: Joyce Carol Oates
- Language: English
- Publication date: 2010

A Fair Maiden is a 2010 novella by Joyce Carol Oates that chronicles the relationship between teenage nanny Katya Spivak and the much older, affluent artist Marcus Kidder. The novel's themes and plot are reminiscent of Vladimir Nabokov's Lolita.

== Plot ==
While walking her employers' two children, sixteen year-old nanny Katya Spivak is approached by an old man, Marcus Kidder, who seems to take an interest in her. Mr. Kidder invites Katya to his house, and though the initial visits seem harmless, their relationship gradually develops into something of a darker nature.

== Reception ==
Reviewing the book for The Washington Post, Jane Smiley compared Oates' prolific production to a large museum, and described this book as "a work that is not going to get a room of its own, or even a wall of its own, but it will fit neatly into the portrait gallery, and it deserves contemplation." Some other reviews were less positive. Publishers Weekly called the book "derivative and unpolished". Elizabeth Day in The Guardian said the book was a "disappointment" and that Oates had not succeeded in her effort to rework the themes of Lolita. Wendy Brandmark of The Independent noted some "fine moments" in the book but thought it was "too controlled".
