= We Were the Mulvaneys =

1996 novel by Joyce Carol Oates

- First edition
- Author: Joyce Carol Oates
- Language: English
- Publisher: Dutton (HB) & G. P. Putnam's Sons (PB)
- Publication date: 1996
- Publication place: United States
- Media type: Print (hardback and paperback)
- Pages: 454 pp
- ISBN: 0-525-94223-8
- OCLC: 34590958
- Dewey Decimal: 813/.54 20
- LC Class: PS3565.A8 W4 1996

We Were the Mulvaneys is a novel written by Joyce Carol Oates, and was published in 1996. We Were the Mulvaneys was featured in Oprah's Book Club in January 2001.

The novel chronicles the Mulvaneys, a seemingly perfect family living in the small, rural town of Mt. Ephraim, New York, during the latter part of the 20th century. The Mulvaneys own a successful roofing business, and are obsessed with social status. However, an incident that is hushed up in town and never spoken of again shatters the family fabric and has tragic consequences.

== Plot summary ==
Michael and Corinne Mulvaney are the parents of four children: Michael Jr., Patrick, Marianne, and Judd. Living in a farm in upstate New York, the Mulvaneys own a roofing company; Michael Mulvaney is considered a businessman. Corinne's life revolves around the family unit. For nearly twenty years the Mulvaney clan thrives, admired throughout the small town of Mt. Ephraim for being a model family.

On St. Valentine's night 1976, after prom, Marianne Mulvaney goes to a party where she becomes intoxicated and is raped by an upperclassman, whose father is a well-respected businessman and friend of Mr. Mulvaney.

Marianne's rape is the beginning of a tumultuous fifteen-year period. Her father, lost and angry, does not understand why his daughter will not press charges against her attacker. He can no longer look at his daughter the same way and sends her to live with a distant relative of Corinne's in Salamanca, New York. Marianne, moving haphazardly from place to place, continues to wait for her father to call on her, but he never does.

Michael Mulvaney Sr.'s casual drinking turns into full-fledged alcoholism. Gradually, his reputation as a respected businessman disintegrates. The Mulvaneys are forced into bankruptcy and must sell the farm. Eventually, Corinne and Michael split up. For the other family members, things continue to get worse. All three of the Mulvaney boys leave home angrily, never to return. One of them "executes justice" on his sister's rapist.

After many years, the Mulvaneys meet once again at a family reunion in Corinne's new home, which she shares with a friend. The family has extended to include spouses and children. Finally, the Mulvaneys come full circle and receive closure.

== Film adaptation ==
The book was made into a Lifetime Television movie, also titled We Were the Mulvaneys, in 2002 starring Beau Bridges (Michael Sr.), Blythe Danner (Corinne), Tammy Blanchard (Marianne), Jacob Pitts (Patrick), Thomas Guiry (Judd), and Mark Famiglietti (Michael Jr.). The film was nominated for three Emmys.
