= Boulevard (magazine) =

Literary magazine

- Editor: Jessica Rogen
- Categories: Literary magazine
- Frequency: Biannual
- Founded: 1984
- First issue: January 2, 1986
- Country: United States
- Based in: St. Louis
- Language: English
- Website: www.boulevardmagazine.org
- ISSN: 0885-9337
- OCLC: 61313363

Boulevard is a biannual, non-profit literary magazine based in St. Louis, Missouri. The magazine has published fiction, poetry and essays since its first issue came out in 1986.

According to managing editor Griffin Reed, the magazine is "more literary than most experimental magazines and more experimental than most mags that are purely literary." She also said their "tastes skew toward the surreal."

Authors published in the magazine include Joyce Carol Oates, Jonathan Baumbach, David Lehman, Albert Goldbarth, David R. Slavitt, Stephen Dixon, and Elain Terranova.

Poet Carl Philips said, “Boulevard has been especially attentive to a range of aesthetics, so there’s that kind of diversity, and then also racial diversity.” In a 2003 interview, editor-in-chief Richard Burgin said, "My suspicion, especially of many MFA writers, is that they are writing what they think will get published and are not sufficiently interested in exploring the form. [...] In Boulevard's slush pile, I find very little experimentation in form and structure. The stuff is tame. I see very little experimentation in point of view, in language. The subject matter is generally politically correct. Political correctness is the most noxious disease and enemy of the literary artist of our current time." Poet Laureate Daniel Hoffman called the magazine "one of the half-dozen best literary journals." Poet Charles Simic called it one of the eight best literary magazines in America.

== History ==
The magazine was established in New York City in 1984 by Richard Burgin, who served as editor-in-chief through 2015. The first issue was published in 1986 and featured work by Isaac Bashevis Singer and Kenneth Koch. In 1989 the magazine moved to Philadelphia. Between 1991-1995, it was published by Drexel University, where Richard Burgin taught. In the fall of 1996, Burgin moved to St. Louis and St. Louis University became its publisher, until the magazine became independent in 2013.

Jessica Rogen has served as the magazine's editor-in-chief since 2016.

== Honors and awards ==
The magazine has won city, state, and national grants and awards. Many poems, stories and essays are reprinted in anthologies such as The Best American Poetry series, The Best American Short Stories, The Pushcart Prize, The PEN/O. Henry Prize Stories, and The Best American Essays.
