= Mysterious Press =

American publishing company specializing in mystery fiction

- Parent company: Penzler Publishers (print); Open Road Integrated Media (ebook)
- Founded: 1975
- Founder: Otto Penzler
- Country of origin: United States
- Headquarters location: New York City
- Distribution: W.W. Norton
- Publication types: Books
- Fiction genres: mystery
- Official website: penzlerpublishers.com/product-category/mysterious-press/

The Mysterious Press is an American publishing company specializing in mystery fiction based in New York City. The company has been associated with various publishing companies, most recently with Grove Atlantic, where it was an imprint from 2011 to 2019. As of January 1, 2020, it became an independent imprint as part of Penzler Publishers. The offices of the Mysterious Press are located within The Mysterious Bookshop.

== History ==
Mysterious Press was founded in 1975 by Otto Penzler, and was one of the first genre publishers to use materials such as acid-free paper, full-cloth bindings, and full-color dust jackets. Many of the books it published were done in both trade and limited editions. In 1989, the company was sold to Warner Books, which was bought by Hachette in 2005. Penzler re-acquired the Mysterious Press name in 2011 and it became an imprint at Grove/Atlantic, Inc., though without publication rights to any of the previous imprint's back titles. In 2020, Mysterious Press became fully independent as part of Penzler Publishers, distributed by W. W. Norton & Company. Mysterious Press has also partnered with Open Road Integrated Media since 2011 for ebooks.

In its earliest days, Mysterious Press published works by Cornell Woolrich, Ross Macdonald, and Isaac Asimov. It went on to publish Maxwell Grant, James Ellroy, Patricia Highsmith, Ruth Rendell, Donald E. Westlake, Kingsley Amis, and Eric Ambler, among others.
