= The Sacrifice (Oates novel) =

2015 novel by Joyce Carol Oates

- Author: Joyce Carol Oates
- Language: English
- Publisher: Ecco Press
- Publication date: 2015
- Publication place: United States
- Media type: Print (hardback & paperback)
- Pages: 309 pp
- ISBN: 978-0062332981
- OCLC: 945404090

The Sacrifice is a 2015 novel by the American writer Joyce Carol Oates. Set in blighted urban New Jersey in the 1980s, it follows a young Black woman, Sybilla, who is discovered in a degraded condition in an abandoned factory after going missing. When she alleges that she was kidnapped, assaulted, and left for dead by a group of white police officers, her cause is taken up by an ambitious and unscrupulous civil rights activist and his lawyer brother, despite evidence of deceit in her story. The events of the novel are based on the real-life Tawana Brawley rape hoax, and takes place in a part of New Jersey still suffering from the aftermath of post-war deindustrialization and the 1967 Newark riots.

Following some of Oates's previous work, the novel explores themes of race, police violence, exploitation, and how individuals can be turned into symbols. Oates views the novel as "strongly linked" to her 1969 novel Them. It received a polarized critical reception: some reviews praised its treatment of the theme of racial inequality, while others felt it lacked nuance and empathy.

== Plot ==
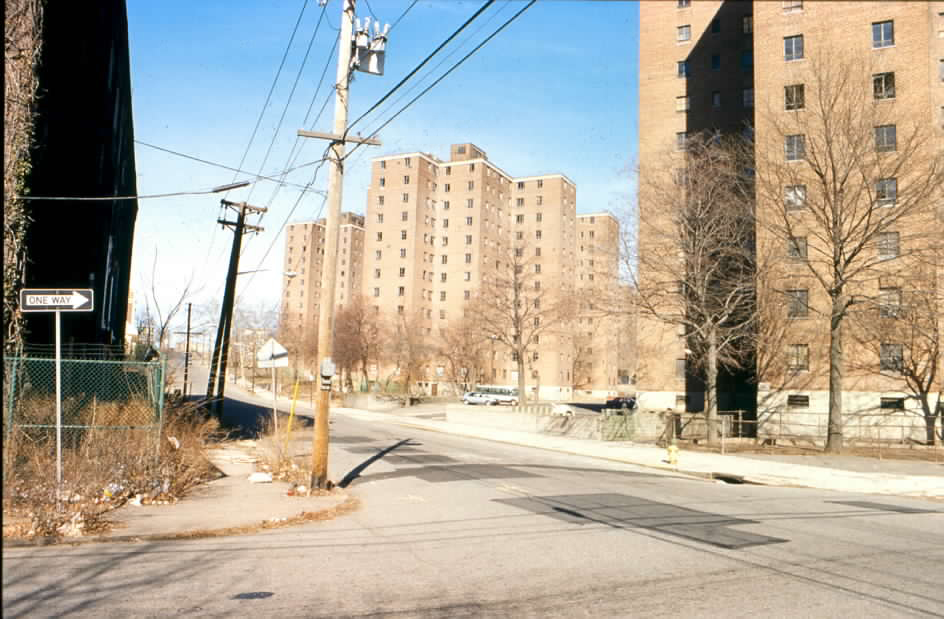
Semi-abandoned buildings in Newark in the mid-1990s. The Sacrifice takes place in a similar setting.

On October 7, 1987, in Pascayne, New Jersey, a badly beaten young Black woman is discovered in the cellar of an abandoned factory. She is partially naked and caked in dried blood with feces smeared in her hair and racial slurs written on her body in marker. The ambulance crew notes a few details that they find odd: she seems to be pretending to be unconscious, and the words written on her body are upside-down.

At the hospital, she is identified as Sybilla Frye, a 15-year-old girl who has been missing for the past several days. Sybilla's mother, Ednetta, arrives at the hospital and demands that they release Sybilla into her custody. She refuses to allow a rape kit to be administered to Sybilla, but consents to a police interview on the condition that the police officer be a Black woman.

Sybilla tells the assigned officer, a young Puerto Rican woman named Ines Iglesias, that she was abducted, raped, and left for dead by a group of five or six white police officers. As Sybilla is largely uncommunicative and Ednetta is hostile to Iglesias, the interview ends quickly, and Ednetta insists on taking Sybilla home.

Ednetta takes Sybilla to Sybilla's grandmother's house to hide and refuses to tell the police where she is. She tries to conceal the attack from Anis Schutt, her common-law husband who has harbored a deep hatred of the police since they killed his brother, and she rebuffs the entreaties of neighbors and civil rights lawyers to pursue the case against the police.

A month after Sybilla was discovered, word of the alleged attack reaches the ears of Marus Mudrick, a Black preacher and prominent civil rights activist. Mudrick spots an opportunity to capitalize on the crime, and reaches out to Ednetta and Sybilla offering to represent them and publicize their case. Ednetta and her daughter are hesitant, but eventually given in to Mudrick's charm.

Mudrick quickly drums up outrage over the attack and the inaction of the Pascayne police, with the hesitant support of his twin brother Byron, a respectable lawyer with a milder temperament who somewhat resents Marus's success. A rally that Mudrick convenes in Pascayne turns violent when he urges them to march on the city hall. In the ensuing chaos, Iglesias, who is attending the rally off-duty, is injured, loses her service weapon, and is subsequently reassigned to a different division as punishment.

In December, rookie police officer Jerold "Jere" Zahn kills himself after finding out that he has been let go from the force. Seizing on the news, Mudrick compels Sybilla to identify Zahn as one of her rapists. When the district attorney challenges the accusation, Mudrick accuses him of participating in the rape, too. Meanwhile, Mudrick has increasingly taken control of Ednetta and Sybilla's lives, moving them from their home and even confiscating a Rolex watch that Mike Tyson gave as a gift to Sybilla. At the height of the crusade, Mudrick is stabbed and nearly killed by an agent of one of his rivals, the militant leader of the Kingdom of Islam known as the Black Prince.

A few months later, Sybilla has joined the Kingdom of Islam and the Black Prince has taken up her cause. In a series of flashbacks, it is implied that Sybilla and Ednetta concocted the story of the gang rape after Anis beat Sybilla brutally. At a rally for Sybilla organized by the Black Prince in Pascayne, Anis is stopped by the police. After hesitating, Anis shoots two of them and is instantly killed by a barrage of return fire.

== Background ==
=== Joyce Carol Oates ===
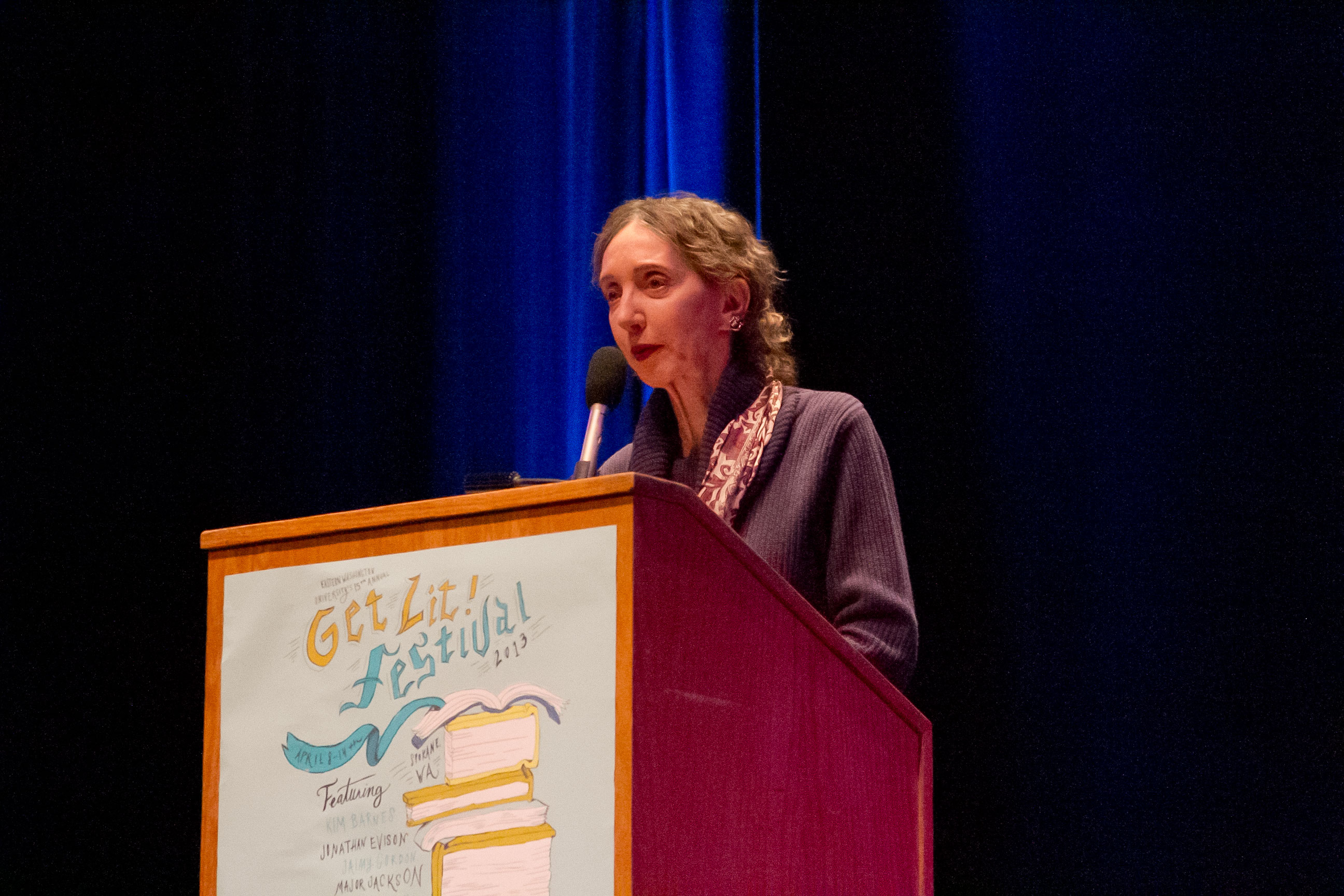
Oates in 2013

Joyce Carol Oates is an American writer. Described as "America's foremost woman of letters" and known for her prolific output, she had written more than 40 novels before The Sacrifice, some of which had dealt with issues of racism and misogyny. In the afterword to The Sacrifice, Oates states that the novel is "strongly linked" to her 1969 novel them, which ends with the 1967 Detroit riots.

Several of her previous books were based on real-life events, notably Blonde, about Marilyn Monroe, and Black Water, a roman à clef that parallels the Chappaquiddick incident. According to Alan Cheuse, The Sacrifice was published in the midst of a "national trauma on police and unarmed victims", and a subsequent novel by Oates, Night. Sleep. Death. The Stars., would also address racism and police violence. Greg Johnson, who wrote a biography of Oates, notes that she is willing to take on themes of race more directly than most other white authors.

=== Tawana Brawley ===
On November 28, 1987, Tawana Brawley, a 15-year Black girl who had been missing for four days, was found, alive, in a plastic garbage bag outside an apartment where she had lived in Wappingers Falls in the U.S. state of New York. Dazed and mostly unresponsive, she was smeared with feces and several racial slurs had been written on her body. In police interviews, Brawley indicated that she had been kidnapped by a group of white men, including one who appeared to be a police officer.

Brawley's case was taken up and brought to national attention by civil rights activist Al Sharpton, and assisted by lawyers Alton H. Maddox and C. Vernon Mason, who alleged a large-scale cover-up. A grand jury later concluded that Brawley fabricated her story. Brawley continued to maintain that she was telling the truth. The plot of the novel closely follows the Brawley case.

=== Setting ===
The novel is set in the fictional town of Pascayne, based on Passaic, in northern New Jersey in the 1980s. After World War II, New Jersey cities were hit hard by deindustrialization, while at the same time the Black population of cities like Newark, a major city close to the novel's fictional setting, increased significantly. In July 1967, Newark had five days of rioting after the beating of a Black cab driver by white police officers; over the course of the "most devastating riots in the history of New Jersey" twenty-six people were killed and millions of dollars of property was destroyed.

The riots – referenced in the novel – left a legacy of distrust between the city's Black population and the mostly-white police force. The riots also hastened white flight from Newark. In their aftermath, rising crime and urban blight contributed to Newark's status as "a symbol of America's decaying cities".

== Themes ==
According to Roxane Gay, the novel's title refers to the fact that "nearly all of the characters sacrifice something – faith, hope, dignity, truth, justice." More literally, Alan Cheuse points out that the detective Ines Iglesias wonders if she is going to be made a "'sacrifice' to public opinion", and at one point Marus tells Sybilla that she is "a race victim, a martyr, and a sacrifice". A central theme of the novel is how individual people and events are transformed into symbols and "are made to surrender their unique complexities as human beings", sometimes resulting in the obfuscation of facts in service of a larger purpose.

According to Kirkus Reviews, the novel raises the question of whether the truth or falsity of Sybilla's story makes "racism... any less true". In an academic review, Eric K. Anderson links The Sacrifice to Oates's earlier novel them and its "understanding of how specific incidents of racial conflict cannot be viewed only in isolation". Anderson also notes that the battle of wills between the Mudrick twins recalls similar dynamics between twins in previous novels by Oates.

Race plays an important role in The Sacrifice, not only in the conflict between white and non-white communities – exemplified by the police killing of Anis Schutt's brother as well as by Sybilla's case – but also in internal tensions within communities of color, such as Ednetta Frye's distrust of Iglesias, the Hispanic detective. Rose Tremain of The Guardian views the violence that breaks out during Mudrick's crusade as "mirroring an internal labyrinth of fear". A review in The Independent found that the novel depicts the "powerless of women" in a male world, and "simmers with barely concealed rage at the impotence inflicted on people by race and gender inequalities". Multiple reviewers noted the parallels between the novel and contemporary racial tensions in the United States.

== Reception ==
Writing in The New York Times, Roxane Gay offered measured praise for Oates's ambition but criticized the novel for its "lack of empathy" and "utter disregard for nuance", singling out inaccuracies in Oates's rendition of African-American Vernacular English. Kirkus Reviews found that the multiple perspectives employed by the novel failed to offer "nuance or fresh insights", and concluded that "Oates revives an old scandal without making it new."

Publishers Weekly similarly criticized the lack of nuance in its "heavy and overt focus on race", and described the narrative as "fragmented and often repetitive". A review of Oates's later novel Night. Sleep. Death. The Stars. noted that Oates's engagement with "the subjects of race, violence and socioeconomic status" has had only "intermittent success" and that The Sacrifice in particular was "marred by a lack of empathy and worse".

In a review for National Public Radio, Alan Cheuse was more positive, calling the novel a "raw and earnest work of fiction [that] offers a mix of fiery drama and the cold bone truths of race as we all live it today." Lesley McDowell's review in The Independent praised it as a "superb" synthesis of the themes of sexual violence and racial prejudice written in her "characteristic visceral and hypnotising style". The Washington Post's Jon Michaud and The Guardian's Rose Tremain found the Mudrick brothers particularly compelling.
