= 1981 New York City mayoral election =

- November 3, 1981
- Registered: 2,345,001
- Turnout: 1,305,368; 55.67% (▲4.19 pp)
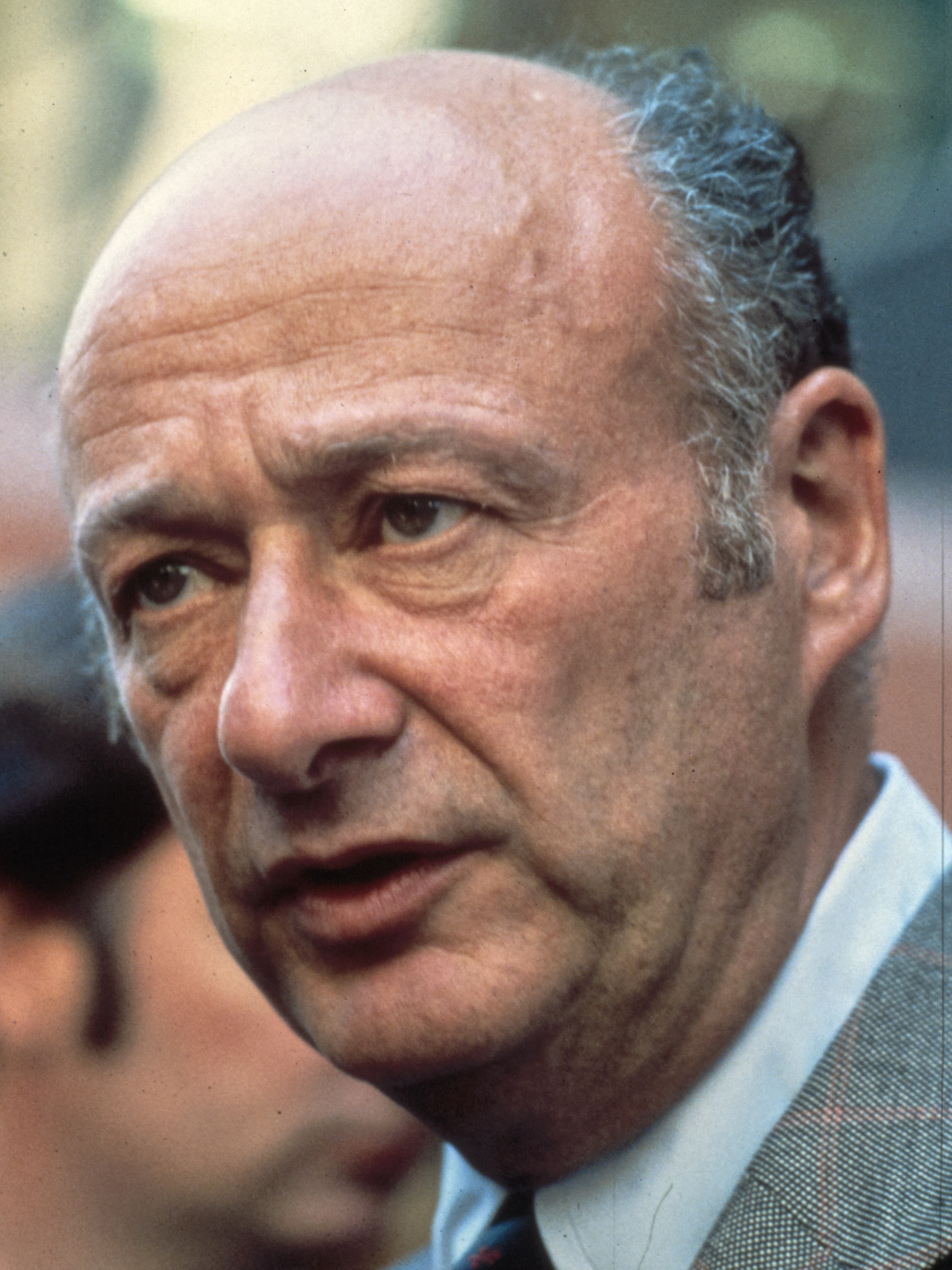

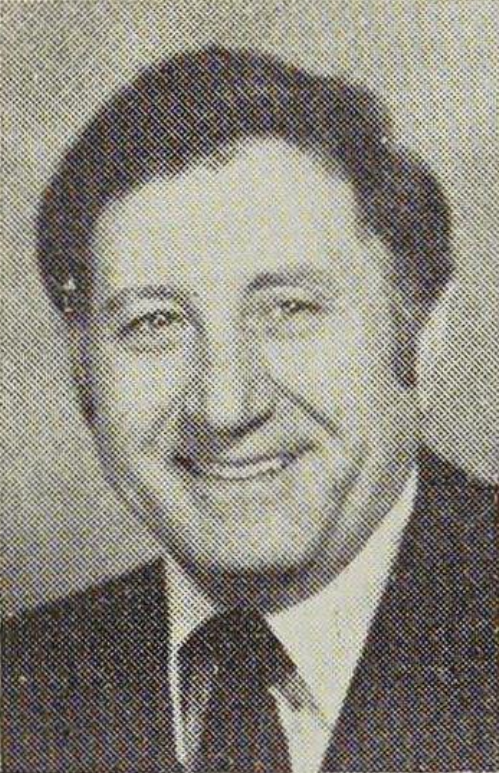
Candidate	Ed Koch	Frank J. Barbaro
Party	Democratic	Unity
Alliance	Republican
Popular vote	912,622	162,719
Percentage	74.6%	13.3%
- Borough results Koch: 60–70% 70–80%
Mayor before election
Ed Koch
Democratic
Elected Mayor
Ed Koch
Democratic

The 1981 New York City mayoral election occurred on Tuesday, November 3, 1981, with Democratic incumbent Mayor Ed Koch being re-elected to a second term by a landslide margin.

Koch won both the Democratic and Republican nominations and appeared on the ballot with both of their lines. He only faced opposition from third parties in the election.

Koch received an overwhelming 74.64% of the vote citywide. Koch also swept all five boroughs by landslide margins, breaking 60% of the vote in Manhattan and breaking 70% of the vote in Brooklyn, the Bronx, Queens and Staten Island. Koch's closest competitor was the short-lived New York Unity Party nominee Frank J. Barbaro, who received 13.31%. Finishing in a distant third and fourth were the Conservative Party nominee, John A. Esposito, who received 4.92%, and Liberal Party nominee, Mary T. Codd, who received 3.41%.

== Democratic primary ==
=== Candidates ===
- Frank J. Barbaro, Assemblyman from Bensonhurst
- Melvin Klenetsky, LaRouchite Activist
- Ed Koch, incumbent mayor

Koch won the Democratic Primary with 347,351 votes (59.8%), defeating Barbaro who had 209,369 votes (36.0%) and Melvin Klenetsky who had 24,352 votes (4.2%).

== Republican primary ==
=== Candidates ===
- John Esposito
- Ed Koch, incumbent Democratic mayor

Koch also won the Republican Primary, defeating Esposito by 44,724 to 22,354.

== General election ==
=== Candidates ===
- Frank J. Barbaro, Assemblyman from Bensonhurst (Unity)
- Mary Codd (Liberal)
- Jeronimo Dominguez, Roman Catholic activist, physician, and candidate for Bronx Borough President in 1979 (Right to Life)
- John Esposito (Conservative)
- Judith Jones (Libertarian)
- Ed Koch, incumbent Mayor (Democratic–Republican)
- Wells Todd (Socialist Workers)

=== Results ===
1981 New York City mayoral election
Party	Candidate	Votes	%	±%
Democratic	Ed Koch (incumbent)	738,288	60.38%	▲10.39
Republican	Ed Koch (incumbent)	174,334	14.26%	▲10.18
Total	Ed Koch (incumbent)	912,622	74.64%	▲24.65
Unity	Frank J. Barbaro	162,719	13.31%	N/A
Conservative	John Esposito	60,100	4.92%	▲0.92
Liberal	Mary Codd	41,718	3.41%	▼37.56
Right to Life	Jeronimo Dominguez	32,790	2.68%	N/A
Libertarian	Judith Jones	6,902	0.56%	▲0.49
Socialist Workers	Wells Todd	5,793	0.47%	▲0.24
Total votes		1,222,644	100.00%	

==== Results by borough ====
General Election
		Manhattan	The Bronx	Brooklyn	Queens	Staten Island	Total
Democratic – Republican	Edward I. Koch	189,631	132,421	261,292	275,812	53,466	912,622
Unity	Frank J. Barbaro	56,702	22,074	48,812	31,225	3,906	162,719
Conservative	John Esposito	6,682	7,634	15,388	26,515	3,881	60,100
Liberal	Mary Codd	14,228	5,902	7,958	8,795	4,835	41,718
							1,222,644
