= Howard Beach racial attack =

1986 racially motivated murder in Queens, New York, United States

- Location: Howard Beach, Queens, New York City, U.S.
- Date: December 20, 1986; 39 years ago
- Deaths: 1
- Injuries: 2
- Perpetrator: White mob
- Motive: Anti-black racism
- Convictions: Jon Lester, Scott Kern, Jason Ladone: Manslaughter

The Howard Beach racial attack was a racially-motivated attack on December 20, 1986, in which a 23-year-old black man, Michael Griffith, was killed in Howard Beach, in Queens, New York City. Griffith and two other black men were set upon by a group of white youths outside a pizza parlor. Two of the victims, including Griffith, were severely beaten. Griffith fled onto a highway where he was fatally struck by a passing motorist.

Three local teenagers, Jon Lester, Scott Kern, and Jason Ladone, were convicted of manslaughter for the death of Griffith. A fourth assailant, Michael Pirone, was acquitted. Griffith's death heightened racial tensions in New York City and was the second of three highly publicized, racially motivated killings of black men by white mobs in New York City in the 1980s. The other victims were Willie Turks in 1982 and Yusef Hawkins in 1989.

== Michael Griffith ==
Griffith was born on March 2, 1963. He immigrated to the United States from Trinidad and Tobago where his stepfather, Cedric Saniford from Guyana joined his family in 1973. He was a member of Our Lady of Charity Catholic Church in Crown Heights, Brooklyn.

== Attack ==
Late on the night of Friday, December 19, 1986, four black men, Michael Griffith, 23; Cedric Sandiford, 36; Curtis Sylvester and Timothy Grimes, both 20, were traveling from Brooklyn to Queens to pick up Griffith's paycheck, when their car, a 1976 Buick, broke down on a deserted stretch of Cross Bay Boulevard near the neighborhoods of Broad Channel and Far Rockaway. As Sylvester, the owner of the car, remained behind, the other three men walked about three miles north to the mostly white neighborhood of Howard Beach to find a pay phone.

After entering Howard Beach, the three men were accosted by a group of white residents, who yelled racial slurs and told them to leave the neighborhood. By 12:30 a.m., the men reached the New Park Pizzeria near the intersection of Cross Bay Boulevard and 157th Avenue. After a rest and a meal, the men left the pizzeria at 12:40 a.m. and were confronted by a larger group of white youths led by 17-year-old John Lester and 16-year-old Jason Ladone. The group were armed with tire irons, baseball bats, and tree limbs.

The group of white youths attacked Griffith and Sandiford outside the pizzeria, while Grimes escaped after brandishing a knife. The youths chased the men, and Sandiford and Griffith were seriously beaten. While fleeing the attack, Griffith ran onto the nearby Belt Parkway where he was struck and killed by a motorist. His body was found on the highway at 1:03 a.m.

When police found Sandiford walking west on the highway, they brought him to the site of Griffith's body and, without providing medical attention, searched him and placed him in a squad car before interrogating him for several hours. The next morning, police chief Benjamin Ward reprimanded the officers for their treatment of Sandiford. New York mayor Edward Koch compared the attack on the men to a lynching.

Black civil-rights activist Al Sharpton organized several protests in Howard Beach and nearby neighborhoods. Ministers Floyd Flake and Herbert Daughtry and activist Sonny Carson urged boycotts of white-owned businesses and pizzerias. During protests, mostly black marchers carried signs comparing the neighborhood to South Africa during apartheid, while white residents displayed signs reading "Niggers Go Home", "White Power", and "Bring Back Slavery".

== Investigation and trial ==
Griffith's death provoked strong outrage and immediate condemnation by mayor Edward Koch, who referred to the case as the "No. 1 case in the city". Two days after the event, on December 22, three local youths, Lester and Ladone, along with Scott Kern, 18; all students at John Adams High School, were arrested and charged with second-degree murder. The driver of the car that struck Griffith, 24-year-old Dominick Blum, was not charged with any crime.

The Griffith family, as well as Cedric Sandiford, retained the services of Alton H. Maddox and C. Vernon Mason, two attorneys who would become involved in the Tawana Brawley hoax the following year. Maddox raised the ire of the NYPD and Commissioner Benjamin Ward by accusing them of trying to cover up facts in the case and aid the defendants.

After witnesses repeatedly refused to cooperate with Queens district attorney John J. Santucci, then-governor Mario Cuomo appointed Charles Hynes as special prosecutor to handle the Griffith case on January 13, 1987. The move came after pressure from black leaders on Cuomo to dismiss Santucci, who was seen as too partial to the defendants to prosecute the case effectively.

Twelve defendants were indicted by a grand jury on February 9, 1987, including the original three charged in the case. Their original indictments had been dismissed after the witnesses refused to cooperate in the case. A little over a year after the death of Griffith, and after 12 days of jury deliberations, the three main defendants, Kern, Lester and Ladone, were convicted on December 21, 1987, of second-degree manslaughter and first-degree assault. Michael Pirone, 18, was acquitted.

Ultimately nine people would be convicted on a variety of charges related to Griffith's death. On January 22, 1988, Jon Lester was sentenced to ten to thirty years' imprisonment. On February 5, Scott Kern was sentenced to six to eighteen years' imprisonment, and on February 11, 1988, Jason Ladone received a sentence of five to fifteen years' imprisonment. The other defendants were convicted of lesser charges; most were sentenced to community service.

== Aftermath ==
Subsequent race-related crimes in New York city included the 1989 killing of black teenager Yusuf Hawkins in the Bensonhurst neighborhood of Brooklyn by a gang of white youths.

During the credits of the 1989 Spike Lee film Do the Right Thing Lee dedicated the film to the family of Michael Griffith and the families of five black people who were killed by police officers: Eleanor Bumpurs, Arthur Miller Jr., Edmund Perry, Yvonne Smallwood and Michael Stewart.

In 1999, six blocks of Pacific Street in Crown Heights, Brooklyn, where Griffith had lived as a child, were named in his honor, as "Michael Griffith Street".

Jason Ladone, then 29, was released from prison in April 2000 after serving 10 years and later became a city employee. He was arrested again in June 2006, on drug charges. In May 2001, Jon Lester was released and deported back to the United Kingdom where he studied electrical engineering and started his own business. He died on August 14, 2017, at age 48 in a suspected suicide. He left behind a wife and three children. Scott Kern was released from prison in 2002, the last of the three main perpetrators to be released.

In 2005, the Griffith case was brought back to the public's attention after another racial attack in Howard Beach. A black man, Glenn Moore, was beaten severely with a metal baseball bat by Nicholas Minucci. Minucci was convicted of hate crimes in 2006, and was sentenced to 15 years in prison. The case was revisited once more by the media after the killing of Michael Sandy, 29, who was beaten and hit by a motorist after being chased onto the Belt Parkway in Brooklyn, New York, in October 2006.
