= Marla Hanson =

American retired screenwriter and model (born 1961)

- Born: June 18, 1961 (age 65); Independence, Missouri
- Occupation: Model
- Years active: 1985–1986
- Agent: Wilhelmina Models
- Height: 1.63 m (5 ft 4 in)
- Spouse: Douglas Howell
- Children: 1
- Parents: Bob Hanson (father); Phyllis Louise Stephenson (mother)

Marla Hanson (born June 18, 1961) is an American former model who was the victim of a slashing attack in 1986, and a former screenwriter with credits on two films, both in 1997: The Blackout and the segment "Love on the A Train" of Subway Stories.

== Early life ==
Born in Independence, Missouri, Hanson graduated from Odessa High School in Odessa, Missouri, and attended college at Southwestern Assemblies of God University in Waxahachie, Texas, a suburb of Dallas. After working as a real estate and insurance saleswoman, a job promotion brought her to New York City, where she took a part-time modeling job that eventually became her full-time career in the 1980s.

== Career ==
Standing at 5 feet 4 inches, Hanson was shorter than the typical high-fashion model of the 1980s. Despite this, her striking features and hazel eyes helped her build a strong commercial portfolio. While managed by Petite Model Management, she successfully booked work with prominent national publications, including Glamour and Mademoiselle and finished her first TV commercial.

== Attack ==
In June 1986, Hanson became involved in a dispute with her landlord, Steve Roth, over a security deposit that he owed her. She had also previously rejected his romantic advances. Roth hired two friends, Steven Bowman and Darren Norman, to attack Hanson. Hanson testified that Roth asked her to step outside a bar, and then stood by while the two men, after announcing a "stick-up," slashed her face with a razor blade. The assault left three wounds that required surgery and over 100 stitches to close, resulting in permanent scars.

Roth and the two attackers were tried separately, with Judge Jeffrey Atlas presiding over both trials. In Roth's trial, a lawyer for Roth suggested that his breaking off of a long-term gay relationship with Bowman that day led Bowman to attack Hanson out of jealousy. In Roth's trial, he was found guilty of first degree assault for arranging the attack.

In the trial of Bowman and Norman a few months later, Hanson was subjected to a controversial cross examination by Bowman's defense attorney Alton H. Maddox, who impugned her character in a line of questioning the prosecutor called "disgusting and filthy". Maddox also asserted that Hanson had "racial hangups" that led her to falsely identify Bowman and Norman, who are black, as her attackers. Hanson and her attorney later publicly criticized the criminal justice system for allowing her to be humiliated on the witness stand. Bowman and Norman were found guilty.

At sentencing, Atlas gave Roth the 5- to 15-year maximum sentence, but not before telling a weeping Hanson and her attorney he was "incensed" at their public criticism of the criminal justice system. After a brief recess, Atlas apologized to Hanson and her lawyer. Mayor Ed Koch expressed outrage at Atlas' comments. Bowman and Norman were sentenced to the 5- to 15-year maximum sentence as well.

Hanson has since lobbied for reform in the way victims of crimes are treated in criminal courts.

== Screenwriter ==
Hanson has two screenwriter credits:

- The Blackout (1997)
- Subway Stories - segment "Love on the A Train" (1997)

== Personal life ==
In 1997, Hanson married Douglas Howell, whom she had met on a flight to Cuba a few months earlier. They have a daughter together.

== In popular culture ==
The story of the attack on Hanson was made into the 1991 TV movie The Marla Hanson Story, where she was portrayed by Cheryl Pollak.

Hanson was featured on the third episode of the 2020 Netflix reality series Skin Decision: Before and After. She received numerous treatments to improve her skin.
