= Ed Koch =

Mayor of New York City from 1978 to 1989

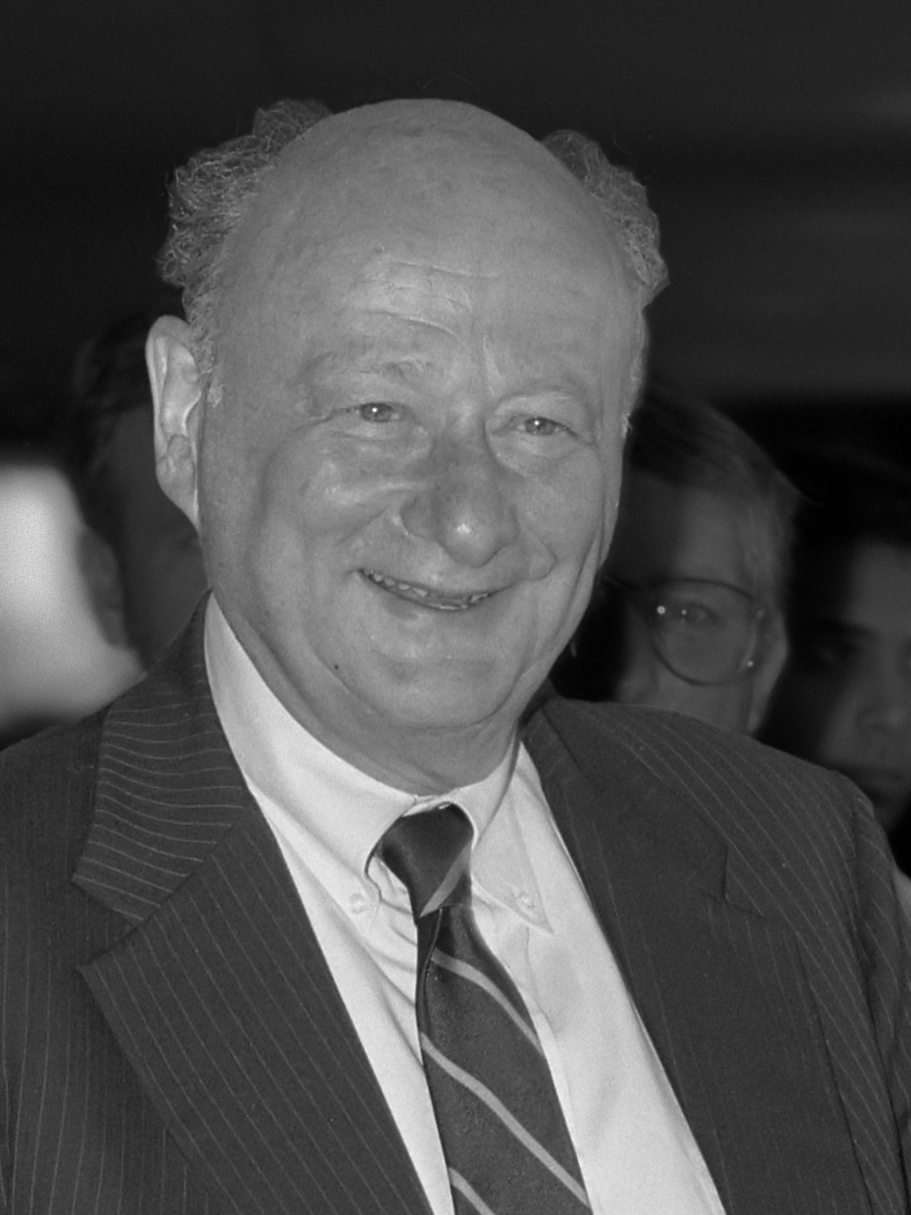
- Koch in 1988

106th Mayor of New York City
- In office January 1, 1978 – December 31, 1989
- Preceded by: Abraham Beame
- Succeeded by: David Dinkins

Member of the U.S. House of Representatives from New York
- In office January 3, 1969 – December 31, 1977
- Preceded by: Theodore Kupferman
- Succeeded by: Bill Green
- Constituency: 17th district (1969–1973); 18th district (1973–1977)

Member of the New York City Council from the 2nd district
- In office January 1, 1967 – January 3, 1969
- Preceded by: Woodward Kingman
- Succeeded by: Carol Greitzer

Personal details
- Born: Edward Irving Koch; December 12, 1924 New York City, U.S.
- Died: February 1, 2013 (aged 88) New York City, U.S.
- Party: Democratic
- Relations: Pat Koch Thaler (sister)
- Education: City College of New York (BA); New York University (LLB)

Military service
- Branch/service: United States Army
- Years of service: 1943–1946
- Rank: Sergeant
- Unit: 104th Infantry Division
- Battles/wars: World War II; Battle of Hürtgen Forest; Battle of the Bulge
- Awards: Combat Infantryman Badge; European-African-Middle Eastern Campaign Medal; World War II Victory Medal

Edward Irving Koch (/kɒtʃ/ KOTCH; December 12, 1924 – February 1, 2013) was an American politician who served in the United States House of Representatives from 1969 to 1977 and was mayor of New York City from 1978 to 1989. A popular figure, Koch rode the New York City Subway and stood at street corners greeting passersby with the slogan "How'm I doin'?"

Koch was a lifelong Democrat who described himself as a "liberal with sanity". The author of an ambitious public housing renewal program in his later years as mayor, he began by cutting spending and taxes and cutting 7,000 employees from the city payroll. He was the city's second Jewish mayor after his predecessor Abraham Beame. (Note: Some consider Fiorello LaGuardia to be New York City's first Jewish mayor since his mother was a non-practicing Jew, although LaGuardia himself practiced Episcopalianism.) He crossed party lines to endorse Rudy Giuliani for mayor of New York City in 1993, Al D'Amato for Senate in 1998, Michael Bloomberg for mayor of New York City in 2001, and George W. Bush for president in 2004.

Koch was first elected mayor of New York City in 1977 and was re-elected in 1981 with 75% of the vote. He was the first New York City mayor to win endorsement on both the Democratic and Republican party tickets. In 1985, Koch was elected to a third term with 78% of the vote. His third term was fraught with scandal regarding political associates (although the scandal never touched him personally) and with racial tensions, including the killings of Michael Griffith and Yusuf Hawkins. In a close race, Koch lost the 1989 Democratic primary to his successor, David Dinkins.

Koch was a lifelong bachelor. Though he publicly denied being gay on numerous occasions, he attempted to find a boyfriend late in life.

== Early life ==
Koch was born in the Crotona Park East section of the Bronx in New York City, the son of Yetta (or Joyce, née Silpe) and Louis (Leib) Koch, Polish-Jewish immigrants from Kozliv and Uścieczko (Ustechko) in Eastern Galicia, both located in Ternopil Oblast in western Ukraine. He came from a family of Conservative Jews who resided in Newark, New Jersey, where his father worked at a theater. As a child, he worked as a hatcheck boy in a Newark dance hall. He graduated from South Side High School in Newark in 1941.

== World War II ==
In 1943, Koch was drafted into the United States Army. Koch did his basic training at Camp Croft, South Carolina, in 1943 before entering the Army Specialized Training Program. He then joined the 104th Infantry Division. On 27 August 1944, he departed New York City, landing in Cherbourg, France, on 7 September 1944. He earned a European-African-Middle Eastern Campaign Medal with two campaign stars, a World War II Victory Medal, and the Combat Infantryman Badge for service in the European Theater of Operations. After V-E Day, because he could speak German, Koch was sent to Bavaria to aid in the de-Nazification of the civil service there. He was honorably discharged with the rank of sergeant in 1946.

== Post-World War II ==
Koch returned to New York City to attend City College of New York, graduating in 1945, and New York University School of Law, receiving his law degree in 1948. Koch was a sole practitioner from 1949 to 1964, and a partner with Koch, Lankenau, Schwartz & Kovner from 1965 to 1968. A Democrat, he became active in New York City politics as a reformer and opponent of Carmine DeSapio and Tammany Hall. In 1962 Koch ran for office for the first time, unsuccessfully opposing incumbent William Passannante, a DeSapio ally, for the Democratic nomination for the State Assembly.

In 1963, Koch defeated DeSapio for the position of Democratic Party leader for the district which included Greenwich Village, and Koch won again in a 1965 rematch. Koch served on the New York City Council from 1967 to 1969.

== Career ==
=== Elections ===
==== 1968 ====
Koch ran for Congress in New York's 17th congressional district after Republican Theodore Roosevelt Kupferman retired. He defeated Republican Whitney Seymour Jr. and Conservative Richard J. Callahan, who partly split the conservative vote. He won 48.5% of the vote to Seymour's 45.6% and Callahan's 5.9%.

==== 1970 ====
Koch was reelected with 62% of the vote, defeating Republican Peter J. Sprague and Conservative Callahan who finished with 32% and 6%, respectively.

==== 1972 ====
In advance of the 1972 elections, Koch was redistricted into the 18th district. He defeated Republican Jane Pickens Langley and Socialist Workers nominee Rebecca Finch, 70%–29%–1%.

==== 1973 ====
Koch briefly ran for mayor in 1973, but garnered little support and dropped out before the Democratic primary. Comptroller Abraham Beame won the election.

==== 1974 ====
Koch won reelection (with career-best 76.7% of the vote) to the 18th district against John Boogaerts Jr. (Republican, 18.8%), Gilliam M. Drummond (Conservative, 3.7%), and Katherine Sojourner (Socialist Workers, 0.8%).

==== 1976 ====
Koch was again reelected, this time with 75.7% of the vote, defeating Sonia Landau (Republican, 20.1%), and James W. McConnell (Conservative, 4.3%).

==== 1977 ====
Koch announced his campaign for mayor of New York City against incumbent Beame. Koch and future governor Mario Cuomo finished first (19.8%) and second (18.7%) in the Democratic primary, eliminating Beame (18%). In a runoff, Koch defeated Cuomo, 55%-45%. In the general election, Koch again defeated Cuomo, who ran on the Liberal Party ticket, 50% to 41%.

Koch ran to the right of the other candidates on a "law and order" platform. According to historian Jonathan Mahler, the New York City blackout of July 1977 and the subsequent rioting helped catapult Koch and his message of restoring public safety to front-runner status.

==== 1981 ====
Koch won both the Democratic and Republican nominations and appeared on the ballot with both of their lines. He faced opposition only from third parties. He won 74.6% of the vote, with Unity candidate Frank Barbaro netting next-best 13.3%. John A. Esposito (Conservative) and Mary T. Codd (Liberal) also ran. Koch swept all five boroughs by landslide margins, breaking 60% of the vote in Manhattan and 70% in Brooklyn, the Bronx, Queens and Staten Island.

==== 1982 ====
After incumbent Hugh Carey announced he would not run for reelection, Koch announced his candidacy for governor of New York. Cuomo, who had been elected lieutenant governor, also ran. Koch received the party's endorsement with 61% of the convention vote, but Cuomo won the Democratic primary. The New York Times called Cuomo's victory a "stunning upset" that relied on "an unusual coalition of liberal Democrats, labor, minorities and upstaters". Koch ran strongly in Jewish communities, while Cuomo won black, liberal, and Italian communities by a similar margin. A key to Cuomo's victory was his strong showing in New York City itself; though Koch won the city and its four suburban counties (Rockland, Westchester, Suffolk, and Nassau) as expected, Cuomo kept the margin close and won half of the city's Assembly districts. That, combined with large victories in nearly every upstate county, allowed Cuomo to win. Koch endorsed Cuomo immediately, declaring "what's important to all of us is that we keep a Democrat in Albany." During the campaign, posters cropped up which mocked Koch's sexuality which written "Vote Cuomo not the Homo" circulated. Many say the deciding factor in Koch's loss was an interview with Playboy magazine in which he critiqued the lifestyle of suburbia. Koch's remarks are thought to have alienated many voters from outside New York City. Cuomo was elected governor over Republican Lewis Lehrman, and served three terms.

==== 1985 ====
Koch was reelected to a third term in a landslide. He defeated Carol Bellamy (Liberal) and Dian McGrath (Republican/Conservative), 78%-10%-9%, respectively, and was sworn into his third and final term in January 1986. As of 2021, this is the most recent mayoral election in which a Democrat carried Staten Island. During the campaign, Koch visited the Lubavitcher Rabbi Menachem Mendel Schneerson, seeking his blessing and endorsement.

==== 1989 ====
Koch ran for an unprecedented fourth term in 1989. No mayor had ever won a fourth term, though Fiorello La Guardia and Robert Wagner also served three terms, and Wagner attempted to run for a fourth in 1969. Koch lost the Democratic primary to Manhattan Borough President David Dinkins, who finished with 547,901 votes to Koch's 456,313. Dinkins was helped in part by large margins in Manhattan, the Bronx, and Brooklyn, while Koch carried Staten Island and Queens. Dinkins defeated Rudy Giuliani in the general election by a narrow margin, with Giuliani carrying both counties Koch won in the primary. Giuliani won a rematch against Dinkins in 1993.

=== U.S. congressional tenure ===
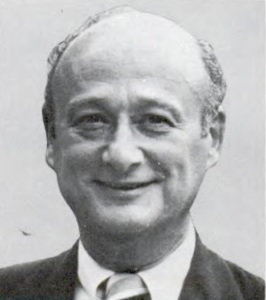
Koch served in the United States House of Representatives from 1969 to 1977.

Koch was the Democratic U.S. Representative from New York's 17th congressional district from January 3, 1969, until January 3, 1973, when, after a redistricting, he represented New York's 18th congressional district until December 31, 1977, when he resigned to become Mayor of New York City.

Koch said he began his political career as "just a plain liberal", with positions including opposing the Vietnam War and marching in the South for civil rights. In April 1973, Koch coined the term "Watergate Seven" when, in response to U.S. Senator Lowell P. Weicker Jr.'s indicating that one of the men in Watergate scandal had been ordered in the spring of 1972 to keep certain senators and representatives under surveillance, he posted a sign on his office door reading, "These premises were surveilled by the Watergate Seven. Watch yourself". At about the same time, Koch began his rightward shift toward being a "liberal with sanity" after reviewing the 1973 controversy around then-New York City Mayor John Lindsay's attempt to place a 3,000-person housing project in a middle-class community in Forest Hills, Queens. Koch met with residents of the community, most of whom were against the proposal. He was convinced by their arguments, and spoke out against the plan, shocking some of his liberal allies.

Koch was active in advocating for a greater U.S. role in advancing human rights within the context of fighting Communism. He had particular influence in the foreign aid budget, as he sat on the House Appropriations Subcommittee on Foreign Operations. In 1976, Koch proposed that the U.S. cut off military aid and supplies to the military dictatorship of Uruguay. In mid-July 1976, the CIA learned that two high-level Uruguayan intelligence officers had discussed a possible assassination attempt on Koch by Dirección de Inteligencia Nacional (DINA), the Chilean secret police under dictator Augusto Pinochet. The CIA did not regard these threats as credible until after the September 1976 assassination of Orlando Letelier in Washington, D.C., by DINA agents coordinated by Operation Condor. After that, Director of Central Intelligence George H. W. Bush informed Koch of the threat. Koch subsequently asked both the CIA and the FBI for protection, but none was extended.

=== Tenure as mayor of New York City ===
Koch with city council members in 1980.

==== First term ====
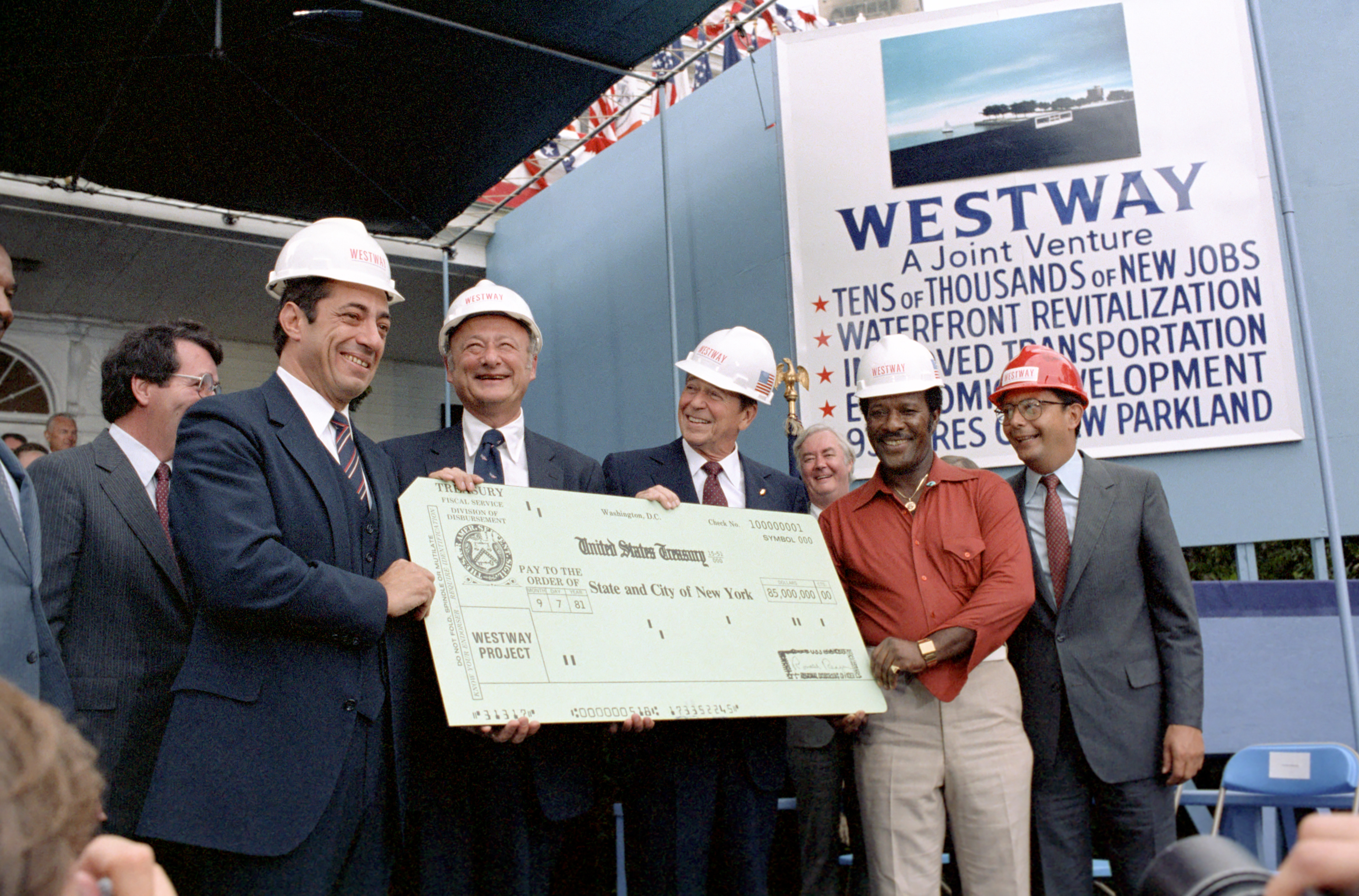
President Ronald Reagan presenting Ed Koch and other New York leaders, including Governor Mario Cuomo, with a check for Westway Project Funds, September 1981

When Koch entered office the city was facing multiple serious issues. The city was in financial crisis, crime rates were soaring, and the city was still recovering from a major blackout and looting. Koch instituted austerity measures which put the city on better financial foundations for his second term.

During his first term as mayor, which many consider his best, a number of major events occurred in New York City. John Lennon's abrupt assassination sent shock waves around the world. Grief-stricken New Yorkers walked the streets openly crying for days after the shooting, which took place in front of The Dakota, Lennon's place of residence on Manhattan's Upper West Side. Koch also dealt with the second transit strike, and pushed for the 1980 Democratic National Convention to be in NYC. His first term also saw a sister city relationship begin with Beijing.

==== Second term ====
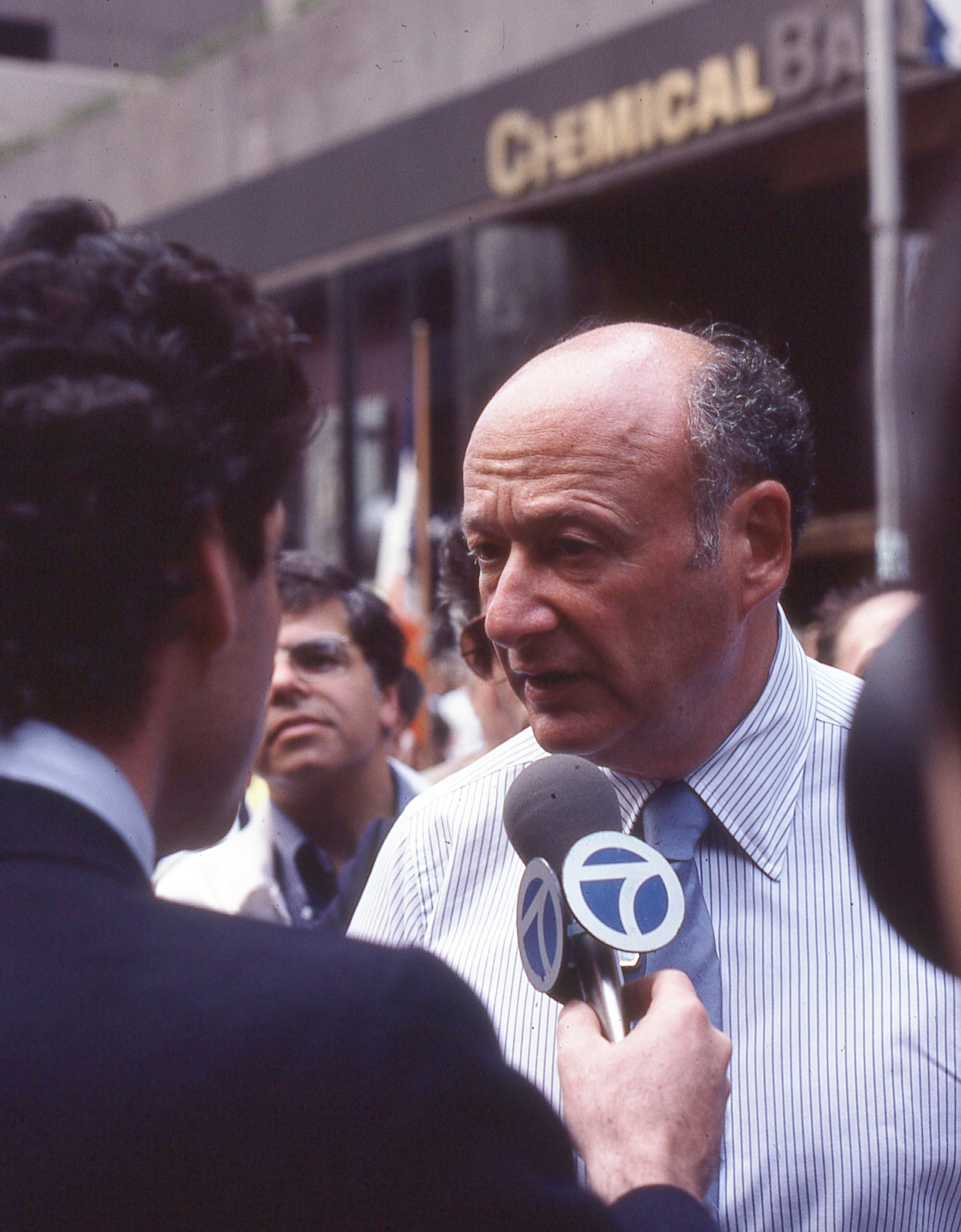
Koch giving interview to WABC-TV in 1981

Among the events of Koch's second term as mayor were the Brooklyn Bridge's 100th anniversary, the appointing of Benjamin Ward as the city's first ever African American police commissioner in 1983, the emergence of AIDS as a public health crisis, extensive media coverage of Bernhard Goetz's shooting of four African American teenagers in the subway in 1984, and the United Nations' 40th anniversary.

Koch often deviated from the conventional liberal line, strongly supporting the death penalty, adding 3,500 officers to the NYPD in the 1980s, and taking a hard line on "quality of life" issues, such as giving police broader powers in dealing with the homeless and signing legislation banning the playing of radios on subways and buses. These positions prompted harsh criticism from the local chapter of the American Civil Liberties Union and many African-American leaders, particularly Reverend Al Sharpton.

In 1984, Koch published his first memoir, Mayor, which became a best-seller and was adapted into an off-Broadway and later Broadway musical, Mayor.

==== Third term ====
In 1986, Koch signed a lesbian and gay rights ordinance for the city after the City Council passed the measure (on March 20), after 15 years of failed attempts by that body to approve such legislation. Despite his overall pro-lesbian and pro-gay-rights stance, he nonetheless backed up the New York City Health Department's decision to shut down the city's gay bathhouses in 1985 in response to concerns over the spread of AIDS. The enactment of the measure the next year placed the city in a dilemma, as it apparently meant that the bathhouses would have to be reopened because many heterosexual "sex clubs" – such as Plato's Retreat – were in operation in the city at the time, and allowing them to remain open while keeping the bathhouses shuttered would have been a violation of the newly adopted anti-discrimination law. The Health Department, with Koch's approval, reacted by ordering the heterosexual clubs, including Plato's Retreat, to close as well. Also in 1986, Koch participated in Hands Across America and in the Statue of Liberty's 100th anniversary celebration. Koch's third term was also marked by the career-ending face-slashing of model Marla Hanson, the paralyzing shooting of NYCPD detective Steven McDonald, the crack cocaine epidemic and its related gangs, the Robert Chambers "preppie murder" case, the Howard Beach incident, and the racially motivated murder of Yusef Hawkins.

Koch consistently demonstrated a fierce love for New York City, which some observers felt he carried to extremes on occasion: in 1984, he went on record as opposing the creation of a second telephone area code for the city, claiming that this would divide the city's population; and when the National Football League's New York Giants won Super Bowl XXI in January 1987, he refused to grant a permit for the team to hold their traditional victory parade in the city, quipping famously, "If they want a parade, let them parade in front of the oil drums in Moonachie" (a town in New Jersey adjacent to the East Rutherford site of the Meadowlands Sports Complex, where the Giants play their home games).

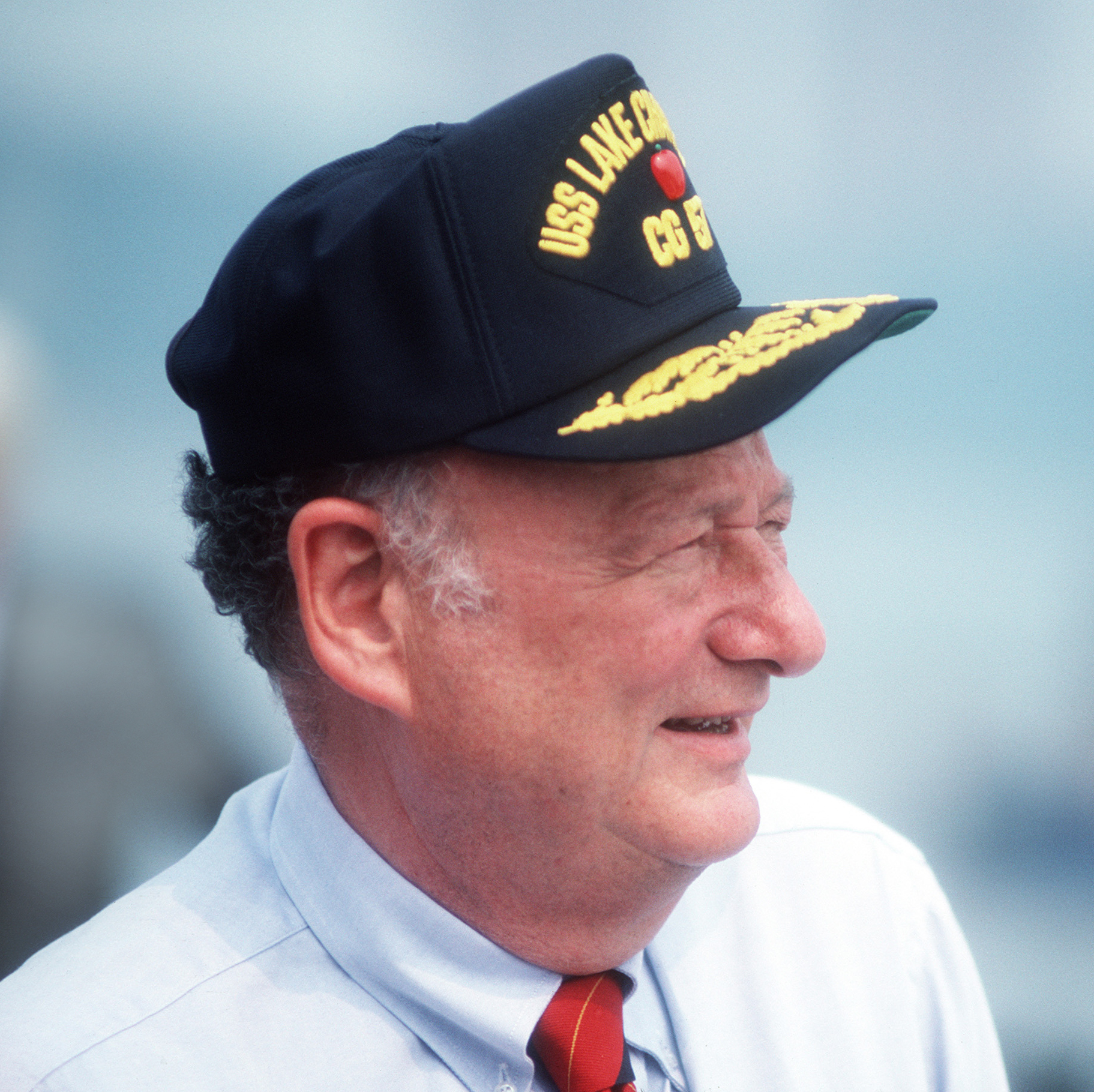
Edward Koch at the commissioning of USS Lake Champlain (1988)

In his third term, Koch's popularity was shaken after a series of corruption scandals, touched off by Donald Manes's suicide and the Parking Violations Bureau scandal, which revealed that he had acceded to the requests of political allies (most notably Queens Borough President Manes, Bronx Democratic Party official Stanley M. Friedman and Brooklyn Democratic Party chairman Meade Esposito, an American Mafia associate long perceived as New York City's preeminent political leader) to stack city agencies with patronage appointments. There were no allegations that Koch obtained any financial benefit from the corruption, but the scandals undermined Koch's claims that he ran a patronage-free municipal government. Michael Tager attributes the scandals not to Koch's failures but to the steadily declining power of the Democratic machine and its bosses' desperate efforts to reverse the collapse.

In July 1987, Koch proposed banning bicycling on Fifth, Park and Madison avenues during weekdays, but many bicyclists protested and had the ban overturned.

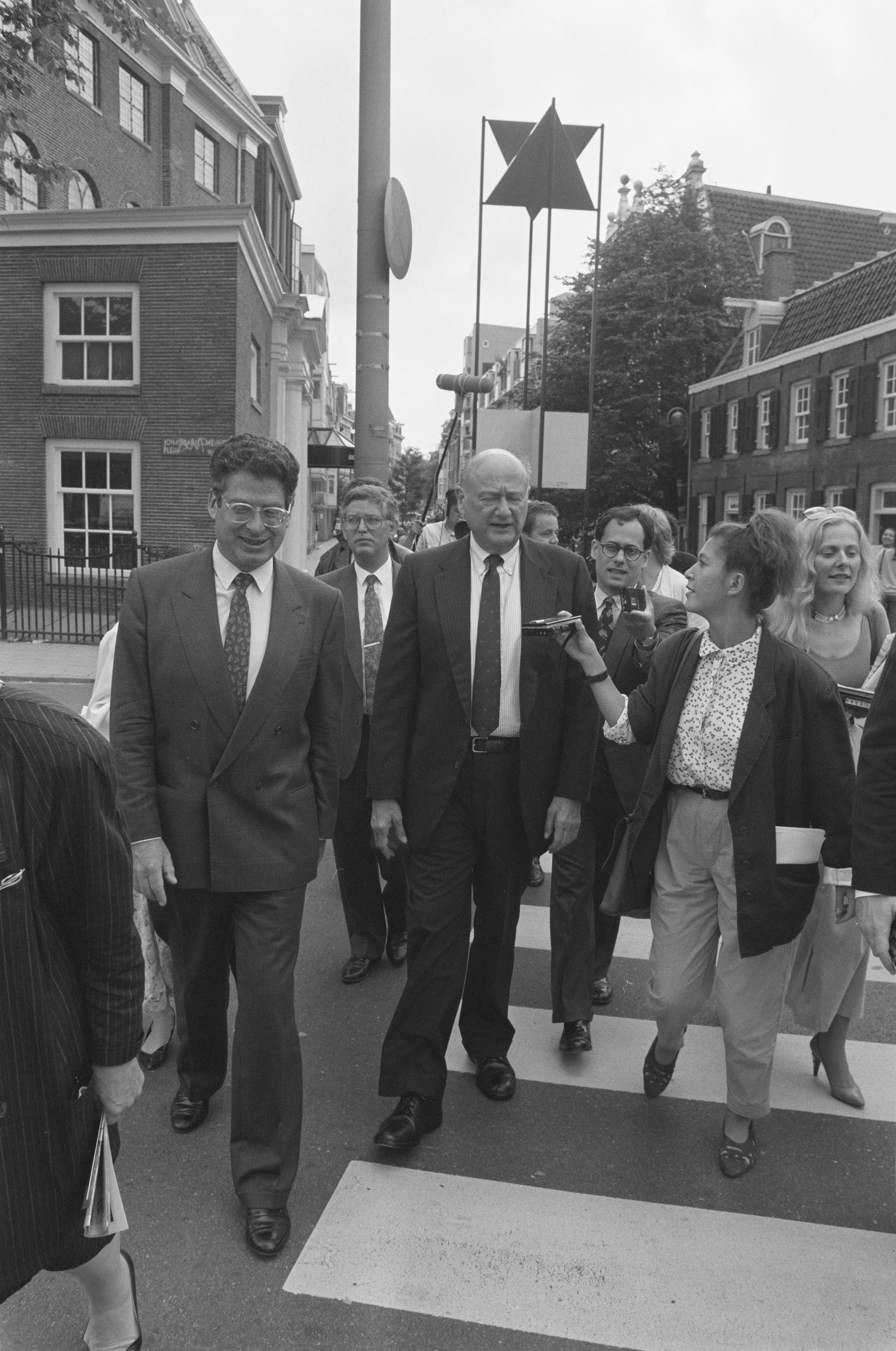
Koch with Ed van Thijn on a visit to Amsterdam in 1988

It has been said that race relations in Koch's last years in office were poor. He became a controversial figure in the 1988 presidential campaign with his public criticism of Democratic candidate Jesse Jackson, who surprised many political observers by winning key primaries in March and running even with the front-runner, Massachusetts Governor Michael Dukakis. As the April New York primary approached, Koch reminded voters of Jackson's earlier antisemitic statements, and said that Jews would be "crazy" to vote for Jackson. Koch endorsed Tennessee Senator Al Gore, who had run well in his native South but hadn't won 20% in a northern state. As Koch's anti-Jackson rhetoric intensified, Gore seemed to shy away from Koch. On primary day, Gore finished a weak third with 10% of the vote and dropped out of the race. Jackson ran ten points behind Dukakis, whose nomination became assured after his New York win.

==== Assessments ====
The legacy of Koch's 11-year mayoralty is a mixed one. A 1993 survey of historians, political scientists, and urban experts conducted by Melvin G. Holli of the University of Illinois at Chicago ranked Koch as the 15th-worst American big-city mayor to have served between 1820 and 1993. Other analyses rate his tenure more favorably.

In the final chapter of Ed Koch and the Rebuilding of New York City (Columbia University Press, 2010), NYU history professor Jonathan Soffer wrote: "Koch faced challenges greater than any New York mayor of the 20th century and met many of them." He added, "Koch bravely faced one of the worst crises in New York history, restructured the city with minimal help from the federal government and kept it solvent and growing for a generation." And Soffer concluded, "Koch's tireless personal lobbying campaign led to quite simply the greatest turnaround accomplished by any New York mayor in the twentieth century, including Fiorello La Guardia."

In The New York Times Book Review, Sam Roberts, former city editor for the New York Daily News and urban affairs correspondent for The New York Times, reconciled Holli's negative survey of 1993 with Soffer's analysis of 2010, writing, "Perhaps the survey was taken too soon, before Mr. Koch's legacy could be fully appreciated."

=== Post-mayoral years ===
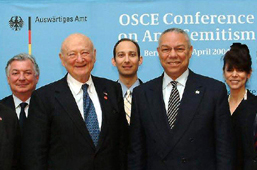
Koch and Colin Powell lead the US delegation for the 2004 Organization for Security and Co-operation in Europe Conference on Anti-Semitism, held in Berlin, Germany (April 28, 2004)

In the years following his mayoralty, Koch became a partner in the law firm of Robinson, Silverman, Pearce, Aronsohn, and Berman LLP (now Bryan Cave LLP) and a commentator on politics, as well as reviewing movies and restaurants for newspapers, radio and television. He also became an adjunct professor at New York University (NYU) and the judge on The People's Court for two years (1997–99) following the retirement of Judge Joseph Wapner. In 1999, he was a visiting professor at Brandeis University. Koch regularly appeared on the lecture circuit, and had a high-rated talk show on WABC radio. He also hosted his own online movie review show, The Mayor at the Movies.

A street in southern Tel Aviv was named after Koch in an August 12, 1993, ceremony attended by him alongside prominent Israeli and American dignitaries.

In 2004, together with his sister Pat (also Pauline) Koch Thaler, Koch wrote a children's book, Eddie, Harold's Little Brother; it tells the story of Koch's childhood, when he tried unsuccessfully to emulate his older brother Harold's baseball talents, before realizing that he should instead focus on what he was already good at, which was telling stories and speaking in public.

The New York City Council voted to rename the Queensboro Bridge the Ed Koch Queensboro Bridge on March 23, 2011. Later, city councilman Peter Vallone introduced legislation banning the naming of New York City property after people who are still alive, but the legislation failed.

Koch formed an organization called New York Uprising to push for statewide redistricting reform. In April 2011, he publicly upbraided 42 state legislators he claimed had broken their promises to support redistricting reform.

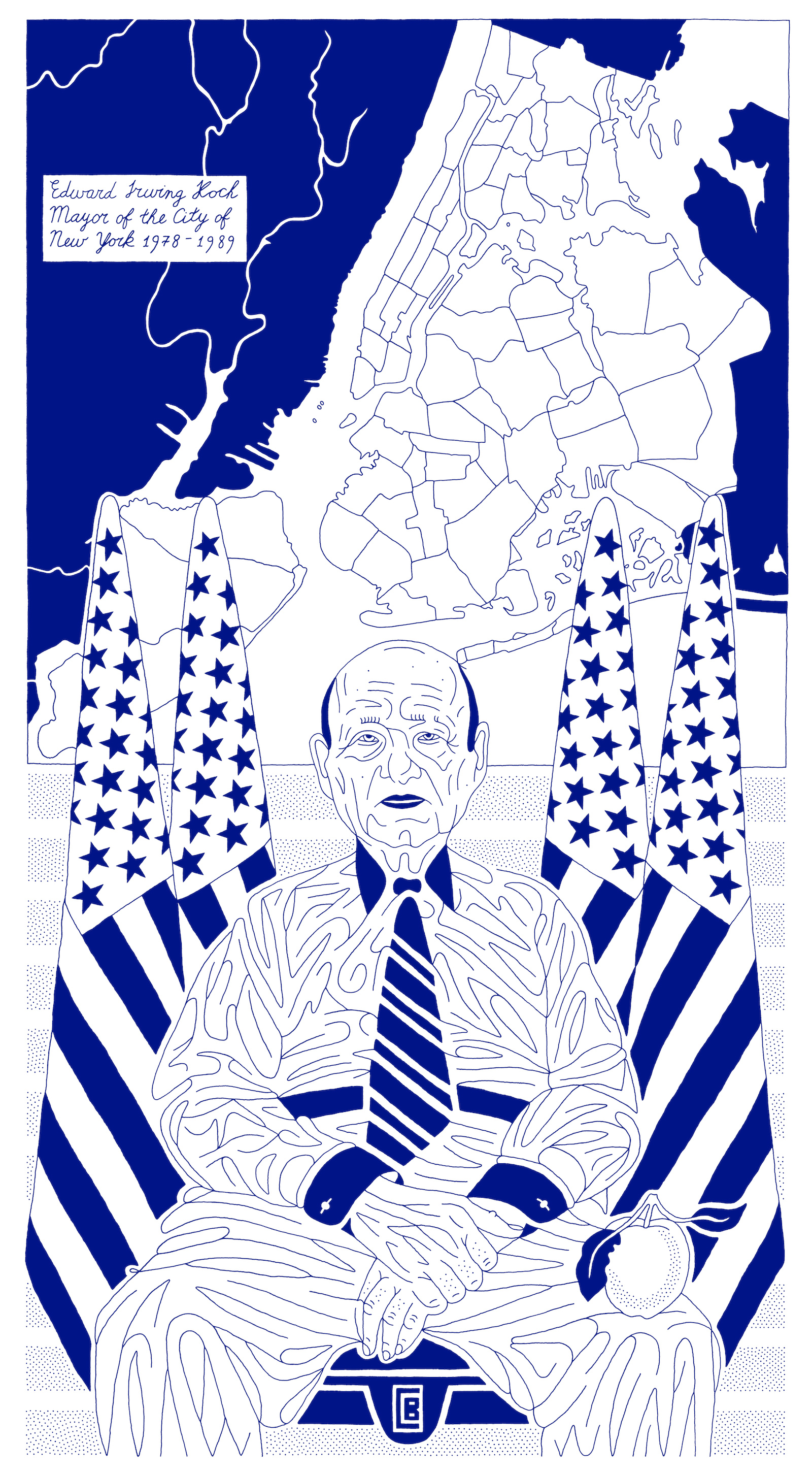
Portrait of Koch by Dmitry Borshch, 2011

In May 2011, Koch sat for a portrait by Dmitry Borshch that has been exhibited at the Institute of Oriental Studies of the Russian Academy of Sciences, DePaul University, Brecht Forum, and CUNY Graduate Center, and is included in the Catalog of American Portraits at the Smithsonian's National Portrait Gallery.

==== "Mayor at the Movies" ====
Koch began appearing in weekly movie review segments for an online show, Mayor at the Movies, in the summer of 2009. He was an avid moviegoer who often saw two or three movies a weekend. Although he was invited to private screenings, Koch preferred to see films with a public audience and was often approached by moviegoers who were surprised to find him there. His reviews were outspoken and wry, with his rating system consisting not of stars but of a "plus" for a good film or a "minus" for a bad one. He sought out great documentaries, and had a particular passion for anything of Jewish interest.

He had a particular passion for independent cinema and documentaries, but enjoyed dramas and action films as well. In addition to Mayor at the Movies, his film reviews were regularly featured on The Huffington Post and in the New York newspaper The Villager. Koch also appeared in more than 60 Hollywood films and television shows as himself, including Sex and the City, Spin City, Double Rush, a brief cameo in The Muppets Take Manhattan and also hosted Saturday Night Live. A documentary about his life, Koch, had its world premiere at the Hamptons International Film Festival on October 8, 2012, and was released theatrically on February 1, 2013 (coincidentally, the day of Koch's death).

=== Political endorsements ===
After leaving office, Koch frequently endorsed prominent Republican candidates, including Rudy Giuliani and Michael Bloomberg for mayor, Al D'Amato for U.S. Senate, Peter T. King for U.S. House, George Pataki for governor, and, in 2004, George W. Bush for president. Koch also endorsed Democrats, including Eliot Spitzer for governor in the 2006 election. He endorsed Bill Bradley for president in 2000.

Koch took back his endorsement of Spitzer in the aftermath of the governor's prostitution scandal. He said, "At the time the prostitution episode emerged, I commented that nothing could explain his behavior other than the fact that he had a screw loose in his head. Probably several."

Though Koch supported Giuliani's first mayoral bid, he became opposed to him in January 1996, and began writing a series of columns in the New York Daily News criticizing Giuliani, most frequently accusing him of being authoritarian and insensitive. In 1999, the columns were compiled into the book Giuliani: Nasty Man. He resumed his attacks, and had the book republished, in 2007, after Giuliani announced his candidacy for president. In May 2007, Koch called Giuliani "a control freak" and said that "he wouldn't meet with people he didn't agree with. That's pretty crazy." He also said that Giuliani "was imbued with the thought that if he was right, it was like a God-given right. That's not what we need in a president."

Koch originally endorsed Hillary Clinton for president during the 2008 campaign, then endorsed Democratic nominee Barack Obama in the general election. In his endorsement of Obama, Koch wrote that he felt that (unlike in 2004) both candidates would do their best to protect both the United States and Israel from terrorist attacks, but that he agreed with Obama's domestic policies much more and that the idea of Republican vice-presidential nominee Sarah Palin ascending to the presidency "would scare me". In 2010, he rescinded his support for Obama, saying that Obama could very well harm American–Israeli relations.

Koch endorsed Republican Bob Turner for Congress in 2011 because he "wanted to send a message to Obama to take a stronger position in support of Israel."

In October 2012, Koch told Al Sharpton that after a conversation with Obama about his position on Israel he was satisfied, and endorsed his reelection.

Early in 2013, Koch endorsed Christine Quinn in the Democratic primary for that year's mayoral election.

=== Other political statements ===
Koch often wrote in defense of Israel and against antisemitism. He also appeared in the documentary FahrenHYPE 9/11 defending President Bush and the wars in Iraq and Afghanistan and blasting Michael Moore. Koch was quoted in the film saying of Moore's film Fahrenheit 9/11, "It's not a documentary, it's a lie."

Koch praised New York Governor Andrew Cuomo, saying that he had the right approach in reducing government spending and refraining from raising taxes.

Koch was an early supporter of the Iraq War. In July 2007, Koch wrote that he was "bailing out" of his previous support for that war, due to the failure of the United States' NATO allies, and other Arab countries, to contribute to the war effort. Koch wrote, "I would support our troops remaining in Iraq if our allies were to join us. But they have made it clear they will not." He added that the U.S. must still "prepare for the battles that will take place on American soil by the Islamic forces of terror who are engaged in a war that will be waged by them against Western civilization for at least the next 30 years."

On April 8, 2010, Koch wrote a piece in The Jerusalem Post excoriating what he saw as increasing anti-Catholicism in the media, largely made evident by coverage of the priest sex abuse scandals. While denouncing the abuse, Koch wrote, "the procession of articles on the same events are, in my opinion, no longer intended to inform, but simply to castigate." He also wrote that he believed that many in the media, some themselves Catholic, exhibited such anti-Catholicism largely because of their opposition to the Catholic Church's teachings on such issues as abortion, homosexuality, and artificial contraception. He stated that, while he opposed the Church's teaching in all these matters, he firmly believed that the Church had the right to espouse these beliefs and to expect its members to espouse them as well, calling the Church "a force for good in the world, not evil."

== Wit ==
A practiced public speaker since his days stumping for Adlai Stevenson, Koch was well known for his quips and one-liners. A few include:

- (On the occasion of his primary loss to David Dinkins) "The people have spoken ... and they must be punished."
- "I'm the sort of person who will never get ulcers. Why? Because I say exactly what I think. I'm the sort of person who might give other people ulcers."
- "If you agree with me on nine out of 12 issues, vote for me. If you agree with me on 12 out of 12 issues, see a psychiatrist."

His repeatedly-used catch phrase was "How'm I doing?", said to indicate his awareness of the human appeal of showing interests in the opinions of others.

== Personal life ==
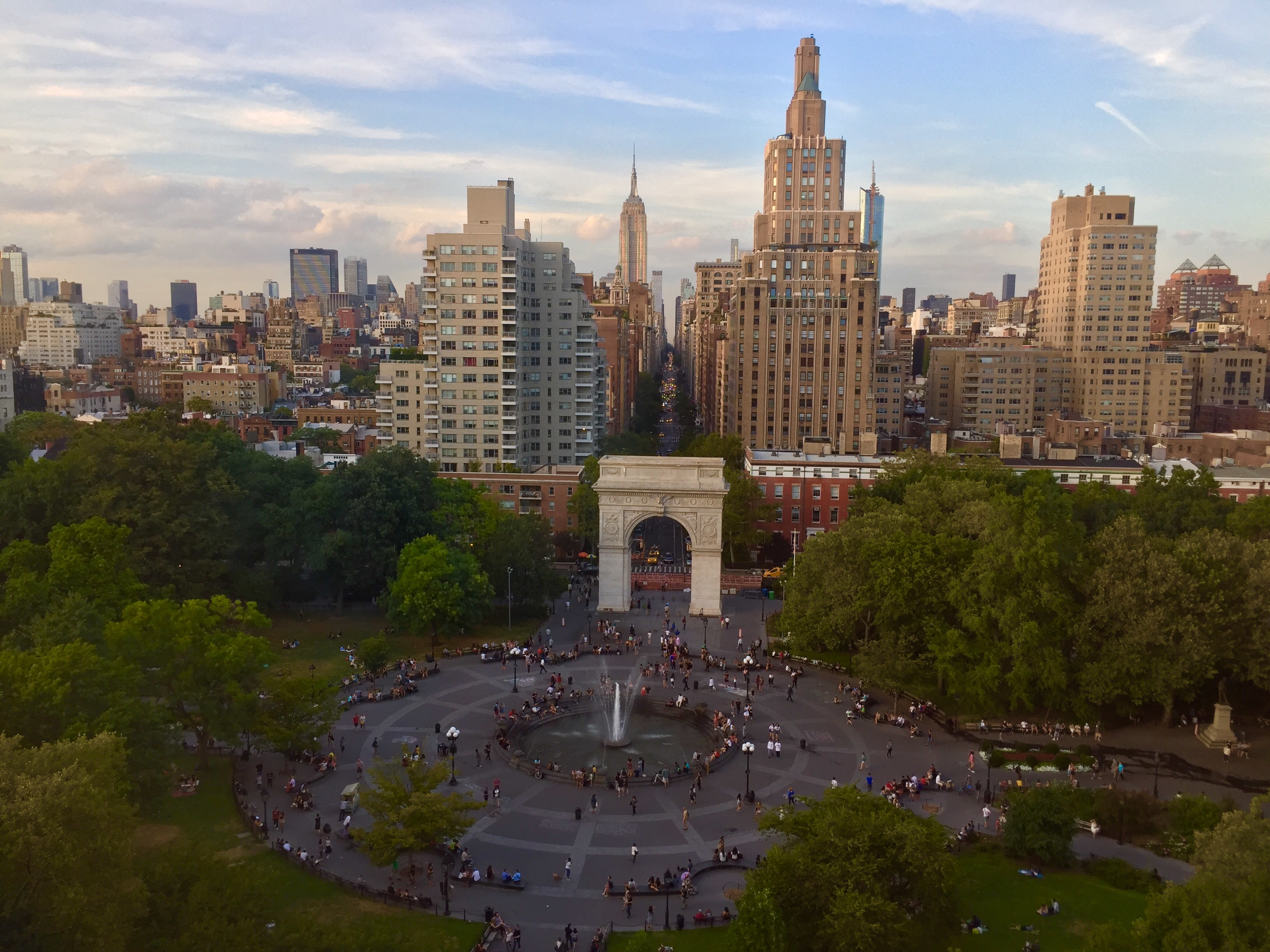
Prior to his death, Koch lived in an apartment at 2 Fifth Avenue (the high-rise building to the left of the Washington Square Arch, as seen in the background of a 2016 image of Washington Square Park).

Koch was a resident of Greenwich Village for most of his adult life. At the time of his death, he lived at 2 Fifth Avenue, overlooking Washington Square Park.

=== Sexuality ===
Koch never married and had no children. Rumors about his sexual orientation became an issue in the 1977 mayoral election with the appearance of placards and posters with the slogan "Vote for Cuomo, Not the Homo." Koch denounced the attack, and the Cuomo campaign disavowed them. Mario and Andrew Cuomo denied any involvement, but Koch and others did not believe them.

In 1989, Koch was interviewed about a book he had coauthored with Cardinal John J. O'Connor. When the interviewer asked Koch to clarify his views on homosexuality relative to those of O'Connor, Koch responded, "I happen to believe that there's nothing wrong with homosexuality. It's whatever God made you. It happens that I'm a heterosexual." He once told New York magazine, "Listen, there's no question that some New Yorkers think I'm gay, and voted for me nevertheless. The vast majority don't care, and others don't think I am. And I don't give a shit either way!" He was frequently accompanied at political functions by his friend Bess Myerson, who also acted as co-chair of his 1977 election campaign.

In a 2022 article, The New York Times confirmed Koch's homosexuality based on interviews with close confidants. The Times reported that Koch disclosed his sexuality only to friends who were also gay. His only known long-term relationship was with health care consultant Richard W. Nathan. Koch quickly ended the relationship after being elected mayor. In the 1980s, activist and writer Larry Kramer, who was critical of Koch's handling of the AIDS epidemic, unsuccessfully attempted to out him after learning of the relationship with Nathan. This influenced Koch's insistence on remaining closeted for the rest of his life, as he did not "want to give activists like Mr. Kramer the satisfaction of seeing him come out, after they had tried so hard to see him outed". In old age, Koch attempted to find a male romantic partner. He was unsuccessful, and he considered his lack of a partner the only pursuit of his life that he failed to accomplish.

=== Health, death, and funeral ===
Koch had a mild stroke in 1987, but was able to resume his duties as mayor within about a week.

After his mayoralty, Koch experienced further health problems that included problems with his heart. He was frequently hospitalized in the final months of his life. On January 31, 2013, he was admitted to Columbia University Irving Medical Center in Manhattan due to fatigue, where he died from heart failure at 2 a.m. the next day, aged 88. His funeral took place on February 4, 2013, at Temple Emanu-El, a Reform Jewish congregation in Manhattan. Former president Bill Clinton addressed the congregation, serving as President Obama's representative. Other speakers included then-mayor Michael Bloomberg. New York City Police Department helicopters gave a fly-over at the service.

Koch purchased a burial plot in Trinity Church Cemetery in April 2008 so that he could be buried in Manhattan. It is the only graveyard in the borough that accepts new burials. He chose to put the last words of the late journalist Daniel Pearl on his tombstone: "My father is Jewish, my mother is Jewish, I am Jewish."

== In popular culture ==
Koch appears as a character in the 2024 film The Apprentice, a biopic of Donald Trump, and was played by the Canadian actor Ian D. Clark.

== Works ==
- Koch, Edward I. (1980). The Mandate Millstone. US Conference of Mayors. OCLC 040152378. ASIN B00072XPA8
- Koch, Edward I. (1980). "The mandate millstone". National Affairs (61).
- Koch, Ed (1981). How'm I Doing?: The Wit and Wisdom of Ed Koch. New York: Lion Books. ISBN 0-87460-362-5.
- Rauch, William; Koch, Ed (1984). Mayor. New York: Simon and Schuster. ISBN 0-671-49536-4.
- Rauch, William; Koch, Ed (1985). Politics. New York: Simon & Schuster. ISBN 0-671-53296-0.
- Koch, Ed; O'Connor, John Joseph (1989). His Eminence and Hizzoner: A Candid Exchange. New York: Morrow. ISBN 0-688-07928-8.
- Jones, Leland T.; Koch, Ed (1990). All the Best: Letters from a Feisty Mayor. New York: Simon and Schuster. ISBN 0-671-69365-4.
- Paisner, Daniel; Koch, Ed (1992). Citizen Koch: An Autobiography. New York: St. Martin's Press. ISBN 0-312-08161-8.
- Koch, Ed (1994). Ed Koch on Everything: Movies, Politics, Personalities, Food, and Other Stuff. Carol Publishing Corporation. ISBN 1-55972-225-8.
- Resnicow, Herbert; Koch, Ed (1995). Murder at City Hall. New York: Kensington Books. ISBN 0-8217-5087-9.
- Koch, Edward I. (1997). Murder on Broadway. New York: Kensington. ISBN 1-57566-186-1.
- Koch, Ed (1997). Murder on 34th Street. New York: Kensington. ISBN 1-57566-232-9.
- Koch, Ed (1998). The Senator Must Die. New York: Kensington. ISBN 1-57566-325-2.
- Koch, Ed (1999). Giuliani: Nasty Man. New York: Barricade Books. ISBN 1-56980-155-X.
- Graham, Stephen; Koch, Ed (1999). New York: A State of Mind (Urban Tapestry Series). Towery Pub. ISBN 1-881096-76-9.
- Paisner, Daniel; Koch, Ed (2000). I'm Not Done Yet!: Keeping at It, Remaining Relevant, and Having the Time of My Life. New York: William Morrow. ISBN 0-688-17075-7.
- Warhola, James; Thaler, Pat Koch; Koch, Ed; Koch, Edward D. (2004). Eddie: Harold's Little Brother. New York: G. P. Putnam's sons. ISBN 0-399-24210-4.
- Heady, Christy; Koch, Edward D.; Koch, Ed (2007). Buzz: How to Create It and Win With It. New York, N.Y: American Management Association. ISBN 978-0-8144-7462-4.

== See also ==
- List of LGBT people from New York City
- List of Jewish members of the United States Congress
- List of mayors of New York City
- Timeline of New York City, 1970s–1980s

Political offices
Preceded by Woodward Kingman	Member of the New York City Council from the 2nd district 1967–1969	Succeeded by Carol Greitzer
Preceded by Abraham Beame	Mayor of New York City; 1978–1989	Succeeded by David Dinkins
U.S. House of Representatives
Preceded by Theodore Kupferman	Member of the U.S. House of Representatives from New York's 17th congressional district 1969–1973	Succeeded by John Murphy
Preceded by Charles Rangel	Member of the U.S. House of Representatives from New York's 18th congressional district 1973–1977	Succeeded by Bill Green
Party political offices
Preceded by Abraham Beame	Democratic nominee for Mayor of New York City; 1977, 1981, 1985	Succeeded by David Dinkins
Legal offices
Preceded by Joseph Wapner	Judge of The People's Court; 1997–1999	Succeeded by Jerry Sheindlin
