= Alton H. Maddox Jr. =

American lawyer (1945–2023)

- Born: Alton Henry Maddox Jr. July 21, 1945; Inkster, Michigan, U.S.
- Died: April 23, 2023 (aged 77); New York City, U.S.
- Education: Howard University (BA); Boston College (JD)
- Occupation: Lawyer
- Spouse: Leola Weaver Maddox (died 2017)
- Children: 1

Alton Henry Maddox Jr. (July 21, 1945 – April 23, 2023) was an American lawyer who was involved in several high-profile civil rights cases in New York City in the 1980s. He was disbarred in 1990 for refusing to appear before a disciplinary committee reviewing his actions while defending Tawana Brawley when she falsely claimed to have been raped by six white men; his actions had included accusing a district attorney being one of the six rapists. After disbarment, Maddox continued to advocate publicly for the rights of black New Yorkers accused of criminal activities.

== Education ==
Maddox was born on July 21, 1945, in Inkster, Michigan, and grew up in Newnan, Georgia. He began practicing law in 1976, after graduating from Howard University (BA, 1967) and Boston College Law School (JD, 1971).

== Clients ==
Maddox represented several alleged victims including the family of Michael Stewart, a Brooklyn man who died while in custody of the New York City Transit Police. Six officers were indicted for the death; all were found not guilty. Rudy Giuliani, then US Attorney in Manhattan, found insufficient evidence to warrant a federal grand jury investigation. A Metropolitan Transportation Authority report later faulted police for use of excessive force.

Maddox was the attorney for Cedric Sandiford and the family of manslaughter victim Michael Griffith in the Howard Beach incident. Maddox and other lawyers demanded a special prosecutor be appointed to the case, and the request was eventually granted. Maddox accused the New York City Police Department and Commissioner Benjamin Ward of a cover-up.

Maddox represented Tawana Brawley during the period of her rape allegations. Maddox, Al Sharpton, and C. Vernon Mason accused Assistant District Attorney Steven Pagones of abducting and raping Brawley. A grand jury did not charge Pagones.

The family of murder victim Yusuf Hawkins in the Bensonhurst incident was also one of Maddox's clients.

Maddox represented many defendants, including Michael Briscoe, arrested during the investigation into the alleged rape of the Central Park jogger. Briscoe was found not guilty in that case.

In 1984, Maddox was arrested and charged with obstruction of justice after a courtroom melee in which he and his client Willie Bosket were confronted by court officers.

Maddox was the defense lawyer for one of the two men hired by Marla Hanson's landlord to mutilate and disfigure her. Maddox challenged Hanson's character during the trial. This led New York State Assemblyman Dov Hikind to ask a grievance committee "to investigate the professional behavior of Mr. Maddox." Maddox responded, It's my job to question the character of Mr. Bowman. Law professor Stephen Gillers of New York University Law School said, "There's nothing unethical about what he is reported to have done."

Maddox also represented Al Sharpton in 1990, when Sharpton faced a 67-count indictment alleging fraud and theft. Sharpton was acquitted of all charges.

== Disciplinary actions ==
In 1990, Maddox was indefinitely suspended by the Appellate Division of the State Supreme Court in Brooklyn after failing to appear before a disciplinary hearing to answer allegations regarding his conduct in the Brawley case. Maddox never made an effort to get reinstated and return to court as a defense attorney, stating in 2003: "The white man thought that after 13 years I'd be so much on my knees.They don't know me."

In 1996, Maddox was ordered to pay New York State US$1,000 (equivalent to $2,000 in 2024) in legal costs for filing a false complaint of racial bias. He had alleged that he had had to apply to represent an indigent defendant in a murder case, while two lawyers who were white had been appointed to represent the other defendant in the case without having to apply. The state showed evidence that in fact, the two lawyers had applied and Maddox had filed a discrimination suit instead of going through the applications process. Michael Mukasey, at that time a Federal judge, ordered Maddox to pay New York State the legal costs it had incurred defending against the suit.

The following year, in 1997, Maddox and his group, the United African Movement, were fined $10,000 (equivalent to $19,600 in 2024) by New York City's Commission on Human Rights after they denied a white teacher access to a speech by Cornel West on the basis of her race.

== Other activities ==
Maddox was a Director of the National Conference of Black Lawyers Juvenile Defense Project. He was also the founder of the Center for Law & Social Justice at Medgar Evers College and co-sponsored the 1983 Congressional hearings on Police Brutality in New York City.

Maddox often contributed to publications such as Amsterdam News and was a frequent guest on WLIB radio's Sharp Talk program, hosted by Sharpton. He has also given speeches at several colleges and rallies. His 1995 speech prior to the Million Man March was criticized by commentators and the Anti-Defamation League for its support of a Louis Farrakhan quote characterizing Jews as "bloodsuckers".

== Personal life and death ==
Alton Maddox met Leola Weaver in Georgia, having met on a blind date; the couple married in 1967, and had one child, son Charles. Leola, a librarian who took on two jobs after Maddox was disbarred in 1990, died in April 2017.

Maddox died at a nursing home in The Bronx, New York City on April 23, 2023, at the age of 77. He had dementia in the years prior to his death.
