= Frank J. Barbaro =

Late New York elected official, judge

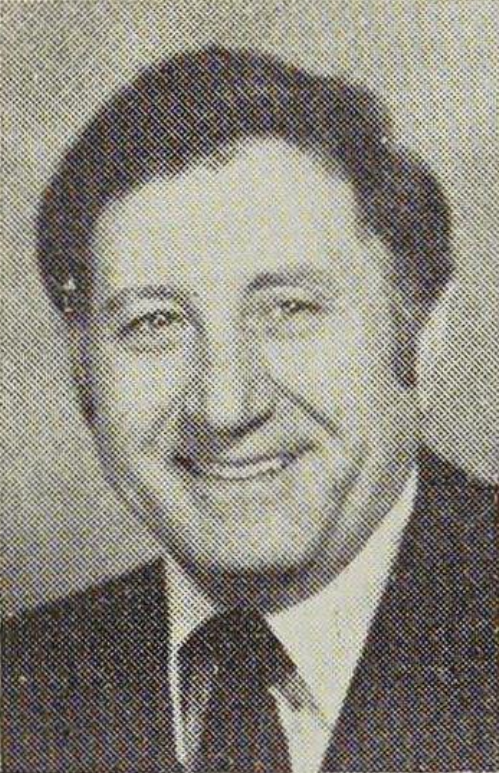
- portrait photograph, circa 1974

Judge of the New York Supreme Court
- In office 1997–2003

Member of the New York State Assembly from the 47th district
- In office January 1, 1973 – December 31, 1996
- Preceded by: Salvatore J. Grieco
- Succeeded by: William Colton

Personal details
- Born: December 18, 1927 New York City, New York, U.S.
- Died: September 4, 2016 (aged 88) Watervliet, New York, U.S.
- Party: Democratic
- Spouse: Mary Borysewicz
- Children: 3

Francesco Joseph Barbaro (December 18, 1927 – September 4, 2016) was an American politician and judge. He served as a Democratic Party member of the New York State Assembly from the 47th district (Bensonhurst, Brooklyn) from 1973 to 1996. He served as a judge on the New York Supreme Court from 1997 to 2003. He was also an unsuccessful nominee for mayor of New York City in 1981, running on the Unity ballot line against incumbent mayor Ed Koch.

== Early years ==
A son of immigrants, after high school he served in the navy before college (NYU, Brooklyn Law School). Prior to running for office he was a longshoreman.

== Career ==
Barbaro, a liberal Democrat, served as a member of the New York State Assembly from 1973 to 1996. He unsuccessfully ran against Ed Koch in the 1981 New York City mayoral election, running to his left; after Koch defeated him for the Democratic nomination, Barbaro ran in the general election as an independent candidate.

An example of Barbaro working as a legislator with others involved reclaiming a Bensonhurst public school that was transferred to the Transit Authority in 1981 due to it being underutilized. By 1992, with population growth, it was needed, yet in 1998 it still had not been given back.

=== Judge ===
Barbaro later served as a New York Supreme Court judge for six years (1997-2003).

In 1999, Barbaro presided over a bench trial for a murder case, finding the defendant guilty and sentencing him to 15 years to life in prison. The verdict was upheld in a 2004 appeal. However, Barbaro later felt his judgment was in error. In 2013, he testified in favor of reversing his decision, but it was again upheld, with Justice ShawnDya L. Simpson concluding that, while she was also deeply troubled by the case, there were no legal grounds to overturn the ruling.

=== Later political involvement ===
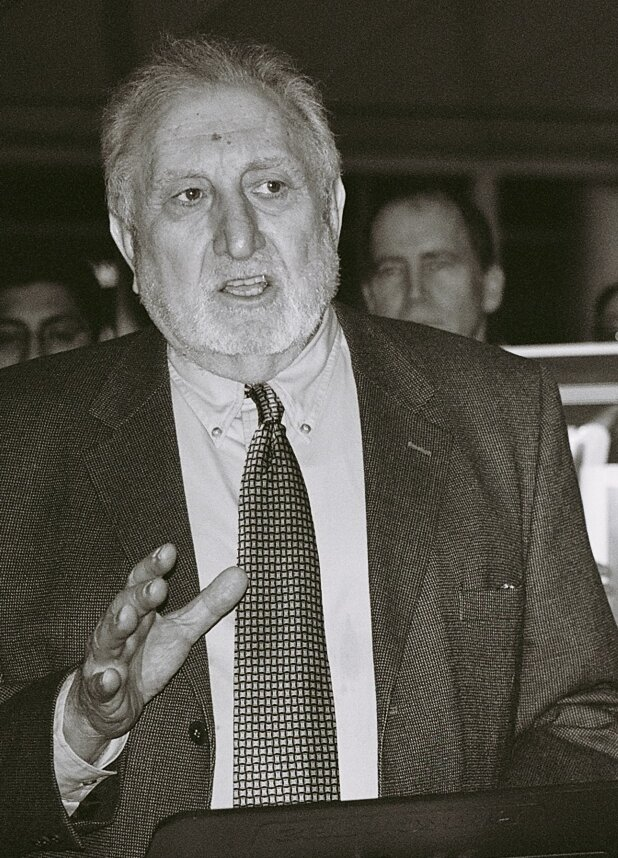
Barbaro, in 2007

In 2004, Barbaro ran for the U.S. House of Representatives in New York's 13th congressional district, losing to incumbent Republican Vito J. Fossella.

Barbaro served as a delegate for Bernie Sanders during the 2016 Democratic National Convention.

== Personal life and death ==
Barbaro ("BAR-ba-roe") and his wife, the former Mary Borysewicz, had three daughters.

In the 2000s, Barbaro moved from Brooklyn to Watervliet, New York. He died from heart failure at his home on September 4, 2016, at the age of 88.
