= Blind Faith (1998 film) =

American television drama film

- DVD cover
- Written by: Frank Military
- Directed by: Ernest R. Dickerson
- Starring: Charles S. Dutton; Courtney B. Vance; Kadeem Hardison; Garland Whitt
- Music by: Ron Carter
- Country of origin: United States
- Original language: English

Production
- Executive producers: Mace Neufeld; Robert Rehme
- Producer: Nick Grillo
- Production location: Toronto
- Cinematography: Rodney Charters
- Editor: Stephen Lovejoy
- Running time: 122 minutes
- Production company: Neufeld/Rehme Productions

Original release
- Network: Showtime
- Release: February 1, 1998

Blind Faith is a 1998 American drama television film directed by Ernest R. Dickerson and written by Frank Military. It stars Charles S. Dutton, Courtney B. Vance, Kadeem Hardison, Garland Whitt and Lonette McKee. It premiered at the Sundance Film Festival, and aired on February 1, 1998, on Showtime. The film's screenplay was nominated for an Independent Spirit Award, while Dutton received two nominations for awards, and Vance garnered one nomination. Set in the 1950s, during a murder trial, the film deals with themes of racism and homophobia.

It was filmed in Toronto, Ontario.

The film is dedicated to Yusef Hawkins, a black teenager who died nine years earlier in August 1989, after being attacked and shot by a white mob in Bensonhurst, Brooklyn.

== Plot ==
Set in 1957 in the Bronx, Charlie Williams Jr. is a Black 18-year-old male who is secretly gay. He is accused of killing a young white man in a nearby park late at night. The white man was one of seven young white men, who had ganged up and murdered his secret boyfriend David Mercer, who is black, during a hate crime based on his sexuality. Charlie is arrested and claims to have attempted to rob the white boy, stating that his death was accidental. Charlie purposefully concealed the truth so as not to expose his own homosexuality and shame his father. He is charged and put on trial, where the young white men lie and testify against him. During the trial, the circumstances of how it really happened are never revealed due to Charlie not wanting to displease his homophobic father, who is a well-respected police officer in line for a promotion to become the first Black sergeant. His uncle John represents him in court and discovers the truth about his nephew after conversing with his youngest brother, a jazz musician who is considered the black sheep of the family. Later, when the truth is finally revealed, the father is in denial that his son is gay, and is more focused on his promotion than finding out what really happened to Charlie that night. By then, it is too late as Charlie is sitting on death row waiting for the electric chair, having lost appeal after appeal. In the end, Charlie eventually hangs himself to make his father proud of him for being a man and keeping "the secret".

== Cast ==
- Charles S. Dutton as Charles Williams
- Courtney B. Vance as John Williams
- Kadeem Hardison as Eddie Williams
- Lonette McKee as Carol Williams
- Garland Whitt as Charles Williams Jr.
- Karen Glave as Anna Huggins
- Joel Gordon as David Mercer
- Sandra Caldwell as Paulette Mercer
- Aron Tager as Judge Aker
- Shawn Lawrence as Prosecuting Attorney
- Birdie M. Hale as Mrs. Barry
- Peter MacNeill as Captain McCully
- Jeff Clarke as Timothy

== Critical reception ==
Dennis Harvey, film reviewer for Variety wrote that the "screenplay has some stretches of hackneyed dialogue", but "generally has narrative punch and passion to spare". He was generally satisfied with the acting, saying "Vance anchors the action, alternating convincing courtroom savvy with a desperate, bittersweet familial loyalty...and Hardison, Whitt and Karen Glave ably lead the supporting scroll". Harvey also mentions the "racism and homophobia" being played out in the 1950s murder trial, and highlights the brief prelude to the movie where an older Vance (Charlie's lawyer) is seen in 1989 watching in disgust as the white perpetrators in the racially motivated murder of Yusef Hawkins "get wrist-slap punishment".

Janet Maslin wrote in The New York Times that the movie was "directed with conviction and restraint" and Courtney B. Vance's performance was "first-rate". She also suggested that in the end Blind Faith is "a father-son tragedy, with a lesson to be learned". In another review for the Times, Bernard Weinraub called the film a "drama on racism", and "the story, by Frank Military, a former actor, deals not only with racism but also homophobia".

== Nominations ==
- Screen Actors Guild Award for Outstanding Performance by a Male Actor in a Miniseries or Television Movie (Charles Dutton, nominated)
- Independent Spirit Award for Best Supporting Male (Charles Dutton, nominated)
- Independent Spirit Award for Best Male Lead (Courtney B. Vance, nominated)
- Independent Spirit Award for Best Screenplay (nominated)
