= Night. Sleep. Death. The Stars. =

2020 novel by Joyce Carol Oates

- First edition (US)
- Author: Joyce Carol Oates
- Language: English
- Publisher: Ecco Press
- Publication date: 2020
- Publication place: United States
- Pages: 789 pp
- OCLC: 1246540510

Night. Sleep. Death. The Stars. is a 2020 novel by American writer Joyce Carol Oates, about a man who was killed by the police and the aftermath of his death on his family. Its title comes from a poem by Walt Whitman.

== Plot ==
John Earle McClaren, nicknamed "Whitey", is a well-respected 67-year-old man who served as the mayor of Hammond, New York, and is the father of five children. Whitey, who is white, intervenes in a police stop of an Indian American man. He is tased by the police, suffers a stroke, and dies. The rest of the novel concerns the fall-out of Whitey's death for the McClaren family—Whitey's widow, Jessalyn, and his children, Beverly, Lorene, Thom, Virgil, and Sophia—including Jessalyn's relationship with a Cuban artist and Thom's pursuit of charges against the officers responsible for Whitey's death.

== Reception ==
Reviewing the novel in The New York Times, author Bret Anthony Johnston considered it a positive installment in Oates's engagement with the topic of race, comparing it favorably to her 2015 novel The Sacrifice, though he noted that its "considerable length" may dissuade readers. Hephzibah Anderson in The Guardian called it "an uncomfortable snapshot of modern-day America" and noted its resonance with the murder of George Floyd. Kirkus Reviews described it as "a brooding, thoughtful study of how people respond to stress and loss".
