= New Park Pizza =

Pizzeria in New York, U.S.

Coordinates: 40°39′45.9″N 73°50′25.3″W

New Park Pizza is a pizzeria in Queens, New York, United States.

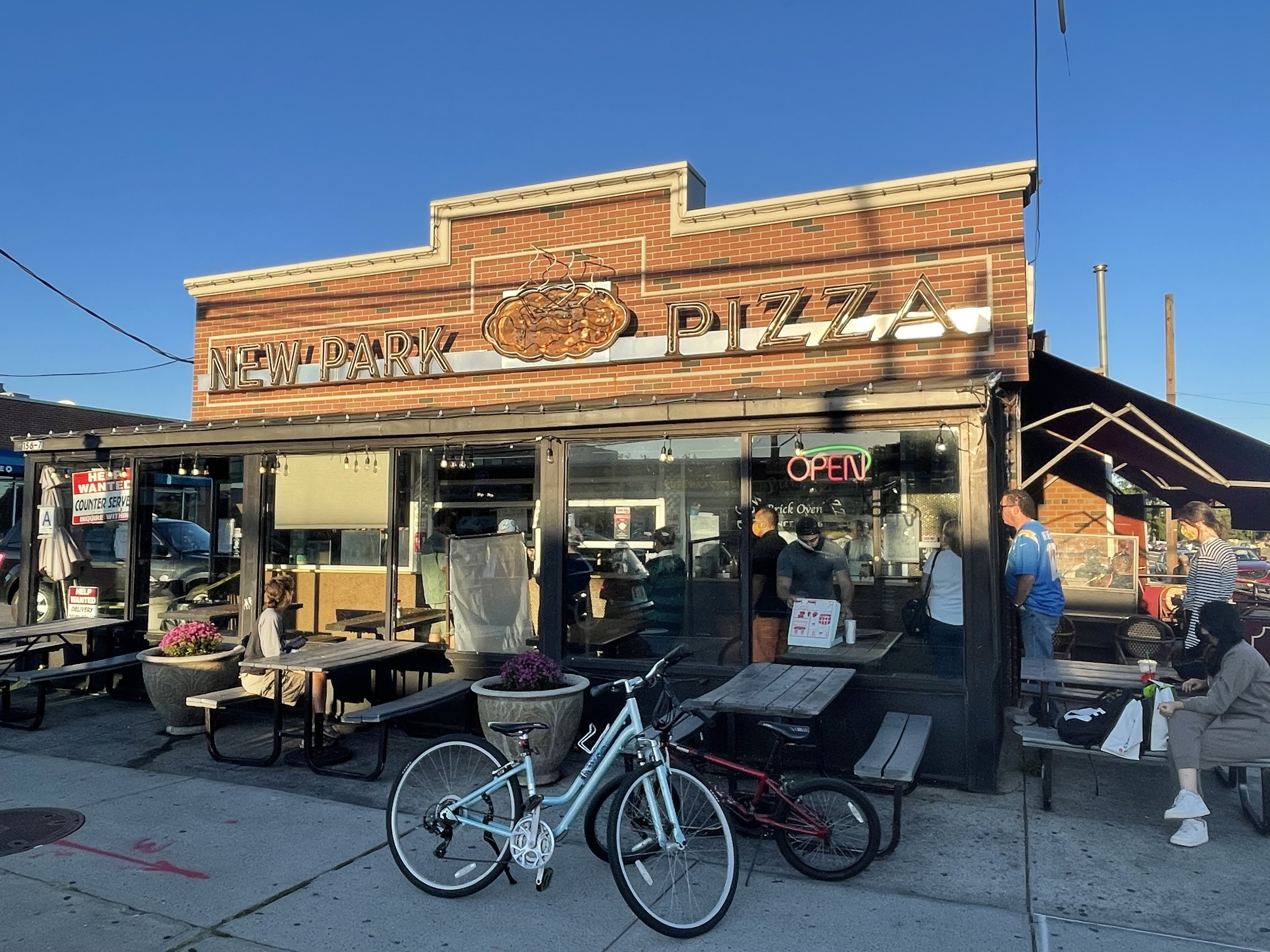
New Park Pizza, 2021

== History ==
New Park Pizza is located in the neighborhood of Howard Beach. It is notable for being close to JFK airport. The pizzeria has existed since 1956. New Park Pizza was vandalized in 2013. It was also the site of an anti-Black hate crime known as the Howard Beach Incident which occurred on December 20, 1986.

== Pizza ==
The pizza can be ordered well-done. The pizza is also characterized by its salty flavor: the pizza makers put salt in the oven before sliding the pie in.

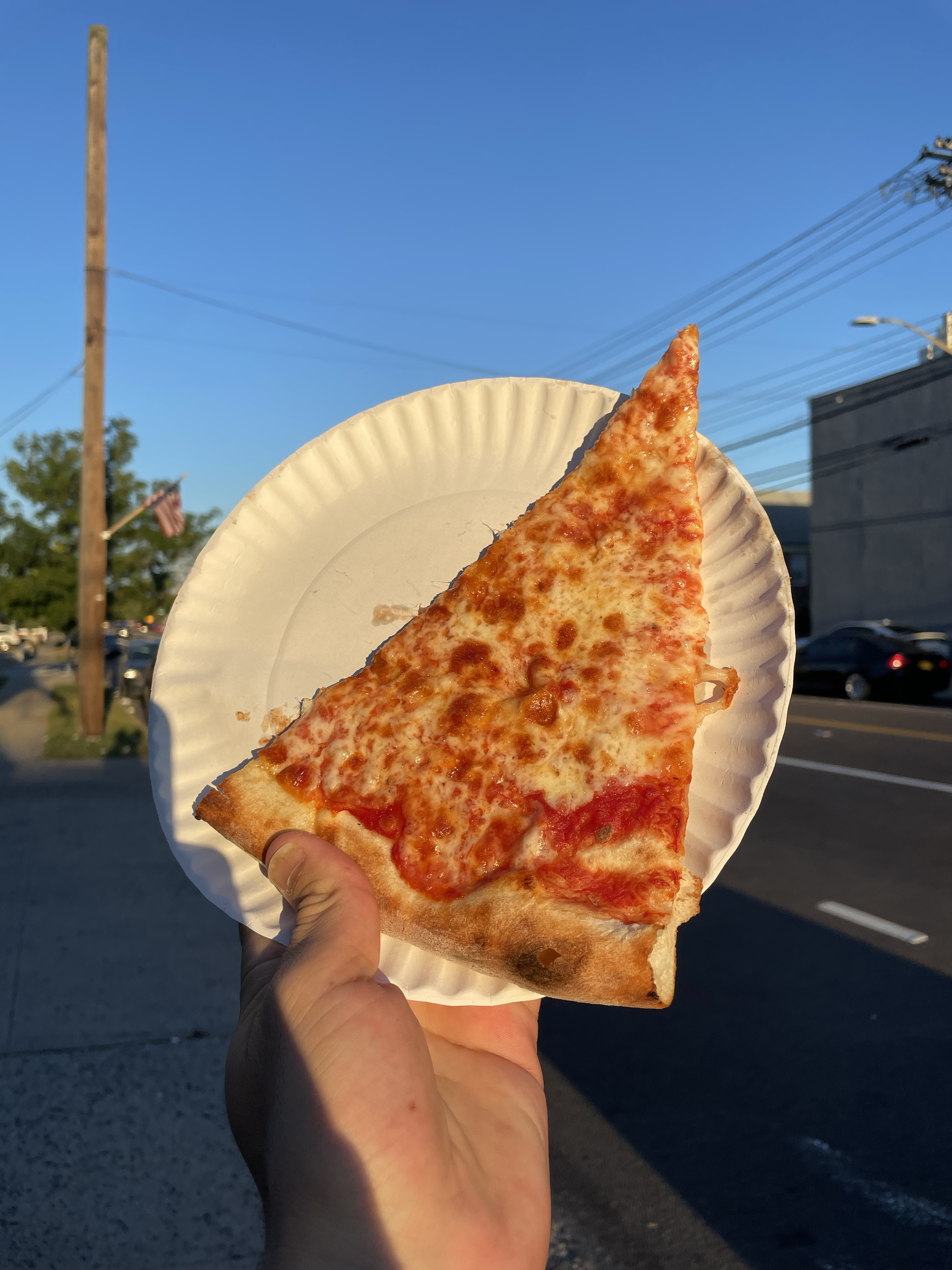
New York Style slice from New Park Pizza
