= Jeronimo Dominguez =

- Born: Jerónimo Domínguez; 1936; Pinilla de Toro, Zamora, Spain
- Died: May 27, 2008
- Occupation: Physician
- Known for: Roman Catholic activist

Jeronimo Dominguez (b. Jerónimo Domínguez, 1936 - May 27, 2008) was a Roman Catholic activist and physician. A radio and television host, he ran for Mayor of New York City in 1981. He also was a practicing internist.

Dominguez was born in Pinilla de Toro, Spain and received his medical degree summa cum laude from the University of Salamanca. In 1961, he moved to the United States and established a medical office in Washington Heights, New York City.

Shortly after his arrival, Dominguez became involved in the Hispanic Catholic community in New York City. He developed a weekly radio program that over 400 stations carried nationally and internationally. The author of at least 80 books and pamphlets on Catholic topics, Dominguez also had a weekly cable television program, La Biblia Vivida, in Manhattan.

A believer in the alleged apparitions of the Blessed Virgin Mary in Garabandal, Spain, Dominguez worked to promote the prophetic messages given there. While the 1961–65 apparitions have still not received the approval of Catholic authorities, Dominguez wrote and lectured extensively on these events, and was a close friend of Conchita Martinez, one of the Garabandal visionaries.

Dominguez was heavily involved in the anti-abortion movement. He ran for mayor of New York City in 1981 as candidate of the Right to Life Party, earning 30,000 votes but finishing a distant 5th behind winner Ed Koch. In 1979, Dominguez also ran an unsuccessful campaign for Bronx borough president. In both instances, Dominguez centered his campaigns on anti-abortion-rights positions.

During the 9/11 attacks, Dominguez's son Jerome, a policeman, was killed at the World Trade Center.

Dominguez died on May 27, 2008, and was buried in St. Raymond's Cemetery in the Bronx.
