= Tawana Brawley rape hoax =

1987 false accusations of rape in New York, US

Tawana Vicenia Brawley (born December 15, 1971) is an African American woman from New York who gained notoriety in November 1987 at age 15 when it was alleged she falsely accused four white men of kidnapping and raping her over a four-day period.

On November 28, 1987, Brawley was found in a trash bag after having been missing for four days from her home in Wappingers Falls, New York. She had racial slurs written on her body and was covered in feces. The feces came from a collie owned by a resident of the building where Brawley was found. Brawley accused four white men of having raped her. The charges received national attention in part because of the appalling condition in which she had been left, her young age, and the professional status of the persons she accused of the crime, including police officers and a prosecuting attorney. Brawley's advisers—Al Sharpton, Alton H. Maddox, and C. Vernon Mason—helped in bringing the case to national prominence.

After hearing evidence, a grand jury concluded in October 1988 that Brawley had not been the victim of a forcible sexual assault, and that she may have created the appearance of such an attack herself. Steven Pagones, the Greek American New York prosecutor whom Brawley had accused as being one of her assailants, later successfully sued Brawley and her three advisers for defamation.

Brawley received some support from the African American community. Some academics have suggested that Brawley was victimized by biased reporting that was influenced by racial stereotypes. The mainstream media's coverage drew heated criticism from the African American press, and from many black leaders who believed the teenager and her story. The grand jury's conclusions decreased support for Brawley and her advisers. Brawley's family have maintained that the allegations were true.

== Origins of the case ==
On November 28, 1987, Tawana Brawley, who had been missing for four days from her home in Wappingers Falls, New York, was found seemingly unconscious and unresponsive, lying in a garbage bag several feet from an apartment where she had once lived. Her clothing was torn and burned, her body smeared with feces. She was taken to the emergency room, where the words "Pimp-Nigger" and "KKK" were discovered written on her torso with charcoal.

A detective from the sheriff's juvenile aid bureau, among others, was summoned to interview Brawley, but she remained unresponsive. The family requested a black officer, which the police department was able to provide. Brawley, described as having an "extremely spacey" look on her face, communicated with this officer with nods of the head, shrugs of the shoulder, and written notes. The interview lasted 20 minutes, during which she uttered only one word: "neon". Through gestures and writing, she indicated she had been raped repeatedly in a wooded area by six white men, at least one of whom, she said, was a police officer.

A sexual assault kit was administered, and police began building a case. Brawley provided no names or descriptions of her assailants. She later told others that there had been no rape, only other kinds of sexual abuse. Forensic tests found no evidence of sexual assault or sexual intercourse. There was no evidence of exposure to elements, which would have been expected in a victim held for several days in the woods at a time when the temperature dropped below freezing at night.

== Public response ==
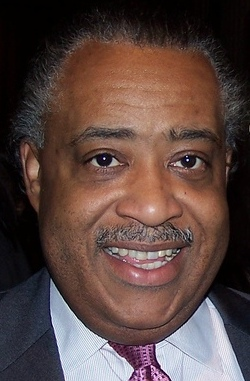
Al Sharpton (pictured in 2006) helped handle Brawley's publicity.

The initial public response to Brawley's story was mostly sympathetic. Bill Cosby offered a $25,000 reward for information on the case, while Don King pledged $100,000 toward Brawley's education. In December 1987, more than one thousand people, including Nation of Islam leader Louis Farrakhan, marched through the streets of Newburgh, New York, in support of Brawley.

Brawley's claims in the case captured headlines across the country. Public rallies were held denouncing the incident. When civil rights activist Al Sharpton, with attorneys Alton H. Maddox and C. Vernon Mason, began handling Brawley's publicity, the case quickly became highly controversial. Sharpton, Maddox, and Mason generated a national media sensation. The three said that officials all the way up to the state government were trying to cover up defendants in the case because they were white. They further suggested that the Ku Klux Klan, the Irish Republican Army, and the Mafia had conspired with the U.S. government in the alleged cover-up.

Harry Crist Jr. became a suspect in the case because he committed suicide shortly after the period when Brawley was allegedly held captive, and was a part-time police officer in Fishkill, New York, which borders Brawley's hometown. Steven Pagones, an assistant district attorney in Dutchess County, New York, attempted to establish an alibi for Crist, stating that he had been with Crist during that period of time.

Sharpton, Maddox, and Mason then said that Crist and Pagones were two of the rapists. They also accused Pagones, a Greek American, of being a racist and a white supremacist. Based on Crist's suicide note, The New York Times reported that he killed himself because his girlfriend ended their relationship shortly before his death, and because he was upset that he was unable to become a state trooper.

The mainstream media's coverage drew heated criticism from the African American press and leaders for its treatment of the teenager. They cited the leaking and publication of photos taken of her at the hospital, and the revelation of her name despite her being underage. Critics were concerned that Brawley had been left in the custody of her mother, stepfather, and advisers, rather than being given protection by the state. In an opinion piece in The New York Times, Martha Miles and Richard L. Madden wrote:

State law provides that if a child appears to have been sexually molested, then the Child Protective Services Agency is supposed to take jurisdiction and custody of that child. Now, Tawana Brawley was 15 at the time of the incident. If that had been done... early on, the agency would have given her psychiatric attention and preserved evidence of rape...

Sharpton's former aide, Perry McKinnon, said that Sharpton, Maddox, and Mason were unconcerned with Brawley, and were using the case to "tak[e] over the town," as he had heard Sharpton say that the case could make him and Brawley's other two advisers "the biggest niggers in New York." In June 1988, at the height of the controversy surrounding the case, a poll showed a gap of 34 percentage points between blacks (51%) and whites (85%) on the question of whether Brawley was lying.

== Grand jury hearings ==
Faced with an uncooperative Brawley, who was advised by Sharpton, Maddox, and Mason not to answer questions, New York governor Mario Cuomo eventually appointed the state's attorney general, Robert Abrams, as special prosecutor for the case. A grand jury was convened to hear evidence, with John M. Ryan, Abrams's assistant in charge of criminal prosecutions, delegated the responsibility of leading the investigation. Brawley's team employed a general strategy of discouraging Brawley and her family from testifying, which they justified by claiming that an unjust refusal by the state to prosecute the alleged attackers was inevitable.

Their inflammatory rhetoric and tactics, such as conditioning interviews with investigators on Cuomo, Abrams and Ryan undergoing psychological evaluations, were viewed by many as flippant and inappropriate. Sharpton, in particular, drew criticism for comparing requests to meet with Abrams, known for his strong record on civil rights, to "asking someone who watched someone killed in the gas chamber to sit down with Mr. Hitler." When Roger L. Green, an influential Black member of the New York State Assembly, spoke out against language he perceived as unhelpful and needlessly divisive, Sharpton responded by calling him "a state-sponsored Uncle Tom."

On October 6, 1988, the grand jury released its 170-page report that concluded Brawley had not been abducted, assaulted, raped, or sodomized, as Brawley and her advisers said. The report further concluded that the allegations against Pagones and Crist were false and had no basis in fact. Before issuing the report, the grand jury heard from 180 witnesses, saw 250 exhibits, and recorded more than 6,000 pages of testimony.

In the decision, the grand jury noted many problems with Brawley's story. Among these were that the rape kit results did not indicate sexual assault. Additionally, despite saying she had been held captive outdoors for days, Brawley was not suffering from hypothermia, was well-nourished, and appeared to have brushed her teeth recently. Despite her clothing being charred, there were no burns on her body. Although a shoe she was wearing was cut through, Brawley had no injuries to her foot.

The racial epithets written on her were upside down, which led to suspicion that Brawley herself had written the words. Testimony from her schoolmates indicated she had attended a local party during the time of her supposed abduction. One witness claimed to have observed Brawley's climbing into the garbage bag. The feces on her body were identified as coming from her neighbor's dog. Brawley never testified, despite a subpoena ordering her to do so, nor did Brawley ever provide a detailed account of her allegations or name any of her alleged attackers.

On June 6, 1988, Tawana's mother, Glenda Brawley, was sentenced to 30 days in prison, and fined $250 for contempt of court for refusing to testify at the grand jury hearing. She evaded arrest by hiding in churches, with the police failing to arrest her, arguing it would lead to violence. The Brawley family then fled New York state, travelling around the country for several months before settling in Virginia Beach.

=== Possible motives ===
Much of the grand jury evidence pointed to a possible motive for Brawley's falsifying the incident: trying to avoid violent punishment from her mother and particularly her stepfather, Ralph King. Witnesses testified that Glenda Brawley had previously beaten her daughter for running away, and for spending nights with boys. King had a history of violence that included stabbing his first wife 14 times, which later escalated into him shooting and killing her.

There was considerable evidence that King could and would violently attack Brawley: when Brawley had been arrested on a shoplifting charge the previous May, King attempted to beat her for the offense while at the police station. Witnesses also described King as having talked about his stepdaughter in a sexualizing manner.

On the day of her alleged disappearance, Brawley had skipped school to visit her boyfriend, Todd Buxton, who was serving a six-month jail sentence. When Buxton's mother, with whom she had visited Buxton in jail, urged her to get home before she got in trouble, Brawley told her, "I'm already in trouble." She described how angry King was over a previous incident of her staying out late.

Neighbors also told the grand jury that in February they overheard Glenda Brawley saying to King, "You shouldn't have took the money because after it all comes out, they're going to find out the truth." Another neighbor heard Mrs. Brawley say, "They know we're lying, and they're going to find out and come and get us."

In April 1989, New York Newsday published claims by a boyfriend of Brawley, Daryl Rodriguez, that she had told him the story was fabricated, with help from her mother, to avert the wrath of her stepfather. Writing about the case in a 2004 book on perceptions of racial violence, sociologist Jonathan Markovitz concluded that "it is reasonable to suggest that Brawley's fear and the kinds of suffering that she must have gone through must have been truly staggering if they were enough to force her to resort to cutting her hair, covering herself in feces, and crawling into a garbage bag."

== Aftermath ==
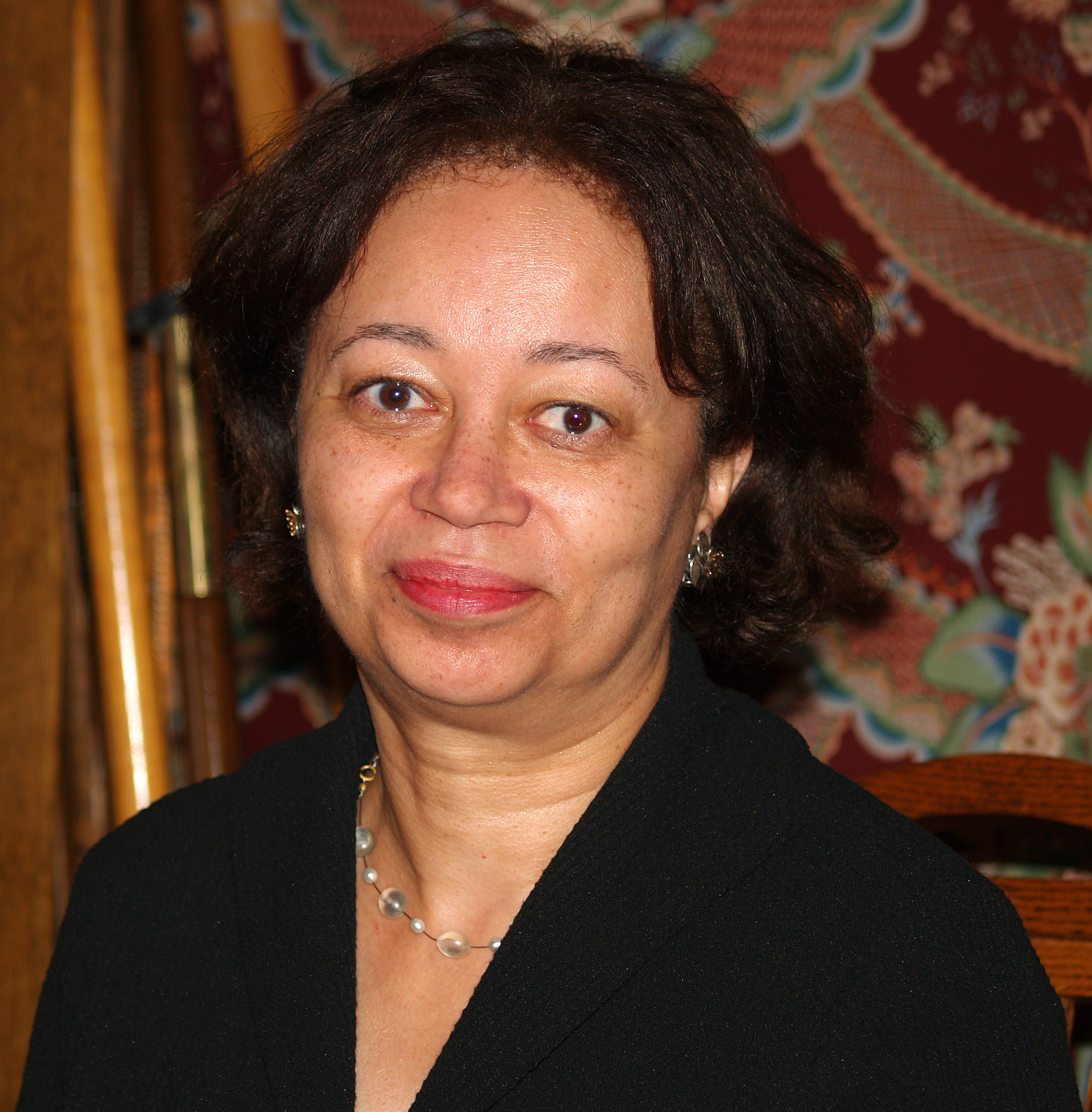
Patricia J. Williams (pictured in 2007) maintained that Brawley was the victim of a crime.

The case highlighted mistrust of legal institutions within the black community. Legal scholar Patricia J. Williams wrote in 1991 that the teenager "has been the victim of some unspeakable crime. No matter how she got there. No matter who did it to her—and even if she did it to herself." These comments aroused controversy as well; Daniel A. Farber and Suzanna Sherry responded to Williams in their book Beyond All Reason: The Radical Assault on Truth in American Law, writing "The radical multiculturalists seem unable or unwilling to differentiate between Brawley's fantasized rape and another woman's real one. Indifference to the distinction between fact and fiction minimizes real suffering by implying that it is no worse than imagined or self-inflicted suffering."

Reviewing Spike Lee's film Do the Right Thing, cultural critic Stanley Crouch wrote negatively of "men like Vernon Mason who sold out a good reputation in a cynical bid for political power by pimping real victims of racism in order to smoke-screen Tawana Brawley's lies."

On May 21, 1990, Alton H. Maddox was indefinitely suspended by the Appellate Division of the State Supreme Court in Brooklyn after failing to appear before a disciplinary hearing, to answer allegations regarding his conduct in the Brawley case. Vernon Mason was disbarred for 66 cases of misconduct in 1995. While the Brawley case was not specifically cited, Mason claimed that he was being punished for his role in promoting Brawley's accusations.

In 1998, Pagones was awarded $345,000 through a lawsuit for defamation of character that he had brought against Sharpton, Maddox and Mason. Pagones initially sought $395 million. The jury found Sharpton liable for making seven defamatory statements about Pagones, Maddox for two and Mason for one. The jury deadlocked on four of the 22 statements over which Pagones had sued, and it found eight statements to be non-defamatory. In a later interview, Pagones said the turmoil caused by the accusations of Brawley and her advisers had cost him his first marriage and much personal grief.

Pagones also sued Brawley. She defaulted by not appearing at the trial, and the judge ordered her to pay Pagones damages of $185,000. The $65,000 judgment levied against Al Sharpton was paid for him in 2001 by supporters, including attorney Johnnie Cochran and businessman Earl G. Graves, Jr. In December 2012, the New York Post reported that Maddox had paid his judgment of $97,000 and Mason was making payments on the $188,000 which he owed. Brawley reportedly had not made any payments. The following month a court ordered her wages garnished to pay Pagones.

In a 1997 appearance, Brawley maintained she did not invent the story; she still had supporters. In November 2007, Brawley's stepfather and mother, in a 20th-anniversary feature for the New York Daily News, contended the attack happened. "How could we make this up and take down the state of New York? We're just regular people," Glenda Brawley said. They said they had asked New York State Attorney General Andrew Cuomo and Governor Eliot Spitzer to reopen the case. They also said that Brawley would speak at any legal proceedings. Influenced by her interactions with Farrakhan who had supported her, Brawley converted to Islam during the trial. According to a November 2007 NY Daily News report, she remained a member of the Nation of Islam.

In 1991, Michael Hardy, who served as Sharpton's defense lawyer in Pagones' defamation case against him, became a prominent founder of Sharpton's organization National Action Network, where he served as Executive Vice President and later also General Counsel.

== In popular culture ==
- Spike Lee's 1989 film Do the Right Thing features a shot of graffiti that reads "Tawana told the truth."
- Brawley appeared alongside Sharpton in the 1989 music video for Public Enemy's "Fight the Power", which was directed and produced by Lee.
- The 1990 Law & Order episode "Out of the Half-Light" is a fictionalized retelling of the Brawley case. The case is also discussed in the 2014 Law & Order: Special Victims Unit episode "Criminal Stories".
- Brawley is referenced by Lisa "Left Eye" Lopes in the song "His Story" from TLC's debut album Ooooooohhh... On the TLC Tip (1992).
- Brawley is referenced by Public Enemy in the song "Revolutionary Generation" from Public Enemy's album Fear of a Black Planet (1989).
- Joyce Carol Oates's 2015 novel The Sacrifice is a fictionalized account of the Brawley case.
- In 2018, the case was covered in Fox Nation's Scandalous.

== See also ==
- A Rape on Campus – Retracted 2014 Rolling Stone article
- Crystal Mangum – American stripper and murderer (born 1978)
- Domestic violence – Abuse of members of the same household
- Duke lacrosse case – 2006 criminal case in Durham, North Carolina, United States
- False accusation of rape – Reporting of a rape where no rape has occurred
- Marissa Alexander case – American legal case involving self-defense
- Racial hoax – False claim about a crime
