= C. Vernon Mason =

American civil rights advocate and former lawyer

- Born: 1946 or 1947 (age 79–80)
- Education: Morehouse College; Indiana University Bloomington; Columbia Law School; New York Theological Seminary
- Occupation: Attorney
- Known for: Civil rights advocacy

C. Vernon Mason is a former lawyer and civil rights advocate from Tucker, Arkansas. Best known for his involvement in several high-profile New York City cases in the 1980s, including the Bernhard Goetz, Howard Beach, and Tawana Brawley incidents, Mason has not practiced law since his 1995 disbarment. He then was the CEO of a non-profit organization. He is also an ordained minister.

== Education ==
Mason graduated from Morehouse College and earned a Master in Business Administration from Indiana University Bloomington. He then graduated from Columbia Law School earning a Juris Doctor and, later, earned the Master of Divinity, and the Doctor of Ministry degree from New York Theological Seminary.

== Legal career ==
In 1983 Mason and William Kunstler represented serial killer Lemuel Smith at his trial for the murder of Donna Payant.

Mason was co-counsel for Darrell Cabey, one of the four men shot by Bernhard Goetz in the famous 1984 "subway vigilante" case.

Mason was one of the lawyers retained by the family of Michael Griffith, manslaughter victim in the Howard Beach incident.

In 1987 Mason, along with Alton H. Maddox and Al Sharpton, were advisors to Tawana Brawley, an African-American teenager who claimed to have been abducted and sexually assaulted by at least three white men, including at least one police officer and assistant district attorney Steven Pagones. However, a grand jury investigation into Brawley's allegations determined that she "had not been abducted, assaulted, raped and sodomized as had been claimed" and that "the 'unsworn public allegations against Dutchess County Assistant District Attorney Steven Pagones' were false and had no basis in fact." Pagones filed a $385 million lawsuit against Brawley and her advisors for 22 purported defamatory statements; Mason was found liable for making one defamatory statement and ordered to pay $185,000.

=== Disbarment ===
Mason was disbarred by the New York Supreme Court, Appellate Division, First Department, in 1995. The court cited 66 instances of professional misconduct with 20 clients over the course of 6 years as its rationale for the action, including "repeated neglect of client matters, many of which concerned criminal cases where a client's liberty was at stake; misrepresentations to clients [and] refusal to refund the unearned portion of fees". Though Mason's involvement in the Brawley case was not specifically cited, Mason would allege that the ruling was intended to punish him for the Brawley case.

== Clerical career ==
In March 1999, four years after earning his Master of Divinity from New York Theological Seminary, Mason was ordained as a Baptist minister at the Abyssinian Baptist Church in Harlem. In October 2024, he and other leaders of the church filed a lawsuit in state court alleging that a recent pastoral election violated the church's bylaws. In early 2025, he took a position at the Friendship Baptist Church in Harlem.
