= Murder of Yusef Hawkins =

Fatal shooting in Brooklyn, New York in 1989

Yusef Hawkins
- Born: March 19, 1973
- Died: August 23, 1989 (aged 16); Bensonhurst, Brooklyn, New York City, United States
- Cause of death: Murder by shooting
- Occupation: Student
- Known for: Murder victim

Yusef Kirriem Hawkins (also spelled as Yusuf Hawkins, March 19, 1973 – August 23, 1989) was a 16-year-old Black teenager from the neighborhood of East New York, in the New York City borough of Brooklyn, who was shot to death on August 23, 1989, in Bensonhurst, a predominantly Italian-American working-class neighborhood in Brooklyn. Hawkins, his younger brother, and two friends were attacked by a crowd of 10 to 30 white youths, with at least seven of them wielding baseball bats. One, armed with a handgun, shot Hawkins twice in the chest, killing him. Four people were convicted for their part in the incident, including a prison term for second-degree murder given to the shooter. In 2005, former Gambino crime family member Joseph D'Angelo admitted that the killers were present at his request, meant to serve as protection for his property from an expected racially motivated situation, which instead created the situation.

== Incident ==
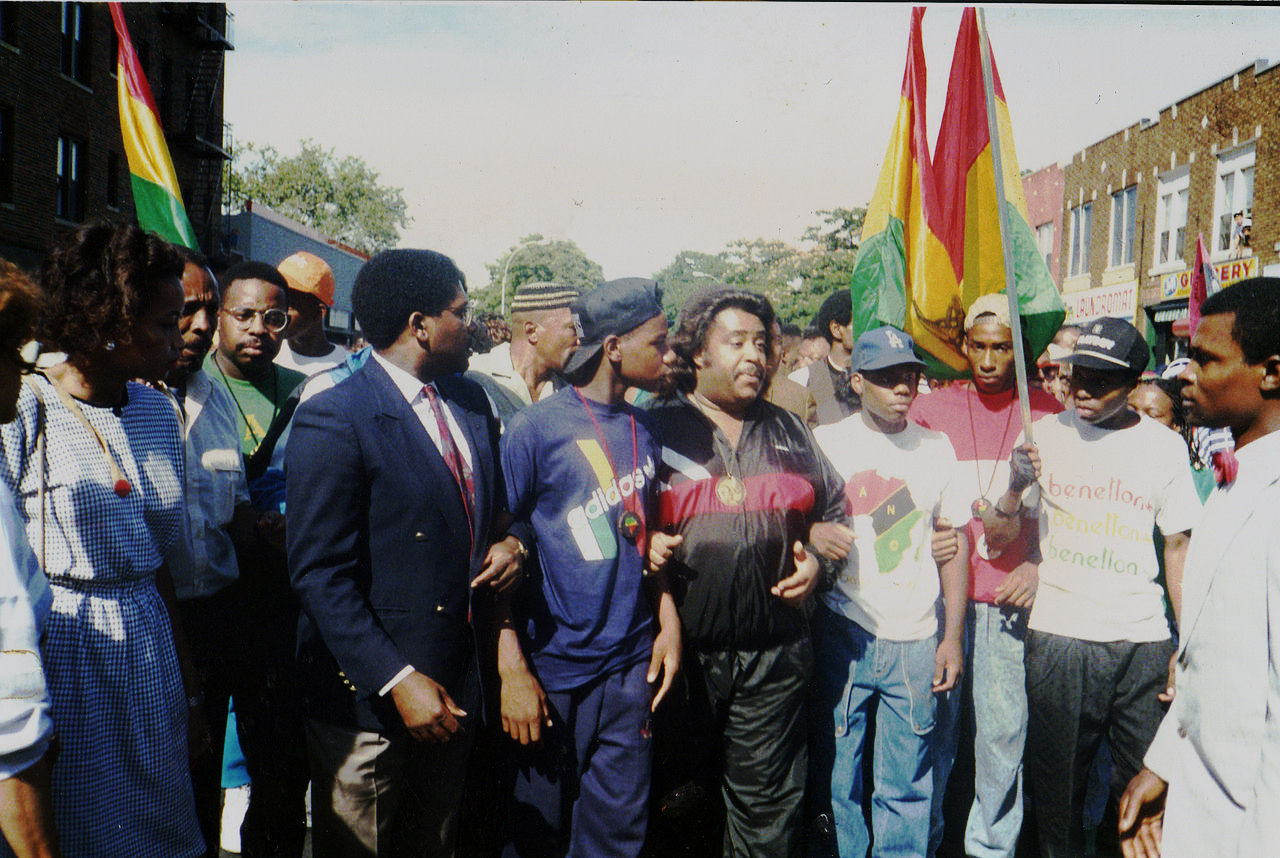
Al Sharpton leading the first protest march over the murder of Yusef Hawkins in Bensonhurst, 1989.

Hawkins had gone to Bensonhurst that night with his brother and two of their friends to inquire about a used 1982 Pontiac automobile that was for sale. The group's attackers had been lying in wait for black youths that were expected to attend a party at the home of a teenage girl in the neighborhood. Some say the girl had previously dated one of the killers and/or she had invited black youths to her neighborhood to taunt the neighborhood boys. Hawkins and his friends walked onto the ambushers' block unaware that local residents were waiting to attack any group of black youths they saw. After the murder of Hawkins, police said that he had not in any way been involved with the neighborhood girl whom the killers believed Hawkins was dating.

Hawkins' death was the third killing of a black male by white mobs in New York City during the 1980s; the other two victims were Willie Turks, who was killed on June 22, 1982, in Brooklyn, and Michael Griffith, who was killed in Queens on December 20, 1986. The incident uncorked a torrent of racial tension in New York City in the ensuing days and weeks, culminating in a series of protest marches through the neighborhood led by the Reverend Al Sharpton.

== Trials ==
The two teenagers who led the mob that beat and chased Hawkins were tried separately. Joseph Fama, the man who fired the shots that killed Hawkins, was convicted of second-degree murder on May 17, 1990. The other main defendant in the case, Keith Mondello, was acquitted on May 18, 1990, on murder and manslaughter charges, but convicted of 12 lesser charges including riot, menacing, discrimination, unlawful imprisonment and criminal possession of a weapon. The acquittal of Mondello on the most serious charges led to further protest marches through Bensonhurst led by Al Sharpton.

On June 11, 1990, sentences were handed down in the Hawkins case. Nineteen-year-old Fama received a sentence of 32 1/3 years to life in prison. Mondello, also 19, received a sentence of 5 1/3 to 16 years in prison.

Other members of the gang that chased and beat Hawkins were tried as well. John Vento was convicted of unlawful imprisonment and received a sentence of 2 to 8 years in August 1990 and was released in 1998. A fourth man, Joseph Serrano, was convicted on the charge of unlawfully possessing a weapon and sentenced to 300 hours of community service on January 11, 1991. The acquittal of Vento on a murder charge, and the light sentence handed out to Serrano, sparked more protests by the African-American community in Bensonhurst.

Shortly before that march was set to begin on January 12, 1991, Al Sharpton was stabbed and seriously wounded by Michael Riccardi in a Bensonhurst schoolyard. Sharpton later recovered from his wounds. Riccardi was convicted of first degree assault and sentenced to 5 to 15 years in prison, despite a plea for leniency by Sharpton himself, who believed that distorted news coverage of his activities had influenced his attacker.

Keith Mondello was said to be the "instigator and organizer" of the group and served eight years in prison. In 2005, former Gambino crime family member and mob informer Joseph D'Angelo admitted that the group behind Hawkins' murder was there on his orders to attack any blacks who entered the neighborhood. He also admitted he lied to police and asked a woman who knew many details to not tell police.

== Release of Mondello and Fama ==
After serving eight years in the Attica Correctional Facility, Keith Mondello was released on June 2, 1998. On January 22, 1999, Mondello and Hawkins' father, Moses Stewart, met in a NY1 television studio, where Mondello apologized for his role in the killing. Stewart died at the age of 48 in 2003. Fama did not become eligible for parole until 2022, when he was just over 50 years old. He was released on parole on July 29, 2025.

== Memorials and tributes ==
=== Art ===
- As of 2004, a faded mural painted soon after Hawkins' death was still visible on the side of a building on Verona Place in Bedford-Stuyvesant, Brooklyn. It was repainted in August 2011 by street artist Gabriel Specter.

=== Film/TV ===
- Spike Lee's film Jungle Fever (1991) is dedicated to the memory of Hawkins, and a photo of Hawkins appears at the beginning of the film.
- The 1998 film Blind Faith was dedicated to the memory of Hawkins.
- The HBO Documentary film Yusuf Hawkins: Storm Over Brooklyn which premiered August 12, 2020, directed by Muta'Ali Muhammad, "tells the story of how 16-year-old Yusuf was ... killed on August 23, 1989, by an Italian mob in Bensonhurst, Brooklyn, sparking protests and deep racial divide. The film was released on the 30th anniversary of this tragedy and features actual footage and interviews through archival footage to highlight the systemic racism that still exists today."

=== Music ===
- The lyrics for the song "Keep It in the Family" by Anthrax, included on their 1990 album Persistence of Time, was inspired by this event.
- The 1990 song "Welcome to the Terrordome" by Public Enemy includes a dedication to Hawkins.
- The song "Intro" on the album 1990 The Devil Made Me Do It by Paris includes a sample from a news broadcast referencing the shooting; the eleventh track on that same album, "The Hate That Hate Made", is also explicitly about the case.
- The song "The Gas Face (remix)" by 3rd Bass refers to Hawkins in the second verse.
- The song "Slipping into Darkness" by Queen Mother Rage was dedicated to Hawkins.
- Kool G Rap & DJ Polo's hit single "Erase Racism" (featuring Big Daddy Kane), from the 1990 album Wanted: Dead or Alive, references Hawkins, where Kane performs the second half of the song.
- Brand Nubian's "Concerto in X Minor," a song on their 1990 debut album, One for All, mentions Hawkins.
- The 1991 song "Treat 'Em Right" by Chubb Rock refers to Hawkins in the first verse: "In your hearts and mind never forget Yusef Hawkins."
- Tupac Shakur wrote a poem about Hawkins' death, "For Mrs. Hawkins." He also mentions him in the song "Tearz of a Clown" in the fourth verse.
- Double X Posse mentions Hawkins on their first album Put Ya Boots On (1992), on the album's second track "The Headcracker." The group provides a list of things that would be considered "headcrackers," or very shocking and upsetting. Among other things they mention, "Yusef Hawkins being murdered is a HEADCRACKER."
- The song "Snacks and Candy" (on the 1992 album Drenched) by the band Miracle Legion was written about this event.
- The song "Wrong Pot 2 Piss In" by The Goats on their 1992 debut album Tricks of the Shade, includes the line: "My man Rodney King would love a swing / and if Yusuf Hawkins was walkin' he'd say the same thing".
- The song "White Nigger" by Ill Bill, released in 2008, includes the line: "Had newsmen talking as a kid about Yusef Hawkins / Same age as me when Joey Fama caught him walking through Bensonhurst"
- The song "Learn Truth" by R.A. the Rugged Man, released in 2013, mentions Willie Turks, Michael Griffith, and Yusef Hawkins.
