= The Goddess and Other Women =

1974 collection of short fiction by Joyce Carol Oates

- First edition
- Author: Joyce Carol Oates
- Language: English
- Publisher: Vanguard Press
- Publication date: 1974
- Publication place: United States
- Media type: Print (hardback & paperback)
- Pages: 468
- ISBN: 978-0814907450

The Goddess and Other Women is a collection comprising 25 works of short fiction by Joyce Carol Oates and published by Vanguard Press in 1974.

== Stories ==
Those stories first appearing in literary journals are indicated.

- "A Premature Autobiography"
- "The Goddess" (Antaeus, Spring–Summer 1974)
- "Honeybit" (Confrontation, Fall 1974)
- "The Daughter" (entitled "Childhood" in Epoch, Spring 1967)
- "Magna Mater" (Antaeus, Spring–Summer 1974)
- "Ruth"
- "Unpublished Fragments"
- "Psychiatric Services"
- "The Girl" (limited edition by The Pomegranate Press, 1974)
- "The Wheel" (Epoch, Spring 1973)
- "Assault" (Review of Existential Psychology and Psychiatry, 1973)
- "Concerning the Case of Bobby T." (The Atlantic, February 1973)
- "Explorations" (Remington Review, October 1973)
- "I Must Have You" (Ohio Review, Spring 1973)
- "The Maniac" (Viva, October 1973)
- "... & Answers" (Family Circle, January 1973)
- "Narcotic" (Mademoiselle, October 1972)
- "A Girl at the Edge of the Ocean" (The Falcon, Spring 1972)
- "Small Avalanches" (Cosmopolitan, November 1972)
- "Blindfold" (Southern Review, Spring 1972)
- "Free" (Quarterly Review of Literature, 1971)
- "Waiting" (Epoch, Spring 1968)
- "In the Warehouse" (The Transatlantic Review, Summer 1967)
- "The Voyage to Rosewood" (Shenandoah, Summer 1967)

== Reception ==
Literary critic Marian Engel in the New York Times compares Oates favorably to the European masters of short fiction: "One or two of these stories are as good as James's and Conrad's. None of them is conventional or commercial, the 25 of them add up to a magnificent achievement."

Literary critic John Alfred Avant, writing in The New Republic, offers this a contrary assessment of the volume:

Oates at her worst. Of the 25 stories, three are acceptable...The charge is often made that Oates writes too quickly and too much; but the same working habits that produced The Goddess also produced her last two big collections, which contain, along with some tripe, some of the best stories in the language. Oates can't work in any other way. We have to take the mediocre with the good, the bad with the great.

== Critical analysis ==
While the stories in Marriages and Infidelities (1972) had dealt with love relationships and metaphorical marriages, the stories in this collection are unified by the fact that they are all portraits of different types of women.

Joanne V. Creighton points out that the title of this volume refers to the Hindu goddess Kali who appears in the story "The Goddess" as a statuette: "her savage fat-cheeked face fixed in a grin, her many arms outspread, and around her neck what looked like a necklace of skulls." Creighton also quotes from a letter by Oates in which she confirms that Kali is in fact the goddess implied in the collection's title.

Kali is a cruel goddess, the necklace of skulls has to be considered as a symbol of her destructiveness, and she is often depicted as feeding on the entrails of her lovers. Yet Creighton emphasizes that this destructiveness must not be overestimated and that the female characters in The Goddess and Other Women have to be regarded as complex and rather ambiguous figures:

But for all her terribleness, Kali is yet looked upon not as evil but as part of nature's totality: life feeds on life; destruction is an intrinsic part of nature's procreative process. So, rather than portraying women as our literary myths would have them - which, as Leslie Fiedler and others have pointed out, almost invariably depict women as either good or evil - Oates presents them as locked into the destructive form of Kali, unliberated into the totality of female selfhood.

Literary critic Greg Johnson regards The Goddess and Other Women "Oates's most overtly feminist collection of stories."

== Sources ==
- Engel, Marian. 1974. "Women also have dark hearts." New York Times, November 24, 1974. https://www.nytimes.com/1974/11/24/archives/the-goddess-and-other-women-by-joyce-carol-oates-468-pp-new-york.html Accessed 31 December 2024.
- Johnson, Greg (1994). Joyce Carol Oates: a study of the short fiction. Twayne's studies in short fiction. New York: Twayne publ. ISBN 978-0-8057-0857-8.
- Lercangee, Francine. 1986. Joyce Carol Oates: An Annotated Bibliography. Garland Publishing, New York and London. ISBN 0-8240-8908-1
- Oates, Joyce Carol (1992). The Goddess and Other Women. New York City: Vanguard Press. ISBN 978-0814907450.
