= Upon the Sweeping Flood =

Upon the Sweeping Flood may refer to:

- Upon the Sweeping Flood and Other Stories, a 1966 collection of short stories by Joyce Carol Oates
- Upon the Sweeping Flood (short story), a 1963 short story by Joyce Carol Oates
