= Magna Mater (short story) =

1974 short story by Joyce Carol Oates

- Short story by Joyce Carol Oates
- Country: United States
- Language: English

Publication
- Published in: Antaeus
- Publication date: Spring–Summer 1974

"Magna Mater" is a short story by Joyce Carol Oates originally published in Antaeus (Spring–Summer 1974) and first collected in The Goddess and Other Women (1974) by Vanguard Press.

The title refers to the Phrygian cult goddess Cybele, known in ancient Rome as Magna Mater, or "Great Mother".

== Plot ==
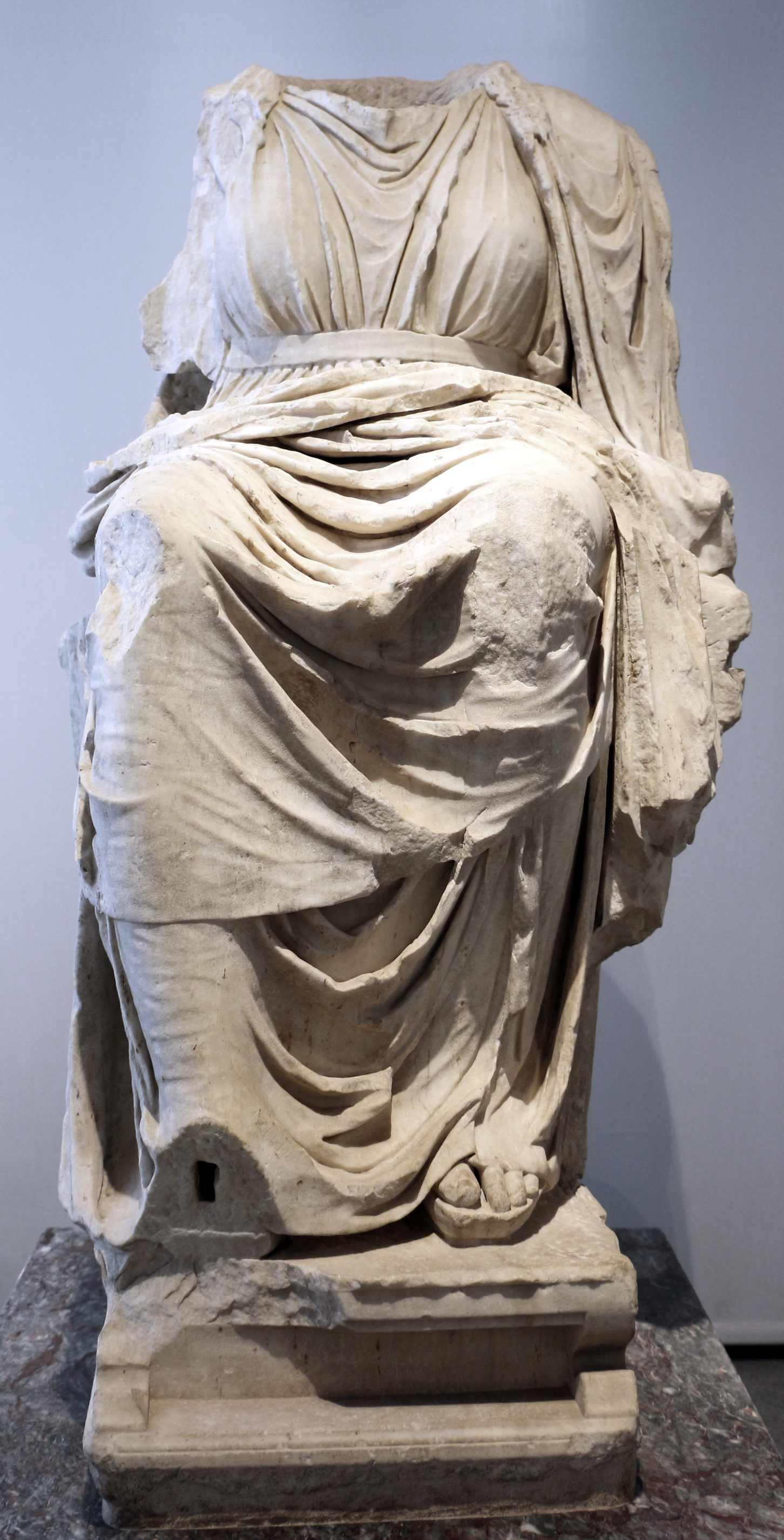
"Great mother of the Roman Empire" - Oates called her "the devouring female".

"Magna Mater" is presented as a third-person omniscient narrative.

Nora Drexler née Akenside, is a university professor at Radcliffe College. Though divorced for years, the 45-year-old Nora is still haunted by the injustice she feels at the disregard she has experienced from her now dying father, as well as her ex-husband. Nora is desperate to conceal her emotional vulnerability even to her counselor, Dr. Gruber, who was a fellow student at her university. She is ashamed that her husband, Theodore, has left her for a "newer…model", marrying a woman, 24-years-of-age. Nora regrets that she married a man "not quite her intellectual equal." She further laments that her highly regarded literary works were published under her married name rather than her maiden name.

Denny is her troubled son, age eleven. His I. Q. ranks in the "upper one-percentile." Dennis appears callous towards his dying grandfather, and mocks his mother's guilt. He demands that he be allowed to visit his grandfather in the hospital. Nora forbids it, concerned he will misbehave or "act strange." The obese boy is alternately needy and disparaging of his mother.

Nora is surprised by what appears to be a friendly visit by Mason Colebrook, a fellow professor of literature and his wife Sarah. Colebrook is mildly intoxicated. Chatting in her garden, Nora discovers she is the object of a scathing satire in verse. The author, Benjamin Edwards, once one of her students, has titled his poem "How Leda Got the Swan." Nora is instantly alarmed at the prospect of being humiliated, but conceals her panic. The content of the satire is not revealed. Colbrooke is secretly amused and delighted to inform her that she is now the target of a scurrilous retribution. He subtly reminds Nora that she'd sabotaged Edwards's career with crushing appraisals of his work. Nora reflects that Colbrooke may have disparaged her among their associates, but dismisses her suspicion.

When Colbrook asks Nora about her recent writings, she eagerly offers a defense of her work, attacking its critics. She launches into a diatribe against the decline of literacy in universities: "Unless we're courageous and fight these issues at once, we'll be teaching Pawnee bear songs before we know it."

Colbrook's contempt for Nora is now barely concealed, hidden by a veneer of mirth. Suddenly he begins to denounce Nora, making the bizarre claim that there is dust on the peanuts she has served him. Sarah is alarmed, and tries to apologize for her husband. Bewildered, Nora makes self-deprecating remarks about her social isolation. Colbrook, scooping up a handful of dirt, casts it in her face, and strides out of the garden.

Sarah follows him to the car, apologizing to Nora. When she nears Colebrook, he tells Sarah to stop placating their host: "Nora's the same ugly old selfish sadistic bitch she's always been…" The couple drive away.

Trembling with rage and humiliation, she comforts her son Dennis who has witnessed the incident. Nora promises not to abandon him.

== Reception ==
Writing in The New York Times, novelist and literary critic Marian Engel, reviewing the collection The Goddess and Other Women writes approvingly: "'Magna Mater' is my favorite, but there is no need to choose among them."

== Theme ==
The three male figures closest to Nora - her father, her husband, and her son - simultaneously demand her attention and resent her professional successes. Her university colleague's insults are particularly threatening to her "feminine ego", after her husband deserts her for a much younger woman.

To the extent that Nora is a "sadistic bitch", the appraisal is appropriately applied only to her selective critical analysis. Styling herself a reluctant but duty-bound champion of "academic excellence," Nora issues "blunt" and "devastating reviews" which amount to character assassinations of her male colleagues.

Biographer Joanne V. Creighton writes that, despite Nora's self-deceptions, these scathing reviews are expressions of a submerged but decided misandry:

She takes delight akin to the sadistic in destroying their opponent and in the process affirming her own superiority as a brilliant thinker…Intellectually if not sexually she has the upper hand, and it wields the castrating knife.

Creighton praises Oates for delivering a "balanced" portrait of Nora, but one that does not provide for her liberation as a woman: "Emotionally insecure, she is too entangled in unsatisfactory relationships with men and too vulnerable to their demands and taunts, praise and criticism, attention and inattention."

== Sources ==
- Creighton, Joanne V. 1979. Joyce Carol Oates Twayne Publishers, New York. Warren G. French, editor. ISBN 0-8057-7212-X
- Engel, Marian. 1974. "Women also have dark hearts." The New York Times, November 24, 1974. Accessed 31 December 2024.
- Johnson, Greg. 1994. Joyce Carol Oates: A Study of the Short Fiction. Twayne's studies in short fiction; no. 57. Twayne Publishers, New York. ISBN 0-8057-0857-X
- Oates, Joyce Carol. 1974. The Goddess and Other Women. Vanguard Press, New York. ISBN 978-0814907450
