= The Goddess (short story) =

- Short story by Joyce Carol Oates
- Country: United States
- Language: English

Publication
- Published in: Antaeus
- Publication date: Spring–Summer 1974

"The Goddess" is a short story by Joyce Carol Oates originally published in Antaeus (Spring–Summer 1974) and first collected in The Goddess and Other Women (1974) by Vanguard Press.

== Plot ==
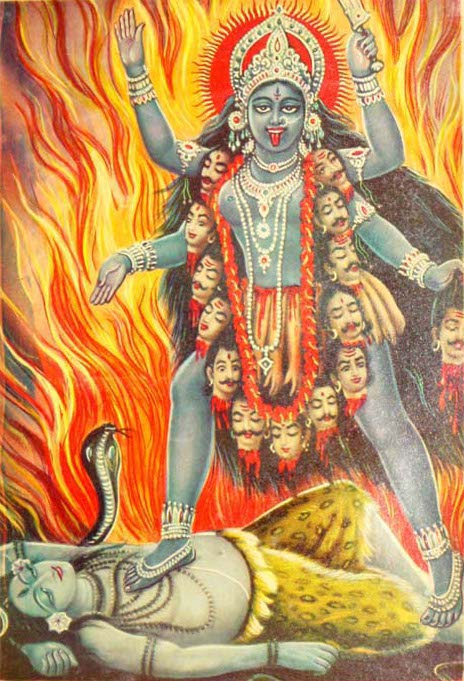
Modern depiction of the Hindu goddess Kali, shown standing atop Shiva, wearing a necklace of severed heads, in front of a fiery background (bazaar art, c.1940's)

The story is told from a third-person omniscient point-of-view, with the 43-year-old Claudia as the focal character.

Claudia and Alfred Buell, a well-to-do couple, have been married for twenty-three years. Claudia, though not particularly interested in her husband's professional contacts, has decided to accompany him on this business trip. They reserve the room they stayed at three years before in an upscale high-rise hotel in a major, but unnamed metropolis. Claudia is well-educated, an art connoisseur and collector. Lacking her sophistication, the 53-year-old Alfred defers to his wife on this subject. Unlike Claudia, he is a social reactionary, harboring misogynistic, racist and homophobic perspectives.

They walk downtown in the mercantile area where art galleries and adult book shops are mingled. Alfred scorns the latter, but Claudia, out of curiosity, lingers. She notes the district has deteriorated since their last visit. They are the only well-dressed couple on the boulevard. Passing the display window of a derelict auction house, Claudia's attention is drawn to a statuette of the Hindu goddess Kali. The grotesque goddess of death and destruction, repels her and she retreats. Moments later she and Alfred are accosted by an aggressive panhandler. The deranged young man threateningly demands a handout. The couple flee and take a cab to an exclusive restaurant.

When they return to their hotel, they discover their room has been burgled, but only Alfred's briefcase is missing. He instantly suspects the black porter who had carried their luggage to the room and received a tip; he curses blacks as a race. Albert calls the front desk in a rage, identifying the porter as the culprit. He calls the police when the hotel management defends his employee. During this confrontation, Claudia recollects the sordid encounter with the panhandler, the pot-bellied figurine, the smell of greasy french fries and pizza, and becomes nauseous. She rushed to the bathroom and vomited violently. Alfred confronts the suspect porter, who emphatically declares his innocence.

The incident traumatizes Claudia as it unfolds, and she begins to reflect on her life. She experiences a sense of self-hatred at her prettiness and her submissive consent to marry Alfred.

The time is 2:30 am. In a state of despair, Claudia descends the emergency staircase and discovers a pile of discarded dinnerware and leftover food. She has an impulse to throw the debris down the stairwell. At the elevator, she attempts to overturn a massive sand filled ashtray urn, but lacks the strength. She dumbfounds a black porter by offering him $50 to return her husband's briefcase. She returns to her hotel room to find her husband there with a young police officer. After a fruitless search of the premises again, they are left alone. The couple goes to bed at 3:30 pm. Alfred falls into a deep sleep. Claudia has disturbing fantasies in which the hotel is consumed in an apocalyptic fire - all the innocent people destroyed and the guilty survive.

Claudia recollects the two or three serious affairs she had as a single woman of which Albert knows nothing. She realizes that her social and marital status makes her "entirely innocent, entirely safe," conferring immunity from any petty crime she might commit: "No one knew her at all...she was really invisible."

== Theme ==
"The destructive forces of Kali are unleashed in Oates's stories when her woman's yearning for power, autonomy, and selfhood is frustrated or denied."—Literary critic Greg Johnson in Joyce Carol Oates: A Study of the Short Fiction (1994)

"Rather than portraying women as our literary myths would have them...Oates presents them as locked into the destructive form of Kali, unliberated into the totality of female selfhood."—Joanne V. Creighton in Joyce Carol Oates (1979)

The mythical goddess, whose presence is felt in all the stories, is Kali; she makes a corporeal appearance only in "The Goddess." When Claudia first encounters what appears to be a seemingly animated statue of the Hindu goddess Kali, she finds it both fascinating and offensive:

[I]t turned slowly into a figure of a woman, but she was standing with her legs apart, pot-bellied, naked, her breasts long and pointed, her savage fat-checked face fixed with a grin, her many arms outspread, and around her neck what looked like a necklace of skulls.

Claudia, directing her discontents against perceived social inferiors, begins to internalize the destructive characteristics of Kali. Literary critic Greg Johnson observes that, contrary to the protagonist's loathings "Oates makes clear that Claudia's rage stems from her dimly recognized entrapment in her severely delimiting social role" and the "soulless materialism" of her life. The story closes without revealing whether Claudia discovers a way out of her "cultural bondage."

Literary critic Marian Engel explains a key thematic facet in "The Goddess":

Joyce Carol Oates seems to know a great deal about the underside of America, to guide us—splendidly—down the dark passages and returns to tell us what we have known but never wanted to admit: women also have dark hearts.

== Sources ==
- Creighton, Joanne V. 1979. Joyce Carol Oates. Twayne Publishers, New York. Warren G. French, editor. ISBN 0-8057-7212-X
- Engel, Marian. 1974. "Women also have dark hearts." New York Times, November 24, 1974. https://www.nytimes.com/1974/11/24/archives/the-goddess-and-other-women-by-joyce-carol-oates-468-pp-new-york.html Accessed 31 December 2024.
- Johnson, Greg. 1994. Joyce Carol Oates: A Study of the Short Fiction. Twayne's studies in short fiction; no. 57. Twayne Publishers, New York. ISBN 0-8057-0857-X
- Oates, Joyce Carol. 1974. The Goddess and Other Women. Vanguard Press, New York. ISBN 978-0814907450
