= Small Avalanches =

- Short story by Joyce Carol Oates
- Country: United States
- Language: English

Publication
- Published in: Cosmopolitan
- Publication date: November 1972

"Small Avalanches" is a short story by Joyce Carol Oates originally published in Cosmopolitan (November 1972) and first collected in The Goddess and Other Women (1974) by Vanguard Press.

== Plot ==
"Small Avalanches" is presented from a first-person point-of-view.

The story unfolds during a summer afternoon in a remote rural district in Colorado. An only child, the thirteen-year-old Nancy spends her idle summer days wandering around the neighborhood. She loiters at her uncle Winfield's gas station and garage, hoping to observe the candy and soda pop machine owner arrive and service them. The effervescence of her Pepsi-Cola absorbs her; she reflects on which candy bar brand is her favorite. The uncle complains that Nancy's older cousin, Georgia, has been tying up the telephone all night with personal calls. He warns: "Georgia is a goddam little liar and if I catch her fooling around..." Nancy's interior monologue—which includes cursing—reveals the she and Georgia had recently hitched a ride with a stranger to a nearby town, a fact they both concealed from their parents.

An out-of-town stranger stops for gas. Friendly and talkative, the man reminds Nancy of her father. Bored, and disaffected by her uncle, Nancy walks towards home, discarding her empty soda pop bottle on the driveway. As she walks down the road, the vehicle slowly overtakes her. The man engages Nancy in conversation through the side window. He tells her that her uncle was displeased that she had left the bottle where it could cause a flat tire. Offering to give her a ride, Nancy instantly knows that his behavior deviates from local norms, and refuses. She finds him somewhat amusing. He begins to ask her personal questions, praising her good looks, but chiding her for not smiling more often.

Nancy turns down a footpath through mixed terrain and vegetation. The man declares that he needs some exercise, and exits the truck to join her. Nancy finds this absurd and laughs uncontrollably. The man follows. She stays a few paces ahead of her pursuer. He chides her for walking too fast. For a moment, Nancy feels she may be in danger. When she detects that the man is in physical distress from his exertions, she relaxes, and giggles. The man berates her as stumbles forward. Nancy kicks loose rocks that cascade down the hill, striking the man. He collapses, crawling on his hands and knees: "Don't leave me—I'm sick - I think I—" he whimpers. Nancy taunts him and leaves him to walk home. Upon her return, her mother puts Nancy to work ironing clothes. Nancy's demeanor remains that of an unperturbed and self-absorbed teenager.

== Theme ==
Two mythical goddesses dominate the themes in The Goddess and Other Women: Kali and Magna Mater, though only the former makes a corporeal appearance in the title story "The Goddess"—"The destruction powers of Kali are unleashed in Oates's stories" by female protagonists who are often prepubescent.

In "Small Avalanches", the twelve-year-old Nancy thwarts the advances of a child molester. Her aplomb provides for her defense and the near death of her pursuer, first reducing him to helplessness. Nancy maintains her composure in the aftermath of an encounter she views merely as a game, and without any signs of emotional trauma.

According to biographer Joanne V. Creighton, the story presents a preteen "toying exploitatively and dangerously with a sexuality [she does] not really understand". Creighton regards "Small Avalanches" less a cautionary tale on the dangers of girls talking to male strangers, but more so "that sex is an exciting and dangerous game where 'winning' is leading on the male and then frustrating him".

== Sources ==
- Creighton, Joanne V. 1979. Joyce Carol Oates. Twayne Publishers, New York. Warren G. French, editor. ISBN 0-8057-7212-X
- Engel, Marian. 1974. "Women also have dark hearts." New York Times, November 24, 1974. https://www.nytimes.com/1974/11/24/archives/the-goddess-and-other-women-by-joyce-carol-oates-468-pp-new-york.html Accessed 31 December 2024.
- Johnson, Greg. 1994. Joyce Carol Oates: A Study of the Short Fiction. Twayne's studies in short fiction; no. 57. Twayne Publishers, New York. ISBN 0-8057-0857-X
- Oates, Joyce Carol. 1974. The Goddess and Other Women. Vanguard Press, New York. ISBN 978-0814907450
