= Bear (novel) =

1976 novel by Marian Engel

- cover of the paperback edition, 1977
- Author: Marian Engel
- Language: English
- Genre: Fiction
- Published: 1976
- Publisher: McClelland & Stewart
- Publication place: Canada
- Pages: 141
- Awards: Governor General's Literary Award,1976 – Fiction, English
- ISBN: 9780771030802
- OCLC: 2507467

Bear is a novel by Canadian author Marian Engel, published in 1976. It won the Governor General's Literary Award the same year. It is Engel's fifth novel, and her most famous. The story tells of a lonely archivist sent to work in northern Ontario, where she enters into a sexual relationship with a bear. The Canadian Encyclopedia calls the book "the most controversial novel ever written in Canada".

== Background ==
The book was Engel's fifth novel, and her sixth piece of published writing. Engel studied under author Hugh MacLennan, finishing her Master's of Arts at McGill University in Montreal in 1957. Her first novel, No Clouds of Glory (later known as Sarah Bastard's Notebook), was released in 1968. She was awarded a Canada Council grant on the strength of the book, but had difficulty finding a publisher for her second novel, The Honeyman Festival. The book was published in 1970 by the new Toronto company House of Anansi Press, which would also put out another novel, Monodromos, and a collection of short stories, Inside the Easter Egg.

The novel was written in a busy and tumultuous period in the author's life, a "very crazy time" as described by Engel. In 1973, Engel had started the Writers' Union of Canada (W.U.C.) from her home, and served as its first chairperson. Through the W.U.C., and her position on the board of trustees for the Toronto Public Library, she advocated public lending rights for Canadian authors. She was raising twins while undergoing a painful divorce. She took regular psychotherapy sessions, and worried about her mental health. Engel would end up dedicating the book to John Rich, her therapist.

Engel started writing the novel to contribute to a W.U.C. collection of pornographic fiction by "serious" writers. The project was supposed to raise funds for the cash-strapped union, but did not make it to publication. Engel kept with her 31-page draft, and developed it into the 141-page novel. She was partly inspired by the First Nations legend of The Bear Princess, as recorded by folklorist Marius Barbeau. The story was suggested to the writer by the Haida artist Bill Reid. Early titles for the book included The Bear of Pennarth and The Dog of God. The book was rejected when first sent to publishers. An editor with Harcourt Brace wrote in a rejection letter: "Its relative brevity coupled with its extreme strangeness presents, I'm afraid, an insuperable obstacle in present circumstances." Fellow Canadian author Robertson Davies praised the book to McClelland & Stewart editors, and Engel started a lifelong friendship with company president Jack McClelland. The first printing was released in Toronto in May 1976.

== Synopsis ==
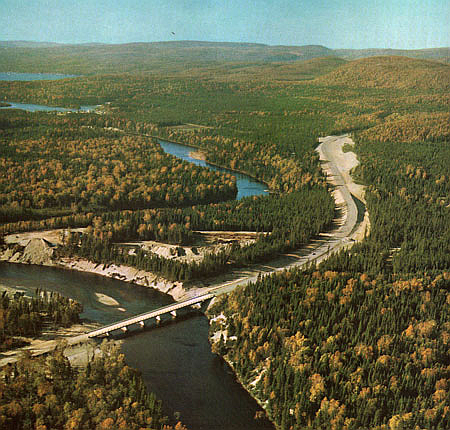
The landscape of Algoma District, at the crossing of the Michipicoten River by Ontario Highway 17

=== Setting ===
The book takes place in the district of Algoma in northeastern Ontario. The area is heavily wooded, with a mix of deciduous and conifer forests. Part of the Canadian Shield, the district has many lakes and rivers. Almost all of the story takes place in or around an old, octagonal house on a small island on a remote lake. The location, "Cary's Island" is fictitious, located north of Highway 17, past "Fisher's Falls" and near a village called "Brady".

The house and estate, previously belonging to the Cary family, whose patriarch fought in the Napoleonic Wars, is called "Pennarth" (Welsh for "Bear's head"). Its octagonal layout was inspired by the writings of Orson Squire Fowler, which dates the building to the 1850s. The house is well-ordered and elaborate, and houses an extensive library of 19th century books. Outside are several outbuildings, including a shed that houses a large, semi-tame bear.

=== Plot summary ===
The novel centers on Lou, a 27-year-old archivist given the task of documenting the house and library of Colonel Cary, which has been donated to her employer, the Heritage Institute. Escaping a dreary and unfulfilling life in Toronto, Lou revels in the opportunity to work in the solitude of Cary's Island. She studies and catalogues the library. Lou struggles with her emotional balance, and her relationship with her work. She slowly begins to approach the island's resident bear, who was a pet of the late Colonel.

Lonely and isolated, she becomes closer to the bear, aided by an elder Cree woman, Lucy Leroy. Lucy advises Lou on how to gain the animal's confidence. As she delves deeper into the library, she finds scraps of bear folklore and studies collected by the Colonel. Her relationship with the bear becomes sexual, as well as spiritual. She also enters into a sporadic sexual relationship with the estate's caretaker, Homer Campbell. As her work comes to a finish, the bear scratches her back deeply. Her bond with the bear is altered, and Lou leaves the island with a sense of renewal.

== Reception ==
The Canadian Encyclopedia notes that the book has been called "the most controversial novel ever written in Canada," and the notoriety around its subject matter brought Engel to national attention for the first time. At its publication, the novel was mostly received well by critics. Engel's writing craft was admired, with The Globe and Mail noting her "fine use of understatement, control, and economy." The book was received favorably outside of Canada as well; London's Times Literary Supplement wrote a positive review. Exceptions included novelist and critic Scott Symons, who called the book "spiritual gangrene ... a Faustian compact with the Devil." The 1976 Governor General's Literary Award jury, which included authors Margaret Laurence, Alice Munro, and Mordecai Richler awarded Bear its English-language Fiction award, one of the highest literary prizes in the country.

In 2014, the paperback cover became an Internet meme, thanks to a widely shared Imgur post titled "WHAT THE ACTUAL FUCK, CANADA?" This exposure led to a modern reappraisal of the 1970s novel, including new reviews, commentary, and a place in the Canadian Broadcasting Corporation's 2014 list "Books That Make You Proud to Be a Canadian." A 2014 National Post review by literature critic Emily M. Keeler called the book "the best Canadian novel of all time." Critic Aritha Van Herk, in an interview with CBC Radio's Q program, called the novel a "quintessential Canadian book," referencing the role of wilderness in Canadian lives.

== Publication history ==
McClelland & Stewart released the first edition in 1976. Atheneum Books released the first American edition. Several paperback editions were published by different imprints, including Seal and Pandora. The now-famous, Harlequin-like paperback cover depicts a partially nude woman being embraced by a large bear. Its artist was not credited in the book; later investigation concluded the illustration was likely by veteran cover illustrator Fred Pfeiffer. McClelland released a new edition under its "New Canadian Library" series in 1990 with an afterword by Aritha Van Herk. A more recent American edition licensed from Atheneum was published in 2002 by Godine with a subtly provocative wood-engraved illustration by Wesley Bates on the front cover and frontis, which has gone into 10 printings as of 2018. In August 2014, reacting to renewed interest in the novel, McClelland released a reprint of the New Canadian Library edition. Trying to avoid the sensationalism of the original paperback cover, Random House of Canada (which owns McClelland & Stewart) senior designer Five Seventeen designed several versions, finally deciding on a painting by American artist Mara Light. The painting depicts the back of a nude woman; the designer added scratch marks, evoking an episode from the novel where Lou is injured by the bear.
