= Norman and the Killer =

- Short story by Joyce Carol Oates
- Country: United States
- Language: English

Publication
- Published in: Southwest Review
- Publication date: Spring 1965

"Norman and the Killer" is a short story by Joyce Carol Oates originally published in Southwest Review (Spring 1965) and first collected in Upon the Sweeping Flood and Other Stories (1966) by Vanguard Press.

== Plot ==
The story is told from a third-person point-of-view, with the 31-year-old Norman as the focal character.

Norman is a mild-mannered and passive man who works as a salesman in a clothing store. He lives at home with his parents, but dreads spending his life in this domestic dependency. He is attracted to Ellen, a divorcee introduced to him by his brother-in-law and would like to marry her. She is noncommittal towards Norman.

When Norman pulls into a local gas station with Ellen, the station attendant pumping his gas looks familiar to him. When the man returns with his change, Norman is certain that he recognizes him. He cannot place the man in his memory, but during dinner at a restaurant, he becomes quietly agitated. While in the restroom, Norman grasps the significance of the man in his life, and suddenly feels liberated. He returns to Ellen with a new clarity of his circumstances.

The man, Norman is convinced, was one of three boys who assaulted him and his brother, Jack, on a waterfront sixteen years ago. At the time Jack was seventeen, Norman fifteen. They were beaten and thrown into the water - Jack was killed by a blow to the head. The perpetrators were never apprehended.

Only after encountering one of the murderers does Norman become obsessed with seeking justice for his brother. As such, his interest in Ellen diminishes as his sense of purpose in avenging Jack's death takes hold of him. Ellen discerns that Norman's behavior is unusual, but he dismisses her concern.

Meticulously planning his tactics, Norman drives to the gas station at its closing after dark. Norman forces the attendant at gunpoint to get into his car and makes him drive to a remote location. There they enter a shack, where Norman interrogates the man, asking him gently: "Where were you about sixteen years ago?" The man, frightened and dismayed at his situation, claims ignorance. Norman attempts to jog his memory: "Sixteen years ago you killed my brother." The suspect desperately asserts his innocence, and insists that he only wants to go home to his wife. Norman calls him a "Goddamn filthy liar."

During the night long ordeal, Norman condemns the man for denying him the love and support of his brilliant and devoted brother. Norman's actual opinion of his elder sibling in his youth judged Jack to be a nonentity who earned little respect from his younger brother.

Norman and his captive continue with the interrogation for hours into the night, the shack illuminated by a lantern. Exhausted in the early morning, Norman realizes that no confession is forthcoming and tells him he can go. As the man steps out the door, Norman is gripped with a spasm of outrage, and fires the gun. The man flees towards the forest, and Norman fires again; the victim falls to the ground. A surge of well-being passes through Norman: "[H]e felt the numbed, beatific emptiness of one who no longer doubts that he possesses the truth, and for whom life will forever have lost its joy."

== Theme ==
Norman's "freedom" only appears possible when he forsakes his "quiet, conventional, and unfulfilled life" for that of a vigilante intent on avenging his brother's murder.

The central irony is that Norman's emancipation permits him to construct an idealized image of his deceased older brother, voiding the historical truth: Norman had, in reality, despised his repellant brother. Biographer Joanne V. Creighton explains the function of Norman's delusional quest:

Norman needs to believe in his lost, ideal brother; it simplifies the complexities of life, takes the burden of guilt for his own shortcomings off of himself, and places on his brother's killer.

The "killer" in the story is Norman, and the person he liquidates is himself, and as such, "any potential communion with others."

Literary critic Greg Johnson regards the stories in the collection Upon the Sweeping Flood as "miniature allegorical dramas in which decent, bewildered people confront their own spiritual alienation, usually through epiphanies of emotional or physical violence." "Norman and the Killers" follows this allegorical formula, and like several other stories in the volume, the protagonist Norman "tries to order and fix experience through violence."

== Sources ==
- Creighton, Joanne V.. 1979. Joyce Carol Oates. Twayne Publishers, New York. Warren G. French, editor. ISBN 0-8057-7212-X
- Johnson, Greg. 1987. Understanding Joyce Carol Oates. University of South Carolina Press, Columbia, South Carolina. ISBN 0-87249-524-8
- Johnson, Greg. 1994. Joyce Carol Oates: A Study of the Short Fiction. Twayne's studies in short fiction; no. 57. Twayne Publishers, New York. ISBN 0-8057-0857-X
- Oates, Joyce Carol. 1966. Upon the Sweeping Flood. Vanguard Press, New York. . ISBN 0449224635
