= First Views of the Enemy =

- Short story by Joyce Carol Oates
- Country: United States
- Language: English

Publication
- Published in: Prairie Schooner
- Publication date: Spring 1964

"First Views of the Enemy" is a short story by Joyce Carol Oates originally published in Prairie Schooner (Spring 1964) and first collected in Upon the Sweeping Flood and Other Stories (1966) by Vanguard Press.

== Plot ==
"First Views of the Enemy" is written from a third-person point-of-view with Annette as the focal character.

Annette and her husband have bought a home in a semi-rural area. Both are just out of college, and the husband had thought it a more secure and healthy place to raise their six-year-old son, Timmy, than a city. Their home is adjacent to an agricultural district, and 15 miles from the small town and school.

The story opens as Annette and Timmy return from shopping. A bus that carries Mexican migrant agricultural workers to the fields is broken down on the side of the road. Men, women, and children are milling around. They greet the late model station wagon with mocking grins and jeers, yelling "Cadillac!" The encounter is disconcerting to Annette, and terrifying to Timmy. She lowers her window and asks to be let through, and finally sounds her horn. The pedestrians move aside, but a little boy throws a clod of dirt at the car. Annette is gratified to see a woman reprimand the child.

Troubled by the incident, Annette arrives home and reflects on her postpartum depression after Timmy's birth and her often anxious husband. She regrets abandoning her urban existence. Suddenly her home seems extremely vulnerable to assault. She locks the windows and doors. Rather than let her beautiful rose bushes be stripped by imaginary vandals, she takes a pair of shears and cuts dozens of the flowers, arranging them in vases indoors. The home is now more a fortress than a country home. Annette and Timmy make common cause and share a meal, united in their isolation.

== Theme ==
Literary critic Greg Johnson ranks "First Views of the Enemy" among the volume's best. The story satirizes "the grotesque self-delusions and perceptual distortions of affluent suburbanites."

Johnson writes: "For Oates, Annette is clearly emblematic of American materialism in her identification with her possessions, which in her paranoid fantasy could be attacked at any moment by the migrant workers." Oates dramatizes Annette's obsessions as follows: "In all directions her possessions stretched out about her, defining her, identifying her, and they were vulnerable and waiting, the dirt road led right to them."

Annette's anxiety is less that the migrant agricultural workers will attack her and take her precious possessions, but rather "Annette's own personal emptiness and the larger cultural wasteland it represents."

In alienating herself from the lives of the migrants in her community, Annette squanders opportunities for her personal growth, and condemns herself to "desperate isolation" in her suburban fortress.

Biographer Joanne V. Creighton assigns "First Views of the Enemy" to those works by Oates that exhibit "masterful control, precision, and economy of rendering, as well as thematic luminosity."

Creighton detects a motif in the appearance of red-colored objects - natural or manufactured - or references thereof: Human blood (or the thought of bleeding), red roses, red lawn furniture, and the red tarts that Annette and her six-year-old son Timmy eagerly consume as consolation for their self-imposed isolation.

The theme that emerges in "First Views of the Enemy" is one that is common to Oates's oeuvre : "The loneliness and isolation of the individual barred from emotional communion with others." Oates is particularly concerned with presenting characters who fail to objectively examine their experiences and, as such, never "gain any intellectual ascendancy over life's seeming meaninglessness."

== Sources ==
- Creighton, Joanne V. 1979. Joyce Carol Oates. Twayne Publishers, New York. Warren G. French, editor. ISBN 0-8057-7212-X
- Johnson, Greg. 1994. Joyce Carol Oates: A Study of the Short Fiction. Twayne's studies in short fiction; no. 57. Twayne Publishers, New York. ISBN 0-8057-0857-X
- Oates, Joyce Carol. 1966. Upon the Sweeping Flood. Vanguard Press, New York. . ISBN 0449224635
