= The Survival of Childhood =

- Short story by Joyce Carol Oates
- Country: United States
- Language: English

Publication
- Published in: Southwest Review
- Publication date: Spring 1964

"The Survival of Childhood" is a short story by Joyce Carol Oates originally published in Southwest Review (Spring 1964) and first collected in Upon the Sweeping Flood and Other Stories (1966) by Vanguard Press.

== Plot ==
Carl, the youngest child in a large and impoverished family, escapes from his rural home and achieves success academically as professor of literature at a large urban university. He holds his semi-literate parents and siblings in contempt. His memories dwell particularly on his brother Gene, four years his senior, an impulsive who engages in a knife fight with a local boy. Carl is daunted by and secretly resentful of Gene's fearlessness. In adulthood, Carl and Gene are at odds with one another. When Gene becomes obsessed with a dream of a woman and an old photograph of a girl, Carl doesn't know what to make of it. Gene takes life with his own hand.

== Theme ==
The theme of "The Survival of Childhood" resonates with the other works in the collection. According to literary critic Greg Johnson, "Virtually all the characters in these early stories are poor and inarticulate; their stories...have an uncanny power as dark fables of disillusionment and defeat".

Praising "The Survival of Childhood" as "potent", biographer Joanne V. Creighton locates the title of the story, in a negative sense, that the younger brother Carl is only in a false "survivor", while his elder brother Gene, in lieu of Carl, who serves as the "sacrificial victim".

When Carl enters the sanctum of Gene's bedroom after the latter's suicide, the artifacts reveal that he has utterly misapprehended the nature of Gene's inner life and social relationships. Creighton writes,

Carl realizes the extent of his own guilt, his failure to love and understand his brother. He has had, in truth, the ideal brother he thought that he had lost. For his brother had possessed a generosity of spirit that Carl both misunderstood and could not duplicate.

== Sources ==
- Creighton, Joanne V. 1979. Joyce Carol Oates. Twayne Publishers, New York. Warren G. French, editor. ISBN 0-8057-7212-X
- Johnson, Greg. 1987. Understanding Joyce Carol Oates. University of South Carolina Press, Columbia, South Carolina. ISBN 0-87249-524-8
- Johnson, Greg. 1994. Joyce Carol Oates: A Study of the Short Fiction. Twayne's studies in short fiction; no. 57. Twayne Publishers, New York. ISBN 0-8057-0857-X
- Oates, Joyce Carol. 1966. Upon the Sweeping Flood. Vanguard Press, New York. ISBN 0449224635
