= The Dead (Oates short story) =

- Short story by Joyce Carol Oates
- Country: United States
- Language: English

Publication
- Published in: McCall's
- Publication date: July 1971

"The Dead" is a short story by Joyce Carol Oates originally published in McCall's (July 1971), and first collected in Marriages and Infidelities (1972) by Vanguard Press. McCall's re-titled the story "The Death of Dreams" in its periodical, but its original title of "The Dead" was restored in the collection at Oates's request.

The story is a reworking of the 1914 short story by James Joyce. Oates's treatment is one of a number of works in Marriages and Infidelities that derive their narrative frameworks and themes from selected short fiction by Henry James, Anton Chekov and Franz Kafka.

"The Dead" established Oates as a writer in the feminist literary tradition.

== Plot ==
"The Dead" is told from a third-person point-of-view, with Ilena, 29-years-old when the story opens, as the focal character.

Ilena is a recent divorcee living in Buffalo, New York and teaching literature courses part-time at a Catholic university when the story opens. Set in the late 1960s, the political turmoil in America is at its height. She comes from a well-to-do and well-connected family, but is disaffected from most of her relatives, but like them, remains socially conservative. In order to cope, she self-medicates with prescription sedatives and stimulants on a daily basis mixed with alcohol. She is gaining a measure of fame with her novel Death Dance, a feminist work concerning a suicide club and female college students.

Ilena is carrying on an affair with one of her male colleagues, Gordon. Her husband suspects as much and expresses his disgust. Her lover is married with children, and they conduct their trysts in her campus office. They commiserate with one another about their unsatisfactory domestic affairs. Ilena suffers from the dilemma, unable to live happily with one man in her life, nor with two. She is increasingly alienated from her fellow professors, as well as her students. She is close only to one brilliant, difficult and demanding English major, Emmett.

Ilena is assigned as a co-examiner to hear a master's degree candidate in English to demonstrate his knowledge of literature. The 30-something Brother proves utterly ignorant of the topic, failing to provide simple definitions for "Tragedy" or "Gothic." When the principal examiners pass the candidate despite his obvious ineptitude, Ilena withholds her consent. For this defiance she is threatened with dismissal and resigns. Her rising literary career, however, sustains her financially, and she sells the rights to Death Dance, nominated for a National Book Award, to a film studio for $150,000. Barbiturates and amphetamines remain a daily part of her existence.

After leaving Buffalo, Ilena takes a new lover and literary critic, Lyle, a reformed alcoholic separated from his wife. Ilena confides in him her drug abuse, and he tells her "Drugs are suicidal, yes, but if they forestall the actual act of suicide they are obviously beneficial." When Lyle's wife discovers the affair, the couple are divorced. Ilena and Lyle plan to get married.

Now a literary celebrity, Ilena is invited back to the Catholic school for a reception in her honor as a former staff member. Now in her thirties, the medications are taking their toll on her physical appearance, which she struggles to conceal. She discovers that her student, Emmett, died recently during an anti-Vietnam war demonstration at the hands of the police. Ilena is deeply distressed by the news. At that moment, Gordon, her former lover, approaches and offers to drive her to her hotel. He knows that she will soon marry Lyle. He also reveals that Emmett was a heroin addict when he died.

In her hotel room, Gordon declares his love and Ilena submits to him when he begins to make love to her in the dark. Her mind wanders back to her ex-husband, to Emmett, and she begins to weep hysterically. A drug induced phantasmagoria develops in her mind, her body naked and exposed: "Lovers were kissing her on every inch of her body and trying to suck up her tepid blood...They were protoplasm that had the sickly pale formlessness of semen." Gordon tries to comfort her, but the image of Emmett appears; in her fantasies, she bitterly regrets not taking him as a lover. As she lay on the bed, the figures of her ex-husband, Gordon, and Emmett converge into one. Gordon asks her sympathetically, again and again "Do you want me to leave?" Ilena feels life ebbing from her brain and she is unable to reply.

== Retrospective appraisal ==
According to literary critic Greg Johnson, the most outstanding features of Marriages and Infidelities are its "use of allusion" and the examination of "literary tradition." The result is "the boldest and most ambitious" of Oates's short-story collections. Johnson adds that "The Dead" establishes Oates "within the context of a feminist literary tradition."

Biographer Joanne Creighton, observing that Oates has not achieved Joyce's "eloquence" in her re-imagining of the original work, her effort nonetheless resonates with "the lost souls of Joyce's Dubliners" (1914), and as such, "invites the reader to re-experience the Joycean world, while offering a contemporary version of it."

Critic Samuel F. Pickering compares the Oates version unfavorably to that of the original:

In Dubliners, Joyce not only made readers aware of the corruptions of religion but also that it adds, has added, and will to the citizens of Dublin. Miss Oates, on the other hand, seems content merely to describe the abuses of religion. Consequently her stories about Catholicism are often one-dimensional...

== Theme ==
The centrality of marriage to an individual's self-actualization is dramatized in "The Dead", and reflects Oates's understanding of the institution:

I believe we achieve our salvation, or our ruin, by the marriages we contract...Some are conventional marriages of men and women, others are marriages in another sense...something that transcends the limitation of the ego. But because people are mortal, most of the marriages they go into are mistakes of some kind, misreadings of themselves...

Oates adds: "I thought that by putting together a sequence of marriages [in the collection] one might see how this one succeeds and that one fails. And how this one leads to something beyond the self." This idealism is reflected in thoughts of female protagonist Ilena:

Marriage is the deepest, most mysterious, most profound exploration open to man: she always believed that, and she believed it now. Because she had failed did not change that belief. This plunging into another's soul, this pressure of bodies together, so brutally intimate, was the closest one could come to a sacred adventure; she still believed that.

Oates recognized Ilena as an alter ego, a doppelganger creation with which she closely identified. Literary critic William Abrahams places the story within the historical context during which Oates was writing:

Ilena, in her pill-sweetened descent from husband to lover to lover...is all too recognizably what she is - a casualty not only of marriage but of the decade that began in assassination and is ending in a seemingly never-ending war, whose strains and pressures find a counterpart in her own deterioration.

Noting that the story, like Joyce's, "reverberates with references to dead people and things," Creighton writes: "Ilena's book is entitled Death Dance. At parties, the assassination of President Kennedy, the waste of Vietnam, the death of the NAACP are mentioned."

=== Thematic parallel to Joyce's "The Dead" ===
The key thematic parallel between the two stories are the epiphanies that Joyce's protagonist Gabriel and Oates's Ilena experience before their demise: "Oates's story closely follows Joyce's in the final few pages."

Creighton offers passages from the works to illustrate how Oates's writing "echoes" that of Joyce in the moments before Ilena's death:

Oates: Ilena was conscious of something fading in her, in the pit of her belly. Fading. Dying. The central sexual organ is the brain, she had read, and now her brain is drawing away, fading, dissolving."

Joyce: [Gabriel's] own identity was fading out into a gray, impalpable world: the solid world itself, which these dead had one time reared and lived in, was dissolving and dwindling.

== Sources ==
- Abrahams, William. 1972. "Stories of a Visionary" Saturday Review, September 23, 1972. in Greg Johnson's Joyce Carol Oates: A Study of the Short Fiction. Twayne's studies in short fiction; no. 57, pp. 164–166. Twayne Publishers, New York. Greg Johnson, editor. ISBN 0-8057-0857-X
- Creighton, Joanne V. 1979. Joyce Carol Oates. Twayne Publishers, New York. Warren G. French, editor. ISBN 0-8057-7212-X
- Johnson, Greg. 1994. Joyce Carol Oates: A Study of the Short Fiction. Twayne's studies in short fiction; no. 57. Twayne Publishers, New York. ISBN 0-8057-0857-X
- Oates, Joyce Carol. 1972. Marriages and Infidelities. Vanguard Press, New York. ISBN 978-0814907184
- Pickering, Samuel F. 1974. "The Short Stories of Joyce Carol Oates," The Georgia Review, Vol. 28, No. 2 (Summer 1974) pp. 218–226. https://www.jstor.org/stable/41397080 Accessed 30 December 2024.
- Showalter, Elaine. 1988. "Joyce Carol Oates 'The Dead' and Feminist Criticism" from Faith of a (Woman) Writer (1988), Greenwood Press, in Greg Johnson's Joyce Carol Oates: A Study of the Short Fiction. Twayne's studies in short fiction; no. 57, pp. 167–170. Twayne Publishers, New York. Greg Johnson, editor. ISBN 0-8057-0857-X
- Spence-Ash, Laura. 2017. Fiction Responding to Fiction: James Joyce and Joyce Carol Oates. Ploughshares, March 13, 2017. https://pshares.org/blog/fiction-responding-to-fiction-james-joyce-and-joyce-carol-oates/ Accessed 24 December 2024.
