= The Voyage to Rosewood =

1967 short story by Joyce Carol Oates

- Short story by Joyce Carol Oates
- Country: United States
- Language: English

Publication
- Published in: Shenandoah
- Publication date: Spring 1967

"The Voyage to Rosewood" is a short story by Joyce Carol Oates originally published in Shenandoah (Spring 1967) and first collected in The Goddess and Other Women (1974) by Vanguard Press.

== Plot ==
"The Voyage to Rosewood" is presented in a first-person confessional by Marsha, the 16-year-old protagonist.

Marsha lives in a rural district and is bused to school. Her parents are working-class but impoverished, and she is acutely aware of her class inferiority with the affluent city youth who attend her high school. An awkward and sensitive girl - she only uses swear words to herself - Marsha is disaffected and wishes to break free of her tedium of her provincial existence. Her relationship with her parents is "precarious...no one must tamper with it..."

She impulsively cuts school and takes a greyhound bus north, destination unknown, and spending most of her small fund of money on the fare. She gets off in the small town of Remus. Wandering about, Marsha is assumed to be a truant or runaway by her looks: she is not dressed for the winter weather. She enters a tavern to get warm. When the bartender asks her how old she is, Marsha responds with false bravado "none of your business", eliciting an amused chuckle from the clientele. She is casually accosted by a tall man in his early twenties named Ike. He is idle and unemployed. His teasing interrogation cuts through her lie that her name is "Linda" and on her way to a nearby town of Shepherd to take a job as a housekeeper. The two are ordered out of the tavern, and she accepts Ike's offer to give her a drive.

The passenger side door of his car is broken so she must enter and exit on the driver side. On the way they pick up Ike's sidekick, Henry, and the boys alter their destination to the town of Rosewood. Ike begins to bully the passive Henry, who is sitting in the middle. Punching him in the shoulder, he orders him to make friends with Marsha and kiss her. Henry demurs. Ike's predatory sexuality begins to emerge: he asks Marsh what her lipstick tastes like. She is not yet alarmed by her situation. The trio stops at a motorcycle repair shop and Ike goes in. Marsha exits the car to finds that the temperature has dropped precipitously. She wanders through an industrial district, terrified of the approaching snow storm. Suddenly Ike approaches her, running in a rage. He berates her for leaving him and slaps her face. Checking to see if anyone else is watching, Ike administers Marsha a vicious beating with his fists, tearing at her clothing and hair, then flees.

At the police station, Marsha is interrogated by the authorities as to what she was doing in town. Marsha, convinced that "men like tomboyish girls," she feigns indifference to her bloody injuries. Her father is notified and arrives that evening, sickened that the police officers will disparage him for raising a wayward daughter. After Marsha gets into her father's car, he slaps her in the face and sobs plaintively "Why did you do this to us?"

== Theme ==
"It is only through disruption and confusion that we grow, jarred out of ourselves by the collision of someone else's private world with our own." - Joyce Carol Oates from "Fictions, Dreams, Revelations", introduction to Scenes from American Life: Contemporary Short Fiction (1973).

"The Voyage to Rosewood" is representative of the stories in the collection The Goddess and Other Women "depicting a teenage girl on the brink of existential self-definition". The sixteen-year-old Marsha is on the threshold of her sexual identity. She is faced with defining herself either as a chaste and devoted child to her parents, or asserting her autonomy by entering into a social encounter with a predatory male stranger. Biographer Joanne V. Creighton writes:

Oates captures very well that point in adolescence when a girl begins to be aware of herself sexually, when she makes tentative groping out to the world beyond childhood.

Literary critic Greg Johnson points out a key thematic element in the story, equating the youthful male perpetrators, who exhibit sado-masochist tendencies, and the girls father, all of whom abuse the girl.

Even parental love is marked by an obsessive need for control that, when threatened, causes male characters to revert to weak "effeminate" behavior.

Johnson notes the Oates requires a reckoning for such agency on the part of girls: "Clearly, as Oates teenagers exert their natural youthful energy in gestures of autonomy or defiance"; the result invokes the intervention of the mythical Kali, inflicting punishment indiscriminately.

== Sources ==
- Creighton, Joanne V. 1979. Joyce Carol Oates. Twayne Publishers, New York. Warren G. French, editor. ISBN 0-8057-7212-X
- Johnson, Greg. 1994. Joyce Carol Oates: A Study of the Short Fiction. Twayne's studies in short fiction; no. 57. Twayne Publishers, New York. ISBN 0-8057-0857-X
- Oates, Joyce Carol. 1974. The Goddess and Other Women. Vanguard Press, New York. ISBN 978-0814907450
