= The Girl (short story) =

- Short story by Joyce Carol Oates
- Limited edition cover
- Illustrator: Karyl Klopp
- Country: United States
- Language: English

Publication
- Publisher: The Pomegranate Press
- Media type: Print (paperback)
- Publication date: 1974
- Pages: 34

"The Girl" is a short story by Joyce Carol Oates originally published as a limited edition by The Pomegranate Press in 1974, and first collected in The Goddess and Other Women (1974) by Vanguard Press.

== Plot ==
"The Girl" is told in a first-person narration by the protagonist identified only as "The Girl," as if she were only a character listed in movie credits. The story is presented in six sections recounting the making of a pornographic film, as listed below:

=== Background Material ===
The Girl is introduced to the men who are making the film; she is uncertain as to the name of the director, who is known simply as The Director. He is on a short schedule, as the filmmaking equipment is borrowed and must be returned shortly. The director, "very excited" has a "vision" for his cinematic work. The 250 pound man named Robbay plays opposite The Girl as "The Motorcyclist"; the motorcycle isn't running, serving merely an inert prop. A boy plays "The Cop" (he wears a tin badge from a novelty shop). She has no idea what the true identity of these men are. They ogle her and praise her suitability for the role. The Girl's skimpy and colorful costume "came from a Miss Chelsea Shop in Van Nuys. I wasn't wearing anything else, anything underneath." The film is shot in black-and-white. The production is clearly underfunded and slipshod.

=== The Rehearsal ===
The Director and his actors arrive at The Beach, an isolated stretch of California coastline and prepare the scene. Robbay is revealed as a vegetarian and a weightlifter. The Director walks The Girl through the improvised set - a row of stones. He caresses The Girl, praises her beauty and pontificates on his own artistry and his vision for a "tiny eight-minute poem."The Director repeatedly warned The Girl "not to resist" during the shooting.

=== The Performance ===
The section is presented as a stream-of-consciousness in which The Girl is directed to run, faster and faster, as she is pursued by her co-stars. She becomes disoriented, "being hammered being hammered all at once...Something being pounded into flesh like meat."

=== A Sequel ===
The Girl is in a hospital. A nurse is checking her pulse. The girl is traumatized. Did the police find them, the girl wants to know? Was the movie shown? Some of her hair has been torn out, her scalp bleeding. A man who she doesn't recognize tells her that the police don't care if the perpetrators are caught. He proceeds to interrogate her; she is unable to identify her assailants.

=== The Vision ===
The season is now winter, and The Girl is walking down a familiar street. She spots The Director in the distance and begins to pursue him. She stops him and demands to know if he recognizes her; he stares at her, feigning incomprehension, claiming he is from out of town. When he discerns that the girl is desperate to know if she was actually in a film, he acknowledges her with a smile: "Honey oh yeah. Yeah. Don't you ever doubt that...You know what I mean. The Vision." He affirms The Girl's self worth, "So I was saved."

== Theme ==
"The Girl" sets the tone for the stories in The Goddess and Other Women. The title itself suggests that "individual women are reduced to gender-based roles."

The unnamed female protagonist deludes herself that she is contributing to a work of cinematic art. As such, she submits to a sexual assault, and in its aftermath, seeks to confirm that the film was genuine: "[S]he is so desperate for identity that her major concern in seeking the rapist's capture is her need to know that it was a 'real movie'"

Literary critic Greg Johnson registers a sharp rebuke to fellow critic Mary Kathryn Grant's assessment that "what is finally disconcerting about Oates's women is that they are weak, spiritually impoverished, devoid of beauty, morally bankrupt - in a word, unfeminine." Johnson declares that Oates's characterizations of women in these stories "reflects the very cultural conditions that Oates is indicting."

Most of the women are not weak, but disenfranchised; not spiritually impoverished, but viewed as lacking the full humanity necessary to "spirituality'; not devoid of beauty, but made ugly by molestation and violence...

Johnson adds that any "moral bankruptcy" attributed to these female characters is a measure of their social designations, which limit them to "the status of madonnas, muses, or whores."

Biographer Joanne V. Creighton observes that Oatesian females "become disenchanted with their emptiness and reach out for some confirmation of their being." The insult and injury the girl endures is an indication that she possesses "no selfhood." Oates's conclusion is that some women have an "unlimited capacity for self-abnegation and the dedication to men..."

== Sources ==
- Creighton, Joanne V. 1979. Joyce Carol Oates. Twayne Publishers, New York. Warren G. French, editor. ISBN 0-8057-7212-X
- Grant, Mary Kathryn. 1987. The Tragic Vision of Joyce Carol Oates. Duke University Press, Durham, North Carolina. ISBN 978-0082230403
- Johnson, Greg. 1994. Joyce Carol Oates: A Study of the Short Fiction. Twayne's studies in short fiction; no. 57. Twayne Publishers, New York. ISBN 0-8057-0857-X
- Oates, Joyce Carol. 1974. The Goddess and Other Women. Vanguard Press, New York. ISBN 978-0814907450
