= Stigmata (short story) =

- Short story by Joyce Carol Oates
- Country: United States
- Language: English

Publication
- Published in: Colorado Quarterly
- Publication date: Spring 1963

"Stigmata" is a short story by Joyce Carol Oates originally published in Colorado Review (Spring 1963) and first collected in Upon the Sweeping Flood and Other Stories (1966) by Vanguard Press.

== Plot ==
"Stigmata" is written from a third-person point-of-view, with Walt as the focal character.

Mr. Turner, a patient at St. Jerome's Home for the elderly, has announced that on Good Friday next, he will experience his apotheosis. He predicts that the stigmata will appear on his hands and feet, causing them to bleed. The six children of Mr. Turner are summoned as are church officials and the press. The old man is almost worshipped by his offspring, especially Clara. She is desperate to affirm her faith in her father. One son, Walt, is the exception. A lapsed Catholic, he is deeply skeptical not only of the event, but of his father's saintliness, or indeed, his honesty.

Mr. Turner begins to manifest the stigmata, as predicted, but on Thursday, rather than Friday. Moreover, the bleeding continues until Easter Sunday, contrary to scripture and the promised miracle.

The story ends with Turner exposed as a fraud.

== Theme ==
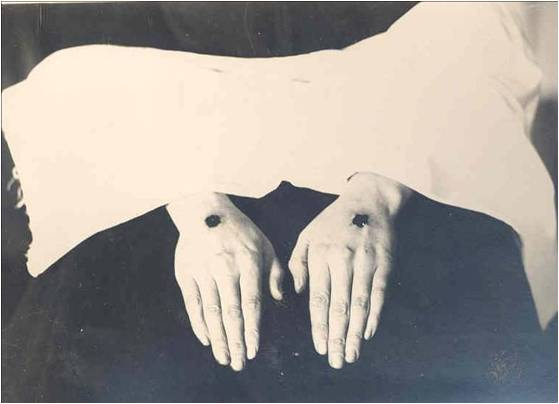
Stigmatisation

Literary critic Greg Johnson considers "Stigmata" an allegorical treatment where Oates invokes her "inherited Catholicism to explore the human need to create a rigidly structured orthodoxy as a defense against natural chaos."

Mr. Turner, in his attempt to demonstrate his purported apotheosis, instead exposes his own bankruptcy as a father and gives the lie to his "mask of benevolence and calm." Biographer Joanne V. Creighton places the following passage at the center of Oates's thematic purpose, condemning Turner for his adamant self-complacency:

Safe in his old age, before that safe in his tranquility, he has refined himself out of life - he had had, so easily, six children; he had given them nothing, not his own identity, not identities of their own, he had not distinguished one from another…he had never been a man; and he was being educated now in the pain of being human."

His son Walt, in witnessing his father's failure to publicly establish his sainthood, recognizes that "his father is being designated a sinner, not a saint, being punished for his lifelong detachment from the world."

Critic Samuel F. Pickering approves of Oates's exposure of the Catholic stigmata:

The stories describing the effects of Catholicism or Catholic institutions are better. Still the same lonely people that wander through the halls of ivy league find their way to the transept. Describing the death of an old man suffering from the stigmata of the effect of the "miracle" on his family brutally exposes the inhuman beneath institutional religion.

== Sources ==
- Creighton, Joanne V.. 1979. Joyce Carol Oates. Twayne Publishers, New York. Warren G. French, editor. ISBN 0-8057-7212-X
- Johnson, Greg. 1994. Joyce Carol Oates: A Study of the Short Fiction. Twayne's studies in short fiction; no. 57. Twayne Publishers, New York. ISBN 0-8057-0857-X
- Oates, Joyce Carol. 1966. Upon the Sweeping Flood. Vanguard Press, New York. ISBN 0449224635
- Pickering, Samuel F. 1974. "The Short Stories of Joyce Carol Oates" The Georgia Review, Vol. 28, No. 2 (Summer 1974) pp. 218–226. The Short Stories of Joyce Carol Oates Accessed 30 December 2024.
