= Extenuating Circumstances (disambiguation) =

Extenuating circumstances, or a mitigating factor, in criminal law, is information or evidence that might result in reduced charges or a lesser sentence.

Extenuating Circumstances may also refer to:

- Extenuating Circumstances (film), a 1939 French comedy
- Extenuating Circumstances: Stories of Crime and Suspense a 2022 short story collection by Joyce Carol Oates
