= Where I Lived, and What I Lived For =

Where I Lived, and What I Lived For may refer to:

- "Where I Lived, and What I Lived For", the second chapter of Henry David Thoreau’s Walden
- "Where I Lived, and What I Lived For", a reimagining of Thoreau's work mentioned above, by Joyce Carol Oates
