= The Lady With the Pet Dog =

"The Lady with the Pet Dog"
- Short story by Joyce Carol Oates
- Country: United States
- Language: English

Publication
- Published in: Partisan Review
- Publication date: Spring 1972

"The Lady with the Pet Dog" is a short story by Joyce Carol Oates originally published in Partisan Review (Spring 1972) and first collected in Marriages and Infidelities (1972) by Vanguard Press.

The story is a reworking of the 1899 short story "The Lady With the Dog" by Anton Chekhov. Oates's story takes place in contemporary America on Nantucket, rather than Chekhov's Yalta in Czarist Russia.

== Plot ==
"The Lady With the Pet Dog" is told from a third-person point-of-view, with Anna as the focal character. Anna is a 32-year-old woman married to a man 10 years her senior. She has an affair with a married man who has a physically disabled boy. Neither men are identified by name. The story is presented in three sections, though not chronologically.

=== Section 1 ===
This section opens in medias res, in which Anna's former lover travels to her town and confronts her silently at a classical music concert she attends with her husband. The secret lovers have not seen each other or communicated for six months since their tryst in Nantucket; the affair was presumed over. She swoons and is escorted home by her spouse who suspects nothing. Anne's husband, though he adores her, no longer satisfies her emotional needs.

=== Section 2 ===
This section describes the parting of Anna and her lover after the brief Nantucket affair. He drives her to Albany, New York for her flight home to Ohio. Anna is conflicted as to her feelings. She secretly experiences shame, and doubts that he loves her: "[S]he did not really trust him. She did not really trust men." She weeps on their parting.

Anna resumes her role as wife in Ohio. Her husband is absorbed in his own affairs concerning business, his health, and his ailing mother. Anne feels she must submit: "This is fate" she muses, and assures herself that she is free from her summer attachment. Shortly thereafter "she drew a razor blade lightly across the inside of her arm, near the elbow, to see what would happen." Surviving the suicide attempt, she is shocked at the appearance of her lover at a concert; her life is again plunged into crisis. Anna hopes that she can drive him away and resume her domestic existence. A phone call from him thrusts her back into the relationship. They embark on a series of trysts at various motels in town. Anna becomes disillusioned with the affair and turns against her lover and suddenly has homicidal fantasies of being rid of him: "Oh, I will follow you back [to Long Island] and kill you. You and [your wife] and your little boy. What is there to stop me?" She leaves him.

=== Section 3 ===
This section details Anna's first meeting with her lover and the unfolding of their attachment for one another. A writer, he resides with his wife on Long Island and is on a brief holiday with his blind 9-year-old son to their Nantucket summer cottage - sans wife. Anna is on a solitary sojourn at her family's old cottage next door. Reading on the beach, she slowly becomes aware of the man, his son, and their pet golden retriever. When he approaches her, she smiles. After a few introductory words, he sits near her and begins to draw several charcoal portraits of Anna. She is intrigued, and allows him to proceed. He expertly conveys Anna's appearance: a pretty woman in her early thirties, her hair tied by a scarf. He offers her the one she likes most; Anna takes the portrait with the young dog resting in her lap. "Lady with pet dog" he remarks. They enjoy an intimate dinner at a local restaurant, after which they take a long walk along the beach. Anna is fully aware of her marital status and that this man has children, yet she reflects: "This is the hour in which everything is decided." They sleep together that night at her beach house. Anna is skeptical that this can lead to anything, although she feels love, but is plagued by her knowledge that she has committed adultery: "[A]n accomplishment she would take back to Ohio and to her marriage."

Back home, she secretly looks at her summer portrait with the pet dog, and she is conflicted as to whether she loves him or her husband who, devoted to her, may love her better. The narrative returns to the narrative in Section 2: Confused and confused over the future or her relationship with her lover, she has an epiphany at the moment they prepare to part forever. Anna grasps, with perfect moral certainty, that the lover was her true life mate: "It was obvious to her that she had, all along, been behaving correctly; out of instinct."

== Comparison to Chekhov's "The Lady with the Dog" ==
Oates's "The Lady with the Pet Dog" is one of a number of her "reimagined" stories that represent explicit tributes to the masters of the short story form, in this instance Anton Chekhov's The Lady with the Dog (1899). Oates shifts the narrative to the point-of-view of the female protagonist, rather than the male in Chekhov's original. A number of details regarding the lives of the characters are changed, though "the two stories are nearly identical in theme and basic outline." Biographer Joanne V. Creighton regards Oates's "The Lady with the Pet Dog" as little more than a skillfully rendered exercise in transposition: "Her story is effective, but in the same way that Chekhov's is." Literary critic Greg Johnson provides the final passages from both the Chekhov tale and Oates's rendering of the classic work for contrast and comparison. Johnson reminds readers that the Oates version is told from Anna's point-of-view rather than her male lover and as such "forces the reader to share Anna's experience." Chekhov's story concludes:

And it seemed as though in a little while the solution would be found, and then a new and glorious life would begin; and it was clear to both of them that the end was still far away, and that what was to be the most complicated and difficult for them was only just beginning.

Oates ends her story with an intimate exchange that also suggests a new future for the embattled couple:

"Why are you so happy? What's wrong? he asked, startled. He stared at her. She felt the abrupt concentration in him, the focusing of his vision on her, almost a bitterness in his face, as if he feared her. What, was it beginning all over again? Their love beginning again, in spite of them? "How can you look so happy?" he asked. "We don't have any right to it. Is it because...?"
"Yes," she said.

Johnson notes that "Oates ingenious narrative structure" provides for Anna's ultimate self-realization and her emphatic affirmation: "Yes."

== Sources ==
- Creighton, Joanne V. 1979. Joyce Carol Oates. Twayne Publishers, New York. Warren G. French, editor. ISBN 0-8057-7212-X
- Johnson, Greg. 1994. Joyce Carol Oates: A Study of the Short Fiction. Twayne's studies in short fiction; no. 57. Twayne Publishers, New York. ISBN 0-8057-0857-X
- Oates, Joyce Carol. 1972. Marriages and Infidelities. Vanguard Press, New York. ISBN 978-0814907184
