= Marriages and Infidelities =

1972 collection of 25 works of short fiction by Joyce Carol Oates

- First edition
- Author: Joyce Carol Oates
- Language: English
- Genre: Short story collection
- Publisher: Vanguard Press
- Publication date: 1972
- Publication place: United States
- Media type: Print (hardback)
- Pages: 497
- ISBN: 978-0814907184

Marriages and Infidelities is a collection of 25 works of short fiction by Joyce Carol Oates published by Vanguard Press in 1972.

The volume is Oates's fourth collection of short stories.

== Stories ==
Journal and date of original publication provided after each title.

- "The Sacred Marriage" (The Southern Review, Summer 1972)
- "Puzzle" (Redbook, November 1970)
- "Love and Death" (Atlantic Monthly, June 1970)
- "29 Inventions" (The Antioch Review, Fall/Winter 1970–71)
- "Problems of Adjustment in Survivors of Natural/Unnatural Disasters" (Boston Review, Spring 1972)
- "By the River" (December, December 1968)
- "Extraordinary Popular Delusions" (Virginia Quarterly Review, Spring 1972)
- "Stalking" (The North American Review, June 1972)
- "Scenes of Passion and Despair" (Shenandoah, Summer 1971)
- "Plot" (The Paris Review, Summer 1971)
- "The Children" (The Transatlantic Review, January 1969)
- "Happy Onion" (The Antioch Review, January 1971)
- "Normal Love" (Atlantic Monthly, January 1971)
- "Stray Children" (Salmagundi, Winter 1971)
- "Wednesday's Child" (titled "Wednesday" in Esquire, August 1970)
- "Loving Losing Loving...a Man" (The Southern Review, Autumn 1971)
- "Did You Ever Slip on Red Blood?" (Harper's Magazine, April 1972)
- "The Metamorphosis" (titled "Others' Dreams" in The New American Review, November 1971)
- "Where I Lived and What I Lived For" (Virginia Quarterly Review, Autumn 1970)
- "The Lady With the Pet Dog" (The Partisan Review, Spring 1972)
- "The Spiral" (Shenandoah, Winter 1969)
- "The Turn of the Screw" (The Iowa Review, Spring 1971)
- "The Dead" (McCall's, July 1971)
- "Nightmusic" (Mundus Artium Journal, July 1972)

== Reception ==
Literary critic William Abrahams, in Saturday Review, regards the collection as evidence placing Oates "among the most remarkable writers of her generation" and "a master" of the short story form. Abrahams praises the work for its "emotional effectiveness and intellectual credibility."

Critic Michael Wood in The New York Times finds the stories in the collection "full of melodrama and yet curiously dull," evidence of a writer "racking her brains for action, wanting to write even in the absence of anything to write about." Wood reports that there are several good stories in the volume - with special mention for "Problems of Adjustment in Survivors of Natural/Unnatural Disasters" - and offers this caveat:

But the successes make the failures seem self-indulgent...Oates is groping, then, for themes and forms in far too much of this book. But even her groping is worth looking at, reveals returning preoccupations that will surely blossom into better work.

== Critical appraisal ==
"It is only through disruption and confusion that we grow, jarred out of ourselves by the collision of someone else's private world with our own.—Joyce Carol Oates from "Fictions, Dreams, Revelations," introduction to Scenes from American Life: Contemporary Short Fiction (1973).

Joyce Carol Oates's fourth collection of short stories is remarkable because of two aspects. First, some stories have the same titles as short stories or novellas by earlier writers: "The Metamorphosis" hints at Franz Kafka's short story "Die Verwandlung", "The Lady with the Pet Dog" at Anton Chekhov's novella "Die Dame mit dem Hündchen," "The Turn of the Screw" at Henry James's novella of the same title, and "The Dead" at the last short story of James Joyce's Dubliners. Oates has explained: "These stories are meant to be autonomous stories, yet they are also testaments of my love and extreme devotion to these other writers; I imagine a kind of spiritual 'marriage' between myself and them ...."

Secondly, although the title suggests stories about marriages, about the traditional form of man-woman relationship and about its problems, Oates also uses the term "marriage" as a metaphor, as she has stated:

I believe we achieve our salvation, or our ruin, by the marriages we contract. I conceived of a book of marriages. Some are conventional marriages of men and women, others are marriages in another sense - with a phase of art, with something that transcends the limitations of the ego. But because people are mortal, most of the marriages they go into are mistakes of some kind, misreadings of themselves. I thought by putting together a sequence of marriages, one might see how this one succeeds and that one fails. And how this one leads to some meaning beyond the self.

== Sources ==
- Abrahams, William. 1972. "Stories of a Visionary" Saturday Review, September 23, 1972. Retrieved 10 October 2023.
- Johnson, Greg. 1994. Joyce Carol Oates: A Study of the Short Fiction. Twayne's studies in short fiction; no. 57. Twayne Publishers, New York. ISBN 0-8057-0857-X
- Lercangee, Francine. 1986. Joyce Carol Oates: An Annotated Bibliography. Garland Publishing, New York and London. ISBN 0-8240-8908-1
- Oates, Joyce Carol. 1972 Marriages and Infidelities. Vanguard Press, New York. ISBN 978-0814907184
- Wood, Michael. 1972. "Diminished People" in The New York Times, October 1, 1972. https://www.nytimes.com/1972/10/01/archives/marriages-and-infidelities-short-stories-by-joyce-carol-oates-497.html Retrieved 5 October 2023.
