= Nightmusic (short story) =

- Short story by Joyce Carol Oates
- Country: United States
- Language: English

Publication
- Published in: Mundus Artium
- Publication date: July 1972

"Nightmusic" is a short story by Joyce Carol Oates originally published in Mundus Artium (July 1972) and first collected in Marriages and Infidelities (1972) by Vanguard Press.

This fictional narrative is loosely based on the early life of Wolfgang Amadeus Mozart.

== Plot ==
"Nightmusic" is from a first-person point-of-view, present tense, by a child narrator. The story is presented in eight parts.

Part 1: A five-year-old musician is being groomed to observe a formal performance from the only instrument that he fears: the trumpet. His valet prepares him, critically yet affectionately. The boy is frightened, but determined to be brave and not to show it. He remarks: "I am centuries old." Recalling that he almost died of pneumonia the year before, he is learning that one must harden oneself to a cruel world. The valet picks up the trumpet and prepares to demonstrate it. The boy sits erect and expectant in his chair.

Part 2: The valet blows the trumpet in the boy's face.

Part 3: The boy is traveling in a horse-drawn carriage with his father and another youngster. The children are age six. It is winter and boys are cold. He is happy and content, not sure of his destination. The trio stops take a room for the night at an inn. The father poses as their valet, and treats the children like princes.

Part 4: The boy receives a letter from his mother, from whom he is far away. She is a remote figure and he wonders if she loves him. A performance is underway at which the boy is entertaining guests with his "toylike" sonatas, and he tries to please them. He plays one song as if it contained a secret code: "Do you love me?" His father weeps with joy at his son's performance and puts him to bed. He dreams of keyboards.

Part 5: The narrator reports that he has performed in Frankfurt in a powdered wig and an elegantly decorative sword. The young Goethe is impressed with his talent and considers him a budding immortal. The child is on a European tour and prays he will not contract smallpox.

Part 6: The child reflects that the happy scenario he presents may repel people, but he has formed a habit of pleasing his audiences, an end in itself. The answer to his question as to whether he is in love or not is one that his contemporaries wish to hear. He recognizes the power and the music he creates. His art cannot be fully grasped, like sunshine.

Part 7: This section is titled THEORY OF THE HAPPY ENDING. The musician describes his entry onto a stage in a huge and beautiful auditorium filled with an adoring crowd. He is almost overcome with emotion by the cheers and adulation. He strides to a huge piano, which dwarfs the small performer. His short legs dangle from the seat. The orchestra and the conductor take positions.

The performance proceeds beautifully. The audience is transported by its exquisite execution by the soloist. The child is mobbed by weeping men and women who storm the stage in the midst of the piece. They try to suppress his playing, but the boy perseveres: "I can't be stopped! I can't even be understood by people like you!" He berates those readers for rejecting this Happy Ending, accusing them of having "a piggish appetite for other people's sorrows; you are pigs - pitying me! - imagine, pitying me! No, I won't tell you you're happier than I am."

Part 8: The section is titled ALTERNATE THEORY OF THE HAPPY ENDING The narrator invites readers to imagine the delight he feels as his fingers fly across the piano keyboard, astonishing his audiences. He invites adult readers to imagine operating the pedals of the piano, that his tiny legs can barely reach.

The narrator compares the intensive musical rehearsals to rehearsals in preparation for death.

In the final performance, soloist and audience fuse into one, unleashing a wild and unrestrained expression of adulation. The happy ending is achieved.

== Background ==
In a personal communication to literary critic and biographer Joanne Creighton, Oates informed her that the story "is loosely based on Mozart's life—very loosely."

== Sources ==
- Creighton, Joanne V.. 1979. Joyce Carol Oates. Twayne Publishers, New York. Warren G. French, editor. ISBN 0-8057-7212-X
- Johnson, Greg. 1994. Joyce Carol Oates: A Study of the Short Fiction. Twayne's studies in short fiction; no. 57. Twayne Publishers, New York. ISBN 0-8057-0857-X
- Oates, Joyce Carol. 1972. Marriages and Infidelities. Vanguard Press, New York. ISBN 978-0814907184
