= The Metamorphosis (short story) =

- Short story by Joyce Carol Oates
- Country: United States
- Language: English

Publication
- Published in: New American Review
- Publication date: November 1971

"The Metamorphosis" is a short story by Joyce Carol Oates, originally published as "Others' Dreams" in New American Review (November 1971) and first collected in Marriages and Infidelities (1972) by Vanguard Press.

The story is a reinterpretation of the Franz Kafka story The Metamorphosis (1915), which Oates sets in an American suburb of the 1960s.

== Plot ==
The story is told in a mix of third-person omniscient and first-person points-of-view.

Automobile salesman Matthew Brown is vigorous, fit, and still handsome at 46 years of age. A family man, Matthew is proud yet modest concerning his long and lucrative career selling automobiles. Despite his relaxed exterior, he is highly self-controlled and obsessive about his salesmanship.

While dozing in his cubicle, he suddenly experiences a distressing and alien daydream. He instantly attempts to dismiss the dream as "someone else's, not his own." While waiting to meet a prospective customer – a mysterious Mr. Yates – Matthew reflects on his daydream: a vision of a grotesque, mummy-like corpse wrapped in blankets.

A number of short narratives, presented in italics, begin to interrupt the story: the narrators are mainly Matthew's five children recalling an unfolding crisis that begins with his unexpected early arrival home that afternoon.

Matthew informs the administrative assistant that he is feeling ill and must go home. As he drives through his neighborhood, he has vague suicidal thoughts of crashing into oncoming vehicles.

The italicized portions of the story's narrative suggest that he locks himself in his bedroom when he arrives at his house and refuses to explain his behavior, causing distress among his children and his wife, Florence. He strips off his clothing and crawls into bed. Recognizing that her husband is having a nervous breakdown, Florence summons Dr. Crane.

Matthew's internal monologue persists in a fragmented review of his obsessive concern regarding his duties as a salesman and his distressing awareness that he has disturbed his household. He subsequently descends into utter madness and helplessness. He must be spoon fed and requires a bedpan. He is taken away by an ambulance and institutionalized in an asylum.

== Comparison to Kafka's The Metamorphosis ==
Oates's "The Metamorphosis" is one of a number of "reimagined" stories that represent explicit tributes to the masters of the short story form, in this instance Franz Kafka's and his The Metamorphosis (1915).

In Kafka's original work, the protagonist, Gregor, is acutely aware of his physical transformation and stoically struggles to gain control of his grotesque insect-like body. Oates's Matthew, by contrast, is largely uncomprehending of his deranged condition, and descends into despair. Whereas Kafka casts Gregor as the victim of his family's disgust, Matthew's family appear to suffer due to their father's nervous breakdown. Critic Joanne V. Creighton writes:

The realistic details diffuse and obscure rather than enhance the original thematic statement and characterization. Kafka's story is powerful precisely because it employs the phantasmagoric, which Oates fails to attempt here...

Creighton adds: "The result is a story which is undeniably inferior to the Kafka masterpiece."

== Sources ==
- Creighton, Joanne V. 1979. Joyce Carol Oates. Twayne Publishers, New York. Warren G. French, editor. ISBN 0-8057-7212-X
- Johnson, Greg. 1994. Joyce Carol Oates: A Study of the Short Fiction. Twayne's studies in short fiction; no. 57. Twayne Publishers, New York. ISBN 0-8057-0857-X
- Oates, Joyce Carol. 1972. Marriages and Infidelities. Vanguard Press, New York. pp. 361–379 ISBN 978-0814907184
