= Archways (short story) =

- Short story by Joyce Carol Oates
- Country: United States
- Language: English

Publication
- Published in: Cosmopolitan
- Publication date: March 1965

"Archways" is a short story by Joyce Carol Oates originally published in Cosmopolitan (March 1965) and first collected in Upon the Sweeping Flood and Other Stories (1966) by Vanguard Press.

== Plot ==
"Archways" is written from a third-person point-of-view. Klein (only his surname is provided) is the focal character

The story is set in a large Eastern university. Klein is a 29-year-old graduate student. He was raised in an impoverished and dysfunctional working-class family. The theme of his childhood and youth is a sense of shame, and he still suffers from it. A sensitive and good-willed man, he has persistent thoughts of suicide.

Klein lives like a monk in a spartan dwelling off campus, existing on a $1500 annual grant. He has no friends and does nothing but study for his master's degree in English. He teaches a remedial course in English. Most of his students detest him.

One of his students, a woman in her twenties, visits his apartment. She has a friend in the building, but has stopped by to discuss one of her essays with Klein. He is embarrassed by the visit, but she opens up to him about her isolation and struggle to overcome her lack of early education. Klein is touched and feels tenderness towards her. When she leaves, he reads the girl's paper: it concerns the experience of childbirth. The encounter has left him agitated.

The next day, he returns her graded paper. She intercepts him after class. She is pleased with the grade, and Klein discerns that she wants to talk about its narrative, and invites her to a coffee shop. He learns that the girl had a child while married, gave up the child for adoption and then divorced the father. Klein feels tremendous empathy for her. They begin to draw close to one another, and sleep together in his apartment that night. Shortly thereafter they declare their love for one another.

Klein discovers himself in this affair in which he has for the first time in his life been in love. His self-esteem soars, and he senses that his professional life and academic success are within his grasp. Reassessing the relationship in this light, he doubts that he could have truly loved her. He decides to break off the romance quickly by pasting a note to her apartment door. The girl never appears in class again. Klein adds insult to injury when he gives her a failing grade in the class.

Klein's single-minded pursuit of his ambitions wins him a tenureship in a small college. He marries, sires children, blends into academic circles, and takes up sailing as a hobby.

== Theme ==
"Archways" serves as a precise rendering of one aspect of academia where "identity is achieved through the exploitation and destruction of others."

In what literary critic Greg Johnson calls a "bitterly ironic story," Oates closes the work with a rhetorical question delivered by the omniscient narrator: "What possibility of happiness without some random, incidental death."

The "random, incidental death" is the callously discarded and shamed girl to whom Klein owes his "undisguised" but comfortably complacent career as a minor academic and family man.

Critic Samuel F. Pickering considers "Archways" and other of Oates's academia-themed stories among her least successful.

From stories such as "Archways," the reader senses that something is seriously wrong in academia. But unlike Dickens, who, despite not knowing what he believed, knew what he did not believe, and consequently was able to write biting criticisms of political and social structures, Miss Oates never pinpoints what is wrong with the academic world. As a result her tales have little critical sting.

== Sources ==
- Creighton, Joanne V.. 1979. Joyce Carol Oates. Twayne Publishers, New York. Warren G. French, editor. ISBN 0-8057-7212-X
- Johnson, Greg. 1994. Joyce Carol Oates: A Study of the Short Fiction. Twayne's studies in short fiction; no. 57. Twayne Publishers, New York. ISBN 0-8057-0857-X
- Oates, Joyce Carol. 1966. Upon the Sweeping Flood. Vanguard Press, New York. ISBN 0449224635
- Pickering, Samuel F. 1974. "The Short Stories of Joyce Carol Oates" The Georgia Review, Vol. 28, No. 2 (Summer 1974) pp. 218–226. The Short Stories of Joyce Carol Oates Accessed 30 December 2024.
