= Blindfold (disambiguation) =

A blindfold is a garment, usually of cloth, tied to one's head to cover the eyes to disable the wearer's sight.

Blindfold may also refer to:

== In music and literature ==
- Blindfolded, a lost 1918 silent film
- Blindfold (1928 film), a 1928 film
- Blindfold, a 1960 novel by Lucille Fletcher
- Blindfold (1966 film), a 1966 film starring Rock Hudson and Claudia Cardinale
- Blindfold (short story) a 1972 short story by Joyce Carol Oates
- Aandhlo Pato (lit. 'Blind Fold'), an Indian Gujarati-language play, adapted into the 2002 film Aankhen by Vipul Shah
- Blindfold (EP), a 1991 EP by Curve
- Blindfold, a 1995 science fiction novel by Kevin J. Anderson
- "Blindfold," a song by Morcheeba from their 1998 album Big Calm
- Blindfold (album), a 1999 album by Greenthink
- "Blindfold" a song by Gunna from his 2020 album Wunna
- "Blindfold" a song by Wage War from their 2026 EP It Calls Me by Name and album Landfall

== Other ==
- Blindfold (character), a comic book character
- Blindfold chess, a way to play chess

== See also ==
- Blindfolded, a 1999 Finnish film
