= Where I Lived, and What I Lived For (Oates short story) =

"Where I Lived and What I Lived For"
- Short story by Joyce Carol Oates
- Country: United States
- Language: English

Publication
- Published in: Virginia Quarterly Review
- Publication date: Autumn 1970

"Where I Lived and What I Lived For" is a short story by Joyce Carol Oates originally published in the Virginia Quarterly Review (Autumn 1970) and first collected in Marriages and Infidelities (1974) by Vanguard Press.

The work is a "reimagining" of the second chapter of Henry David Thoreau's Walden (1854), also entitled "Where I Lived and What I Lived For".

== Plot ==
"Where I Lived and What I Lived For" is an allegory told in the first-person as interior monologue. The monologues alternate between two characters, which may actually be one individual who imagines his nemesis.

The story opens at nightfall. The narrator is running marathon-like in the rain. Apparently a large man or human-like being, he wears size 13 shoes. He is in pursuit of another man, perhaps a mile ahead of him, also on foot. He relishes the thought that his much smaller prey is terrified at his approach. The predator begins to imagine the thoughts of his prey and the internal narratives of each being are conflated. He reminisces about his now deceased father and his own fatherhood.

The narrative shifts to the man pursued, crashing and stumbling though the forest in panicked flight. The prey refers to himself in the third-person, and think of a serious accident his wife had on vacation in Maine. The pursuer contemplates how he will break the prey's backbone and carefully skin off his flesh.

The prey continues his panicked flight, recalling lies and half truths he's told during his life. He admits he is bored of life, of "technological civilization." His gums begin to bleed.

The prey reflects that his nemesis regards him as an object to eliminate, much as the prey thinks of his deceased parents, now rid of them. He imagines that the predator looks very much like himself. Hunter and fugitive near the end of their struggle: "But there is not time to make sense of it...I am hypnotized—He will die hypnotized—I will die—"

== Theme ==
Biographer Joanne V. Creighton asks rhetorically "what does this have to do with Thoreau?" concerning this "reimagining" of the famous chapter from his Walden (1854).

Oates's treatment "bears no thematic or formal resemblance" to Thoreau's material and, as such, is notable mostly for its "startling ironic contrasts." Oates's "Where I Lived, and What I Lived For," serves as a "phantasmagoria" rendering of the hunter-quarry contest, serving as an allegory of "contemporary life for modern man." Creighton writes:

To contrast this self-victimized man with nineteenth-century Thoreau highlights a shocking loss of independence, optimism, and joy. The parallel enhances Oates's own highly original story; it serves to broaden its thematic implications.

The prey protagonist narrator reports that it is "in the nature of the pursued to outwit the millions of people who are pursuing him, all those people who want to take his place, his possessions, the food he has left uneaten, his wrist watch, his very skin."

Whereas the narrative seems to be delivered by two competing protagonists exchanging "alternating monologues," in actuality, the homicidal stalker appears to exist only in the imagination of the fugitive who flees from him.

== Sources ==
- Creighton, Joanne V.. 1979. Joyce Carol Oates. Twayne Publishers, New York. Warren G. French, editor. ISBN 0-8057-7212-X
- Johnson, Greg. 1994. Joyce Carol Oates: A Study of the Short Fiction. Twayne's studies in short fiction; no. 57. Twayne Publishers, New York. ISBN 0-8057-0857-X
- Oates, Joyce Carol. 1972. Marriages and Infidelities. Vanguard Press, New York. ISBN 978-0814907184
