= Upon the Sweeping Flood (short story) =

- Short story by Joyce Carol Oates
- Country: United States
- Language: English

Publication
- Published in: Southwest Review
- Publication date: Spring 1963

"Upon the Sweeping Flood" is a short story by Joyce Carol Oates originally published in Southwest Review (Spring 1963) and first collected in Upon the Sweeping Flood and Other Stories (1966) by Vanguard Press.

== Plot ==
"Upon the Sweeping Flood" is written from a third-person point-of-view, with Walter Stuart as the focal character.

The setting is a rural community in the Eastern United States. Stuart is notable figure in the county, a quiet but physically imposing man of high rectitude and a "faith in discipline and order."

A hurricane is approaching the region, and residents from outlying areas are desperately trying to evacuate in the driving wind and rain. Stuart ignores a deputy sheriff's warning and drives his automobile towards the advancing storm to see if he can assist anyone. He finds the heroic quest exhilarating.

Miles from town he passes a run-down farmhouse. Two teenagers dash toward his vehicle, and he splashes them with mud: a girl about eighteen years old and a boy about thirteen. Stopping, the panicked siblings force their way into the car. The girl is vulgar and aggressive, screaming abuse at Stuart to turn the vehicle head towards town. The full force of the hurricane hits and the roads are instantly flooded with water and mud. The youngsters abandon the car and run towards the house for shelter. Stuart follows them.

The fury of the hurricane makes it difficult to see and hear anything. Stuart and the boy struggle to lead a horse to the stable. The boy resents Stuart's assistance, and curses him. The horse, in its terror, cannot be controlled and flees. Stuart drags the boy inside the house.

Neither of the children can comprehend Stuart's motivation in risking his own safety on their behalf and distrust him. The girl expresses sneering contempt for his altruism, and wonders where his own family is. Stuart suddenly realizes he has not thought of his wife and daughter during the ordeal. He feels shame and remorse for his folly.

The property is flooding and water rises through the floorboards. The trio flee upstairs, but the water continues to rise. The entire house begins to collapse. Stuart takes an ax and cuts an escape hatch in the roof. He assures the youngsters "God loves you!" and forces them through the opening. Chaos ensues, they each cling to a fragment of roof.

Stuart has a momentary sense of accomplishment, his selfless act has achieved something valuable. He reassesses his life and its purpose. The girl has warmed to Stuart and thanks him for saving them. The morning lights reveal the wreckage left in the storm's wake. Stuart and the children wade to a low ridge, but the boy seems to be having a fit brought on by trauma. Reaching the ridge, the children regain their senses and emotional balance. In contrast, Stuart's mental state, however, begins to deteriorate, losing his epiphanic insight. The girl senses that something is amiss when Stuart picks up a hunk of wood and declares he will kill some snakes. A disgust for the boy suddenly consumes him, and he strikes him on the head, then strangles him in the flood water. The boy dies, and Stuart prepares to assault the girl. Suddenly a rescue boat appears, and he wades towards it crying out, "Save me! Save me!"

== Theme ==
"Upon the Sweeping Flood" presents an allegorical compendium of Oates's perennial themes. According to literary critic Greg Johnson, these include issues related to personal identity, fear-based misapprehensions about the real world, nature's indifference to the fate of human beings, and the potential for "madness and violence" in inherent in outwardly humane and rational beings.

Oates locates the central theme of "Upon the Sweeping Flood" in protagonist Walter Stuart's "faith in discipline and order," which he mistakenly confuses for altruism. The story's compelling narrative examines the dichotomy of "an essentially decent, responsible man" whose need to impose order on the world leads him to an act of homicidal rage.

Johnson comments on the significance of the title story from the collection:

Stuart becomes the book's most poignant example of the self-delusion and spiritual blindness by which human beings seek to impose meaning upon a world of sweeping indifference and ceaseless turmoil.

The fierce rainstorm and the catastrophic flooding appear as symbols for Stuart's mental deterioration and helplessness: "Oates carefully highlights the allegorical parallel between the storm and the incipient psychological chaos that causes Stuart to doubt his long-cherished belief in order..."

As the storm subsides, Stuart has a revelatory moment, comprehending the inadequacy of his life and "the hollowness of his carefully groomed respectability." Isolated by his liberating epiphany, he reacts to the entrenched ignorance he detects in the 13-year-old epileptic boy and the verbally abusive 18-year-old girl he has rescued, beating the boy to death.

With this murder, the "deepest irony" of the story appears: In an "epiphanic self-revelation," Stuart discovers that his rational mind is subject to a natural order that provides for pointless brutality and violence. Moreover, any hope for redemption is impossible.

Biographer Joanne V. Creighton writes: "Oates shows that a seething emotional core lies dormant in even the most quiescent people."

== Sources ==
- Creighton, Joanne V. 1979. Joyce Carol Oates. Twayne Publishers, New York. Warren G. French, editor. ISBN 0-8057-7212-X
- Johnson, Greg. 1994. Joyce Carol Oates: A Study of the Short Fiction. Twayne's studies in short fiction; no. 57. Twayne Publishers, New York. ISBN 0-8057-0857-X
- Oates, Joyce Carol. 1966. Upon the Sweeping Flood. Vanguard Press, New York. ISBN 0449224635
- Oates, Joyce Carol. 1973. "Fictions, Dreams, Revelations," introduction to Scenes from American Life: Contemporary Short Fiction. Vanguard Press, New York. p. viii ISBN 978-0394316833 in Johnson, Greg. 1994. Joyce Carol Oates: A Study of the Short Fiction. 1973. Twayne's studies in short fiction; no. 57. p. 39 Twayne Publishers, New York. ISBN 0-8057-0857-X
