= Blindfold (short story) =

1972 short story by Joyce Carol Oates

- Short story by Joyce Carol Oates
- Country: United States
- Language: English

Publication
- Published in: The Southern Review
- Publication date: Spring 1972

"Blindfold" is a short story by Joyce Carol Oates originally published in The Southern Review (Spring 1972) and first collected in The Goddess and Other Women (1974) by Vanguard Press.

== Plot ==
"Blindfold" is written from a third-person omniscient point-of-view, with the child Betsy the focal character. The short story is divided into two parts. In part I, Betsy is seven; in part II she is nine.

=== I: A Drive Outward ===
A well-to-do uncle takes his favorite niece, Betsy, for a drive to a local lake. At her uncle's request, she acts as a pretend navigator for the excursion, studying the highway map. Uncle Dick indulges her, promising Betsy an ice cream cone.

Betsy's mother, the uncle's sister, is a strict disciplinarian: she had slapped Betsy that morning, a fact Betsy does not mention to her uncle. Uncle Dick routinely defends and champions her mother: "Your mother is a wonderful woman" he intones. Betsy's father is contemptuous of his brother-in-law, and warns his wife to keep him out of the house when he is at home.

Betsy recalls a game of blindfold her uncle had initiated at the park, placing a scarf tightly around her eyes after taking her to a secluded area. The game has been a regular feature of their subsequent excursions, a fact the uncle insists she never reveal: "That's our secret. Nobody can know about that".

=== II: A Drive Home ===
Uncle Dick and the blindfolded Betsy are discovered by an elderly married couple hiking near the lake. The uncle clasps his unbuttoned raincoat around his body and pulls the blindfold of his niece. The husband approaches, shouting angrily at her uncle. The uncle is weeping and attempting to cover his face. The wife, fearful of becoming involved, leads her outraged spouse away.

Betsy discerns that the game they have played for years has been exposed, and she instantly feels contempt for her uncle. Uncle Dick drives down the highway at high speed, wildly passing other vehicles in a suicidal panic. Betsy pleads with him to slow down, promising not to tell about the blindfold game. The vehicle careens off the road into a ditch to avoid a collision with a truck. The uncle dies, either from the accident or a stroke; Betsy suffers only contusions.

Betsy's mother picks her up at the hospital, in a state of anxiety as to how to arrange her brother's funeral. She is exasperated with her daughter for her complicity in his death. Betsy guesses that her uncle is dead and declares: "I'm glad he's dead." Her mother begins to berate her, and warns her daughter not to repeat the things she revealed about her uncle to the hospital staff and police. Betsy's mother seizes her and demands she express contrition for her uncle's death.

== Theme ==
Biographer Joanne V. Creighton provides the thematic narrative of "Blindfold":

Betsy accepts the private game of blindfold in exchange for her privileged position as favored niece until their game is discovered by a stranger. Then she totally denies all responsibility. She cruelly relishes her uncle's death and exposes his weaknesses to her mother.

Creighton adds, "At a very young age, Betsy is learning the exploitative possibilities of sexual attraction."

== Sources ==
- Creighton, Joanne V. 1979. Joyce Carol Oates. Twayne Publishers, New York. Warren G. French, editor. ISBN 0-8057-7212-X
- Johnson, Greg. 1994. Joyce Carol Oates: A Study of the Short Fiction. Twayne's studies in short fiction; no. 57. Twayne Publishers, New York. ISBN 0-8057-0857-X
- Oates, Joyce Carol. 1974. The Goddess and Other Women. Vanguard Press, New York. ISBN 978-0814907450
