= Upon the Sweeping Flood and Other Stories =

1966 collection of short stories written by Joyce Carol Oates

Upon the Sweeping Flood
- First edition
- Author: Joyce Carol Oates
- Language: English
- Publisher: Vanguard Press
- Publication date: 1966
- Publication place: United States
- Media type: Print (hardback)
- Pages: 224
- ISBN: 0449224635

Upon the Sweeping Flood and Other Stories is a collection of short stories written by Joyce Carol Oates. It was published in 1966 by Vanguard Press.

== Stories ==
Those stories first appearing in literary journals are indicated.

- "Stigmata" (Colorado Quarterly, Spring 1963)
- "The Survival of Childhood" (Southwest Review, Spring 1964)
- "The Death of Mrs. Sheer" (MSS, 1964)
- "First Views of the Enemy" (Prairie Schooner, Spring 1964)
- "At the Seminary" (The Kenyon Review, Summer 1965)
- "Norman and the Killer" (Southwest Review, Spring 1965)
- "The Man That Turned Into a Statue"
- "Archways" (Cosmopolitan, March 1965)
- "Dying" (The Transatlantic Review, Spring 1966)
- "What Death With Love Should Have to Do." (Literary Review, Autumn 1965)
- "Upon the Sweeping Flood" (Southwest Review, Spring 1963)

== Reception ==
Upon the Sweeping Flood "achieves in its best stories the distinctively violent yet compassionate vision that would inform her later fiction" according to literary critic Greg Johnson.

Kirkus Reviews was "disappointed" at the lurid narratives involving "hideous incidentals" which they report mars the collection. Acknowledging that Oates is a notable author, the article observes that the volume suggests "An on-going talent—idling."

== Analysis ==
Joanne V. Creighton points out both the differences and the similarities between the two volumes:

Less often set in Eden County than the stories in By the North Gate, those in Upon the Sweeping Flood embody some of the same themes: the groping of inarticulate people for order and meaning and the discovery of hidden, unlovely depth of passion or of emptiness within one's self. The emphasis here, however, is more focused on the interrelationships among people, be they familial, emotional, or social. Oates exhibits here the beginning of her intense preoccupation with both the tenacious bands of the family and the mysterious emotions of love.

== Sources ==
- Johnson, Greg. 1994. Joyce Carol Oates: A Study of the Short Fiction in Twayne's studies in short fiction; no. 57. Twayne Publishers, New York. ISBN 0-8057-0857-X
- Kirkus Reviews. 1966. "UPON THE SWEEPING FLOOD AND OTHER STORIES" Bookshelf review, 15 April 1966. UPON THE SWEEPING FLOOD AND OTHER STORIES | Kirkus Reviews Retrieved 9 October 2023.
- Lercangee, Francine. 1986. Joyce Carol Oates: An Annotated Bibliography. Garland Publishing, New York and London. ISBN 0-8240-8908-1
- Oates, Joyce Carol. 1966. Upon the Sweeping Flood. Vanguard Press, New York. ISBN 0449224635
