= Extenuating Circumstances: Stories of Crime and Suspense =

2022 collection of short fiction by Joyce Carol Oates

- First edition
- Author: Joyce Carol Oates
- Language: English
- Publisher: The Mysterious Press
- Publication date: 2022
- Publication place: United States
- Media type: Print (hardback)
- Pages: 615
- ISBN: 978-1638084051

Extenuating Circumstances: Stories of Crime and Suspense is a collection of previously collected and uncollected short fiction by Joyce Carol Oates published in 2022 by The Mysterious Press.

"By the River" was anthologized in Best American Short Stories, 1969.

"Yarrow" was among the 1988 prize stories for the O. Henry Awards, as was "Why Don't You Come Live With Me, It's Time" in 1992.

"The Undesirable Table" won the Pushcart Prize XX, Best of the Small Presses (1996).

== Stories ==
Selected periodical or book of original publication are indicated.

- "The Death of Mrs. Sheer" (MSS, 1964)
- "In the Warehouse" (The Transatlantic Review, Summer 1967)
- "By the River" (December, December 1968)
- "Queen of the Night" (John Lord Press 1979)
- "The Revenge of the Foot, 1970" (Salmagundi, No. 108, Fall 1985)
- "The Doll" (Epoch, 1980)
- "Little Wife" (Kenyon Review, Spring 1986)
- "Yarrow" (TriQuarterly, No. 78, Spring 1990)
- "Haunted"
- "Death Valley" (Esquire, July 1, 1988)
- "Craps" (Boulevard )
- "Family" (Omni, November 1993)
- "Ladies and Gentlemen:" (Harper's Magazine, December 1990)
- "Why Don't You Come Live With Me, It's Time" in Tikkun)
- "The Buck" (Story)
- "The Model" (Ellery Queen)
- "Extenuating Circumstances" (Sisters in Crime 5, Berkley Books 1992)
- "The Girl Who Was to Die" (The Gettysburg Review, 1993)
- "Poor Bibi" Haunted: Tales of the Grotesque "Poor Thing" in Tikkun)
- "The Undesirable Table" (Raritan, 1994)
- "The Hand-Puppet" (Tales of the Impossible, Harper Prism, 1995)
- "Valentine" (Michigan Quarterly Review, Vol. 36, No. 1 1996)
- "The Collector of Hearts" (Seventeen, 1998)
- "The Sons of Angus MacElster" (Conjunctions, No. 30 1998)

== Reception ==
Describing the collection as "a real treat," reviewer Ray Palen at Bookreporter.com writes:

These stories have a little of everything and do such a fine job representing her style of writing, which can be best described as surprising, unsettling, disturbing, unique and never predictable.

New York Review of Books critic Richard Cytowic, characterizing the Oates's tales as "unsettling" and "disquieting" writes:

She explores the forbidden corners of human experience. Joyce Carol Oates' tales are unsettling, disquieting, some endings left hanging, leaving readers not answers but questions that implicate more horror yet to come to the normal-seeming characters who inhabit them.

== Sources ==
- Cytowic, Richard. 2022. "Extenuating Circumstances." New York Review of Books. https://www.nyjournalofbooks.com/book-review/extenuating-circumstances Accessed 19 March 2025.
- Oates, Joyce Carol. 2012. Extenuating Circumstances. The Mysterious Press, New York. ISBN 978-1638084051
- Palen, Ray. 2022. "Extenuating Circumstances: Stories of Crime and Suspense." Bookreporter.com, July 22, 2022. https://www.bookreporter.com/reviews/extenuating-circumstances-stories-of-crime-and-suspense Accessed 21 March 2025.
