= In the Warehouse =

- Short story by Joyce Carol Oates
- Country: United States
- Language: English

Publication
- Published in: Transatlantic Review
- Publication date: Summer 1967

"In the Warehouse" is a short story by Joyce Carol Oates originally published in Transatlantic Review (Summer 1967) and first collected in The Goddess and Other Women (1974) by Vanguard Press.

== Plot ==
The story is told in the first-person and in the present tense by the 12-year-old protagonist, Sarah.

Sarah is a companion to Ronnie, age 13 who lives in a low-income working-class neighborhood. Sarah's family is orderly and stable. Ronnie is a neglected child in an impoverished family of five children raised by a single mother. Big for her age, Ronnie bullies and dominates the smaller Sarah, both physically and verbally. After rubbing Sarah's face in the dirt at the playground Ronnie admonishes her: "I didn't mean to hurt you, but you had it coming. Right? You gotta do what I say. If we're friends you got to obey me, don't you?" Sarah submits to her "friend," who has known one another for only two months.

At nightfall, Ronnie insists they visit an abandoned warehouse. Both girls are familiar with the derelict building. As they stroll along the sidewalk, local boys good-naturedly mock Ronnie and she responds with a four-letter word, eliciting laughs. Sarah is ignored. Ronnie, who disparages the locals residents, tells Sarah of her elaborate plans for revenge, involving "certain acts with shears, razors, ice picks, butcher knives..." These threats sicken Sarah, but she remains in thrall of Ronnie. She secretly wishes to be free of Ronnie: "She is like a big hulking dead body tied to me." Inside the warehouse, Sarah pleads with Ronnie to follow her upstairs so they can look out the windows.

Sarah reaches the top of the stairs first and turns. As Ronnie is two steps below, Sarah shoves her, sending her tumbling and screaming down the stairs. Sarah descends to find a broken and bleeding body; Ronnie pleads "Sarah! Ma!...Ma, help me!" Sarah returns home and sleeps soundly.

The narrator, Sarah, comments on the incident 20 years later. She reflects that she feels no remorse for her homicidal assault, and never has. She is married with two children, lives in a comfortable suburb, and enjoys a career as a professional writer. She concludes: "My stories are more real than my childhood; my childhood is just another story, but one written by someone else."

== Theme ==
"In the Warehouse" presents a "dismayingly young" avenger, the 12-year-old Sarah. Decades after killing her childhood friend and tormentor, the tomboy Ronnie, does Sarah - now a thoroughly conventional wife and mother - reflect upon the incident and attempt a reckoning with herself.

Literary critic Greg Johnson comments on the tragedy of Sarah's failure at redemption and self-actualization:

She has waited twenty years to feel guilty, but she cannot, since the murder represented her single expression of power and self-definition. Yet in killing Ronnie she has unconsciously destroyed her own potential for personal growth...

Johnson adds that Sarah is thus consigned to the life of suburban anonymity and a "powerless social role."

Biographer Joanne V. Creighton offers a similar assessment of Oates's protagonist. In shoving Ronnie down a stairwell and ignoring the mortally injured girl's cries for help, Sarah brutally effects her liberation, "killing off the frightening and unwanted part of her world." Unbeknownst to Sarah, she has gained her freedom in a faustian bargain - the inability to feel any remorse for what she did.

Creighton notes: "In destroying Ronnie, Sarah has destroyed her own emotional life...she has paid dearly for immunity."

== Sources ==
- Joanne V. Creighton. 1979. Joyce Carol Oates. Twayne Publishers, New York. Warren G. French, editor. ISBN 0-8057-7212-X
- Johnson, Greg. 1994. Joyce Carol Oates: A Study of the Short Fiction. Twayne's studies in short fiction; no. 57. Twayne Publishers, New York. ISBN 0-8057-0857-X
- Oates, Joyce Carol. 1974/ The Goddess and Other Women. Vanguard Press, New York. ISBN 978-0814907450
