= The Lady with the Dog =

1899 short story by Anton Chekhov

- Short story by Anton Chekhov
- Original title: Дама с собачкой
- Language: Russian
- Genre: Short fiction

Publication
- Published in: Russkaya Mysl
- Publication date: December 1899
- Publication place: Russia
- Published in English: 1903

"The Lady with the Dog" (Russian: Дама с собачкой, romanized: Dama s sobachkoy) (Note: On account of the Russian language's lack of articles, the story's title's literal translation is "Lady with Dog", where "Dog" includes a diminutive morpheme. English language translations of the title include "The Lady with a Dog", "The Lady with the Little Dog", "The Lady with the Small Dog", "The Lady with the Pet Dog", "(The) Lady with (the) Lapdog", etc.) is a short story by Anton Chekhov. First published in 1899, it describes an adulterous affair between an unhappily married Moscow banker and a young married woman that begins while both are vacationing alone in Yalta. It is one of Chekhov's most famous pieces of short fiction, and Vladimir Nabokov considered it to be one of the greatest short stories ever written.

== Plot ==
Dmitri Gurov works in a Moscow bank. He is nearing 40, married, and has a daughter and two sons. Unhappy in his marriage and the monotony and meaninglessness of his life, he is frequently unfaithful and considers women to be of "a lower race". While vacationing in Yalta, he sees a young woman walking along the seafront with her little Pomeranian, and endeavors to make her acquaintance. The lady, Anna Sergeyevna, is also unhappily married and vacationing without her husband named von Dideritz. Anna and Dmitri soon commence an affair, and spend most of their time together, often walking and taking drives to the nearby village of Oreanda. Though she is expecting her husband to come to Yalta, he eventually sends word for her to come home, saying that something is wrong with his eyes. Gurov sees her off at the station. As they part, both feel that they will never see each other again, and thus their affair is over.

Returning to Moscow, to his loveless marriage and his daily routine, working by day and socializing by night, Gurov expects to soon forget young Anna, but to his surprise, her memory haunts him. Unexpectedly, he falls deeply in love for the first time, after many affairs and just as he is approaching middle age. He feels that he must see Anna, despite the obvious complications. On the ruse of going to St. Petersburg to attend to personal business, he sets off to Anna's hometown to find her. Learning the location of the family's residence from a hotel porter, he finds the house, only to realize that it would be unwise to intrude. In despair, he rationalizes that Anna has probably forgotten him and found someone else, and heads back to his hotel.

In the evening, he remembers having seen a sign earlier in the day announcing the opening performance of The Geisha. Reasoning that Anna and her husband might attend, he goes to the theater. The couple enters and he watches intently. When the husband goes out for a smoke during the first interval, Gurov greets Anna, who is bewildered and runs from him. After following her through the theater, he confronts her and she confides that she has been thinking of him constantly. Frightened, she begs him to leave and promises to see him in Moscow.

Anna makes excuses to travel to Moscow, telling her husband that she is going there to see a doctor, which he "believes and does not believe". The pair are now fully aware that for the first time in their lives they have actually fallen in love, and they both wonder how they might overcome the many challenges that face them and achieve their fervent wish to spend their lives together. They desperately try to come up with a plan, but the story ends without offering a resolution:

They … talked of how to avoid the necessity for secrecy, for deception, for living in different towns and not seeing each other for long stretches of time … and it was clear to both of them that … the most complicated and difficult part of their journey was just beginning.

== Interpretations ==
The story can be seen as "Gurov's spiritual journey—his transformation from a connoisseur of women to a man tenderly devoted to a single ordinary woman." The story can also be seen as "playing with the paradox that a lie—a husband deceiving a wife or a wife deceiving a husband—can be the fulcrum of truth of feeling, a vehicle of authenticity."

Maxim Gorky, a Russian writer from a working-class background, saw the importance of the story as a wake-up call to people "to let go of sleepy, half-dead existence."

Robert Fulford offers yet another interpretation of the story:

What Chekhov says in this sophisticated parable is that love radically alters the landscape of existence. When touched by love, we know the world in a different way. Love changes the inner landscape, too. Under the pressure of love, Gurov looks inside himself and sees someone he has not known before, someone capable of feelings that he barely knew existed.

Nabokov wrote about the unconventional ending:

All the traditional rules ... have been broken in this wonderful short story ... no problem, no regular climax, no point at the end. And it is one of the greatest stories ever written.

== Historical background ==
The plot of the story bears a resemblance to Chekhov's own life, as he had fallen in love with Olga Knipper, the actress whom he would later marry, while living in Yalta in the winter of 1898–99. Among other similarities, Knipper and Anna both have German last names, were both much younger than their lovers, and both had to live away from them at first.

== Publication history ==
The story was written in Yalta, where Chekhov had moved on his doctor's advice to take advantage of the warmer climate owing to his advancing tuberculosis. It was first published in the December 1899 issue of the magazine Russkaya Mysl (Russian Thought) with the subtitle "A Story" ("Rasskaz"). Since then it has been published in numerous collections and languages, and is one of Chekhov's best-known stories. The first English translation appeared in 1903.

== Adaptations ==
Rodion Schedrin composed a ballet in one act called The Lady with the Lapdog, first performed on 20 November 1985 in Moscow by the Bolshoi Theatre, Alexander Lazarev (cond).

A 1960 film version was produced by Josef Heifitz and starred Alexei Batalov and Iya Savvina. It won a Special Prize for "lofty humanism and artistic excellence" at the 1960 Cannes Film Festival.

An adaptation of The Lady with the Dog, Dark Eyes (Italian: Oci ciornie; Russian: Очи чёрные; French: Les Yeux noirs) is a 1987 Italian and Russian language film which tells the story of a 19th-century married Italian man who falls in love with a married Russian woman. It stars Marcello Mastroianni, Silvana Mangano, Oleg Tabakov, Yelena Safonova, Pina Cei and Vsevolod Larionov. The film was adapted by Aleksandr Adabashyan, Suso Cecchi d'Amico and Nikita Mikhalkov, "inspired by" stories by Anton Chekhov. It was directed by Mikhalkov. Mastroianni received Best Actor at the Cannes Film Festival and was nominated for the Academy Award for Best Actor.

The story has also been adapted for stage; for example, an adaptation by Peter Campbell was featured at the 2002 Chekhov Now Festival in New York. A play titled Sunstroke, directed by Oleg Mirochnikov, combines The Lady with the Dog with Ivan Bunin's Sunstroke. The play was performed in 2013 at the Platform Theatre in London. An opera version titled "The Lady with the Pet Dog" was premiered at Cornell College in Mount Vernon, Iowa in 2010.

Joyce Carol Oates wrote a short story adaptation of the story also entitled "The Lady with the Pet Dog" published in 1972. Oates' story is told from Anna's point of view and is set in New York and Nantucket.

Brian Friel's play The Yalta Game (2001) is loosely based on this short story by Chekhov.

Tony Tanner debuted a musical-comedy version of the story in September, 2016, which he wrote and directed. Titled "The Lady with the Little Dog," it was performed at the Great Hall Courtyard of Plummer Park in West Hollywood, California.

== Cultural references ==
In the 2008 film The Reader, based on Bernhard Schlink's 1995 novel, the illiterate Hanna (Kate Winslet) first learns to read by listening to an audio recording of the story, which is referred to by her in the movie as The Lady with the Little Dog, read by her former lover Michael (Ralph Fiennes). The short story is also a central theme of the 2014 movie Gurov and Anna by director Rafaël Ouellet.
