= Writers' Union of Canada =

Canadian non-profit organization for writers

- Formation: November 3, 1973; 52 years ago
- Headquarters: Toronto, Ontario, Canada
- Website: writersunion.ca

The Writers’ Union of Canada (TWUC) is the national organization of professionally published writers. TWUC was founded in 1973 to work with governments, publishers, booksellers, and readers to improve the conditions of Canadian writers. TWUC advocates on behalf of writers’ collective interests, and delivers value to members through advocacy, community, and information. TWUC believes in a thriving, diverse Canadian culture that values and supports writers. As of 2024, the Union is over 2,800 members strong.

The Union administers the Danuta Gleed Literary Award for the best first collection of short stories in English published in Canada. TWUC also administers the Short Prose Competition for Emerging Writers, which aims to discover, encourage, and promote new writers of short prose in order to provide opportunity and exposure to developing writers.

Each year the Union awards the Freedom to Read Award as part of the celebration of Freedom to Read Week across Canada in February of each year. The award recognizes work in support of freedom of expression. Recipients have included authors Derek Finkle and Charles Montpetit as well as former MP Wendy Lill, Toronto lawyer Clayton Ruby, and Janine Fuller, owner of Vancouver's embattled Little Sisters bookstore.

Danny Ramadan is the Chair of The Writers' Union of Canada. John Degen is its Chief Executive Officer. Past chairs have included noted authors Marian Engel, Margaret Atwood, Pierre Berton, June Callwood, Timothy Findley, Graeme Gibson, Susan Musgrave, Paul Quarrington, Maggie Siggins, Susan McCaslin and Susan Swan.

TWUC headquarters are based in Toronto.

== See also ==
- Lists of Canadian writers
