= The Dead (Joyce short story) =

Short story by James Joyce

- Short story by James Joyce
- Country: Ireland
- Language: English
- Genre: Short story

Publication
- Published in: Dubliners
- Media type: Print (hardback and paperback)
- Publication date: 1914

Chronology
Grace	—

"The Dead" is the final short story in the 1914 collection Dubliners by James Joyce. It is by far the longest story in the collection and, at 15,952 words, is sometimes described as a novella. The story deals with themes of love and loss and also raises questions about the nature of the Irish identity.

The story was well-received by critics and academics and described by T. S. Eliot as one of the greatest English-language short stories ever written. It was later adapted into a one-act play by Hugh Leonard and into the 1987 film The Dead written by Tony Huston and directed by John Huston.

== Characters ==
- Gabriel Conroy – the main character of the story.
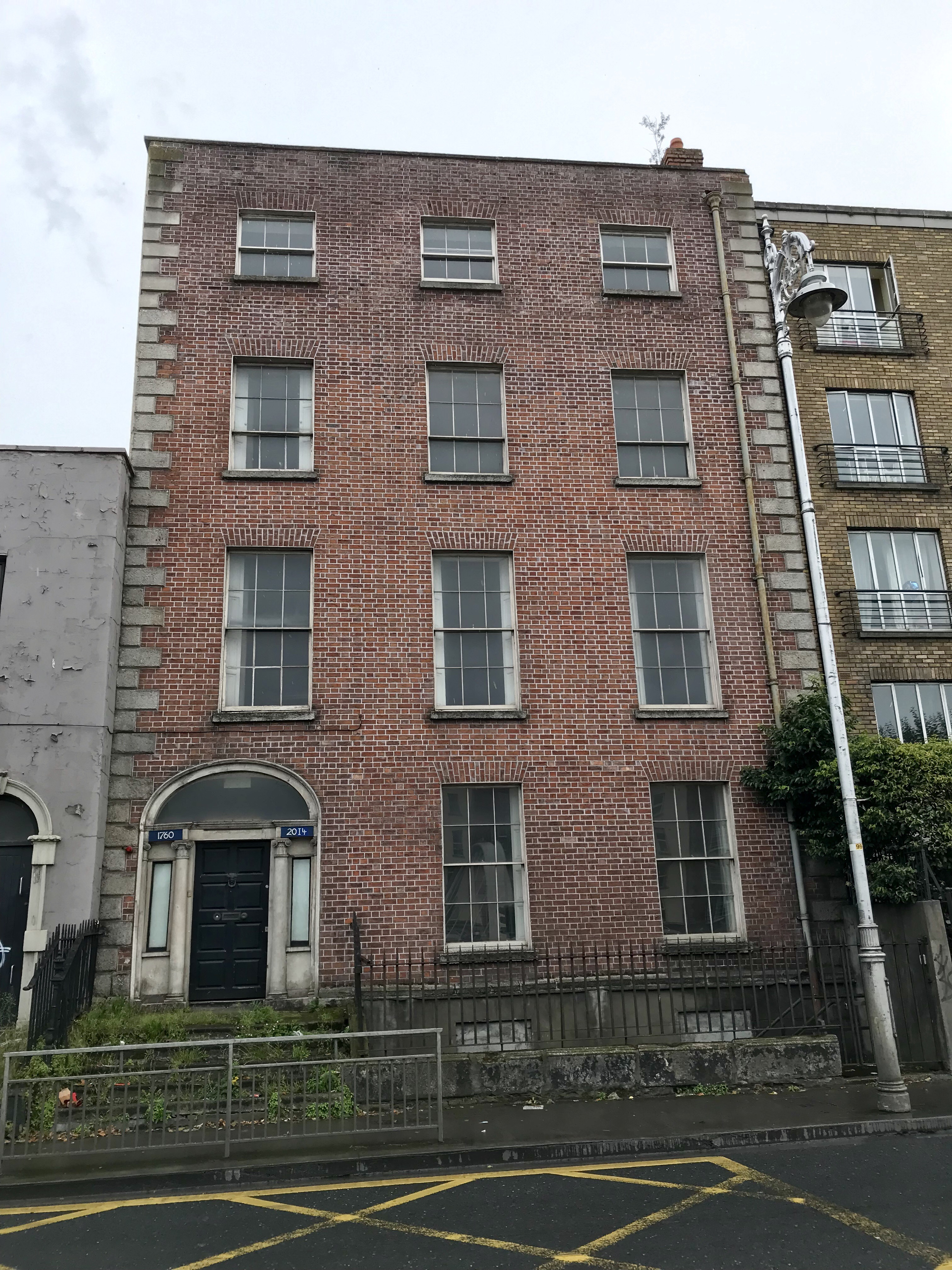
  15 Usher's Island, the house once partly rented by Joyce's great aunts that was the model for "the dark gaunt house on Usher's Island", the principal setting for the story
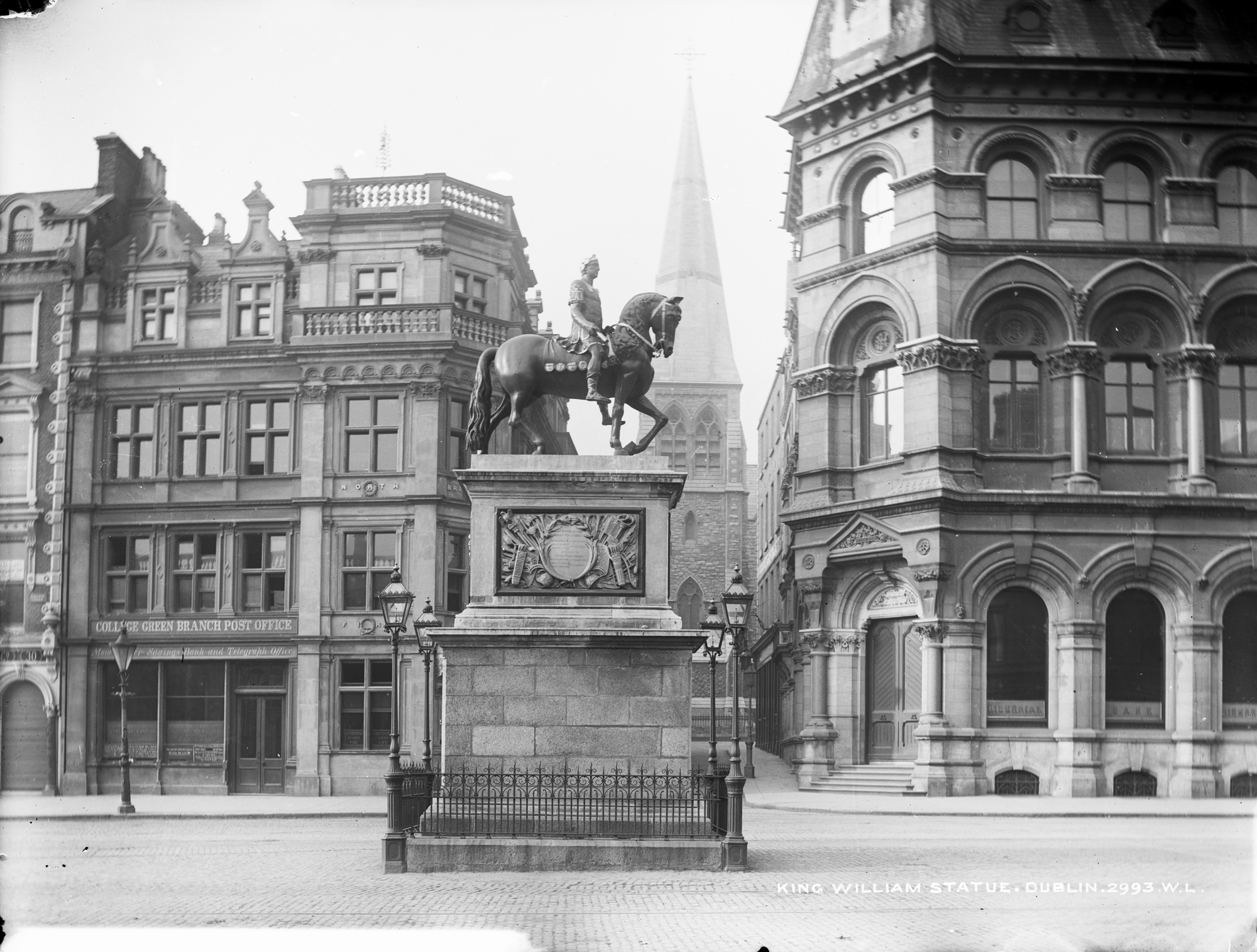
  The statue of William III of England on Dame Street, Dublin, appears in a story told by Gabriel about his grandfather Patrick Morkan.
- Kate Morkan and Julia Morkan – Gabriel and Mary Jane's aunts. They are elderly sisters who throw a party every year during Christmas time.
- Mary Jane Morkan – niece of Kate and Julia Morkan.
- Lily – the caretaker's daughter.
- Gretta Conroy – Gabriel's wife.
- Molly Ivors – a long-time acquaintance of the family
- Mr. Browne – only Protestant guest at the party.
- Freddy Malins – an alcoholic and friend of the family.
- Mrs Malins – Freddy Malins' mother.
- Bartell D'Arcy – a tenor.

Gabriel Conroy, Gretta Conroy, Kate and Julia Morkan, and Bartell d'Arcy are all alluded to in James Joyce's later work, Ulysses, though no character from "The Dead" makes a direct appearance in the novel.

== Plot summary ==
The story centres on Gabriel Conroy, a teacher and part-time book reviewer, and explores the relationships he has with his family and friends. Gabriel and his wife, Gretta, arrive late to an annual Christmastime party (in fact, it is Twelfth Night) hosted by his aunts, Kate and Julia Morkan, who eagerly receive him. After an awkward encounter with Lily, the caretaker's daughter, Gabriel goes upstairs, and joins the rest of the party attendees. Gabriel worries about the speech he has to give, especially because it contains academic references, which he fears his audience will not understand. When Freddy Malins arrives drunk, as the hosts of the party had feared, Aunt Kate asks Gabriel to make sure he is all right.

As the party moves on, Gabriel is confronted by Miss Ivors, an Irish nationalist, about his publishing a weekly literary column in the Unionist newspaper The Daily Express. Gabriel points out that he gets 15 shillings a week, and "the books he received for review were almost more welcome than the paltry cheque". She teases him by calling him a "West Brit". He thinks this charge is highly unfair, but fails to offer a satisfactory rejoinder. The encounter ends awkwardly, which bothers Gabriel the rest of the night. He becomes more disaffected, when he tells his wife of the encounter, and she expresses an interest in returning to visit her childhood home of Galway. The music and party continue; but Gabriel retreats into himself, thinking of the snow outside and his impending speech.

Dinner begins, with Gabriel seated at the head of the table. The guests discuss music and the practices of certain monks. Once the dining has died down, Gabriel thinks once more about the snow – and begins his speech, praising traditional Irish hospitality, observing that "we are living in a sceptical...thought-tormented age," and referring to Aunt Kate, Aunt Julia, and Mary Jane as the Three Graces. The speech ends with a toast, and the guests sing "For they are jolly gay fellows".

As the party winds down, the guests filter out, and Gabriel prepares to leave. He finds his wife standing, apparently lost in thought, at the top of the stairs. In another room Bartell D'Arcy sings "The Lass of Aughrim". The Conroys leave; and Gabriel is excited, for it has been a long time since he and Gretta have had a night in a hotel to themselves. When they arrive at the hotel, Gabriel's aspirations of passionate sex are conclusively dashed by Gretta's lack of interest. He presses her about what is bothering her, and she admits that she is "thinking about that song, The Lass of Aughrim". She admits that it reminds her of someone, a young man named Michael Furey, who had courted her in her youth in Galway. He used to sing "The Lass of Aughrim" for her. Furey died at seventeen, early in their relationship; and she had been very much in love with him. She believes that it was his insistence on coming to meet her in the winter and the rain, while already sick, that killed him. After telling these things to Gabriel, Gretta becomes overpowered with emotion, heaving great sobs as she lies down on the bed, falling asleep crying.

At first, Gabriel is shocked and dismayed that there was something of such significance in his wife's life that he never knew about. He ponders the role of the countless dead in living people's lives, and observes that everyone he knows, himself included, will one day only be a memory. Gabriel stands at the window, watching the snow fall; and the narrative expands past him, edging into the surreal, and encompassing the entirety of Ireland. As the story ends, we are told that "His soul swooned slowly, as he heard the snow falling faintly through the universe, and faintly falling, like the descent of their last end, upon all the living and the dead".

== Critique and analysis ==
T. S. Eliot called "The Dead" one of the greatest short stories ever written in English. Joyce biographer and critic Richard Ellmann wrote: "In its lyrical, melancholy acceptance of all that life and death offer, 'The Dead' is a linchpin in Joyce's work". Cornell University Joyce scholar Daniel R. Schwarz described it as "that magnificent short novel of tenderness and passion but also of disappointed love and frustrated personal and career expectations". On the centennial of the release of Dubliners, Dan Barry of The New York Times called "The Dead" "just about the finest short story in the English language".

This story offers a critique of a society that has been gripped by a deadening paralysis of the spirit, while also offering a juxtaposed, memento mori vision of the enlivening effect that may be found when the living contemplate the lives of those who have died.

It has been suggested that the fictional character Gretta Conroy was inspired by Nora Barnacle, and that the fictional Michael Furey may have been partly inspired by Nora's memories of her own romantic relationships with two friends, Michael (Sonny) Bodkin and Michael Feeney, who both died in their teens.

Gabriel Conroy's name is borrowed from the novel Gabriel Conroy by Bret Harte, and Joyce's use of rhythm in the story reflects Harte's influence. Conroy's biography overlaps with Joyce's own; for example, he writes for the Daily Express, which Joyce himself also wrote for. Stanislaus Joyce, James Joyce's brother, interpreted Conroy as a hybrid of James Joyce and their father, John Stanislaus Joyce.

"The Dead" is "set on 6 January 1904, only five months before the date of Ulysses". The party described in the story is a celebration of Twelfth Night, or Epiphany.

== Adaptations ==
"The Dead" was adapted as a one-act play of the same name by Hugh Leonard in 1967.

Joyce Carol Oates's 1973 story, "The Dead", makes many allusions to Joyce's story.

In 1987, it was adapted into the film The Dead directed by John Huston, starring Anjelica Huston as Gretta Conroy and Donal McCann as Gabriel Conroy.

In 1990, the story was used as the core narrative for season 4, episode 10 of Thirtysomething titled "Happy New Year".

It is referenced in the 1995 Father Ted episode "Grant Unto Him Eternal Rest", in which the ending lines of the story are quoted.

In 1999, it was adapted into a Broadway musical by Richard Nelson and Shaun Davey. The original production starred Christopher Walken as Gabriel Conroy and won a Tony Award for Best Book of a Musical.

In 2012, playwright Frank McGuinness's two-act dramatic adaptation premiered at Dublin's Abbey Theatre, the National Theatre of Ireland, in a production starring Stanley Townsend as Gabriel and Derbhle Crotty as Gretta.

In 2019, the story was adapted into a Bengali film named Basu Poribar, starring Soumitra Chatterjee and Aparna Sen.

In 2024, the story is at the center of the Pedro Almodóvar film The Room Next Door. It is extensively referenced; and in one scene, a terminal cancer patient, aware of her coming end, reads out verbatim the last lines of "The Dead" describing the snow falling on Ireland. In the film's final scene the patient's friend, played by Julianne Moore, mourns her death by paraphrasing the same lines to refer to the snow falling on the house in upper New York State where her friend died.
