= Emily M. Keeler =

Canadian writer and editor (born 1987)

- Born: 16 July 1987 (age 38); Calgary, Alberta
- Occupations: Book critic, newspaper and magazine editor

Emily M. Keeler (born 16 July 1987) is a Canadian writer and editor.

== Biography ==
In October 2014, after serving as a contributing editor for Hazlitt, Keeler became the books editor of The National Post. She held the position until December 2015, when she left to take on a senior editor role at The Walrus. Keeler was elected to the Board of Directors of PEN Canada in 2016, taking on the role of Vice-President. That same year she left the Walrus to begin work as editor of the Coach House Book series Exploded Views. Her work has appeared in numerous publications, including The Globe and Mail, Maisonneuve and Quill & Quire.

Keeler is also known for live-tweeting her experience of being trapped inside the Yonge and Bloor location of Hudson's Bay Company after the store closed for the evening. In 2015 she served as a member of the CBC Radio q pop culture panel and contributed to the CBC's Out in The Open.

=== Little Brother ===
In 2012, she founded Little Brother Magazine, a twice-yearly publication of short stories, essays, and visual art. Having evolved from a Tumblr project, Keeler explained at the time of its release that she didn't want it referred to as a journal because "A journal is a dead thing." The magazine went on to win gold at the Canadian National Magazine Awards (CNMA) in 2013, for Jess Taylor's story, Pauls, in the Fiction category. Her dedication to keeping the publication as open as possible prompted Canada's trade publishing magazine, Quill & Quire, to name her as one of seven women in the book industry encouraging diversity. Six issues of Little Brother were released between 2012 and 2015.

=== David Gilmour interview ===
Keeler's September 2013 interview with Canadian novelist and University of Toronto professor David Gilmour garnered national attention due to his admission that he prefers not to teach female novelists. In an interview with the National Post, Gilmour claimed his comments were taken out of context, explaining to Mark Medley that Keeler was "a young woman who kind of wanted to make a little name for herself." Hazlitt responded by releasing the full transcript of Keeler's interview with Gilmour so that, as editor-in-chief Chris Frey explained, "readers can judge for themselves."
