= Marian Engel =

Canadian writer

- Born: May 24, 1933; Toronto, Ontario, Canada
- Died: February 16, 1985 (aged 51); Toronto, Ontario, Canada
- Occupations: Writer, activist, teacher
- Children: 2 children
- Writing career
- Genre: Fiction
- Subject: Women: mid-advanced years
- Notable work: Bear

Marian Ruth Engel OC (née Passmore; May 24, 1933 – February 16, 1985) was a Canadian novelist and a founding member of the Writers' Union of Canada. Her most famous and controversial novel was Bear (1976), a tale of erotic love between an archivist and a bear.

== Biography ==
Born May 24, 1933, in Toronto, Ontario, Engel lived the first years of her life in foster care before being adopted by Frederick Searle and Mary Elizabeth (Fletcher) Passmore. Her father taught auto mechanics, taking on positions at schools across southwestern Ontario. The family moved frequently and Engel spent time as a child in Port Arthur, Brantford, Galt, Hamilton and Sarnia.

After graduating from the Sarnia Collegiate Institute & Technical School, Engel obtained her Bachelor of Arts in Language Studies at McMaster University in 1955 and completed a Master of Arts in Canadian Literature at McGill University in 1957. Her M.A. supervisor while at McGill was author Hugh MacLennan, whom she corresponded with until her death. In 1960 Engel was awarded a Rotary Foundation Scholarship and spent a year studying French Literature at the Université d'Aix-Marseille in Aix-en Provence, France. Instead of returning to Canada the following year, she worked in England as a translator and began working on the unpublished manuscript Women Travelling Alone.

Engel met Howard Engel, a mystery novel writer and Canadian Broadcasting Corporation (CBC) radio producer in Canada, and married him in England in 1962. They returned to Toronto in 1964. The couple had two children, twins William Lucas Passmore and Charlotte Helen Arabella. While raising her young family, Marian began to pursue a writing career. Marian and Howard separated in 1975 and divorced in 1977.

Engel taught briefly (1957–58) at The Study in Montreal, as well as at McGill University, the University of Montana-Missoula and St. John's School in Cyprus. While in Montana, she coauthored an (unpublished) novel, The Pink Sphinx, with the Canadian philosopher Leslie Armour. Engel was writer-in-residence at the University of Alberta from 1977 to 1978 and served the same role at the University of Toronto from 1980 to 1982. From 1975-1977 she served on the City of Toronto Book Award Committee (an award she won in 1981 for Lunatic Villas) and the Canadian Book and Periodical Development Council.

=== Writers' rights advocacy ===
Engel was a dedicated activist for the rights of Canadian writers on the national and international stage. She was the first chair of the Writers' Union of Canada, established in 1973, with early meetings taking place in her Toronto home. Engel also helped instigate the Public Lending Right Commission as a trustee on the Toronto Public Library Board from 1975-1978 .

Pensions for writers and royalties from library loans were two of the issues Engel championed. In a 1974 Maclean's editorial, "Our Authors are Being Ripped Off," Engel outlined a vision for author compensation based on library circulation statistics. She argued that authors are expected "to live off that vapourous substance 'prestige'" and suggested that the uncompensated use of Canadian writers' work is a violation of copyright.

== Writing ==
Marian Engel's first published novel, No Clouds of Glory, was published in 1968. Later reissued in the United States as Sarah Bastard's Notebook (1974), the work challenged traditional notions of female identity by using a fragmented approach to the subjective narrative that mirrored entries in a notebook.

Engel's most famous and controversial novel was Bear (1976), a tale of erotic love between an archivist and a bear. Her editor at Harcourt Brace rejected the manuscript noting that: "Its relative brevity coupled with its extreme strangeness presents, I'm afraid, an insuperable obstacle in present circumstances." It was eventually published by McClelland & Stewart after being championed by Robertson Davies. It won the Governor General's Literary Award for Fiction in 1976.

Inside the Easter Egg (1975) and her posthumous The Tattooed Woman (1985) were collections of short stories. Some of these short stories had originally been written for Robert Weaver's CBC radio program Anthology. The novel JOANNE: The Last Days of a Modern Marriage was originally commissioned as a radio-novel by CBC for the program This Country in the Morning. In addition to her novels, Engel wrote two children's books; Adventures of Moon Bay Towers (1974) and My name is not Odessa Yarker (1977).

Engel was an avid journal keeper and she used her journals primarily as a repository for memories and details from which she drew for her fiction. In 1999, this material was edited and published as Marian Engel's Notebook: 'Ah, mon cahier, écoute...'.

From 1965 to 1985 she corresponded with literary peers and friends such as Hugh MacLennan, Robertson Davies, Dennis Lee, Margaret Atwood, Timothy Findley, Alice Munro, Margaret Laurence, Matt Cohen, Robert Weaver, Graeme Gibson and more. Some of this correspondence can be found in Dear Hugh, Dear Marian: the MacLennan-Engel Correspondence (1995) and Marian Engel: Life in Letters (2004)

=== Themes ===
Engel's writing illustrated contemporary life with a focus on the day to day experiences of women. She described her work as an exploration of "how you deal with an imperfect world when you have been brought up to look for perfection." The relationships between mothers and daughters, rooted in explorations of identify formation and subjective experiences, were a common theme. Doubled identities were also commonly used to illustrate the challenge of choosing between the push and pull of daily life – namely traditional gender roles and the imagined possibility of the "other."

Although Engel's writing garnered multiple awards, some viewed her focus on women and their search for self-fulfillment as one-note writing. Author Alice Munro disagreed, noting that Engel was one of the first to examine women's lives "at their most muddled", demonstrating it was possible to not only write but be published while writing about female experiences.

== Death ==
Engel died in Toronto, of cancer, on February 16, 1985. including Gwendolyn MacEwen and otehr writers read during a memorial service in her honour co-ordinated by Timothy Findley at The Music Gallery on February 28. Elizabeth and the Golden City, the novel Engel was working on at the time of her death, was left unfinished. It was incorporated into Marion and the Major: Engel's Elizabeth and the Golden City by Christyl Verduyn and published in 2010.

After her death the Writer's Development Trust of Canada instituted the $10,000 Marian Engel Award, which was presented annually to a woman writer in mid-career. The award was prompted by Engel's friends and colleagues who established an endowment fund in her name to recognize significant literary achievement by female writers under the age of 45. The first contributor to the fund was Margaret Atwood. The Engel and Findley Awards are no longer awarded separately, but were combined into the new Writers' Trust Notable Author Award as of 2008, subsequently renamed the Writers' Trust Engel Findley Award.

== Awards and honours ==
- Governor General's Award for English-language fiction (1976)
- Officer of the Order of Canada(1982)
- Toronto Book Award (1982)
- Toronto YWCA's Woman of Distinction in Arts (1984)

== Selected works ==
=== Books ===
- No Clouds of Glory. 1968 (reissued as Sarah Bastard's Notebook in 1974)
- The Honeyman festival; a novel. Toronto: Anansi. 1970. ISBN 9780887844133.
- Monodromos. [Toronto]: Anansi. 1973. ISBN 9780887844270.
- Adventure at Moon Bay Towers. Toronto: Clarke, Irwin. 1974. ISBN 9780772007179.
- Inside the easter egg. Toronto: Anansi. 1975. ISBN 9780887844362.
- Joanne : the last day of modern marriage. Don Mills, Ont.: Paperjacks. 1975. ISBN 9780773770843.
- Bear. Toronto: McClelland & Stewart. 1976. ISBN 9780771030802.
- My name is not Odessa Yarker. Toronto: Kids Can Press. 1977. ISBN 9780919964136.
- The glassy sea. Toronto: McClelland and Stewart-Bantam. 1979. ISBN 9780770415556.
- Lunatic villas. Toronto: McClelland and Stewart. 1981. ISBN 9780771030772.
- Islands of Canada (photographs by J. A. Kraulis). 1981
- The tattooed woman. Markham, Ont.: Penguin Books. 1985. ISBN 9780140081152.

=== Articles ===
- "Steps to the Mythic: "The Diviners" and "A Bird in the House"". Journal of Canadian Studies. 13 (3). 1978.
- "A plea to stop turning the knobs on writers' closets". The Globe and Mail. 17 November 1981.

=== Posthumous publications ===
- Verduyn, Christl, ed. Dear Marian, Dear Hugh: The MacLennan-Engel Correspondence. Ottawa: University of Ottawa Press, 1995.
- Verduyn, Christl, ed. Marian Engel's Notebook: 'Ah, mon cahier, écoute...'. Waterloo: Wilfrid Laurier University Press, 1999.
- Verduyn, Christl and Kathleen Garay, eds. Marian Engel: Life in Letters. Toronto: University of Toronto Press, 2004
- Verduyn, Christl, Marian and the Major: Engel's Elizabeth and the Golden City Montreal-Kingston: McGill Queen's University Press, 2010.
