= Joanne V. Creighton =

American academic administrator

16th President of Mount Holyoke College
- In office 1996–2010
- Preceded by: Elizabeth Topham Kennan
- Succeeded by: Lynn Pasquerella

Personal details
- Born: 1942 (age 83–84) Marinette, Wisconsin
- Education: University of Wisconsin–Madison; Harvard Graduate School of Education; University of Michigan
- Profession: Professor
- Website: Office of the President

Joanne Vanish Creighton (born 1942) is an American academic who served as the 16th President of Mount Holyoke College in South Hadley, Massachusetts, from 1996 to 2010. On August 10, 2011, the Haverford College Board of Managers named her interim President of Haverford College, replacing Stephen G. Emerson, who resigned.

== Background ==
Creighton was born in Marinette, Wisconsin. She graduated Phi Beta Kappa from the University of Wisconsin–Madison. She has a Master of Arts in Teaching from the Harvard Graduate School of Education, and a Ph.D. in English literature from the University of Michigan, Ann Arbor.

Creighton taught at Wayne State University from 1968 to 1985 and became dean of the College of Arts and Sciences at the University of North Carolina at Greensboro in 1985. She then served as the vice president for academic affairs and provost and professor of English from 1990 to 1994 at Wesleyan University and was Wesleyan's interim president from 1994 to 1995.

== Mount Holyoke College ==
Creighton joined Mount Holyoke College as president in 1996. She was chosen, in part, due to her history as an advocate for the tradition of American liberal arts colleges (Creighton has commented that such an education is "at its best, revolutionary. It transforms students; it awakens them to a fuller life of the mind.") As president, Creighton initiated the Plans for Mount Holyoke for 2003 and 2010 which "led to the creation of three new interdisciplinary centers: the Weissman Center for Leadership and the Liberal Arts, the McCulloch Center for Global Initiatives, and the Center for the Environment." This involvement would later be credited as leading to the further development of Mount Holyoke: "it is a testament to the cohesive sense of purpose articulated in two strategic plans, shared across the institution, and so carefully nurtured by Joanne Creighton's artful leadership."

While at Mount Holyoke, Creighton also became involved with Women's Education Worldwide, an alliance of institutions of higher education whose goal is to advance women's education around the globe. This international initiative was founded in 2003 by Mount Holyoke and Smith Colleges, two of the original Seven Sisters (colleges) of U.S. higher education.

Creighton handled the widely publicized suspension of Professor Joseph J. Ellis, a historian who admitted lying to students about having served in Vietnam. He was suspended from the college for a year.

On February 25, 2009, Creighton announced that she would step down as president at the end of the 2009–2010 academic year. On May 6, 2010, Leslie Anne Miller (Board of Trustees) announced that the New Residence Hall would thereby be named Creighton Hall (colloquially known as "NoJo" and "SoJo" or "NoJoJo" and "SoJoJo" halls, in reference to the president's common nickname among students, JoJo).

=== Women's colleges ===
Creighton has written extensively on the subject of women's colleges. She suggests a link in a 21 May 2007 article for The Boston Globe between Drew Gilpin Faust's (a woman's college graduate) new role as Harvard University's first female president and the continuing importance of women's colleges. She also compares women's colleges to Virginia Woolf's, A Room of One's Own. This article was taken from a longer paper, "A Tradition of Their Own or, If a Woman Can Now Be President of Harvard, Why Do We Still Need Women's Colleges?" delivered at the Harvard Graduate School of Education on April 16, 2007.

== Haverford College ==
On August 10, 2011, Haverford College announced that Creighton would serve as its Interim President.

== Scholarship ==
The author of four books of literary criticism on William Faulkner, Joyce Carol Oates, and Margaret Drabble, Creighton has also written a number of book reviews as well as op-eds and articles on issues facing higher education and women's colleges. In 2018 she published a memoir.

=== Select works ===
- The Educational Odyssey of a Woman College President (2018), ISBN 978-1625343987
- Joyce Carol Oates: Novels of the Middle Years (1992)
- Margaret Drabble (1985)
- Joyce Carol Oates (1979)
- William Faulkner's Craft of Revision: The Snopes Trilogy, the Unvanquished and Go Down Moses (1977)
- Letters, Speeches, and Articles by Joanne V. Creighton
