= Night-Side (short story) =

- Short story by Joyce Carol Oates
- Country: United States
- Language: English

Publication
- Published in: Queen's Quarterly
- Publication date: Autumn 1977

"Night-Side" is a short story by Joyce Carol Oates, first published in Queen's Quarterly in 1977. The story was first collected in Night-Side: Eighteen Tales (1977) by Vanguard Press.

== Plot ==
"Night-Side" is written in the form of a diary, presented in ten dated entries. Jarvis Williams, the narrator, is a 19th century Harvard professor.

6 February 1887. Quincy, Massachusetts. Montague House.

Professor Williams, and his older associate and mentor at Harvard, Dr. Perry Moore, are members of the Society for Psychical Research which conducts scientific investigations into claims of paranormal phenomena. Both men have Epicurean tastes and lifestyles. They attend a seance by a local medium, the matronly and thoroughly respectable widow "Mrs. A." She appears to make contact with messengers from the spirit world that address the attendees at the seance. Afterwards, in consultation with Moore—an inveterate paranormal skeptic and anti–occultist—assures Williams that Mrs. A is a self-deluding but harmless fraud. Moore, however, argues that a skilled medium may be capable of achieving mental telepathy, though as yet not scientifically confirmed.

19 March 1887. Cambridge. 11 P.M.

Williams continues to be troubled by implications of the February seance. He formulates an outline of possible explanations: outright fraud; non-fraudulent but naturalistic; non-fraudulent and paranormal, and a fourth possibility: that the medium, her clients, and the investigators, are all insane.

Moore and Williams attend a second seance at Mrs. A's parlor. In a trance, the medium channels a spirit, "Brandon", who speaks directly to Dr. Moore in the most painful and intimate terms. Moore cries out in agony to the spirit. Deeply agitated by the communication, he staggers from the parlor, weeping uncontrollably.

25 March 1887. Cambridge.

Williams is concerned by the implications of the recent seance, in particular Dr. Moore's attempt to engage with the spirit world. Moore's professional reputation may be exposed to ridicule by the scientific establishment. Williams is astonished when Moore confesses to him he is now a fervent convert to the occult and its doctrine that there is life after death.

31 March 1887. Cambridge. 4 A.M.

Dr. Perry Moore's increasingly eccentric social behavior becomes alarming, leading people to believe he is publicly drunk. For the first time in decades he attends church and laughs hysterically during the sermon. Williams fears for his sanity.

4 April 1887. Cambridge.

Willams has an exchange with a senior figure in the Harvard community, Professor James. Williams obliquely inquires as to whether an anti-spiritualist as Perry Moore might be vulnerable to the paranormal. Professor James suggests the condition may merely be a form of temporary insanity. Williams has become insomniac and is increasingly irritable with his wife and children.

10 April 1887. Boston. St. Aidan's Episcopal Church.

Williams attends the funeral service for Dr. Perry Moore, dead of a massive stroke at age forty-three.

17 April 1887. Seven Hills, New Hampshire.

Seeking a peaceful weekend sojourn, Williams visits an elderly former colleague. During an afternoon nap, he is startled awake by some unknown presence. A voice asks him several imperative questions regarding the nature of God and Fate.

25 April 1887. Cambridge.

Williams recalls the events on the day of Perry Moore's death, during which the then mad professor had stridently and insultingly denounced the members of the Society for Psychical Research at a meeting. Willam concludes that Moore died of madness.

19 June 1887. Boston.

Williams is turning over his Harvard duties to younger graduates: he is retiring. As to inquiries regarding his close relationship with Dr. Moore, he denies any. He further denies knowing any of the antecedents to the anti-social behavior of the late professor.

8 July 1887. Mount Desert Island, Maine.

Williams' last entry reveals that he resides at an expensive island resort—a mental hospital. He suffers from nightmares that appear as phantasmagoria dominated by historical literary and scientific figures and their works. Williams is repeatedly visited by a spirit named Jarvis, who demands his attention.

== Reception ==
Literary critic John Romano in the New York Times observes that "Night-Side" does not qualify as a "literal ghost story," but resonates with the 19th century practitioners of the genre, namely Edgar Allan Poe and Nathaniel Hawthorne. This "clinical study" of the protagonist's descent into madness "makes sound psychological sense."

== Retrospective appraisal ==
Literary critic Robert Phillips, writing in Commonweal, reports that the Night-Side collection "contains some of the best work of one of America's best storytellers. Singling out "Night-Side" for special mention, Phillipa wrote "Anyone interested in Oates must read the title story, which is as gripping as a thriller."

Noting that "Night-side" and "A Theory of Knowledge" serve as bookends in the collection's table of contents, critic Greg Johnson observes that these tales "make the most explicit use of Gothic conventions."

By enclosing the collection within these Gothic borders, Oates again suggests the sensibility that will, in differing ways, infiltrate and control the entire volume.

== Theme ==
Dr. Moore's radical transformation from an inveterate anti-spiritualist to that of a true-believer in the paranormal provides the impetus for his colleague Dr. Williams' own struggle to reject or rationalize the occult. Literary critic Greg Johnson writes:

Throughout Night-Side collection, Oates explores the extreme psychological risk of confronting the 'other,' whether in supernatural form, as in the title story "Night-Side," or in the haunting visions of an alien and unacknowledged self.

Johnson reminds readers that "the theme of the doppelganger, the dark alter ego, is present throughout all Oates's work."

== Sources ==
- Johnson, Greg. 1994. Joyce Carol Oates: A Study of the Short Fiction. Twayne's studies in short fiction; no. 57. Twayne Publishers, New York. ISBN 0-8057-0857-X
- Phillips, Robert. Night-Side. Commonweal, in Critical Essays on Joyce Carol Oates. 1979. pp. 42–43: by Linda W. Wagner. G. K. Hall & Co., Boston, Massachusetts. ISBN 0-8161-8224-8
- Romano, John. 1977. "A Way With Madness" The New York Times, October 23, 1977. https://www.nytimes.com/1977/10/23/archives/a-way-with-madness-madness.html Retrieved 5 October 2023.
- Oates, Joyce Carol. 1977. Night-Side: Eighteen Tales. Vanguard Press, New York. ISBN 9780814907931
