= The Translation =

- Short story by Joyce Carol Oates
- Country: United States
- Language: English

Publication
- Published in: TriQuarterly
- Publication date: Fall 1977

"The Translation" is a short story by Joyce Carol Oates, appearing in TriQuarterly (Fall 1977). The work was first collected in Night-Side: Eighteen Tales (1977) by Vanguard Press.

== Plot ==
"The Translation" is told in the third-person omniscient point-of-view. The focal character is Oliver.

The 40-something Oliver is an American lexicographer who is attending conferences on the subject at conferences in an unnamed European Eastern bloc country. His translator, Liebert, is a younger local man with whom he forms an intimate camaraderie. At one such gathering, Oliver, a normally undemonstrative and restrained individual, is introduced to a young woman and university student, Alisa. He falls in love during their 15-minute exchange facilitated by his translator. She reputedly speaks Italian and German, but not a word of English. According to Leibert, she is also an accomplished violinist. When Oliver presses for information on her profile, he is informed that Alisa is separated from his husband, an elderly doctor.

Concerned that the woman has a troubled existence, Oliver fantasizes about rescuing her from a repressive political state. Designated a "cultural emissary" by the US State Department, he feels emboldened to do so.

Another meeting with Alisa is arranged...and another. At each rendezvous, presided over by the ever-present Liebert, Oliver finds Alisa's responses to his questions and comments increasingly charming, and the depth of her insights impressive. He declares his love for her through his translator.

Through Leibert, a tryst is arranged at Alisa's apartment. Money exchanges hands and he spends one night with her. The next morning Oliver discovers that Leibert has been replaced with another male translator, not to his liking. Shortly thereafter, he prepares to depart for America. At the airport he cries out in despair: "What will I do for the rest of my life...?"

== Theme ==
Describing the premise of "The Translation" as "intriguing", critic Robert Phillips, the protagonist is blinded by his desperate desire for his beloved, who persona is filtered and conditioned by a scheming translator.

Literary critic Greg Johnson identifies "The Translation" as a Jamesian-influenced story that reworks the American author's "international theme". The least Gothic of the works in Night-Side volume, "The Translation" involves not supernatural elements but rather "a dark alter ego"—the theme of the doppelganger.

The protagonist, Oliver, is confronted by "a painful and unexpected self-recognition", namely, his failure to discover "love and a meaningful life". The only "supernatural" elements in the narrative are the exquisitely deceptive translations that conjure up the object of Oliver's infatuation: the largely fictional Alisa. So penetrating are Leibert's "false translations" they conger up Oliver's idealization of Alisa: "Surely it was magic."

== Sources ==
- Johnson, Greg. 1994. Joyce Carol Oates: A Study of the Short Fiction. Twayne's studies in short fiction; no. 57. Twayne Publishers, New York. ISBN 0-8057-0857-X
- Oates, Joyce Carol. 1977. Night-Side: Eighteen Tales. Vanguard Press, New York. ISBN 9780814907931
- Phillips, Robert. Night-Side. Commonweal, in Critical Essays on Joyce Carol Oates. 1979. pp. 42–43: by Linda W. Wagner. G. K. Hall & Co., Boston, Massachusetts. ISBN 0-8161-8224-8
