= Night-Side: Eighteen Tales =

1977 collection of short fiction by Joyce Carol Oates

- First edition
- Author: Joyce Carol Oates
- Language: English
- Publisher: Vanguard Press
- Publication date: 1977
- Publication place: United States
- Media type: Print (hardback & paperback)
- Pages: 370
- ISBN: 9780814907931

Night-Side: Eighteen Tales is a collection of 18 works of short fiction by Joyce Carol Oates published by Vanguard Press in 1977.

== Stories ==
Those stories first appearing in literary journals are indicated.

- "Night-Side" (Queen's Quarterly, Autumn, 1977)
- "The Thaw" (Viva, February 1977)
- "The Murder"
- "Daisy" (limited edition by Black Sparrow Press, 1977)
- "Exile"
- "Famine Country" (Yale Review, Summer 1977)
- "Fatal Woman" (The Fiddlehead, Summer 1977)
- "Further Confessions" (Chicago Review, Spring 1977)
- "The Translation" (TriQuarterly, Fall 1977)
- "The Blessing"
- "The Giant Woman" (Kansas Quarterly, Winter 1976)
- "The Widows" (Hudson Review, Spring 1975)
- "The Dungeon" (Iowa Review, Winter 1975)
- "The Sacrifice" (Fiction International, 1975)
- "The Snowstorm" (Mademoiselle, September 1974, as "The Snow-Storm")
- "The Lover" (Exile, 1974)
- "Bloodstains" (Harper's Bazaar, August 1971)
- "A Theory of Knowledge"

== Reception and analysis ==
Literary critic Greg Johnson notes that these stories are designated as "tales" in the tradition of Nathaniel Hawthorne and Edgar Allan Poe: "Night-Side inhabits a realm of storytelling with its own distinct conventions. Unlike the realistic, carefully plotted short story, the tale allows the narrative freedom of brisk pacing, improbable events, and idiosyncratic characters and settings."

Literary critic John Romano, writing in The New York Times, also emphasizes that Oates registers these stories as "tales," evoking the Gothic works of Hawthorne and Poe, as well "lurid mass market paperbacks" found in contemporary pulp fiction. Romano praises Oates for her "handy competence" in depicting "borderline insanity" and creating "a gallery of people haunted, spooked, driven mad or victimized in general by invasions from outside the sane, rational borders of consciousness."

Romano contrasts the work in Night-Side with Oates's earlier short fiction that deals with human suffering:

If there's a difference between the strange mental worlds in this volume and those Miss Oates has taken us to before, it is that the pain pervading the new book is peculiarly lonely and private...In Night-Side's nearly 400 pages, there's hardly an instance of two people understanding one another...

== Theme ==
The stories are unified by interrelated themes which she names in the collection's epigraph, Walt Whitman's poem "A Clear Midnight:"

This is thy hour O soul,

thy free flight into the wordless,

Away from books, away from art,

the day erased, the lesson done

Thee fully forth emerging, silent, gazing,

pondering the themes thou lovest best:

Night, sleep, death and the stars.

In fact the stories are less concerned with everyday reality than with the "night-side" of the human mind, the area psychologists usually refer a to as "the unconscious," and its effects on a character's life.

== Sources ==
- Johnson, Greg. 1994. Joyce Carol Oates: A Study of the Short Fiction. Twayne's studies in short fiction; no. 57. Twayne Publishers, New York. ISBN 0-8057-0857-X
- Oates, Joyce Carol. 1986. Night-Side: Eighteen Tales. Vanguard Press, New York. ISBN 978-0814907931
- Romano, John. 1977. "A Way With Madness" The New York Times, October 23, 1977. https://www.nytimes.com/1977/10/23/archives/a-way-with-madness-madness.html Retrieved 5 October 2023.
