= The Sacrifice (short story) =

- Short story by Joyce Carol Oates
- Country: United States
- Language: English

Publication
- Published in: Fiction International
- Publication date: 1975

"The Sacrifice" is a short story by Joyce Carol Oates, originally appearing in Fiction International (1975). The work was first collected in Night-Side: Eighteen Tales (1977) by Vanguard Press.

== Plot ==
Dr. Reaume is a 61 year old successful therapist of over thirty years. He is happily married with one son and a grandson; he has many casual friendships as well as respectful professional contacts. He keeps himself fit and enjoys excellent health despite working 10-12 hour days. He has been awarded a special citation from the American Academy of Humanistic Sciences. Reumer loves his life and career.

Dr. Reumes demeanor with his clients is genial, concerned without seeming alarmed, and maintaining a benign and gently paternalistic tone. His patients have the highest regard for him. The doctor relishes his role as healer, but is modest with respect to his talents. Dr. Reaume's own sense of normalcy and adequacy in his life allows him to remain interested, but emotionally aloof from the bewildered, damaged and suffering humanity he treats.

A young woman, who knows of Dr. Reaume by reputation, approaches on the street and begs to make an appointment: she is suffering from morbid dreams. The doctor recommends her to a younger colleague. Months later she contacts Reaume, confessing she had not sought the treatment and suffers from insomnia. He consents to treat her. During the session, the intelligent and attractive woman disgorges a litany of apologies and describes a horrible dream sequence: A group of priestesses in robes prepare a panicked and pleading man for a ritualistic beheading: the man has the face of Reaume. The client divulges that she was one of the priestesses, helpless to intervene to stop the killing. Fully in his domain, Reaume received this episode with aplomb, assuring the woman he felt no disgust and would proceed to deal frankly to discover the source of her suffering.

After the session, Reaume encountered his 11-year-old grandson, Timmy, outside the office. The doctor suspects the boy skipped school that day. Timmy addresses his grandfather in a vulgar tone, using swear words. The boy goes upstairs, ignoring Reaume's concerned inquiries. The grandfather loves Timmy and the son who is the father, the later intellectually brilliant but emotionally arrested in his teenage years. Reaume is conflict aversive with his entire family and is content to retire in isolation that risks an unpleasant encounter. He eschews arguments with his fellow psychiatrists. Yet he congratulates himself on not judging too harshly their eccentricities. Remaining aloof from his family, he lives like a bachelor.

When the woman he treated calls again, she pleads with him to come to her home: she is in acute distress. Reaume at first declines, then consents, suddenly desperate to see her. On his way, the sordid events in his own domestic life begin to converge on his mind; his mental equilibrium begins to unravel. Walking through a black ghetto, he is jeered by the local children, who swarm around him. He almost collapses. A black youth looms over him. Reaume addresses the boy and offers his hand, asking: "didn't you call me, don't you need me, can I be of service to you…"

== Theme ==
Literary critic Robert Phillips places "The Sacrifice" among Oates's themes "in which alter-egos or exterior projections of interior conditions lead the protagonist to their fate."

Dr. Reaume's carefully crafted self-image, distinguishing himself from the disorderly and sordid lives of his patients, is exposed as self-serving complacency by a man who believes he has "guided his life perfectly." Literary critic Greg Johnson writes:

Even though Dr. Reaume has spent a lifetime congratulating himself on his eminent sanity and his ability to transcend the psychological snarls his patients suffer, his complacency is itself revealed as a delusion…

Dr. Reaume's effort to isolate his existence is at the thematic center of the story: "Oates critiques the intellectual hubris that attempts to transcend nature, to produce systematic explanations —whether philosophical, psychological, or religious—of an inexplicably complex reality."

== Sources ==
- Johnson, Greg. 1994. Joyce Carol Oates: A Study of the Short Fiction. Twayne's studies in short fiction; no. 57. Twayne Publishers, New York. ISBN 0-8057-0857-X
- Oates, Joyce Carol. 1977. Night-Side: Eighteen Tales. Vanguard Press, New York. ISBN 9780814907931
- Phillips, Robert. Night-Side. The Commonweal, in Critical Essays on Joyce Carol Oates. 1979. pp. 42–43: by Linda W. Wagner. G. K. Hall & Co., Boston, Massachusetts. ISBN 0-8161-8224-8
