= Daisy (short story) =

- Short story by Joyce Carol Oates
- First limited edition cover
- Country: United States
- Language: English

Publication
- Publisher: Black Sparrow Press
- Publication date: 1977
- Pages: 34

"Daisy" is a short story by Joyce Carol Oates, first appearing in a special limited edition by Black Sparrow Press in 1977. The work was first collected in Night-Side: Eighteen Tales (1977) by Vanguard Press.

== Plot ==
"Daisy" is written from a third-person omniscient point-of-view. The focal character is Francis Bonham. The story is initially set in New York City, then in various locations in the Mid-Atlantic States. The story concerns the unusually close and obsessive relationship between Bonham and his intellectually gifted but developmentally arrested daughter Daisy Bonham.

From birth, Daisy has been largely raised by Bonham who molds every aspect of his daughter's education and socialization. He has established numerous rituals that have contributed to an intimate relationship between father and daughter. A spoiled child, Daisy is at liberty to tease and challenge him within limits. She is utterly dependent on his paternalistic control. Bonham scrutinizes and furtively documents all of her activities in notebooks.

Bonham's devotion to Daisy provokes resistance. She has run away a number of times, and Bonham considers having her institutionalized for periods to correct her behavior. Bonham appears to be an emotional doppelganger of his daughter. Medical professionals have warned Bonham that he spends too much time with Daisy, contributing to her violent outbursts after her mother's death. At the age of fourteen Daisy begins consuming alcohol. She accuses her father of being able to read her mind.

Bonham is compelled to attend a ceremonial dinner in his honor to collect a $1500 prize. Loath to take Daisy with him, he tells her he will be in his study all evening. Daisy discovers the ruse, and wanders into the streets in the winter night in a robe and slippers. When police attempt to detain her, she resists and threatens them. Bonham is forced by the authorities to have her committed to a hospital. Daisy is subjected to injections and electroshock therapy.

After her release, father and daughter flee to various refuges provided by Bonham's wealthy associates. At first Daisy seems to recover, but is now decidedly passive after her treatment. Obese from overeating, she has dreams about her deceased mother and lashes out against Bonham. At a resort restaurant the pair have a shouting match and Daisy dashes away to their room. Her retreat to the apartment, rather than to the path towards the sea cliffs reassures Bonham. That afternoon father and daughter resume their neurotic routines.

== Theme ==
Literary critic Greg Johnson reports that the narrative in "Daisy" is "loosely based" on the relationship between author James Joyce and his daughter Lucia, who suffered from schizophrenia.

"Daisy" probes the border between sanity and insanity, focusing on the clash between two incompatible ways of viewing and knowing the world.

Johnson regards the work as "an allegory for the artist's riddling relationship to the multidimensional he attempts, and inevitably fails, to control through his art." Johnson adds: "Like many of the stories in Night-Side, 'Daisy' is notable for its length and ambition" and, quoting Oates, "in developing stories that are really miniature novellas: stories that deal with a person's entire life, greatly condensed and focused."

Literary critic Robert Phillips notes the dilemma that arises when an ostensibly healthy family member is confronted with a loved one who is diagnosed as mentally ill: "They are asked to play God."

== Sources ==
- Johnson, Greg. 1994. Joyce Carol Oates: A Study of the Short Fiction. Twayne's studies in short fiction; no. 57. Twayne Publishers, New York. ISBN 0-8057-0857-X
- Oates, Joyce Carol. 1977. Night-Side: Eighteen Tales. Vanguard Press, New York. ISBN 9780814907931
- Phillips, Robert. "Night-Side." The Commonweal in Critical Essays on Joyce Carol Oates. p. 42. G. K. Hall & Co., Boston, Massachusetts. ISBN 0-8161-8224-8
