= Nightside =

Nightside or Night-Side may refer to:

- Nightside with Dan Rea, talk radio show hosted by Dan Rea
- The Nightside, hosted by Mark Elliot
- NBC Nightside, an American overnight television news program on NBC
- Nightside (novel series), a series of fantasy-noir novels by Simon Green
- Nightside (comics), a fictional character in the Marvel Universe
- Nightside (film), a 1980 television pilot starring Doug McClure
- Night side of a planetary body, divided from the daylit side by the terminator (solar)
- Night-Side (short story), a short story by Joyce Carol Oates
- Night-Side: Eighteen Tales, a collection of short fiction by Joyce Carol Oates
