= The Parca and the Angel of Death =

Painting by Gustave Moureau

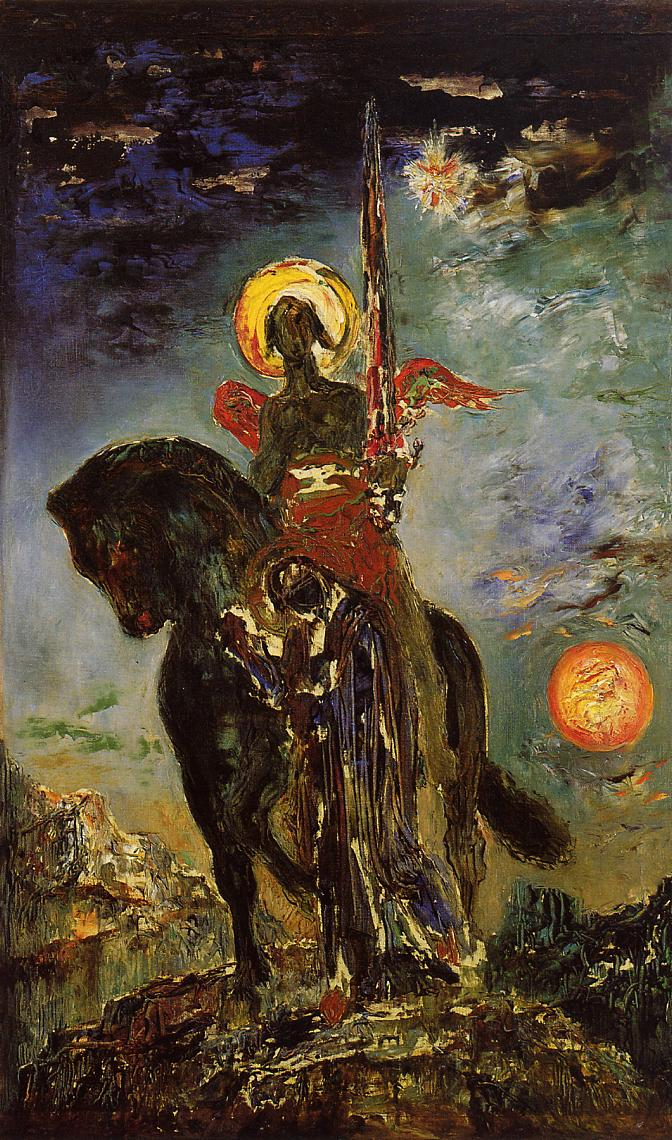
- Artist: Gustave Moreau
- Year: 1890
- Medium: Oil on canvas
- Movement: Symbolism
- Dimensions: 110 cm × 67 cm (43 in × 26 in)
- Location: Musée national Gustave Moreau, Paris

The Parca and the Angel of Death is an 1890 oil-on-canvas painting produced by the French Symbolist artist Gustave Moreau after the death of his companion Alexandrine Dureux. It is held at the Musée national Gustave Moreau, in Paris.

It shows the Moira or Parca Atropos leading the Angel of Death's black horse. The Angel holds a large sword and has a halo and red wings but no face. In the background is a desolated landscape with a red moon and a waning glowing sun.

The painting consists of large flows of paint, sometimes superimposed, sometimes ground up and thick. A true meditation on death, produced just at the time Moreau retired from painting, its daring use of colour made it a precursor of fauvism fifteen years later, particularly the work of Georges Rouault, his pupil and the first curator of the musée Gustave-Moreau.

== History ==
From 1890 onwards Moreau retired and produced works of a more autobiographical character, such as The Parca. His "best and only friend" Alexandrine Dureux had died and he painted the work in her memory at the same time as Orpheus Weeping Upon Eurydice's Tomb In Heures, Francis Poictevin wrote of the work:

At the summit of a moor at the foot of which rises a cadaverous moon, a moon of an evil hour, a horse mounted by the angel of death, some skinned obscure figure, seemingly skinless, a bloody candle in his hand, this shadowy horse, the fevered eye, the head turning quivering and begging strangely towards its guide, a suspicious looking old woman buried in her mantle, as he advances slightly magically with his quickset bridle, above all sniffing the abyss all around him

The work evokes the idea of grief. Atropos, the most terrible of the three Parcae, was the one who cut the thread of life, while the Angel of Death could well be one of the Four Horsemen of the Apocalypse. Moreau thus mixes pagan and Christian traditions in a perfect syncretism typical of his painting. As often in Moreau's work, nature is empathetic, with the setting sun an evocation of death. His treatment is almost expressionist, especially in its use of black, the quick and scraped application of paint and the reddening tones.
