= Gantner =

Gantner is a German surname. Notable people with the surname include:

- Carrillo Gantner (born 1944), Victorian cultural leader and philanthropist
- Ed Gantner (1959–1990), American professional wrestler and American football player
- Jim Gantner (born 1953), former Major League Baseball player
- Joseph Gantner (1896—1988), Swiss art historian
- Martin Gantner, German operatic baritone
- Matei Gantner (born 1934), Romanian table tennis player
- Neilma Gantner (1922—2015), Australian philanthropist and author
- Rick Gantner (born 1961), German born American professional wrestler
