= Karl Shapiro =

American poet

- Born: Karl Jay Shapiro; November 10, 1913; Baltimore, Maryland, U.S.
- Died: May 14, 2000 (aged 86); New York City, New York, U.S.
- Education: University of Virginia; Peabody Institute; Johns Hopkins University
- Occupations: Poet, essayist
- Spouse(s): Evalyn Katz (1945–1967); Teri Kovach (1967-1982); Sophie Wilkins (1984-2000)

Karl Jay Shapiro (November 10, 1913 – May 14, 2000) was an American poet. He was awarded the Pulitzer Prize for Poetry in 1945 for his collection V-Letter and Other Poems. He was appointed the fifth Poet Laureate Consultant in Poetry to the Library of Congress in 1946.

Shapiro served in the Pacific Theater as a United States Army company clerk during World War II.

== Biography ==
Shapiro was born and initially raised in Baltimore, Maryland. After spending much of his childhood and adolescence in Chicago, Illinois, the family returned to Baltimore, where he completed his secondary education at Baltimore City College. He briefly attended the University of Virginia during the 1932–1933 academic year, and wrote about it in a critical poem called "University", which noted that "to hurt the Negro and avoid the Jew is the curriculum." His first volume of poetry was published by a family friend at the behest of his uncle in 1935. After continuing his studies at the Peabody Institute (where he majored in piano performance), he attended Johns Hopkins University on a scholarship from 1937 to 1939. In 1940, he enrolled in a library science school associated with Baltimore's Enoch Pratt Free Library, where he was also employed.

Shapiro wrote poetry in the Pacific Theater while he served there as a United States Army company clerk during World War II. Throughout the conflict, he engaged in near-daily correspondence with his fiancée and first wife, Evalyn Katz (m. 1945–1967), who moved to New York City to act as his literary agent in 1942. In this capacity, Katz facilitated the publication of much of his early oeuvre. His collection V-Letter and Other Poems, written while Shapiro was stationed in New Guinea, was awarded the Pulitzer Prize for Poetry in 1945, while Shapiro was still in the military. From 1946 to 1947, he served as Consultant in Poetry to the Library of Congress, succeeding Louise Bogan; this position was reclassified by Congress in 1985 as the Poet Laureate Consultant in Poetry to the Library of Congress.

Poems from his earlier books display a mastery of formal verse with a modern sensibility that viewed such topics as automobiles, houseflies, and drug stores as worthy of attention. In 1963, the poet/critic Randall Jarrell praised Shapiro's work:

Karl Shapiro's poems are fresh and young and rash and live; their hard clear outlines, their flat bold colors create a world like that of a knowing and skillful neoprimitive painting, without any of the confusion or profundity of atmosphere, of aerial perspective, but with notable visual and satiric force. The poet early perfected a style, derived from Auden but decidedly individual, which he has not developed in later life but has temporarily replaced with the clear Rilke-like rhetoric of his Adam and Eve poems, the frankly Whitmanesque convolutions of his latest work. His best poem--poems like "The Leg", "Waitress", "Scyros", "Going to School", "Cadillac"--have a real precision, a memorable exactness of realization, yet they plainly come out of life's raw hubbub, out of the disgraceful foundations, the exciting and disgraceful surfaces of existence.

In his later work, he repudiated the epochal influence of Ezra Pound (whom he voted against in the inaugural Bollingen Prize deliberations in 1949, citing the poet's antisemitism) and T.S. Eliot, drawing instead upon the stylistic innovations of the Beat Generation and its progenitors, including Walt Whitman, D.H. Lawrence, Dylan Thomas, Henry Miller and William Carlos Williams. However, Morris Dickstein would later opine that his "maverick role seemed strictly literary" vis-à-vis the alternative lifestyles of such Sixties "culture heroes" as Norman Mailer and Allen Ginsberg. Nevertheless, this immersion led to experimentation with more open forms, beginning with The Bourgeois Poet (1964) and continuing with White-Haired Lover (1968). His interest in formal verse and prosody led to his writing multiple books on the subject, including the long poem Essay on Rime (1945), A Bibliography of Modern Prosody (1948), and A Prosody Handbook (with Robert Beum, 1965; reissued 2006). In his 1948 lecture, Poetry and Technique, the American poet Eli Siegel described Karl Shapiro as one of the "technique boys," poets who were highly skilled at structures of prosody. His Selected Poems appeared in 1968. Shapiro also published one novel, Edsel (1971), and a two-volume memoir (1988–1990).

Although he never completed his undergraduate degree, Shapiro returned to Johns Hopkins as an associate professor of writing from 1947 to 1950. Based again in Chicago, he served as the full-time editor of Poetry from 1950 to 1956. During this period, he served as a visiting professor at the University of California, Berkeley (1955–1956) and as a visiting fellow at Indiana University (1956–1957). Thereafter, he returned to academia in earnest, serving as a professor of English and editor of Prairie Schooner at the University of Nebraska for a decade (1956–1966). After briefly joining the faculty of the University of Illinois Chicago from 1966 to 1968, he moved to the University of California, Davis, where he became professor emeritus of English in 1985.

His other works include Person, Place and Thing (1942), the libretto to Hugo Weisgall's opera The Tenor (1950; with Ernst Lert), To Abolish Children (1968) and The Old Horsefly (1993). Shapiro also received the 1969 Bollingen Prize, sharing the award with John Berryman.

== Death and legacy ==
By 1984, Shapiro began to divide his time between California and an apartment in the Manhattan Valley section of the Upper West Side of Manhattan, where he initially spent at least half the year. He became a full-time resident of New York in 1994. In 1985, Richard Tillinghast of The New York Times Book Review asserted that Shapiro had become "more a name than a presence," and he obtained a settlement from the American Medical Association after the organization "mistakenly included him in a list of writers who had committed suicide." As early as 1978, Shapiro had been erroneously characterized as a "late U.S. poet" in a New York Times crossword puzzle clue.

He died at a New York City hospice, aged 86, on May 14, 2000. Survivors included his third wife, Sophie Wilkens (m. 1985), along with three grandchildren and one great-grandchild. More recent editions of his work include The Wild Card: Selected Poems Early and Late (1998) and the John Updike-edited Selected Poems (2003). His last work, Coda: Last Poems, (2008) was published in a volume organized posthumously by editor Robert Phillips. The poems, divided into three sections according to love poems to Wilkens, poems concerning roses, and other various poems, were discovered in the drawers of Shapiro's desk by his wife two years after his death.

== Awards ==
- Jeanette S Davis Prize and Levinson Prize, both from Poetry, 1942
- Contemporary Poetry Prize, 1943
- American Academy of Arts and Letters grant, 1944
- Guggenheim Fellowships, 1944, 1953
- Pulitzer Prize for Poetry, 1945
- Shelley Memorial Prize, 1946
- Consultant in Poetry to the Library of Congress, 1946–1947
- Indiana University School of Letters Fellowship, 1956–1957
- Eunice Tietjens Memorial Prize, 1961
- Oscar Blumenthal Prize, Poetry, 1963
- Bollingen Prize, 1969
- Robert Kirsch Award, Los Angeles Times, 1989
- Charity Randall Citation, 1990
- Fellow in American Letters, Library of Congress

== Bibliography ==
=== Poetry ===
- Poems (1935)
- Person, Place, and Thing (1942)
- The Place of Love (1943)
- V-Letter and Other Poems (1944)
- Essay on Rime (1945)
- Trial of a Poet (1947)
- Poems of a Jew (1950)
- Poems 1940-1953 (1953)
- The Bourgeois Poet (1964)
- Selected Poems (Random House, 1968)
- White Haired Lover (1968)
- Adult Bookstore (1976)
- Collected Poems, 1940–1978 (1978)
- New and Selected Poems, 1940–1987 (1988)
- The Old Horsefly (1993)
- The Wild Card: Selected Poems, Early and Late (1998)
- Selected Poems (Library of America, 2003), edited by John Updike
- Coda: Last Poems (2008)

=== Memoir ===
- The Younger Son (1988)
- Reports of My Death (1990)

=== Essays ===
- The Poetry Wreck (1975)
- To Abolish Children and Other Essays (1968)
- A Primer for Poets (1965)
- In Defense of Ignorance (1960)
- Randall Jarrell (1967)
- Start With the Sun: Studies in the Whitman Tradition, with James E. Miller Jr., and Bernice Slote (1963)
- Prose Keys to Modern Poetry (1962)

=== Novels ===
- Edsel (1971)
