= Warbasse =

Warbasse is a surname. Notable people with the surname include:

- James Peter Warbasse (1866-1957), American surgeon and advocate for cooperatives
- Larry Warbasse (born 1990), American cyclist

== See also ==
- Amalgamated Warbasse Houses, a co-operative housing development on Coney Island
