= A Theory of Knowledge =

- Short story by Joyce Carol Oates
- Country: United States
- Language: English

Publication
- Published in: Night-Side: Eighteen Tales
- Publication date: 1977

"A Theory of Knowledge" is a short story by Joyce Carol Oates first collected in Night-Side: Eighteen Tales (1977) by Vanguard Press.

== Plot ==
The story is told from a third-person omniscient point-of-view. Reuben Weber is the focal character. The setting is the rural and isolated mountains during the summer.

Professor emeritus Reuben Weber is 77 years old and in declining health. A stroke survivor and now semi-immobilized, he is not fully aware that his mental faculties are failing. Weber struggles to complete his epistemological magnum opus: A Theory of Human Knowledge. An excerpt from the manuscript reads:

Of laws logically contingent, the most universal are of such a kind that they must be true provided every form by which logical necessity must be thought of a given subject is also a form of its real being. If this be "metaphysical" necessity we may divide laws logically contingent into laws metaphysically necessary and laws metaphysically contingent.

Living in isolation on his now largely derelict three-acre ranch, his adult daughter Maude serves as his nurse and secretary. His sons are grown and live elsewhere.

Weber's internal monologue is a painful record of his academic career and the failure of his colleagues to acknowledge his superior intellect. Though a genuine prodigy in his childhood and young adulthood, his doctrinaire philosophical views and eccentricities as a professor earned him a reputation as a crank among staff and students. His silent litany of complaints against his fellow professors—most of them presumably long deceased—persist unabated in disturbing dreams.

A malnourished little boy from an impoverished local family wanders onto the property while Weber is writing outdoors in his journals. The child is mute and passive. To Weber's dismay, Maude brusquely orders the child off the property; she reports that the parents are degenerates. Weber had found the boy agreeable as a silent companion.

The child returns several times during the summer and is welcomed by the old man. It slowly dawns on Weber that the boy may be the victim of physical abuse. He writes a letter to the local authorities to report his suspicions and gives it to his daughter to post; there is no response. It is not clear that Maude sent her father's letter.

In late summer, the child ceases to appear. Weber believes he hears cries in the distance from the property where the boy lives. He rises at night and quietly leaves the house undetected by Maude. Physically fragile, the walk is an ordeal, but he finally arrives. He detects cries coming from an old shed. Upon opening the door, Weber discovers the naked and beaten boy bound by straps to a heavy farm implement. He unties the whimpering child, who rejoices at being rescued and laughs. "You see—? It's over. I've saved you" says Professor Weber: "They laughed quietly together, so that no one else could hear."

== Theme ==
Literary critic Greg Johnson reports that "A Theory of Knowledge" serves as a thematic bookend to the title story "Night-Side" in the collection: "By enclosing the collection within these Gothic borders, Oates again suggests the sensibility that will, in differing ways, infiltrate and control the entire volume." These tales also make the most explicit use of Gothic conventions. The title of the story denotes the working title of what the retired Professor Reuben Weber expects to be his epistemological masterwork: A Theory of Knowledge.

The irony of the tale resides in the dichotomy that represents "two theories of knowledge," namely "the grand but elusive philosophical design that Weber still hopes to construct" on one hand, as opposed to the narrative itself, "which dramatizes Oates's own, far less optimistic 'theory'."

Feminist critic Josephene T. M. Kealey, citing Gavin Cologne-Brookes, describes the theme as the struggle for dominance between abstract knowledge detached from life with an active engagement in human affairs.

Oates reported that "The Theory of Knowledge" was "a poetic attempt to dramatize the contradictions inherent in philosophizing—in abstracting from the world of sense experience and personal history."

The Weber character is based on the American philosopher Charles Sanders Peirce.

== Sources ==
- Johnson, Greg. 1994. Joyce Carol Oates: A Study of the Short Fiction. Twayne's studies in short fiction; no. 57. Twayne Publishers, New York. ISBN 0-8057-0857-X
- Kealey, Josephene T. M. 2015. "I know you!": The Implications of Knowing In Joyce Carol Oates's Marya: A Life," in Bearing Witness: Joyce Carol Oates Studies: Vol. 2, Article 5. https://repository.usfca.edu/cgi/viewcontent.cgi?article=1009&context=jcostudies Accessed 14 February 2025.
- Oates, Joyce Carol. 1977. Night-Side: Eighteen Tales. Vanguard Press, New York. ISBN 9780814907931
