= À rebours =

1884 book by Joris-Karl Huysmans

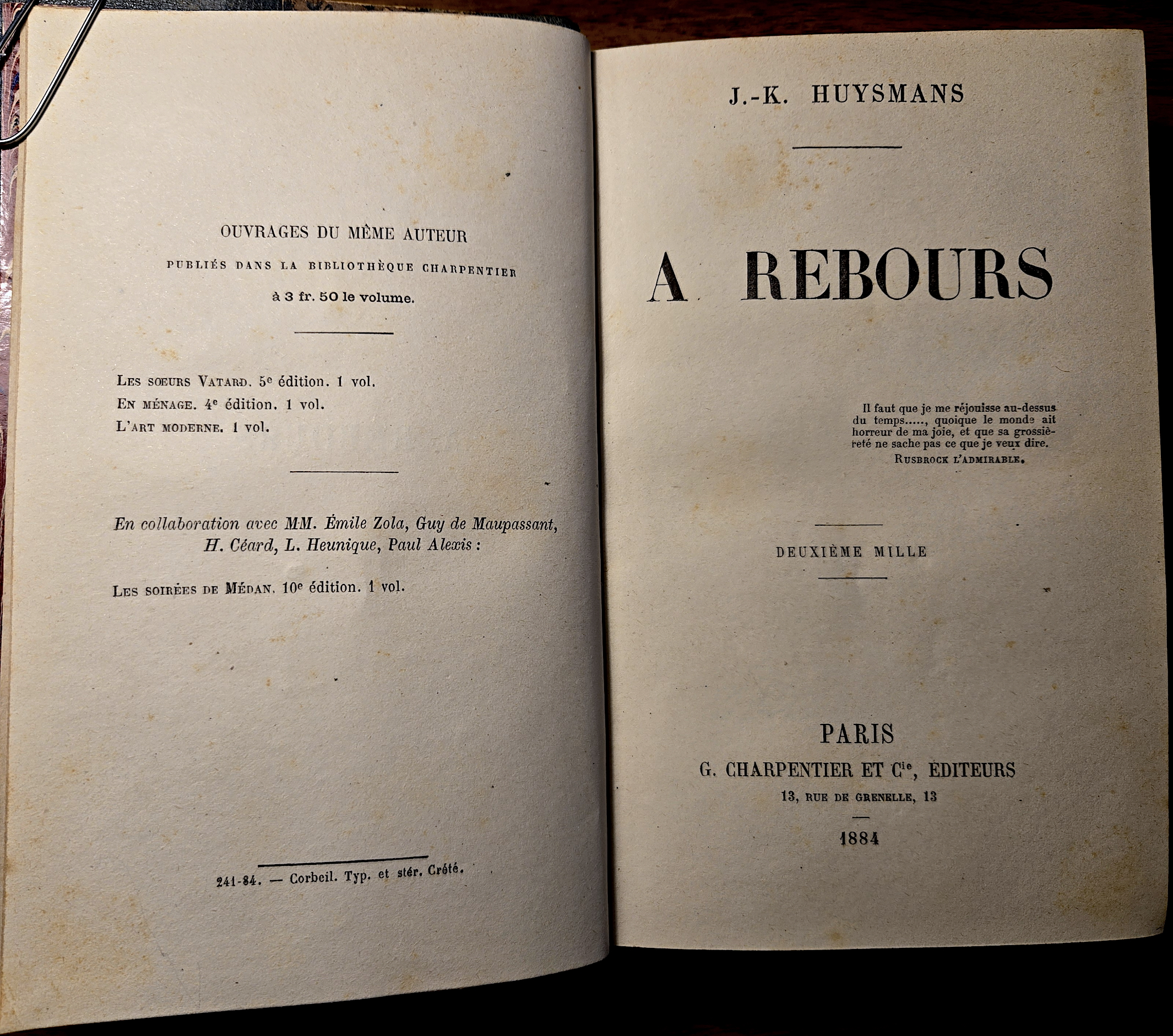
- Frontispiece of the first edition where "in collaboration" with the publisher Charpentier one can discern, among others, Émile Zola, Guy de Maupassant, Henry Cérard, Paul Alexis.
- Author: Joris-Karl Huysmans
- Original title: À rebours
- Language: French
- Genre: Decadent
- Publisher: Charpentier
- Publication date: May 1884
- Publication place: France

À rebours (French pronunciation: [a ʁəbuʁ]; translated Against Nature or Against the Grain) is an 1884 novel by the French writer Joris-Karl Huysmans. The narrative centers on a single character: Duke Jean des Esseintes, an eccentric, reclusive, ailing aesthete. The last scion of an aristocratic family, Des Esseintes loathes nineteenth-century bourgeois society and tries to retreat into an ideal artistic world of his own creation. The narrative is almost entirely a catalogue of the neurotic Des Esseintes's aesthetic tastes, musings on literature, painting, and religion, and hyperaesthetic sensory experiences.

À rebours contains many themes that became associated with the Symbolist aesthetic. In doing so, it broke from Naturalism and became the ultimate example of "Decadent" literature, inspiring works such as Oscar Wilde's The Picture of Dorian Gray (1890). In his preface for the 1903 publication of the novel, Huysmans wrote that he had the idea to portray a man "soaring upwards into dream, seeking refuge in illusions of extravagant fantasy, living alone, far from his century, among memories of more congenial times, of less base surroundings ... each chapter became the sublimate of a specialism, the refinement of a different art; it became condensed into an essence of jewellery, perfumes, religious and secular literature, of profane music and plain-chant."

== Background ==
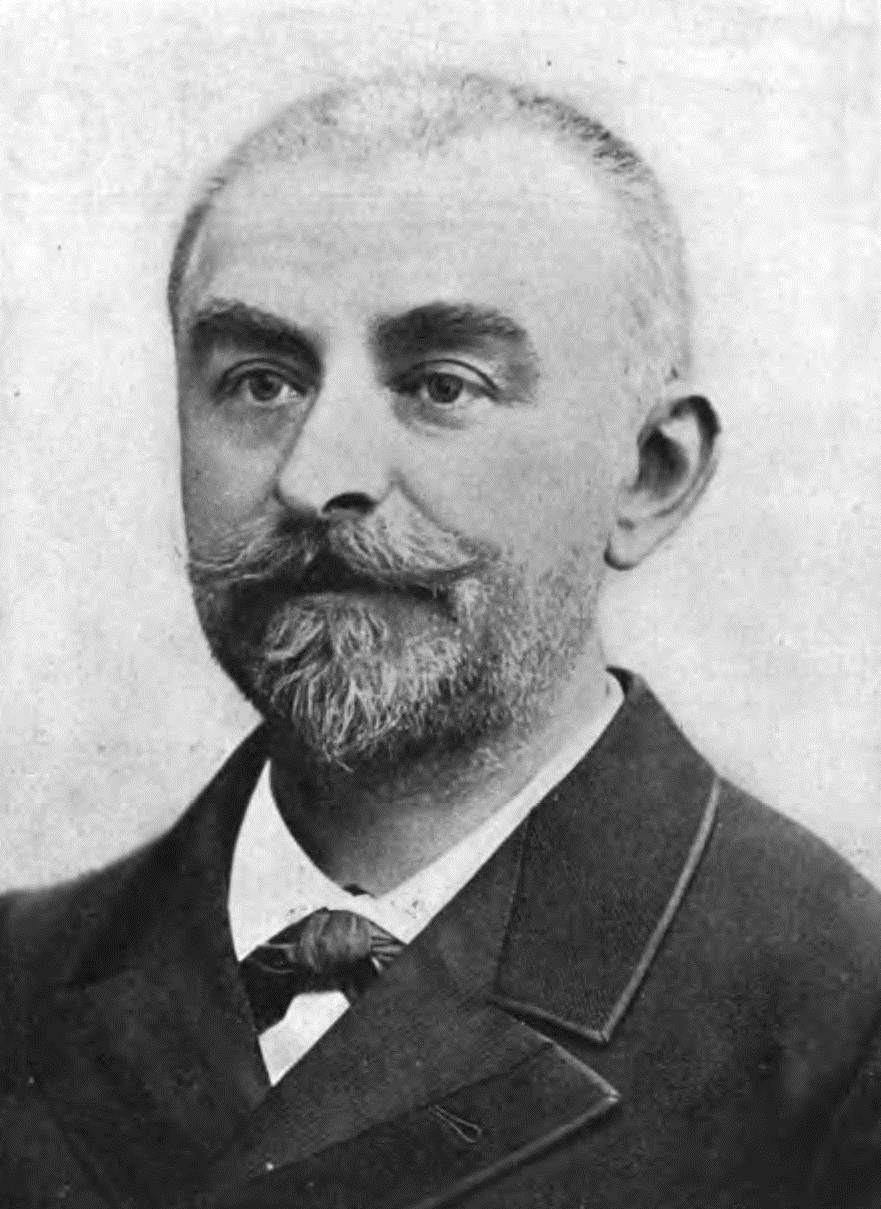
J.-K. Huysmans (1848–1907)

À rebours marked a watershed in Huysmans' career. His early works had been Naturalist in style, being realistic depictions of the drudgery and squalor of working- and lower-middle-class life in Paris. However, by the early 1880s, Huysmans regarded this approach to fiction as a dead end. As he wrote in his preface to the 1903 reissue of À rebours:

It was the heyday of Naturalism, but this school, which should have rendered the inestimable service of giving us real characters in precisely described settings, had ended up harping on the same old themes and was treading water. It scarcely admitted—in theory at least—any exceptions to the rule; thus it limited itself to depicting common existence, and struggled, under the pretext of being true to life, to create characters who would be as close as possible to the average run of mankind.

Huysmans decided to keep certain features of the Naturalist style, such as its use of minutely documented realistic detail, but apply them instead to a portrait of an exceptional individual: the protagonist Jean des Esseintes. In a letter of November 1882, Huysmans told Émile Zola, the leader of the Naturalist school of fiction, that he was changing his style of writing and had embarked on a "wild and gloomy fantasy". This "fantasy", originally entitled Seul (Alone), was to become À rebours.

The character of Des Esseintes is partly based on Huysmans himself, and the two share many of the same tastes, although Huysmans, on his modest civil-service salary, was hardly able to indulge them to the same extent as his upper-class hero. Huysmans biographer Robert Baldick names other models for Des Esseintes: Ludwig II of Bavaria, Edmond de Goncourt, Jules Barbey d'Aurevilly, Francis Poictevin, and Robert de Montesquiou.

The most important model, apart from Huysmans himself, was the notorious aristocratic aesthete Montesquiou, who was also the basis for Baron de Charlus in Marcel Proust's À la recherche du temps perdu. Montesquiou's furnishings bear a strong resemblance to those in Des Esseintes's house:

In 1883, to his eternal regret, Montesquiou admitted Stéphane Mallarmé [to his home]. It was late at night when the poet was shown over the house, and the only illumination came from a few scattered candelabra; yet in the flickering light Mallarmé observed that the door-bell was in fact a sacring-bell, that one room was furnished as a monastery cell and another as the cabin of a yacht, and that the third contained a Louis Quinze pulpit, three or four cathedral stalls and a strip of altar railing. He was shown, too, a sled picturesquely placed on a snow-white bearskin, a library of rare books in suitably-coloured bindings and the remains of an unfortunate tortoise whose shell had been coated with gold paint. According to Montesquiou, writing his memoirs many years later, the sight of these marvels left Mallarmé speechless with amazement. 'He went away', records Montesquiou, 'in a state of silent exaltation.... I do not doubt, therefore, that it was in the most admiring, sympathetic, and sincere good faith that he retailed to Huysmans what he had seen during the few moments he spent in Ali Baba's Cave.'

== Plot summary ==
Des Esseintes in his study, by Arthur Zaidenberg (Against the Grain, New York, Illustrated Editions, 1931)

The epigraph is a quotation from Jan van Ruysbroeck ('Ruysbroeck the Admirable'), the fourteenth-century Flemish mystic:

I must rejoice beyond the bounds of time ... though the world may shudder at my joy, and in its coarseness know not what I mean.

Jean des Esseintes is the last member of a powerful and once proud noble family. He has lived an extremely decadent life in Paris, which has left him disgusted with human society. Without telling anyone, he retreats to a house in the countryside, near Fontenay, and decides to spend the rest of his life in intellectual and aesthetic contemplation. In this sense, À rebours recalls Gustave Flaubert's Bouvard et Pécuchet (posthumously published in 1881), in which two Parisian copy-clerks decide to retire to the countryside and end up failing at various scientific and scholarly endeavors.

Huysmans' novel is essentially plotless. The protagonist fills the house with his eclectic art collection, which notably consists of reprints of the paintings of Gustave Moreau (such as Salome Dancing before Herod and L'Apparition), drawings of Odilon Redon, and engravings of Jan Luyken. Throughout his intellectual experiments, Des Esseintes recalls various debauched events and love affairs of his past in Paris. He tries his hand at inventing perfumes and he creates a garden of poisonous tropical flowers. Illustrating his preference for artifice over nature (a characteristic Decadent theme), Des Esseintes chooses real flowers that apparently imitate artificial ones. In one of the book's most surrealistic episodes, he has gemstones set in the shell of a tortoise. "[U]nable to bear the dazzling splendour imposed on it," the tortoise died. In another episode, he decides to visit London after reading the novels of Charles Dickens. He dines at an English restaurant in Paris while waiting for his train and is delighted by the resemblance of the people to his notions derived from literature. He then cancels his trip and returns home, convinced that only disillusion would await him if he were to follow through with his plans.

Des Esseintes conducts a survey of French and Latin literature, rejecting the works approved by the mainstream critics of his day. He rejects the academically respectable Latin authors of the "Golden Age" such as Virgil and Cicero, preferring later "Silver Age" writers such as Petronius (Des Esseintes praises the decadent Satyricon) and Apuleius (Metamorphoses, commonly known as The Golden Ass) as well as works of early Christian literature, whose style was usually dismissed as the "barbarous" product of the Dark Ages. Among French authors, he shows nothing but contempt for the Romantics but adores the poetry of Baudelaire.

Des Esseintes cares little for classic French authors like Rabelais, Molière, Voltaire, Rousseau, and Diderot, preferring the works of Bourdaloue, Bossuet, Nicole, and Pascal. The nineteenth-century German philosopher Arthur Schopenhauer, he exclaims, "alone was in the right" with his philosophy of pessimism, and Des Esseintes connects Schopenhauer's pessimistic outlook with the resignation of the Imitation of Christ, a fifteenth-century Christian devotional work by Thomas à Kempis. Des Esseintes' library includes authors of the nascent Symbolist movement, including Paul Verlaine, Tristan Corbière and Stéphane Mallarmé, as well as the decadent fiction of the unorthodox Catholic writers Auguste Villiers de l'Isle-Adam and Barbey d'Aurevilly. Among Catholic literature, Des Esseintes expresses attraction for the work of Ernest Hello.

Eventually, his late nights and idiosyncratic diet take their toll on his health, requiring him to return to Paris or to forfeit his life. In the last lines of the book, he compares his return to human society to that of a non-believer trying to embrace religion.

== Reception and influence ==
Title page of the 1926 first complete English translation with the caption "the book that Dorian Gray loved and that inspired Oscar Wilde".

Huysmans predicted his novel would be a failure with the public and critics: "It will be the biggest fiasco of the year—but I don't care a damn! It will be something nobody has ever done before, and I shall have said what I want to say ..." However, when it appeared in May 1884, the book created a storm of publicity. Though many critics were scandalised, it appealed to a young generation of aesthetes and writers.

Richard Ellmann describes the effect of the book in his biography of Oscar Wilde:

Whistler rushed to congratulate Huysmans the next day on his 'marvellous' book. Bourget, at that time a close friend of Huysmans as of Wilde, admired it greatly; Paul Valéry called it his 'Bible and his bedside book' and this is what it became for Wilde. He said to the Morning News: 'This last book of Huysmans is one of the best I have ever seen'. It was being reviewed everywhere as the guidebook of decadence. At the very moment that Wilde was falling in with social patterns, he was confronted with a book which even in its title defied them.

It is widely believed that À rebours is the "poisonous French novel" that leads to the downfall of Dorian Gray in Oscar Wilde's The Picture of Dorian Gray. The book's plot is said to have dominated the action of Dorian, causing him to live an amoral life of sin and hedonism. In Chapter 10, Dorian examines a book sent to him by the hedonistic aristocrat Lord Henry Wotton:

It was the strangest book that he had ever read. It seemed to him that in exquisite raiment, and to the delicate sound of flutes, the sins of the world were passing in dumb show before him.... It was a novel without a plot, and with only one character, being indeed, simply a psychological study of a certain young Parisian, who spent his life trying to realize in the nineteenth century all the passions and modes of thought that belonged to every century except his own.... The style in which it was written was that curious jewelled style, vivid and obscure at once, full of argot and of archaisms, of technical expressions and of elaborate paraphrases, that characterizes the work of some of the finest artists of the French school of Symbolistes. There were in it metaphors as monstrous as orchids, and as subtle in colour. The life of the senses was described in the terms of mystical philosophy. One hardly knew at times whether one was reading the spiritual ecstasies of some mediaeval saint or the morbid confessions of a modern sinner. It was a poisonous book. The heavy odour of incense seemed to cling about its pages and to trouble the brain. The mere cadence of the sentences, the subtle monotony of their music, so full as it was of complex refrains and movements elaborately repeated, produced in the mind of the lad, as he passed from chapter to chapter, a form of reverie, a malady of dreaming, that made him unconscious of the falling day and creeping shadows.

On the question of Huysmans' novel as an inspiration for The Picture of Dorian Gray, Ellmann writes:

Wilde does not name the book but at his trial he conceded that it was, or almost, Huysmans's À rebours.... To a correspondent he wrote that he had played a 'fantastic variation' upon À rebours and some day must write it down. The references in Dorian Gray to specific chapters are deliberately inaccurate.

Many works, according to Robert Baldick, "were manifestly inspired by Huysmans' novel — among them Remy de Gourmont's Sixtine, George Moore's A Mere Accident and Mike Fletcher, Oscar Wilde's The Picture of Dorian Gray, Salome, and The Sphinx".

À rebours is now considered by some an important step in the formation of gay literature. À rebours gained notoriety as an exhibit in the trials of Oscar Wilde in 1895. The prosecutor referred to it as a "sodomitical" book.

Zola, Huysmans' former mentor, gave the book a lukewarm reception. Huysmans initially tried to placate him by claiming the book was still in the Naturalist style and that Des Esseintes's opinions and tastes were not his own. However, when they met in July, Zola told Huysmans that the book had been a "terrible blow to Naturalism" and accused him of "leading the school astray" and "burning [his] boats with such a novel", claiming that "no type of literature was possible in this genre, exhausted by a single volume".

While he slowly drifted away from the Naturalists, Huysmans won new friends among the Symbolist and Catholic writers whose work he had praised in his novel. Stéphane Mallarmé responded with the tribute "Prose pour Des Esseintes", published in La Revue indépendante on January 1, 1885. This famous poem has been described as "perhaps the most enigmatic of Mallarmé's works". The opening stanza gives some of its flavour:

Hyperbole! de ma mémoire
Triomphalement ne sais-tu
Te lever, aujourd'hui grimoire
Dans un livre de fer vêtu...

Hyperbole! Can't you arise
From memory, and triumph, grow
Today a form of conjuration
Robed in an iron folio?
(Translated by Donald Davie)

The Catholic writer Léon Bloy praised the novel, describing Huysmans as "formerly a Naturalist, but now an Idealist capable of the most exalted mysticism, and as far removed from the crapulous Zola as if all the interplanetary spaces had suddenly accumulated between them." In his review, Barbey d'Aurevilly compared Huysmans to Baudelaire, recalling, "After Les Fleurs du mal, I told Baudelaire, 'it only remains for you to choose between the muzzle of the pistol and the foot of the Cross.' Baudelaire chose the foot of the Cross. But will the author of À Rebours make the same choice?" His prediction eventually proved true when Huysmans converted to Catholicism in the 1890s.

== Early English translations ==
"[T]he first English translation (by 'John Howard', i.e. Jacob Howard Lewis), considerably censored, of À Rebours was published by the small American firm Lieber & Lewis in 1922 under the title Against the Grain.... Another edition of Against the Grain was published in Paris in 1926 by Groves & Michaux in a translation which, though different, seems to bear some resemblance to that by John Howard."

== Sources ==
- Baldick, Robert. (1955; rev. Brendan King, 2006). The Life of J.-K. Huysmans. Dedalus Books. ISBN 9781903517437
- Ellmann, Richard. (1988). Oscar Wilde. Vintage. ISBN 9780394759845
- Huysmans, Joris-Karl. (1969). Against the Grain (A Rebours), trans. unnamed, introduction by Havelock Ellis. New York: Dover Publications, Inc. (republication of the English translation published by Three Sirens Press, New York, in 1931).
- Huysmans, Joris-Karl. (2003) [1959]. Against Nature, trans. Robert Baldick, introduction by Patrick McGuinness. Penguin. ISBN 9780140447637.
- Huysmans, Joris-Karl. (2008). Against Nature, trans. Brendan King. Dedalus Books. ISBN 9781903517659. Includes translated selections from original manuscript.
- Huysmans, Joris-Karl. (2009). Against Nature, trans. Margaret Mauldon, introduction by Nicholas White. Oxford World's Classics. ISBN 9780199555116.
- Huysmans, Joris-Karl. (2018) [1922]. Against Nature, trans. John Howard, introduction by Havelock Ellis. Simon & Brown. ISBN 9781731705853.
- Huysmans, Joris-Karl. (2019). Against Nature, trans. Theo Cuffe, foreword by Lucy Sante. U.K.: Riverrun. New York: Picador (2022). ISBN 9781250787668.
- Huysmans: Romans (Volume 1), ed. Pierre Brunel et al. (Bouquins, Robert Laffont, 2005).
- Wilde, Oscar. (1998). The Picture of Dorian Gray, ed. Isobel Murray. Oxford World's Classics. ISBN 0192833650.
