= Raymond Abbott =

American novelist (born 1942)

- Born: Raymond Herbert Abbott; April 21, 1942 (age 84); Newburyport, Massachusetts, United States
- Education: Bachelor of Arts - University of Massachusetts
- Occupation: Author
- Spouse: Marye Dillon 1977-2004 (Divorced)
- Children: Carolyn Dillon Abbott Schwent
- Writing career
- Language: English
- Period: 1979–
- Genre: Fiction
- Notable awards: Whiting Award; 1985 Fiction; National Endowment for the Arts (1979)

Raymond Abbott (born April 21, 1942) is an American novelist.

== Biography ==
Raymond Herbert Abbott was born in Newburyport, April 21, 1942. He was the son of Myron E., a ship worker, and Evelyn Foley. He was educated at the University of Massachusetts in 1965 with a B.A. and University of Kentucky graduate studies, 1967–68. He is a member of the Authors Guild. He currently resides in Louisville, KY.

Abbott volunteered at Rosebud Indian Reservation in 1965–66, then community development director in Transitional Housing Program for Sioux tribe at Rosebud, 1966–67. After that, he became an elementary schoolteacher in Lost Creek, KY, 1967–68, followed by being a social worker for the city of Louisville, KY, 1967–68. He then became a social worker in Massachusetts: Pittsfield (1969–70), South End, 1970–73, and finally Newburyport, (1973–).

== Awards ==
- 1979 NEA Grant
- 1985 Whiting Award

== Works ==
- John Marvin; Raymond Abbott (1979). Death dances: two novellas on North American Indians. Apple-wood Press. ISBN 978-0-918222-07-7.
- That day in Gordon: a novel. Vanguard Press. 1986. ISBN 978-0-8149-0924-9.
- Black Hills Summer. Strathmoor Press. 2003. ISBN 978-0-9740718-0-0.
- My Life Among the Indians. Strathmoor Press. 2005. ISBN 978-0-9740718-1-7.
- Indian Stories. Strathmoor Press. 2006. ISBN 978-0-9740718-2-4.
- Crazy Horse's Bones. Strathmoor Press. 2014. ISBN 978-0-9740718-3-1.

He also is contributes to North American Review, KevinMD, Blue Cloud Quarterly, and Phoenix.

=== Criticism ===
- Abbott, Raymond (June 12, 1988). "SAVAGES AND SIOUX". The New York Times.

== Quotes ==
"Much of my inspiration ... for my first three novels came from living for several years on a Sioux reservation in South Dakota.... My interest is to become a good story teller."
