= Aage Krarup Nielsen =

Travel writer

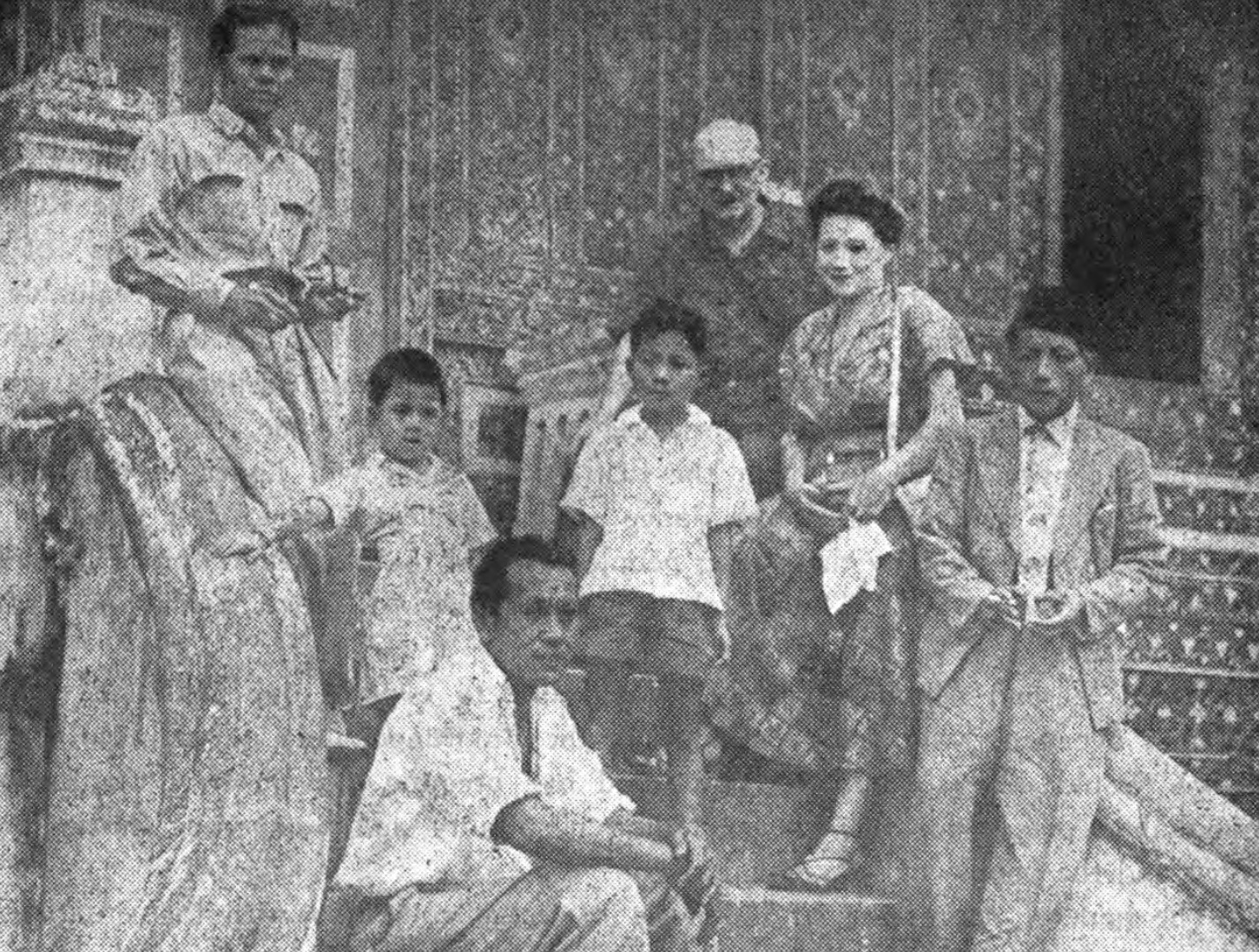
Nielsen and his wife (top center) at a rumah gadang in Padang Panjang, Indonesia, 1953

Aage Krarup Nielsen (30 July 1891 – 29 January 1972) was a travel writer.

In the days before the Second World War, Nielsen traveled the world. His travel accounts, primarily published by Gyldendalske Boghandel, Copenhagen, in Denmark, were quite popular and issued in a variety of editions and bindings.

== Books ==
- 1921 - En hvalfangerfærd (Antarctic Exploration, Falkland Islands, etc.)
- 1923 - En østerlandfærd
- 1924 - Fra Mandalay til Moskva (From Mandalay to Moscow)
- 1925 - Mads Lange til Bali
- 1927 - Dragen vaagner
- 1928 - Mellem kannibaler og paradisfugle (Between Cannibals and Birds of Paradise)
- 1929 - I doktorbaad og Karriol (Lapland)
- 1931 - Perler og palmer
- 1932 - Fra Moskva til Persepolis (From Moscow to Persepolis [Persepolis is an ancient city in Iran (Persia)])
- 1933 - Helvedet hinsides havet (Hell Across the Sea, French Guiana)
- 1934 - Blandt hovedjægere i Ecuador
- 1935 - Marco Polos rejser (Marco Polo's Travels)
- 1936 - Hell Beyond the Seas (Vanguard Press)
- 1937 - Sol over Mexico (Sun Over Mexico)
- 1939 - Aloha (Hawaii, Fiji, Tahiti, etc.)
- 1940 - Hans Falk fra Maketu
- 1942 - Landet med lykkelige smil (Land of the Fortunate Smile)
- 1944 - Paa krydstogt mod Ny Guinea
- 1946 - Fra en helt anden verden
- 1947 - Gensyn med Østen (Return to the East)
- 1949 - Kimono og khaki (Kimono and Khaki - Occupied Japan)
- 1951 - Fra Korea til Bali (From Korea to Bali)
- 1954 - Merdeka
- 1956 - Sorte sorgløse Haïti
- 1958 - De gyldne pagoders land (Land of Golden Pagodas - Burma)
