= Evelyn Shrifte =

American publisher

Evelyn Shrifte was the president and publisher of Vanguard Press from 1952 until it was sold to Random House in 1988. She was known for publishing works of authors who were not well-recognized at the time she discovered them.

== Education and career ==
Shrifte earned her bachelor's degree from Barnard College in 1921. She then worked for The Musical Quarterly, a journal on music, and worked in a New York City bookstore. In 1929 she joined Vanguard publishing; she became president, and publisher, of the company in 1952. She remained president of the company until it was sold in 1988 to Random House.Shrifte was known for her work finding new authors, most notably her discovery of Saul Bellow, Dr. Seuss, and Joyce Carol Oates. Her work with Oates extended over multiple years and Shrifte recognized 'genius' in Oates, and hosted parties to celebrate the release of books written by Oates. Ultimately Oates left Vanguard for a different publisher despite her close relationship with Shrifte.

Shrifte died on August 8, 1999.
