= Seon Manley =

Editor and author

- Born: Janet Helen Givens; January 7, 1921; Connecticut
- Died: March 11, 2009 (aged 88)
- Education: Wellesley College

Seon Manley (January 7, 1921 – March 11, 2009), was an American editor and author who worked with her sister Gogo Lewis. She worked with the supernatural, tales of suspense, and horror as well as biographies.

== Biography ==
Janet Helen Givens was born in Connecticut on January 7, 1921 to Webster Crane Givens and Carolyn McLean. Her degree was from Wellesley College. Her mother died while she was young and she and her sister were sent to live with their grandparents in New York for a time. She became the advertising manager for the publishing house Vanguard Press. Manley began editing books for Vanguard, including critical works like those by Eugene Jolas. Manley also edited anthologies of horror stories, mostly with her sister Gogo Lewis. Edward Gorey created the covers for eight of these from 1973 to 1979. Manley also wrote about the places and people she encountered and various times in her life in a series of mostly autobiographical books. With her husband she edited a book on The Age of the Manager which went with his consulting company. They also created books on the history of a selection of beaches and islands and the people involved in them. Manley in 2009. Her husband was Robert Russell Manley Jr, with whom she had a daughter Shivaun.

== Bibliography ==
=== Books ===
- Long Island Discovery: An Adventure Into the History, Manners, and Mores of America's Front Porch, 1966
- Dorothy and William Wordsworth : the heart of a circle of friends, 1974
- Rudyard Kipling: Creative Adventurer, 1965
- Nathaniel Hawthorne; captain of the imagination, 1968
- My Heart's in the Heather, 1968
- Beaches: their lives, legends, and lore, 1968
- Islands: their lives, legends, and lore, 1970

=== Anthologies ===
- The Ghost in the Far Garden, and Other Stories, 1977
- Magic!: A Treasury for Young Readers, 1967
- Shapes of the Supernatural, 1969
- A Gathering of Ghosts, 1970
- Ladies of Horror: Two Centuries of Supernatural Stories by the Gentle Sex, 1971
- Mistresses of Mystery: Two Centuries of Suspense Stories by the Gentle Sex, 1973
- Baleful Beasts, 1974
- Bewitched Beings, 1974
- Ladies of Fantasy: Two Centuries of Sinister Stories by the Gentle Sex, 1975
- Ladies of the Gothics, 1975
- Masters of the Macabre, 1975
- Women of the Weird: Eerie Stories by the Gentle Sex, 1976
- Sisters of Sorcery, 1976
- Ghostly Gentlewomen: Two Centuries of Spectral Stories By the Gentle Sex, 1977
- Christmas Ghosts, 1978
- Masters of Shades and Shadows: An Anthology of Great Ghost Stories, 1978
- Nature's Revenge: Eerie Stories of Revolt Against the Human Race, 1978
- Fun Phantoms: Tales of Ghostly Entertainment, 1979
- The Haunted Dolls, 1980

=== Short fiction ===
- Yes, My Darling Daughter, 1976
- Letter from Massachusetts: 1688, 1976
- The Most Beautiful Birds in the World, 1978
- The Christmas of the Big Bisque Doll, 1980
