= Grant Lewi =

American astrologer

William Grant Lewi II
- Born: June 8, 1902; Albany, New York
- Died: July 15, 1951 (aged 49); Tucson, Arizona
- Occupations: Astrologer; Author

William Grant Lewi II (June 8, 1902 – July 14 or 15, 1951) was an American astrologer and author.

Best known for his books Astrology for the Millions and Heaven Knows What, Lewi has been described as the father of modern astrology in America.

== Life ==
Lewi was born in Albany, New York. He attended Hamilton College and graduated from Columbia University. He taught English at Dartmouth College, the University of North Dakota, and at the University of Delaware.

Lewi married Carolyn Wallace in 1926. He began his study of astrology with his mother-in-law, Athene Gale Wallace.

In 1934, Lewi began working as a professional astrologer.

In 1935, Lewi's book Heaven Knows What was published under the pseudonym Scorpio. Lewi pioneered a form of looking up interpretations of the 144 Sun/Moon sign delineations combined with aspect cross-references, which he developed on the basis of thousands of questionnaire responses.

In 1940, Astrology for the Millions was published. In it he provided a short outline of his life.

Lewi edited Horoscope Magazine in the late 1930s and 1940s.

Lewi began his own magazine, The Astrologer, in 1950.

Lewi moved to Arizona in the early 1950s, and died July 15, 1951. He has been described as "the father of modern astrology in America".

== Works ==
- 1935: Star of Empire: A Novel (New York: Vanguard Press).
- 1935: Heaven Knows What, under the pseudonym Scorpio (Garden City, New York: Doubleday, Doran & company, inc.).
- 1937: The Gods Arrive: A Novel of American Life and American Business, 1928-1935 (Philadelphia, London: J. B. Lippincott Company).
- 1940: Astrology for the Millions (New York: Doubleday, Doran and company).
- 1946: Your Greatest Strength (Philadelphia: David McKay company).
