= Robert Hupka =

Robert Hupka (August 26, 1919 – July 3, 2001) was a recording engineer for RCA Victor and later for Columbia Records and, until his retirement, a cameraman for CBS Television in New York. He was born in Vienna, and emigrated to the U.S. at the onset of World War II to escape the Nazi persecution which took his parents' lives. His grandfather was the composer Ignaz Brüll, who was a friend of Brahms.

Hupka took thousands of famous candid photographs of conductor Arturo Toscanini while Toscanini was leading the NBC Symphony Orchestra in rehearsals. Many of these photos were published in the book This Was Toscanini, (1963) accompanying an uncompleted essay by Samuel Antek, a violinist in the NBC Symphony. Later, those and several more photos were used as cover art for RCA LP and CD reissues of Toscanini's recordings. Three of these photos were used as set pieces in the television show, The Odd Couple; the photos can be seen on the wall in Felix Unger's bedroom. In the late 1980s, Hupka worked with engineers at NBC International on the audio/video synchronization of the ten Toscanini telecasts, which were finally issued by RCA in the early 1990s.

Hupka was also the author of Michelangelo: Pieta, a collection of a hundred photographs, from various angles and with different lighting, of Michelangelo's Pieta, taken in 1964 when this sculpture was exhibited at the New York World's Fair.
