= Samuel Antek =

American violinist

Samuel Antek (May 1, 1909 – January 27, 1958) was a violinist in the NBC Symphony Orchestra under conductor Arturo Toscanini. He joined at the orchestra's inception in 1937 and played with it until its dissolution in 1954.

Antek was also a conductor and served as music director for the New Jersey Symphony Orchestra from 1947 to 1958. In 1948, he conducted the Naumburg Orchestral Concerts, in the Naumburg Bandshell, Central Park, in the summer series. After leaving the NBC Symphony, he served as assistant conductor with the Chicago Symphony under Fritz Reiner. Antek's untimely death led Reiner to appoint Walter Hendl, then music director of the Dallas Symphony, to this position.

Antek wrote a series of essays about Toscanini, describing the famed Italian conductor from the point of view of an orchestral musician. They were collected in a book entitled This Was Toscanini, accompanied by renowned photographs of Toscanini by Robert Hupka; it was published posthumously by the Vanguard Press in 1963. An earlier piece about Toscanini by Antek, "Playing with the Maestro", appeared in Saturday Review magazine in the early 1950s.

Antek died of a heart attack in 1958 at the age of 48, one year after Toscanini's own death.
