= Company clerk =

A company clerk is a person who keeps files, carries out secretarial work, among other duties, at an office, or within a military company, camp, or base.

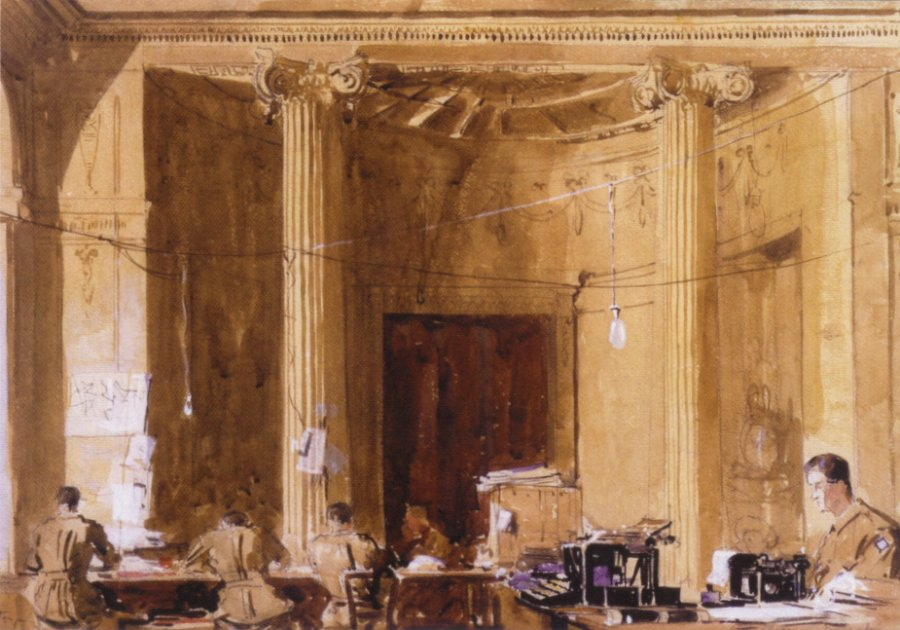
Painting of Australian Army clerks at work at their headquarters in Saint-Gratien, Val-d'Oise, north of Paris, France, during the First World War, painted by Arthur Streeton, 1918
