= Francis Poictevin =

French writer and dandy

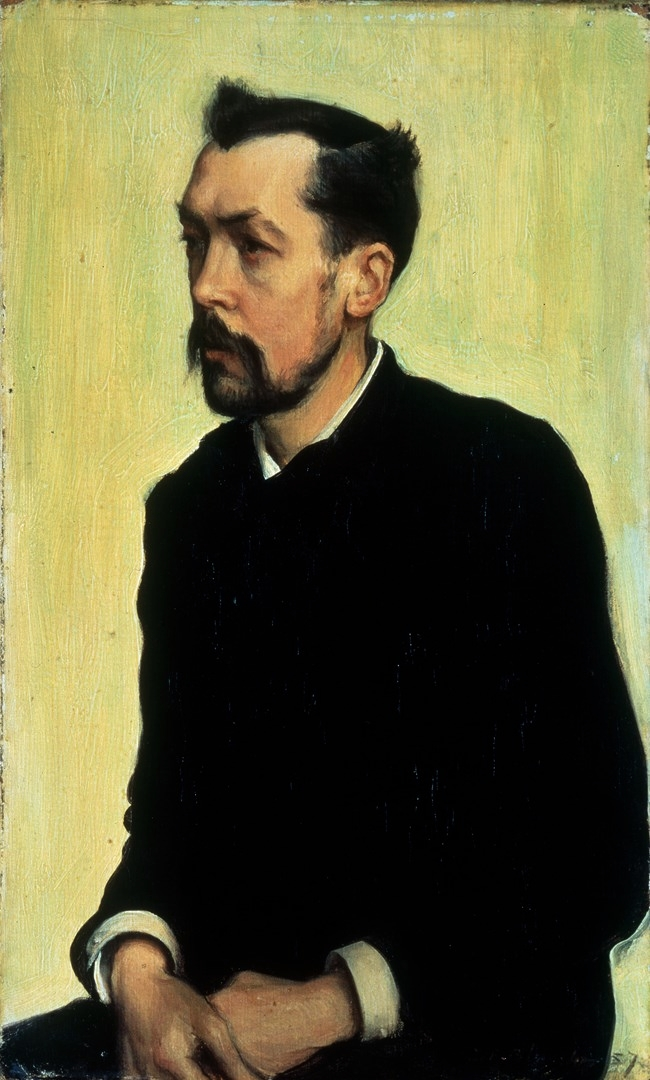
Portrait by Jacques-Émile Blanche, 1887. National Gallery (London).

Francis Paul Édouard Adrien Poictevin (27 June 1854 – 6 May 1904) was a French writer, dandy and novelist. Born to the banker Paul Poictevin in Paris, his novels amplified the processes of "artistic writing". He was a disciple of Edmond de Goncourt, friend and confident of Joris-Karl Huysmans, but turned more and more towards mysticism and madness. Forgotten, he was later strongly admired by Louis Aragon, Paul Éluard and André Breton.

== Life ==
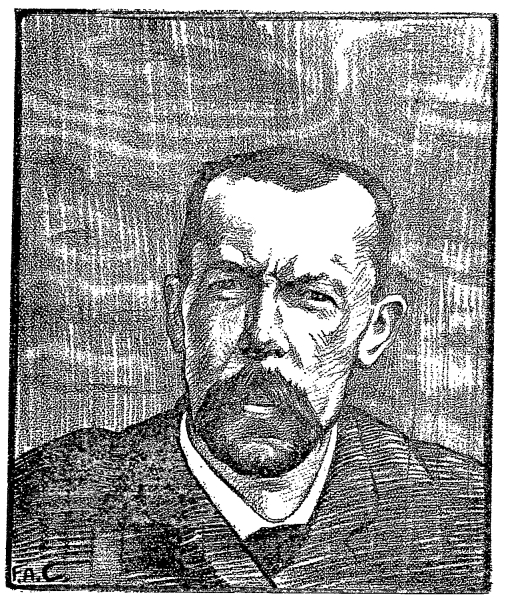
Portrait by Frédéric-Auguste Cazals.

Growing up in an affluent environment, after his secondary education at the lycée Louis-le-Grand and studies of law, he travelled in Germany, England and Italy and studied literature but did not take up a job. In 1882 he met Jules Barbey d'Aurevilly, the start of a friendship and a five-year correspondence. Rich and eccentric, he was one of the models for his friend Joris-Karl Huysmans's character Des Esseintes in À rebours.

Dedicated to Edmond de Goncourt, whose salon he regularly attended, his second novel Ludine was published in 1883. Guy de Maupassant devoted a favourable article to it in Le Gaulois (28 October), but he was critiqued by Léon Bloy in le Chat Noir (27 October). In 1888, he collaborated on La Revue indépendante, co-founded by Félix Fénéon.

From 1895, Francis Poictevin travelled more and more often to the Côte d'Azur for his health and stopped writing. In 1896 he married Alice Devaux, who had been his mistress since 1881. He sank slowly into silence from 1897 onwards - his fascination for Christian mysticism advocating "annihilation into God" led him into near-silence. Only Georges Rodenbach and then Huysmans still looked after him in his final years. He died at Menton, with his death certificate stating "rentier" as his profession.

== Works ==
- 1882 : La Robe du moine, letter preface by Alphonse Daudet, Paris, Sandoz.
- 1883 : Ludine, Bruxelles, Henry Kistemaeckers.
- 1884 : Songes, Bruxelles, H. Kistemaeckers.
- 1885 : Petitau, Bruxelles, H. Kistemaeckers.
- 1886 : Seuls, Paris, Tresse & Stock.
- 1888 : Paysages et nouveaux songes, Paris, Librairie de la Revue indépendante.
- 1888 : Derniers songes, Paris, Alphonse Lemerre.
- 1889 : Double, Paris, A. Lemerre.
- 1890 : Presque, Paris, A. Lemerre.
- 1892 : Heures, Paris, A. Lemerre.
- 1893 : Tout bas, Paris, A. Lemerre.
- 1894 : Ombres, Paris, A. Lemerre.

== Bibliography ==
- Poictevin granted journalist G. Davenay an interview, published in Figaro on 25 September 1893; texte on Gallica
- Verlaine dedicated one of his 27 monographs to Poictevin : Francis Poictevin, published in the review Les Hommes d'aujourd'hui, no. 424, 1894; text on wikisource.
- Francis Poictevin, Derniers songes, suivi de Double, préface de Bertrand Delcour, Morsang-sur-Orge, Safrat ("Romans oubliés"), 1991.
- Francis Poictevin, Ludine [1883], édition et présentation de Jean de Palacio, Séguier ("Bibliothèque décadente"), 1996. Avec en annexe une chronologie, et des textes critiques de Maupassant, Bloy, Gustave Kahn, Verlaine, Gourmont, etc.
- Francis Poictevin, À Arcachon (Songe, Ombres...), textes choisis et présentés par François Talmont, Bordeaux, Pierre Mainard ("Rrose", 3), 2002.
