= James Peter Warbasse =

American surgeon (1866–1957)

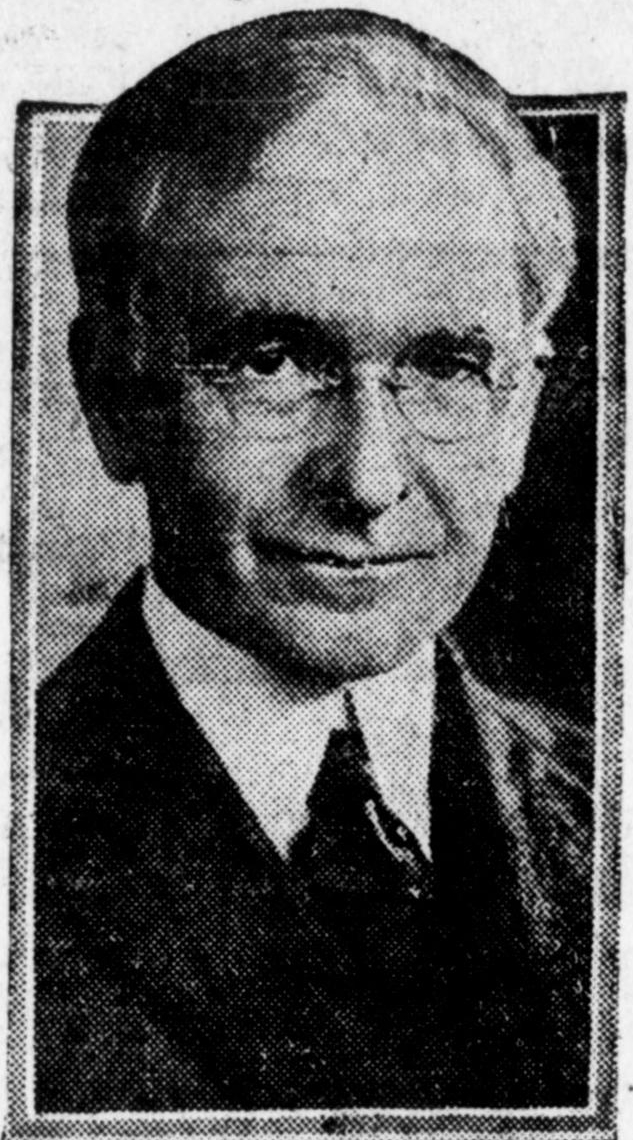
- Warbasse c. 1924
- Born: November 22, 1866; Newton, New Jersey, US
- Died: February 22, 1957 (aged 90); Woods Hole, Massachusetts, US
- Occupations: Surgeon; cooperator
- Spouse: Agnes Dyer Warbasse (m. 1903)

James Peter Warbasse (November 22, 1866 – February 22, 1957) was an American surgeon and advocate for cooperatives. He founded the Cooperative League of the United States of America (which later became the National Cooperative Business Association) and was its president from 1916 to 1941.

== Early life ==
Warbasse was born on November 22, 1866, in Newton, New Jersey to Joseph Warbasse and Harlett Northrup.

== Early career ==
Warbasse graduated from the Columbia University College of Physicians and Surgeons in 1889. From 1889 to 1891 he interned at the Methodist Episcopal Hospital in Brooklyn, New York. Warbasse did postgraduate work under surgeon Franz König and pathologist Johannes Orth in Göttingen, Germany and in Vienna, Austria under Theodor Billroth. He established a private practice in 1892.

In 1898, Warbasse served as acting assistant surgeon in the Seventh Army Corps of the U.S. Army during the Spanish–American War in Cuba and Florida. The following year, he was captain and assistant surgeon of the 13th regiment of the New York Artillery. Warbasse married Agnes Louise Dyer, daughter of Henry Knight Dyer on April 15, 1903. Warbasse became chief surgeon of the German Hospital of Brooklyn in 1906. He was the editor of the New York State Journal of Medicine from 1905 to 1909.

Though born into the privileged class of early New England heritage, Warbasse was a tireless advocate for social equality and economic democracy. In 1911, Warbasse was a member of the "Recruiting Local" No. 174 of the Industrial Workers of the World. In the 1910s, he published essays on The Socialization of Medicine and Conserving Health versus Exploiting Disease. He was a supporter of animal research and an opponent of limitations on the use of dogs. He was also involved with the Socialist Party. In 1913 he wrote a pamphlet entitled The Ethics of Sabotage and aided textile mill strikers in New Bedford, Massachusetts. Warbasse founded the Cooperative League of the U.S.A. in New York City in 1916 with his wife Agnes, baker and author Alfred Sonnichsen and other progressive organizers. Warbasse, genuinely seeking a solution to the world's inequalities, ultimately rejected socialism, anarchism and radical unionism in favor of cooperative economics as the best model for creating an inclusive economy in the context of preserving personal freedom and political autonomy.

== Cooperative life and career ==
An advocate against militarism, Warbasse was expelled from the Kings County, New York Medical Society in 1918 for writing a letter to the Long Island Medical Journal critical of compulsory military training. The Kings County Medical Society apologized to Dr. Warbasse in 1930, rescinded his expulsion and expunged from their records all evidence of their having expelled him.

As leader of the Cooperative League, Warbasse went on to become one of the most influential cooperative leaders of the 20th century. He was a sought public speaker at colleges, union halls and at gatherings of medical professionals. He represented the Cooperative League to the International Cooperative Alliance for many years while holding cooperative topical discussions for his friends and neighbors during the summers at his home in Woods Hole.

Warbasse's friends and associates included Big Bill Haywood of the Industrial Workers of the World, W. E. B. Du Bois and Eleanor Roosevelt. The home he shared with his wife Agnes and their six children, bustled with the comings and goings of neighborhood pals and distinguished guests.

Warbasse wrote many books throughout his career, including a three volume text on surgical practices and about 100 scientific and clinical papers. In the 1930s, he was invited by President Franklin D. Roosevelt to serve on the Consumer Board of the National Recovery Administration.

In 1955, Warbasse was named Humanist of the Year by the American Humanist Association, just the third person to receive the honor.

Warbasse officiated at his daughter Vera's wedding in 1937.

== Death and legacy ==
Warbasse died on February 22, 1957, in Woods Hole, Massachusetts. He was inducted into the Cooperative Hall of Fame in 1976. The Amalgamated Warbasse Houses in Brooklyn, New York are named for him.

== Bibliography ==
- Medical Sociology: A Series of Observations Touching upon the Sociology of Health and the Relations of Medicine to Society, D. Appleton & Company, 1909
- The Conquest of Disease through Animal Experimentation, D. Appleton & Company, 1910
- Surgical Treatment: A Practical Treatise on the Therapy of Surgical Diseases for the Use of Practitioners and Students of Surgery, W.B. Saunders Co., 1918
- What is Cooperation?, Vanguard, 1927
- Co-Operative Democracy through Voluntary Association of the People as Consumers, Macmillan, 1927
- The Doctor and the Public, Paul B. Hoeber, Inc, New York, 1935
- The Cooperative Way, a Method of World Reconstruction, Barnes & Noble, 1946
- Poems of the Family Circle, New York Profile Press, 1946
- Cooperative Peace, Cooperative Publishing Association, 1950
- Three Voyages: The Story of an Inquiring Soul (autobiography), 1956
- Cooperative Medicine
