= Joseph Gantner =

Swiss art historian

Joseph Gantner (Baden, Canton Aargau, Switzerland 11 September 1896—Basel 7 April 1988) was a Swiss art historian.

His father Alfred Gantner, a manager at Brown Boveri, and his wife Marie (née Wächter), a midwife. In 1932 Joseph Gantner married Maria Hanna Dreyfus.

Gantner's studies took him to the University of Zurich, the University of Basel, the University of Geneva, and finally to the Ludwig-Maximilians-Universität München, where he completed a doctorate in 1920 under Heinrich Wölfflin (1864–1945). He also spent a semester at the Sapienza University of Rome with Adolfo Venturi. His Habilitationsschrift was completed in 1926. From 1922 or 1923 to 1927, he was Editor of the periodical Das Werk and later also of Das neue Frankfurt. From 1927 until 1932, Gantner taught at the Kunstschule in Frankfurt-am-Main.

He returned to Switzerland in 1933 when the Nazi menace began to increase. From 1926 to 1928, and then again from 1933 to 1938, he worked on a second Ph.D. from the University of Zurich. In 1938 at the age of 42 he was appointed Professor of Art History at the University of Basel, and remained there until retirement in 1967. In 1954, he became Rector of the University and that same year became a member of the Basel Art Museum Commission. He founded the Basler Beiträge zur Kunstgeschichte in 1943, and edited the Zeitschrift für Ästhetik und allgemeine Kunstwissenschaft from 1952 together with Heinrich Lützeler.

His portrait was painted by Augusto Giacometti, a second cousin of Alberto Giacometti, and is now in the possession of his daughter Vera.
