= Queen's Quarterly =

- Discipline: Cultural and literary
- Language: English
- Edited by: James Carson

Publication details
- History: 1893–present
- Publisher: Queen's University (Canada)
- Frequency: Quarterly

Standard abbreviations
- ISO 4: Queen's Q.

Indexing
- ISSN: 0033-6041

Links
- Journal homepage

Queen's Quarterly is a Canadian quarterly peer-reviewed literary and academic journal of cultural studies. Established in 1893 at Queen's University in Kingston, Ontario, Queen's Quarterly is Canada's oldest academic quarterly. This magazine has won numerous awards including awards and nominations from National Media Awards Foundation.

Some of the key founders are George Munro Grant, Sanford Fleming, and John Watson. The journal publishes articles, essays, reviews, short stories and poetry. For decades, many well-known Canadian writers, such as Margaret Atwood and Irving Layton, have contributed to Queen's Quarterly.

The journal is abstracted and indexed in the Arts & Humanities Citation Index, Current Contents, MLA International Bibliography, and Abstracts of English Studies.

== Editors ==
The following persons have been editor-in-chief of the journal:

- Duncan McArthur
- Malcolm Ross
- Glen Shortliffe
- Kerry McSweeney
- Michael Allen Fox
- Boris Castel
- James Carson
