= Vanguard Press =

1926–1988 American publishing house

- Founded: March 1926; 100 years ago
- Founder: Roger Baldwin; Scott Nearing; Trustees of the Garland Fund
- Defunct: 1988; 38 years ago
- Successor: Random House
- Country of origin: United States
- Headquarters location: New York City
- Key people: Rex Stout (1926–1928); James Henle (1928–1952); Evelyn Shrifte (1952–1988)
- Publication types: Books

The Vanguard Press was a United States publishing house established with a $100,000 grant from the American Fund for Public Service, better known as the Garland Fund. Throughout the 1920s, Vanguard Press issued an array of books on radical topics, including studies of the Soviet Union, socialist theory, and politically oriented fiction by a range of writers. The press ultimately received a total of $155,000 from the Garland Fund, which separated itself and turned the press over to its publisher, James Henle. Henle became sole owner in February 1932.

Eschewing radical politics after 1929, the Vanguard Press operated as a respected independent literary house for 62 years. Its catalog of fiction, poetry, non-fiction and children's literature included the first books of Nelson Algren, Saul Bellow, Marshall McLuhan, Joyce Carol Oates and Dr. Seuss. With a valuable backlist of 500 titles, the company was sold to Random House in October 1988.

In his history of book publishing, Between Covers (1987), John Tebbel wrote: "Vanguard never became a large and important house, but it continued to publish quality books year after year."

== Institutional history ==
=== Establishment ===
The May 1926 meeting of the directors of the American Fund for Public Service, better known as the Garland Fund, allocated $100,000 to establish the Vanguard Press. The new publisher was intended to reissue left-wing classics at an affordable cost and to provide an outlet for the publication of new titles otherwise deemed "unpublishable" by the commercial press of the day. The initial officers and directors of the new publishing house included Jacob Baker, Roger Baldwin, Elizabeth Gurley Flynn, Clinton Golden, Louis Kopelin, Bertha Mailly, Scott Nearing and Rex Stout. Stout accepted the post of president and held it until 1928, when the Garland Fund ended its subsidy and James Henle became president.

The Vanguard Press emulated the Little Leather Library, the first company to mass-market inexpensive books in the United States, and the Little Blue Books of Emanuel Haldeman-Julius. Vanguard depicted itself in promotional advertising as "destined to be the Ford of Book Publishing" through its inexpensive offerings of "all the grand old idol breakers."

In June 1926, the new publisher made an offer to sundry "labor and liberal organizations", offering to finance half the cost of publishing any book of "permanent educational value", whether it be an original manuscript or a reprint of an existing title. Vanguard Press would print a run of 2,000 copies, with the issuing organization paying for only 1,000 at 25 cents a copy, leaving Vanguard to sell the other 1,000.

Vanguard raised its prices over time but still remained an economical source of hardcover books. By 1928 the standard price for Vanguard titles, such as the books of the series entitled "Studies of Soviet Russia" and "Current Questions", was 75 cents per copy. The series on "American Imperialism" edited by Harry Elmer Barnes and launched in 1928 bore a cover price of $1.00 per copy. In 1927 Vanguard published a collection of H. G. Wells's writings (Wells' Social Anticipations), edited by Harry W. Laidler. Vanguard also published the 1927 edition of the American Labor Year Book on behalf of the Socialist Party-affiliated Rand School of Social Science, which sold for $1.50.

The Garland Fund ultimately supported Vanguard Press to the extent of $155,000.

The publishing house of Macy-Masius was merged into the Vanguard Press in June 1928. For a short time the company operated under the joint direction of George Macy, president of Macy-Masius, and Jacob Baker, Vanguard's managing director.

With the onset of the Great Depression after 1929, Vanguard Press steadily moved away from radical political publications and toward more mainstream literary titles as well as apolitical titles of topical interest, such as studies of Charles Lindbergh and organized crime in Chicago.

Vanguard maintained its offices on Fifth Avenue in New York City, initially occupying space at 80 Fifth Avenue before moving to 100 Fifth Avenue in 1928. In the mid-1930s the firm moved to a new building in New York City, located at 424 Madison Avenue.

=== Sale to James Henle ===
In February 1932, James Henle, president of Vanguard Press for three years, became sole owner of the publishing house. A former labor reporter for the New York World, Henle signed a number of muckraking journalists. One of Vanguard's greatest successes was 100,000,000 Guinea Pigs (1933), an exposé about dangerous consumer products written by Arthur Kallet, who three years later would found the Consumers Union and Consumer Reports magazine. It was followed by a sequel nearly as successful called 'Counterfeit', in which the author called for the end of production for profit, and identified himself as a Communist.

Among many novels of social realism, Vanguard published more than 30 books by James T. Farrell. Those comprising his Studs Lonigan trilogy (collected in a single volume in 1935) and Donald Henderson Clarke's Female (1933) were the subject of bitter court fights on obscenity charges.

"Vanguard was singled out in the censorship controversies," wrote media historian John Tebbel, "not only because it published Our Fair City, edited by Robert Allen, a collection of essays demonstrating that civic corruption had not changed since the days of Lincoln Steffens, but because it had issued Calder Willingham's End as a Man, an indictment of military school life, and James Farrell's Studs Lonigan trilogy. Vanguard was also under investigation by the House Un-American Activities Committee on the ground that in the twenties and thirties it had published some books by Communist and left-wing writers. HUAC later apologized for the investigation." It was discovered that Vanguard had purged communists from the organization in the late 1940s, including founder Arthur Kallet.

The Vanguard Press earned a reputation for publishing promising new fiction, poetry, literature for children and young adults, and non-fiction. Vanguard published the first two books of Dr. Seuss and Saul Bellow, and the first books of Nelson Algren, Calder Willingham and Marshall McLuhan. It published Auntie Mame (1955), a comic novel rejected by a dozen publishers before it became a runaway bestseller. Vanguard published Pierre Boulle's The Bridge over the River Kwai (1954) and Planet of the Apes (1963). It published Joyce Carol Oates' first book, and 20 more – including her novel, Them, winner of the National Book Award in 1970.

Evelyn Shrifte, an editor who had joined the Vanguard Press in the early 1930s, became its president in 1952. She was one of the first women to head a book publishing company.

=== Sale to Random House ===
Evelyn Shrifte had been president of the Vanguard Press for 36 years when, in October 1988, the company was sold to Random House. She told The New York Times that the sale of the 62-year-old independent publishing house was prompted by the poor health of some of Vanguard's investors. The valuable 500-title backlist of the Vanguard Press was merged into that of Random House, although for 10 years they were to be identified on the title page as Vanguard Press books.

"Random House will take good care of our books and authors," Shrifte said. "But it's as if all my children were being sent to a foster home. I'm trying not to cry while I break the news to our authors."

The archives of the Vanguard Press from its conceptual origins in 1925 through approximately 1985, including over 129,000 documents, was donated by Random House to Columbia University in New York City in 1989. Evelyn Shrifte's papers are in the collection of Syracuse University.

=== Vanguard Publishing ===
An unrelated imprint, Vanguard Productions, was founded by J. David Spurlock in 1991. They registered their trademark in 2006: Trademark office Registration Number 3429227. Vanguard is commonly known as Vanguard Publishing with a primary website of "Vanguard Publishing.com" . As of 2014, the Vanguard publishing trademark reached "Incontestable" status under Section 15 of the Lanham Act. Vanguard has been critically acclaimed for their art books and graphic novels. Theirs is the only authorized, registered trademark for publishing of books under the brand name, Vanguard. Vanguard has granted limited co-existence agreements to the Vanguard Group, Vanguard Animation and Perseus Books Group.

=== Perseus Books Group ===
An unrelated imprint, Vanguard Press, was established in 2007 by Perseus publisher Roger Cooper. That short-lived line existed via agreement with registered trademark owners Vanguard Productions. Perseus dropped the line circa 2012 with all Vanguard publishing trademark rights remaining with Vanguard Productions.

== Authors ==
Authors' names are followed by their known dates of association with the Vanguard Press.

- Karin Abarbanel (1975)
- Leonard D. Abbott (1926)
- Raymond H. Abbott (1986)
- Mena Abdullah (1983)
- P. B. Abercrombie (1946)
- Frank Adams (1952)
- Jean Adhémar (1955)
- J. Bentley Aistrop (1955–1961)
- Elizabeth Perkins Aldrich (1942)
- Nelson Algren (1935)
- Mabel Esther Allan (1952–1974)
- Robert S. Allen (1947–1950)
- E. M. Almedingen (1964–1974)
- Gulielma Fell Alsop (1941–1947)
- Ian Andersen (1976–1978)
- Madelyn Klein Anderson (1983)
- Nels Anderson (1931)
- Raymond Andrieux (1943–1945)
- Samuel Antek (1963)
- Sebastian Juan Arbo (1955)
- R. Page Arnot (1927)
- Claude Arthaud (1956)
- Nancy Asbaugh (1971)
- Herbert Asbury (1928)
- Edith Lesser Atkin (1976)
- Wallace W. Atwood (1945–1975)
- Vickey Aubrey (1982)
- Michel Audrain (1955)
- Leonora Baccante (1931)
- Walter Bacon (1941–1961)
- Denys Val Baker (1947–1974)
- Jacob Baker (1937)
- Nancy C. Baker (1978–1980)
- Nina Brown Baker (1941–1948)
- Roger N. Baldwin (1927)
- Evelyn I. Banning (1965–1973)
- Jane R. Barkley (1958)
- Nigel Barley (1984)
- Harry Elmer Barnes (1929)
- James Wyman Barrett (1931–1941)
- Judith S. Baughman (1974)
- Julius Baum (1956)
- Charles A. Beard (1930)
- Cynon Beaton-Jones (1956)
- John Beecher (1980)
- David Belasco (1929)
- Edward Bellamy (1927)
- Saul Bellow (1944–1947)
- Marion Benasutti (1966)
- M. J. Benadette (1937)
- Lowell Bennett (1943–1945)
- Silas Bent (1931–1932)
- Ruth Berggren (1987)
- Alexander Berkman (1929)
- M. Bevan-Brown (1950)
- F. Russell Bichowsky (1935)
- Robert C. Binkley (1930)
- Robert Montgomery Bird (1928)
- Charles Blackburn (1980)
- John Haldane Blackie (1927)
- Robert Blatchford (1927)
- Godfrey Blunden (1956–1968)
- Sam Boal (1954)
- R. S. Boggs (1960)
- Alain Bombard (1957)
- Michael Bor (1984)
- Karl Borders (1927)
- James Boswell (1930)
- Jean Bothwell (1954)
- Phyllis Bottome (1956–1962)
- Pierre Boulle (1954–1986)
- Olwen Bowen (1969)
- W. E. Bowman (1956)
- George A. Boyce (1974)
- Emerson O. Bradshaw (1926)
- H. N. Brailsford (1927)
- Max Brand (1928)
- Evan Brandon (1955)
- Brian Branston (1958)
- Herbert Brean (1958)
- Jean de La Brète (1958)
- Ruth Brindze (1937–1973)
- George Britt (1931)
- Emma L. Brock (1961)
- Warren Edwin Brokaw (1927)
- Jocelyn Brooke (1955–1961)
- Heywood Broun (1931)
- Earl Browder (1936)
- George Mackay Brown (1984–1986)
- Howard Brubaker (1932)
- Matthew J. Bruccoli (1974)
- Matt Bryant (1954)
- Lamont Buchanan (1951–1952)
- Samuel Buchler (1933)
- Henry Thomas Buckle (1926)
- Mark H. Burch (1986)
- Mary Burlingham (1943)
- Ben Lucien Burman (1977–1980)
- Constance B. Burnett (1960–1965)
- Whit Burnett (1933–1934)
- Robert Elliott Burns (1932)
- John Burress (1952–1958)
- William Byrd (1928)
- Harold Augustin Calahan (1935–1944)
- Arthur Wallace Calhoun (1932)
- Hal Jason Calin (1954)
- Julian Callender (1958)
- William Camp (1968–1978)
- Ivan Cankar (1926)
- Edward Carpenter (1928)
- Helene Carter (1949)
- Rosario Castellanos (1960)
- Frances Cavanah (1961–1965)
- Cam Cavanaugh (1978)
- William Henry Chamberlin (1945)
- Winifred L. Chappell (1927)
- Virginia Chase (1971)
- Alfred Chester (1956–1957)
- B. J. Chute (1986)
- Donald Henderson Clarke (1929–1951)
- Robert S. Close (1947)
- Hannah Closs (1959–1967)
- Yvonne Cloud (1934)
- Frank O. Colby (1941)
- Kenneth Colegrove (1944)
- McAlister Coleman (1929)
- Groff Conklin (1951–1955)
- Cyril Connolly (1946)
- Sybil Conrad (1967)
- Brian Cooper (1956–1968)
- Lettice Cooper (1961–1963)
- Matthew H. Cooper (1984–1985)
- Frank Corsaro (1978)
- Irene E. Cory (1968)
- March Cost (1939–1973)
- Malcolm Cowley (1951)
- Edward P. Costigan (1940)
- Neil Cotten (1962)
- Sheila Cousins (1938–1939)
- Laurence E. Crooks (1938)
- Beverly Cox (1977)
- Cynthia Cox (1959)
- Leslie Croxford (1974)
- William Cunningham (1935–1936)
- Morgan Cunnington (1932)
- N. R. Danielian (1939)
- Clarence Darrow (1929)
- Harry Davis (1944)
- Stanley L. Davis Sr. (1977)
- Jean de la Brete (1958)
- Josué de Castro (1970)
- Floyd Dell (1929)
- Beatrice Schenk de Reginiers (1963)
- Robert De Vries (1954)
- Shirley Deane (1965–1968)
- Paul Dehn (1957)
- William Demby (1957)
- Mary Dennett (1930)
- Nigel Dennis (1955–1974)
- Patrick Dennis (1955–1956)
- Ann Wisema Denzer (1961)
- Roy Dickinson (1939)
- Pat Diska (1954)
- Ambrose Doskow (1935)
- Henry Burgess Drake (1929)
- John William Draper (1926–1927)
- Robert W. Dunn (1927–1950)
- James Francis Dwyer (1929)
- William Edge (1927)
- Monica Edwards (1950)
- Herbert B. Ehrmann (1933)
- Havelock Ellis (1936)
- Lord Elton (1961)
- Anne Emery (1946–1950)
- Duncan Emrich (1949–1950)
- Guy Endore (1934)
- Frederick Engels (1931)
- Abraham Epstein (1928)
- Rainer Esslen (1976)
- Jean Estoril (1961)
- Willie Snow Ethridge (1944–1973)
- Hilary and Dik Evans (1977)
- Nat Falk (1933)
- Rowena Farre (1942–1964)
- James T. Farrell (1930–1957)
- Howard Ferguson (1966)
- Frank Feuchtwanger (1954)
- Sara Bard Field (1949)
- Flora Fifield (1957)
- Charles G. Finney (1937)
- Alan E. Fisher (1941)
- Vardis Fisher (1939–1966)
- Bertrand Flornoy (1956)
- William Floyd (1930)
- Jonathan Titulescu Fogarty (1950)
- Martha Foley (1933–1934)
- Charles Henri Ford (1945)
- Ford Madox Ford (1963)
- Bertram B. Fowler (1936–1938)
- Marion Denman Frankfurter (1930)
- Edward Franklin (1964–1965)
- Myrtle Franklin (1984)
- Ellis Freeman (1940)
- Joseph Freeman (1930)
- Kathleen Freeman (1975)
- Herbert E. French (1942–1945)
- Martin Freud (1958)
- Albert W. Fribourg (1934)
- Elsbeth E. Fruedenthal (1940)
- Daniel Fuchs (1934–1937)
- James Fuchs (1926)
- Allen Funt (1952)
- Charles W. Gardner (1931)
- Gilson Gardner (1932)
- Roland Gant (1961–1968)
- Joseph Gantner (1956–1965)
- Eve Garnett (1937–1960)
- Richard Garnett (1963–1966)
- John Gee (1960)
- Theodor Geisel (1937–1938)
- Henry George (1929)
- Peter Gibbs (1956)
- John Gibson (1940)
- Margaret Gibson (1978–1980)
- Duff Gilfond (1932–1940)
- Jill Gill (1971)
- Daniel Gilles (1962)
- Margaret Gillett (1957–1967)
- Phillip Gillon (1952)
- Mary Elizabeth Given (1931)
- Seon Givens (1946–1963)
- Jay Gluck (1963)
- Rumer Godden (1951)
- Rube Goldberg (1954)
- Louis Golding (1958)
- Joseph Gollomb (1943–1949)
- Paul Goodman (1945–1947)
- Warren Goodrich (1957)
- Lev Goomilevsky (1930)
- Carroll Graham (1930–1934)
- Garrett Graham (1930–1944)
- Kathleen B. Granger (1966)
- C. Hartley Grattan (1929)
- Genevieve Greer (1946)
- Marcus Griffin (1933)
- Paul Griffith (1972)
- Geoffrey Grigson (1959–1969)
- Jane Grigson (1964–1967)
- Robert Gross (1979)
- John Groth (1945)
- Irmgard Groth-Kimball (1954)
- Ernest Gruening (1931)
- Dorothy Guck (1968)
- Bernard Guilbert Guerney (1943)
- Ernst Haeckel (1926–1927)
- Lynn and Dora B. Haines (1930)
- Charlotte Haldane (1950)
- T. J. Hale (1984)
- Thomas J. Hamilton (1943)
- Charles H. Hamlin (1927–1936)
- William A. Hamm (1927)
- Eric M. Hammel (1981)
- Cliff Hankin (1968)
- Alberta Pierson Hannum (1969)
- Jack Hardy (1927)
- Allanah Harper (1976–1987)
- Reed Harris (1932)
- Elsie Hart (1941)
- Ernest H. Hart (1977)
- Marion R. Hart (1938–1953))
- Rupert Hart-Davis (1985)
- Ilma Haskins (1973)
- Frieda Hauswirth (1930–1932)
- H. F. Heard (1941–1980)
- John Hearne (1961)
- Francois Hebert-Stevens (1956)
- Julius F. Hecker (1927)
- M. H. Hedges (1927)
- Eugene Heimler (1949–1960)
- Maurice Helbrant (1941)
- John Held Jr. (1930–1937)
- Ernest Hemingway (1945–1949)
- Theda O. Henle (1971)
- John M. Henry (1952)
- George W. Herald (1943)
- Fred Herman (1943)
- Garnett Hewitt (1981)
- William Heyen (1974–1981)
- Paul R. Heyl (1933)
- Earle Hill (1972)
- Howard Hillman (1975–1981)
- Helen Hinckley (1946)
- Thomas Hinde (1964–1966)
- Ira Hirschmann (1946)
- Amy Hogeboom (1945–1956)
- Elizabeth Sanxay Holding (1930)
- Janice Holland (1958)
- Oliver Wendell Holmes (1929)
- Ralph Y. Hopton (1934)
- M. A. DeWolfe Howe (1946)
- Jessie Wallace Hughan (1928)
- Rolfe Humphries (1937)
- Peter Hunt (1934)
- Edward Hunter (1951)
- Joan Hurling (1979–1981)
- Julian Huxley (1956)
- René Huyghe (1956)
- V. S. Ianovskii (1972)
- William Inglis (1932)
- Ann Ireland (1986)
- Susan Isaacs (1938)
- Panait Istrati (1930–1931)
- Vsevolod Ivanov(1935)
- Gardner Jackson (1930)
- Geoffrey Jackson (1974)
- Robert Jackson (1976)
- Bernard Jacobson (1979)
- Moritz A. Jagendorf (1938–1980)
- Leland H. Jenks (1928)
- Chris Jenkyns (1954)
- Edgar Jepson (1929)
- Eyvind Johnson (1960–1971)
- Eugene Jolas (1949)
- Bruce E. Jones (1987)
- Philip D. Jordan (1957)
- Franz Kafka (1946)
- Sholom J. Kahn (1957)
- Arthur Kallet (1935)
- David Karp (1953)
- Lila Karp (1969)
- Sara Kasdan (1957–1985)
- Monica Kehoe (1957–1961)
- Rick Kemmer (1975)
- Edna Kenton (1954)
- John Killinger (1980)
- George W. Kirchwey (1929)
- Elizabeth Kirtland (1958)
- Beate Klarsfeld (1975)
- George Kleinsinger (1948)
- Samuel G. and Esther B. Kling (1947)
- Melvin M. Knight (1928)
- Alexandra Kollontai(1929)
- Hazel Krantz (1961–1968)
- Miroslav Krleža (1972–1976)
- Peter Kropotkin (1926–1936)
- Joseph Krumgold (1935)
- Joseph Kloman (1934)
- Wolfgang Koeppen (1961)
- Delia Kuhn (1963)
- Shiv K. Kumar (1983)
- Suzanne Labin (1955)
- Harry W. Laidler (1926–1937)
- Alice Elinor Lambert (1932–1933)
- Richard Lannoy (1955)
- Garibaldi M. Lapolla (1931)
- Harold A. Larrabee (1928)
- Gosta Larsson (1941)
- Denise Lassimonne (1966)
- Emanuel H. Lavine (1930–1936)
- George Lawton (1949)
- Pauline Leader (1946)
- Sylvia Leao (1943)
- William Edward Hartpole Lecky (1926–1927)
- Jack J. Leedy (1986)
- Thomas B. Leekley (1956–1965)
- John Lehmann (1970)
- Madeleine L'Engle (1945–1968)
- Vladimir Ilyich Lenin (1926)
- Branko Lenski (1965)
- Frank Leslie (1960)
- Myron Levoy (1968)
- Grant Lewi (1935)
- Arthur H. Lewis (1955)
- Leslie Lieber (1954)
- Alfred Lief (1929–1931)
- Emanuel Litvinoff(1959)
- Robin Lloyd (1976)
- Amelia Lobsenz (1951)
- Edith Raymond Locke (1965)
- Robin Bruce Lockhart (1986)
- Jack London (1926)
- Gabrielle Lord (1983)
- Richard Lourie (1973)
- Constance Loveland (1958)
- Bruce Lowery (1961–1972)
- Mochtar Lubis (1963)
- Christopher Lucas (1974)
- Ferdinand Lundberg (1937)
- Mary Lutyens (1965–1967)
- John Henry Lyons (1942)
- Coleman McAlister (1929)
- Mary Frances McBride (1941)
- Neil McCallum (1951)
- Josephine McCarthy (1944)
- Marshall McClintock (1939–1941)
- Dwight Macdonald (1948)
- Bruce McGinnis (1979–1981)
- Thomas McGrath (1960)
- Ralph McInerny (1977–1986)
- Compton Mackenzie (1928)
- Norman MacKenzie (1965)
- Silas Bent McKinley (1941)
- Jim McKone (1966–1970)
- Robin McKown (1963)
- Marshall McLuhan (1951)
- Francis Elsmer McMahon (1945)
- E. S. Madden (1961)
- Leroy K. Magness (1975)
- Cecil Maiden (1960–1962)
- Gladys Malvern (1964–1972)
- Seon Manley (1959–1986)
- Alicia Markova (1961)
- Margaret Alexander Marsh (1928)
- W. Lockwood Marsh (1929)
- Ben Martin (1939–1940)
- Ron Martin (1986)
- Linda Marvin (1943)
- Karl Marx (1926–1931)
- Ray Mathew (1983)
- Norman H. Matson (1930)
- Julian Mayfield (1957–1958)
- Muriel Merkel (1985)
- Edith Patterson Meyer (1974–1976)
- Allan A. Michie (1939)
- Jane Miller (1947)
- Toni Miller (1954)
- George Fort Milton (1942)
- Edwin Valentine Mitchell (1946–1979)
- David Molnar (1929)
- Ferenc Molnár (1929)
- Paolo Monelli (1954)
- R. H. Montgomery (1940)
- Nancy Moore (1957–1963)
- Henry Morgan (1964)
- Peter Morland (1928)
- William Morris (1926)
- Nancy Brysson Morrison (1960–1969)
- Lona Mosk (1934)
- Marie Murphy Mott (1963)
- A. A. Murray (1957–1959)
- William Murray (1955)
- Paul Myers (1986–1987)
- V. S. Naipaul (1959–1960)
- Lensey Namioka (1979–1986)
- Kathryn Natale (1977)
- Terry Nation (1977–1978)
- Harry Edward Neal (1954)
- Alan Neame (1961)
- Scott Nearing (1926–1932)
- Richard L. Neuberger (1937)
- Martin Andersen Nexø (1938)
- Aage Krarup Nielsen (1936)
- Edna Nixon (1961)
- Francis Noel-Baker (1955)
- Seiji Noma (1934)
- Suzanne Normand (1929)
- E. S. Northrop (1933)
- Joyce Carol Oates (1963–1979)
- Lee Olds (1960)
- Patrick O'Mara (1933)
- Mark Oliver (1961)
- Franz Oppenheimer (1926)
- Ralph Y. Opton (1934)
- Evelyn Page (1964)
- Massimo Pallottino (1955)
- Bissell B. Palmer (1935)
- Dewey H. Palmer (1938)
- E. Clephan Palmer (1954)
- Rachel Lynn Palmer (1936)
- Derek Parker (1970)
- Albert Parry (1976)
- Catherine Owens Peare (1951–1987)
- Moshe Pearlman (1964)
- Roderick Peattie (1942–1952)
- Kendal J. Peel (1983)
- Ralph Barton Perry (1940–1944)
- Roger Peyrefitte (1953)
- M.C. Phillips (1934)
- Robert Phillips (1967–1979)
- Morris H. Philipson (1964)
- Carl Pidoll (1956–1961)
- F. A. Plattner (1957)
- Marcel Pobé (1956)
- Léon Poliakov (1965–1986)
- Louis Freeland Post (1926–1930)
- R. W. Postgate (1926–1936)
- Harford Powel (1949)
- Newman Powell (1977)
- Anthony Powell (1934)
- Fred Powledge (1979)
- Stanley Price (1961)
- Henry F. Pringle (1928)
- Eric Protter (1965–1985)
- P. J. Proudhon (1927)
- John Purcell (1944–1982)
- Barbara Pym (1957)
- Peter Rabe (1955)
- Gerald Raftery (1964–1967)
- Emily Raimondi (1974)
- Vance Randolph (1926–1934)
- Felix Ray (1932)
- Grantly Dick-Read (1950)
- John Reed (1927)
- Rosser Reeves (1980)
- Guenter Reimann (1939–1942)
- Ben Reitman (1931)
- Muriel Resnik (1956)
- Abraham Revusky (1935–1936)
- Frank Rhylick (1939)
- Phillip M. Richards (1957)
- Joanna Richardson (1952)
- James Fred Rippy (1931)
- David Roberts (1968–1970)
- Lura Robinson (1948)
- Paul Robinson (1977–1982)
- John W. Rockefeller Jr. (1962–1963)
- Harry Rogoff (1930)
- A. J. Rongy (1933)
- Frank Rooney (1954–1956)
- Sadie Mae Rosebrough (1951)
- Bill D. Ross (1985)
- George Maxim Ross (1960–1961)
- Holly Roth (1954)
- Carolyn Rothstein (1934)
- Herbert Ruhm (1961)
- John Ruskin (1926)
- Robert W. Russell (1962–1973)
- Peggy Rutherfoord (1958)
- Nicola Sacco (1920)
- Gordon Sager (1950)
- A. S. Sachs (1927)
- William St. Clair (1977)
- Jany Saint-Marcoux (1958)
- William Sansom (1945)
- Gordon Clark Schloming (1978)
- Alexander L. Schlosser (1933–1934)
- Michael Schmidt (1982–1987)
- L. Seth Schnitman (1933)
- Pearle Henricksen Schultz (1967–1975)
- Cathleen Schurr (1950)
- Delmore Schwartz (1979)
- Gabriel Scott (1928)
- Hardiman Scott (1984–1986)
- Grace Scribner (1927)
- Ronald Searle (1954–1959)
- Laurette Séjourné (1956)
- Elliot Selby (1960)
- Margaret Cabell Self (1966)
- Ramon J. Sender (1948)
- Toni Sender (1939)
- E. K. Seth-Smith (1957)
- Burr Shafer (1950–1963)
- Moshe Shamir (1958)
- William V. Shannon (1950)
- George Bernard Shaw (1926–1957)
- M. P. Shiel (1928–1937)
- Lee Shippey (1948)
- Hilda Simon (1969–1978)
- William Gayley Simpson (1935)
- Dorothy Rice Sims (1944)
- Upton Sinclair (1927–1931)
- Israel Joshua Singer (1938–1970)
- L. E. Sissman (1975)
- Paula Elizabeth Sits (1957)
- Edith Sitwell (1946–1970)
- Caroline Slade (1936–1948)
- Cornelius Slater (1987)
- Florence Slobodkin (1958–1986)
- Louis Slobodkin (1944–1986)
- Agnes Smedley (1938)
- Jessica Smith (1928)
- Pauline Smith (1927–1963)
- Ruth Smith (1946)
- Harry Sootin (1959–1960)
- Marcos Spinelli (1965)
- Benedict Spinoza (1943)
- Anne Nall Stallworth (1971–1984)
- Stella Standard (1946)
- Siegfried Stander (1984)
- Richard Stanley (1961)
- Michael Stapleton (1955)
- Bradley L. Steele (1988)
- Arthur Stein (1933)
- Charlotte Steiner (1943)
- Edith M. Stern (1934)
- Virginia F. Stern (1965)
- Clifford Stone (1976)
- Rex Stout (1929–1931)
- Flora Strousse (1962)
- Showell Styles (1956–1965)
- Edward Dean Sullivan (1929–1934)
- L. E. Sussman (1975)
- Clarence L. Swartz (1927)
- J. Carter Swaim (1965)
- O. Tanin (1936)
- Frank Tarbeaux (1930)
- Gordon Rattray Taylor (1954)
- Jay L. B. Taylor (1926)
- Courtenay Terrett (1930)
- Harrison Cook Thomas (1927)
- Norman Thomas (1926–1937)
- Francis J. Thompson (1953–1967)
- Henry David Thoreau (1930)
- Henry and Freda Thornton (1939)
- Doris G. Tobias (1948)
- Leo Tolstoy (1926)
- John Tully (1934)
- Geoffrey Trease (1945–1968)
- Newell R. Tripp (1927)
- Paul Tripp (1948)
- Johannes Troyer (1957)
- Benjamin Tucker (1926)
- Cyril T. Tucker (1965)
- Catherine Turlington (1948)
- Allan Turpin (1965)
- Parker Tyler (1948)
- Joseph W. Valentine (1963)
- Joseph Van Raalte (1931)
- Bartolomeo Vanzetti (1931)
- Thorstein Veblen (1926)
- Ilias Venezis (1956)
- Ange Vlachos (1964)
- Voltaire (1929)
- Robert Emmet Wall (1981)
- Stephen Walton (1967)
- James Peter Warbasse (1927)
- Betty Waterton (1980)
- Alan Watts (1953–1959)
- Edith Lucie Weart (1948)
- Harriett Weaver (1974)
- Etta Webb (1937)
- H. G. Wells (1927–1940)
- Virginia Weng (1980)
- Bruce Wery (1961)
- Charles H. Wesley (1927)
- Leon Whipple (1927)
- Leon F. Whitney (1954)
- Bette Ward Widney (1968)
- Ester Wier (1964)
- Oscar Wilde (1928)
- Ira S. Wile (1934)
- Geoffrey Willans (1954–1959)
- Annie Williams-Heller (1944)
- Calder Willingham (1947–1969)
- Lucy L. W. Wilson (1928)
- John K. Winkler (1929–1934)
- Stephen Winsten (1949)
- Ann Woddin (1985)
- Charles Erskine Scott Wood (1927–1949)
- Clement Wood (1926–1930)
- James Wood (1959–1969)
- William Wordsworth (1983)
- John M. Work (1927)
- Dale Worsley (1980)
- Wladimir S. Woytinsky (1961–1962)
- A. D. Wraight (1965)
- Helena Wright (1931–1932)
- Violet Wyndham (1958–1964)
- Yaacov Yannai (1965)
- Vassily S. Yanovsky (1972)
- Avrahm Yarmolinsky (1928)
- E. Yohan (1936)
- Robert York (1986)
- Art Young (1936)
- Hugh Zachary (1986)
- Arthur Zaidenberg (1956–1968)
- Marya Zaturenska (1974)

== Bibliography of titles published in the Garland Fund period (1926–1931) ==
Note: Dates of first edition included in parentheses when known, per direct observation of title pages, ABEBooks.com, and WorldCat.

=== Social Science Classics ===
- 1.John Ruskin, Ruskin's Views of Social Science. Introduction by J. Fuchs, editor.
- 2. Leo Tolstoi, War – Patriotism – Peace. Introduction by Scott Nearing, editor.
- 3. P.J. Proudhon, Proudon's Solution of the Social Problem. Introduction by Henry Cohen, editor.
- 4. Karl Marx, The Essentials of Marx. Introduction by Algernon Lee, editor. (1926)
- 5. Nikolai Lenin, Imperialism and The State and Revolution. (November 1926)
- 6. Peter Kropotkin, The Conquest of Bread.
- 7. Peter Kropotkin, Kropotkin's Revolutionary Pamphlets. Introduction by Roger Baldwin.
- 8. Jack London, London's Essays of Revolt. Introduction by Leonard D. Abbott. (December 1926)
- 9. H. G. Wells, Social Emancipation. Introduction by Harry W. Laidler, editor.
- 10. Edward Carpenter, Love's Coming of Age. (December 1926)
- 11. Thorstein Veblen, The Theory of the Leisure Class. (October 1926; first published in 1899)
- 12. Franz Oppenheimer, The State.
- 13. Henry George, Progress and Poverty. (abridged)
- 14. Benjamin R. Tucker, Individual Liberty. Introduction by C.L.S., editor.
- 15. Robert Blatchford, Not Guilty.
- 16. Peter Kropotkin, The Great French Revolution, 1789-1793. In two volumes. Translated by N.F. Dryhurst.

=== Social Philosophies ===
- 51. Clarence L. Swartz, What is Mutualism?
- 52. James Peter Warbasse, What is Cooperation?
- 53. Louis F. Post, What is the Single Tax?
- 54. Jessie W. Hughan, What is Socialism? (October 1928)
- 55. Alexander Berkman, What is Communist Anarchism?

Note: Although in 1928 Vanguard Press was announcing the title What is Communism? as "in preparation", it was not until 1936 that Vanguard published a mass market paperback by that title written by the General Secretary of the Communist Party USA, Earl Browder.

=== Current Questions ===
- 61. Charles H. Wesley, Negro Labor in the United States.
- 62. Coleman, Hayes, and Wood, Don't Tread on Me.
- 63. A.S. Sachs, Basic Principles of Scientific Socialism. (April 1927; previously issued by Rand School of Social Science in 1925.)
- 64. Harry Laidler and Norman Thomas, eds., New Tactics in Social Conflict: A Symposium. (1926; published for the League for Industrial Democracy)
- 65. Scott Nearing, The British General Strike. (late 1926)
- 66. Upton Sinclair, The Profits of Religion.
- 67. John M. Work, What's So and What Isn't. (1927; first published in 1905)
- 68. Warren Edwin Brokaw, Equitable Society and How to Create It.
- 69. Leon Whipple, The Story of Civil Liberty in the United States. (March 1927)
- 70. C.H. Hamlin, The War Myth in U.S. History.
- 71. Norman Thomas, Is Conscience a Crime? (March 1927; first published by Huebsch in 1923)
- 72. Scott Nearing, Where is Civilization Going? (April 1927)
- 73. Robert W. Dunn, Company Unions. Introduction by Louis Budenz.
- 74. B. Liber, The Child and the Home.
- 75. Harry Laidler and Norman Thomas, The Socialism of Our Times. (published for the League for Industrial Democracy)
- 76. Hugo Bilgram, The Remedy for Overproduction and Unemployment.
- No number. Charles Erskine Scott Wood, Heavenly Discourse. Drawings by Art Young. Frontispiece by Hugo Gellert. Foreword by Floyd Dell. (June 1927; published for The New Masses)
- No number. Harry W. Laidler and Norman Thomas, eds. Prosperity? A Symposium. (November 1927; published for the League for Industrial Democracy)

=== Studies of Soviet Russia ===
Note: Launched on the 10th Anniversary of the Russian Revolution. Series Editor was Jerome Davis.

- 91. H.N. Brailsford, How the Soviets Work. (November 1927)
- 92. Karl Borders, Village Life Under the Soviets. (November 1927)
- 93. Scott Nearing and Jack Hardy, The Economic Organization of the Soviet Union. (November 1927)
- 94. R. Page Arnot, Soviet Russia and Her Neighbors. (November 1927)
- 95. Julius F. Hecker, Religion Under the Soviets.
- 96. Avrahm Yarmolinsky, The Jews and Other Minor Nationalities Under the Soviets. (1938)
- 97. Anna J. Haines, Health Work in Soviet Russia. (March 1928)
- 98. Jessica Smith, Woman in Soviet Russia.
- 99. Robert W. Dunn, Soviet Trade Unions. (March 1928)
- 100. Lucy L.W. Wilson, The New Schools of Soviet Russia.
- 101. Roger N. Baldwin, Liberty Under the Soviets. (November 1928)

=== Fiction and Biography ===
- 111. Upton Sinclair, Love's Pilgrimage: A Novel. In Two Volumes.
- 112. William Edge, The Main Stem.
- 113. John Reed, Daughter of the Revolution and Other Stories. Introduction by Floyd Dell. (August 1927)
- 114. Grace Scribner, An American Pilgrimage: Portions of the Letters of Grace Scribner. L. Winifred, editor. (1927)
- 115. Edward Bellamy, Looking Backward.
- 116. William Morris, News from Nowhere.
- 117. Upton Sinclair, The Jungle.
- 118. Ivan Cankar, Yerney's Justice. Translated by Louis Adamic. (1926)
- 119. M.H. Hedges, Dan Minturn.
- 120. R.W. Postgate, Out of the Past.

=== Great Books Made Easy ===
- 141. Charles Darwin, The Descent of Man. Summarized by Newell R. Tripp.
- 142. Ernst Haeckel, The Riddle of the Universe. Summarized by Vance Randolph.
- 143. Henry Thomas Buckle, History of Civilization in England. Summarized by Clement Wood.
- 144. W.E.H. Lecky, History of European Morals. Summarized by Clement Wood.
- 145. John William Draper, History of the Conflict Between Religion and Science. Abridged by Sprading.
- 146. Lester F. Ward, Sociology. Introduction by Harry Elmer Barnes.

=== Educational Outlines ===
- 161. John Haldane Blackie, The ABC of Art. (August 1927)
- 162. Vance Randolph, The ABC of Evolution. (1926)
- 163. Vance Randolph, The ABC of Psychology.
- 164. Vance Randolph, Your Body: The ABC of Physiology. (1927)
- 165. Jay L.B. Taylor, The ABC of Astronomy.
- 166. Allison Hardy [pseudonym of Vance Randolph], Written in the Rocks: The ABC of Geology.
- 167. Vance Randolph, Flora and Fauna: The ABC of Biology. (1927)
- 168. Newell R. Tripp, The ABC of Chemistry.
- 169. Jay L.B. Taylor, The ABC of Physics.
- 170. W. Lockwood Marsh, Wings: The ABC of Flying. (1929)
- 171. H.C. Thomas and W.A. Hamm, Foundations of Modern Civilization: The ABC of History, Volume 1.
- 172. H.C. Thomas and W.A. Hamm, Civilization in Transition (1789–1870): The ABC of History, Volume 2. (January 1928)
- 173. H.C. Thomas and W.A. Hamm, In Our Times: The ABC of History, Volume 3. (1928)

=== American Imperialism ===
- No number. Melvin M. Knight, The Americans in Santo Domingo.
- No number. M.A. Marsh, The Bankers in Bolivia.
- No number. L.H. Jenks, Our Cuban Colony.

=== Miscellaneous titles ===
- No number. 1927 American Labor Year Book.
- No number. The American Labor Who's Who.

=== Unnumbered 1929 publications by author ===
- Harry Elmer Barnes, The Twilight of Christianity.
- McAlister Coleman, Pioneers of Freedom: Eleven Short Biographies. Introduction by Norman Thomas.
- Donald Henderson Clarke, In the Reign of Rothstein.
- Donald Henderson Clarke, Louis Beretti.
- H.B. Drake, The Children Reap.
- James Francis Dwyer, Evelyn: Something More than a Story.
- C. Hartley Grattan, Why We Fought.
- Oliver Wendell Holmes, The Dissenting Opinions of Mr. Justice Holmes. Introduction by George W. Kirchwey.
- Edgar Jepson, The Cuirass of Diamonds.
- Alexandra Kollontay, A Great Love.
- Ferenc Molnár, The Plays of Ferenc Molnár. Introduction by David Belasco.
- Scott Nearing, Black America.
- Suzanne Normand, Five Women on a Galley. Translated by G.S. Taylor.
- R.W. Postgate, That Devil Wilkes.
- M.P. Shiel, Cold Steel.
- M.P. Shiel, Dr. Krasinski's Secret.
- Rex Stout, How Like a God.
- Edward Dean Sullivan, I'll Tell My Big Brother.
- Edward D. Sullivan, Rattling the Cup on Chicago Crime.
- John K. Winkler, John D.: A Portrait in Oils.
- Charles Erskine Scott Wood, A Book of Tales: Being Some Myths of the North American Indians.
- Charles Erskine Scott Wood, The Poet in the Desert.
- Voltaire, The Best of All Possible Worlds: Tales and Romances. Introduction by Clarence Darrow.

=== Unnumbered 1930 publications by author ===
- Anonymous, Ex-"It" (With Guilty Acknowledgements to Ex-Wife, Ex-Husband, Ex-Mistress) – In which Fanny Hill Tells All. Illustrated by L.F. Grant.
- Robert C. Binkley, Responsible Drinking.
- James Boswell, The Conversations of Dr Johnson, selected from the "Life" by James Boswell. R.W. Postgate, editor.
- Louis Brandeis, The Social and Economic Views of Mr. Justice Brandeis. Alfred Leif, editor.
- Donald Henderson Clarke, Millie.
- Freda Hauswirth Das, A Marriage to India.
- Mary Ware Dennett, Who's Obscene?
- James T. Farrell, The League of Frightened Philistines: And Other Papers.
- William Floyd, People Vs. Wall Street: A Mock Trial.
- Joseph Freeman, Joshua Kunitz, and Louis Lozowick, Voices of October: Art and Literature in Soviet Russia.
- Lev Goomilevsky, Dog Lane.
- Carroll Graham and Garrett Graham, Queer People.
- Lynn Haines and Dora B. Haines, The Lindberghs.
- John Held Jr., Grim Youth.
- John Held Jr., John Held Jr.'s Dog Stories.
- Elisabeth Sanxy Holding, Dark Power.
- Panait Istrati, The Thistles of the Baragan. Translated by Jacques Le Clercq.
- Emanuel H. Levine, The Third Degree: A Detailed Account of Police Brutality.
- Norman Matson, The Log of the Coriolanus.
- Scott Nearing, The Twilight of Empire: An Economic Interpretation of Imperialist Cycles.
- Louis F. Post, The Prophet of San Francisco: Personal Memories and Interpretations of Henry George.
- Harry Rogoff, An East-Side Epic: The Life and Work of Meyer London.
- Nicola Sacco and Bartolomeo Vanzetti, The Letters of Sacco and Vanzetti. Marion Deman Frankfurter and Gardner Jackson, eds.
- M.P. Shiel, The Black Box.
- M.P. Shiel, The Purple Cloud.
- Rex Stout, Seed on the Wind.
- Edward Dean Sullivan, Chicago Surrenders.
- Frank Tarbeaux with Donald Henderson Clarke, The Autobiography of Frank Tarbeaux.
- Courtenay Terrett, Only Saps Work: A Ballyhoo for Racketeering.
- Henry David Thoreau, Thoreau: Philosopher of Freedom: Writings on Liberty. Introduction by James Mackaye.
- John K. Winkler, Morgan the Magnificent: The Life of J. Pierpont Morgan (1837–1913).
- Clement Wood, The Substance of the Sociology of Lester F. Ward.

=== Unnumbered 1931 publications by author ===
- James W. Barrett, The World, The Flesh, and Messrs. Pulitzer.
- Silas Bent, Justice Oliver Wendell Holmes.
- Heywood Broun and George Britt, Christians Only: A Study in Prejudice.
- Donald Henderson Clarke, Impatient Virgin.
- Donald Henderson Clarke, Young and Healthy.
- Frieda Hauswirth Das, Gandhi: A Portrait from Life.
- Mary Ware Dennett, The Sex Education of Children: A Book for Parents.
- Bailey W. Diffie, Porto Rico: A Broken Pledge.
- Charles W. Gardner, The Doctor and The Devil; or Midnight Adventures of Dr. Parkhurst.
- Mary Elisabeth Given, artist, The Lord's Prayer.
- Carroll Graham and Garrett Graham, Whitey: The Playboy of "Queer People" Runs Riot in Manhattan.
- Ernest Gruening, The Public Pays: A Study of Power Propaganda.
- John Held Jr., The Flesh is Weak.
- John Held Jr., Women are Necessary.
- Panait Istrati, The Bitter Orange Tree.
- Garibaldi M. Lapolla, Fire in the Flesh.
- Emanuel Levine, Gimme; or How Politicians Get Rich.
- Alfred Lief, editor. Representative Opinions of Mr. Justice Holmes. Foreword by Harold J. Laski.
- Scott Nearing, A Warless World: Is a Warless World Possible?
- Scott Nearing, Another World War: World War Comes with World Civilization.
- Scott Nearing: War: Organized Destruction and Mass Murder By Civilized Nations.
- Katharine Pollak and Tom Tippett, Your Job and Your Pay: A Picture of the World in which We Work.
- Vance Randolph, The Ozarks: An American Survival of primitive society.
- Ben L. Reitman, The Second Oldest Profession: A Study of the Prostitutes "Business Managers."
- James Fred Rippy, The Capitalists and Colombia.
- Joseph Van Raalte, The Vice Squad.
- Dean Stiff, The Milk and Honey Route: A Handbook for Hobos.
- Rex Stout, Golden Remedy.
- John K. Winkler, Incredible Carnegie: The Life of Andrew Carnegie (1835–1919).
- Charles Erskine Scott Wood, Too Much Government.
- Helena Wright, The Sex Factor in Marriage: A Book for Those Who Are About to Be Married. Introductions by A. Herbert Gray and Abel Gregg.
