= John Romano (writer) =

American screenwriter

John Romano (born October 2, 1948) is an American screenwriter and television writer and producer.

== Life and career ==
Romano is a graduate of Colgate University and holds a Ph.D. from Yale in English and Comparative Literature. Before moving to Los Angeles in 1986 to join the staff of Hill Street Blues. he published a book on Charles Dickens ("Dickens and Reality"), taught English at Columbia University and was a frequent book-reviewer at The New York Times.

In movies, his credits include The Lincoln Lawyer (from the novel by Michael Connelly), Nights in Rodanthe, Intolerable Cruelty, and The Third Miracle.

In TV, Romano was Emmy-nominated for the final episode of Hill Street Blues. His credits include L.A. Law, Cop Rock, American Dreams, Party of Five, Third Watch, Monk, Banshee, and Hell on Wheels. In addition, he created three series of his own, Class of ’96, Sweet Justice, and (with Nicholas Pileggi) Michael Hayes, starring David Caruso—as well as rewriting the pilot for Fox’s 24.

Romano has lectured on the humanities in film and television at the National Endowment for the Humanities, Princeton, USC, and MIT, as well as writing for Newsweek on the subject of violence in the media, and appearing before the House Committee on International Affairs just after September 11, 2001, on Hollywood's role in America's image abroad. He is a member of the Los Angeles Institute for the Humanities and a contributor to the Los Angeles Review of Books.

He has two daughters and lives in Santa Monica with his wife Nancy Forbes, whom he married in 1977.

== TV appearances ==
Romano appeared as a guest on Charlie Rose in the episode "Charles Dickens at 200" that aired on December 26, 2012, along with Simon Callow, Dr. Robert Douglas-Fairhurst, Jill Lepore, Declain Kiely, and Salman Rushdie.
