= Arthur Zaidenberg =

American painter and author (1903 - 1990)

- Born: 1903; New York, New York
- Died: 1990 (aged 86–87); San Miguel de Allende, Guanajuato, Mexico
- Education: Art Students League of New York,National Academy of Design
- Spouse: Anyone can Draw

A. Zaidenberg, Grandfather Clock (detail), watercolor, c. 1936, Index of American Design, National Gallery of Art, Washington, DC.

Arthur Zaidenberg (1903–1990) was an American painter and author. He is best known as the author of the book Anyone can Draw which was published in 1938.

Zaidenberg was born in New York City. Sources differ on his birth year. While the many sources list 1908 as his birth year, 1903 is listed as frequently, and The New York Times obituary lists his death age as 88, which confirms a 1903 birth year.

Zaidenberg attended the Art Students League of New York, the National Academy of Design, the Beaux-Arts de Paris, and other European schools. He went on to teach at New York University, where he was the first professor there to use nude models.

Zaidenberg created illustrations for the Index of American Design. These illustrations are part of the collection in the National Gallery of Art. In 1938 his book Anyone can Draw was published.

During World War II, Zaidenberg served in the United States Army Signal Corps. He lived in Woodstock, New York for several decades, and spent the last years of his life in an art colony in Mexico. Zaidenberg died in San Miguel de Allende in 1990.

His work is in the collection of the Brooklyn Museum, Metropolitan Museum of Art, and the Smithsonian American Art Museum.
