= Robert Phillips (poet) =

American poet and academic (1938–2022)

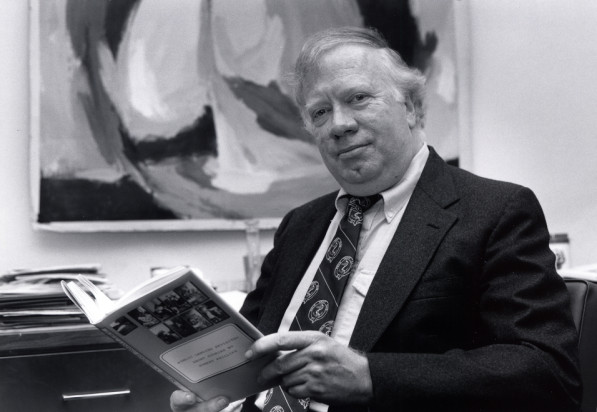
- Born: 1938; Milford, Delaware
- Died: January 21, 2022 (aged 84); Houston, Texas
- Education: Syracuse University
- Occupation: advertising
- Spouse: Judith Anne Bloomingdale
- Children: 1
- Writing career
- Genres: Poetry, fiction, non-fiction

Robert Schaeffer Phillips (1938 – January 21, 2022) was an American poet and professor of English at the University of Houston. He was the author or editor of more than 30 volumes of poetry, fiction, poetry criticism and other works.

== Early life and education ==
Phillips was born in Milford, Delaware in 1938 to Thomas Allen Phillips and Katheryn Schaeffer Phillips. He attended schools within the Milford School District. Phillips received B.A. (1960) and M.A. (1963) degrees double majoring in journalism and English literature from Syracuse University.

== Career ==
After graduation, Phillips remained at Syracuse, taking a position as an Assistant Director of Admissions, which Phillips called his least interesting job because the students kept asking the same questions. He also taught English.

He found an advertising job with Benton & Bowles in New York City in the 1960s and liked it because it combined his interest in writing, art, writing.). He worked on accounts for Revlon, Clearasil, and Ford Motor Company. He was a copywriter and vice president with Benton & Bowles, J. Walter Thompson and BBDO. He and his wife took a position in the Dusseldorf, Germany office of Grey Global Group, where he had opportunities to travel to places like Paris and London. Eventually he returned to New York and worked at several other agencies.

After work, he continued to write poetry and fiction. His first book, Inner Weather was published in 1966. He continued publishing while working in advertising, while teaching creative writing part time at the New School at nights. Eventually, he decided to teach full time.

In 1991, Phillips became a member of the creative writing faculty at the University of Houston, where he remained until his retirement in 2009. He later directed the Creative Writing Program there from 1991 to 1996). His predecessor was Donald Barthelme.

Phillips served as the chairman of the Poets' Prize and the Players's clubin New York City.

== Honors and awards ==
Phillip's writings have received a Pushcart Prize, an American Academy of Arts and Letters Award in Literature, a New York State Council on the Arts CAPS Grant in Poetry, MacDowell Colony and Yaddo Fellowships, a NPR Syndicated Fiction Project Award, Enron Teaching Excellence Award (1996), George Arents Pioneer Medal Award, Syracuse University's highest honor for alumni (1988), and Texas Institute of Letters membership.

In 1998 he was named a John and Rebecca Moores Scholar at University of Houston.

=== Legacy ===
Starting in 2001, the Texas Review in coordination with Sam Houston State University has offered an annual prize bearing Phillips' name for a distinguished poetry chapbook. Starting in 2019, the award includes a $500 advance and publication with Texas A&M University Press.

A collection of Phillips's work & personal papers, the Robert S. Phillips Papers, is housed in the Special Collections Research Center of Bird Library at Syracuse University. The collection contains his correspondence, writings, and memorabilia such as programs and announcements and issues of various periodicals in which Phillips’ work appears.

== Personal life ==
Phillips married Judith Anne Bloomingdale, whom he met in English class at Syracuse. They would eventually marry in the Hendricks Chapel.

== Books Published -- Poetry and Fiction ==
- Inner Weather (Golden Quill Press, 1966).
- Moonstruck: An Anthology of Lunar Poetry. Anthology of Classic and 20th century poets. (Edited). (Vanguard Press, 1973).
- The Land of Lost Content. Stories. (Vanguard Press, 1970)
- Circumstances Beyond Our Control: Poems (Johns Hopkins: 2006)
- The Pregnant Man (Doubleday, 1978) (nominated for the Pulitzer Prize)
- Running on Empty (Doubleday, 1981)
- Personal Accounts: New & Selected Poems 1966-1986 (Ontario Review Press, 1986). According to the preface, 1/3 of the poems are new. The earlier poems were selected from Inner Weather, Pregnant Man and Running on Empty. Some of these previously published poems have been revised since the earlier publication.
- The Wounded Angel (Brighton Press)
- Public Landing Revisited (Story Line Press)
- Breakdown Lane (Johns Hopkins University Press, 1994)
- Spinach Days (Johns Hopkins University Press, 2000)
- News About People You Know. Collected Stories. (Texas Review Press, 2002)
- Now & Then: New and Selected Poems. (Ashland Poetry Press, 2009).
- Ice House Sketches. (Texas Review Press, 2011).

== Books Published - Critical Studies, Nonfiction, Works Edited ==
- Confessional Poets. Literary criticism reviewing the genre—with leading practitioners such Robert Lowell, Anne Sexton, W. D. Snodgrass, and John Berryman, (Southern Illinois University Press, 1973).
- Denton Welch (Twayne's English Authors). Critical introduction. (Twayne Pub, 1974).
- Aspects of Alice: Lewis Carroll's Dream Child as Seen Through the Critics' Looking-glasses. Collection of essays selected and introduced by Phillips. (Harmondsworth/Penguin Books, 1974)
- Delmore Schwartz and James Laughlin: Selected Letters (Editor). (W. W. Norton: 1978).
- William Goyen. Critical introduction. (Twayne Publishers, 1979).
- The Stories of Denton Welch. (Dutton, 1986).
- Shenandoah: And Other Verse Plays by Delmore Schwartz (Editor). (BOA Editions, 1991).
- New Selected Poems of Marya Zaturenska (Editor) (Syracuse University Press, 2001).
- The Madness of Art (Syracuse University Press, 2003). Interviews with William Goyen, Philip Larkin, Joyce Carol Oates, Karl Shapiro, William Jay Smith, Elizabeth Spencer, William Styron, and Marya Zaturenska.
- William Goyen: Selected Letters from a Writer’s Life. (Editor). (University of Texas Press, 2014).
- Coda: Last Poems of Karl Jay Shapiro, Edited. (Texas Review Press, 2008).
