= Where Are You Going, Where Have You Been?: Selected Early Stories =

1993 anthology of short fiction by Joyce Carol Oates

- First edition
- Author: Joyce Carol Oates
- Language: English
- Publisher: Ontario Review Press
- Publication date: 1993
- Publication place: United States
- Media type: Print (hardback)
- Pages: 522
- ISBN: 978-0865380776

Where Are You Going, Where Have You Been?: Selected Early Stories is an anthology of short fiction by author Joyce Carol Oates published in 1993 by Ontario Review Press. The contents represent work collected between 1963 and 1977, as well as two uncollected stories.

== Contents ==
The volumes in which the selected stories were first collected are provided below, and the periodicals in which they were originally published are indicated where applicable.

By the North Gate (1963)

- "Edge of the World"
- "The Fine White Mist of Winter" (Literary Review, Spring 1962)

Upon the Sweeping Flood and Other Stories (1966)

- "First Views of the Enemy" (Prairie Schooner, Spring 1964)
- "At the Seminary" (Kenyon Review, Summer 1965)
- "What Death With Love Should Have to Do" (Literary Review, Autumn 1965)
- "Upon the Sweeping Flood" (Southwest Review, Spring 1963)

The Wheel of Love and Other Stories (1970)

- "In the Region of Ice" (The Atlantic, August 1966)
- "Where Are You Going, Where Have You Been?" (Epoch, Fall 1966)
- "Unmailed, Unwritten Letters" (The Hudson Review, Spring 1969)
- "Accomplished Desires" (Esquire, May 1968)
- "How I Contemplated the World from the Detroit House of Correction and Began My Life Over Again" (TriQuarterly, Spring 1969)
- "Four Summers" (Yale Review, Spring 1967)

Marriages and Infidelities (1972)

- "Love and Death" (Atlantic Monthly, June 1970)
- "By the River" (December, December 1968)
- "Did You Ever Slip on Red Blood?" (Harper's Magazine, April 1972)
- "The Lady With the Pet Dog" (The Partisan Review, Spring 1972)
- "The Turn of the Screw" (The Iowa Review, Spring 1971)
- "The Dead" (McCall's, July 1971)

The Goddess and Other Women (1974)

- "Concerning the Case of Bobby T." (The Atlantic, February 1973)
- "In the Warehouse" (The Transatlantic Review, Summer 1967)
- "Small Avalanches" (Cosmopolitan, November 1972)

Night-Side: Eighteen Tales (1977)

- "The Widows" (The Hudson Review, Spring 1975)
- "The Translation" (TriQuarterly, Fall 1977)
- "Bloodstains" (Harper's Bazaar, August 1971)
- "Daisy" (Black Sparrow Press, limited edition)

Uncollected

- "The Molesters" (Quarterly Review of Literature, 1968)
- "Silkie" (The Malahat Review, July 1972)

== Reception ==
Publishers Weekly notes the thematic consistency of these early stories spanning 15 years and recommends the anthology as a suitable introduction to Oates's fiction:

The writer shows early signs of the sinister ingenuity and command of psychological nuance later fulfilled in other ways in other books ... cool-tempered yet seductive in her canny portrayals of innocence on the verge of defilement--and afterwards.

Literary critic Michael Harris at the Los Angeles Times identifies three stages of Oates's literary development in the collection: An early period of "raw primal power"; experimental treatments of classic works; and in the 1970s an engagement "with the major issues of her time".

We can see her building up to it here, working and reworking themes of feminism, race relations, mental illness, urban malaise and the violence that pulses just below the skin of American life.

== Sources ==
- Harris, Michael (1993). "Fiction: Where Are You Going, Where Have You Been?: Selected Early Stories". Los Angeles Times, April 11, 1993. Accessed April 19, 2025.
- Oates, Joyce Carol (1993). Where Are You Going, Where Have You Been?: Selected Early Stories. Ontario Review Press, Princeton, N.J. ISBN 978-0865380776
