= 1st Independent Spirit Awards =

US independent film awards in 1986

- Date: March 22, 1986
- Site: Los Angeles, California, U.S.
- Hosted by: Peter Coyote; Jeanne Lucas

Highlights
- Best Film: After Hours
- Most awards: After Hours (2); Blood Simple (2); The Trip to Bountiful (2)
- Most nominations: After Hours (5); Blood Simple (5); Smooth Talk (5)

The 1st Independent Spirit Awards, honoring the best in independent filmmaking for 1985, were announced on March 22, 1986. The ceremony was hosted by Peter Coyote and Jeanne Lucas. It was held at 385 North, a restaurant in Los Angeles.

== Winners and nominees ==
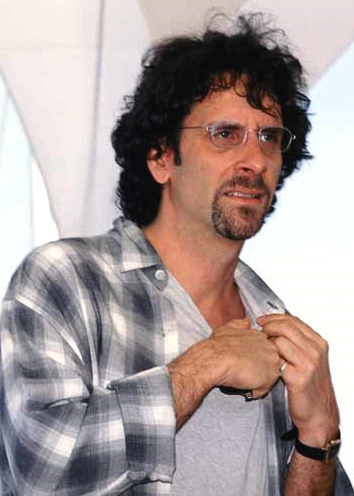
Joel Coen, Best Director co-winner

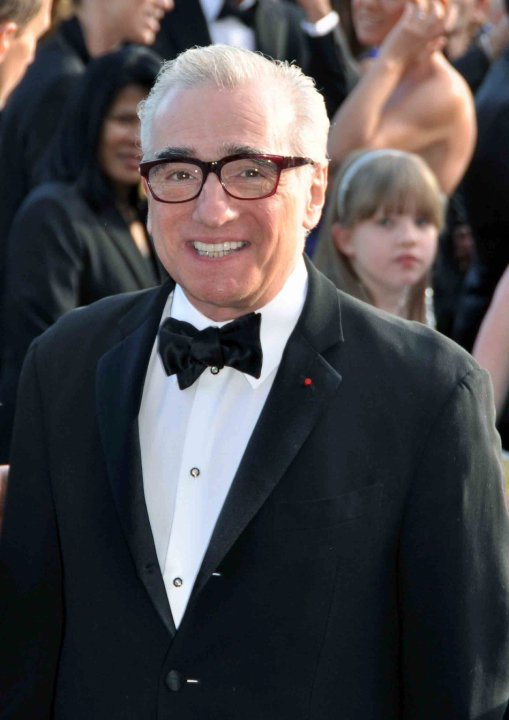
Martin Scorsese, Best Director co-winner

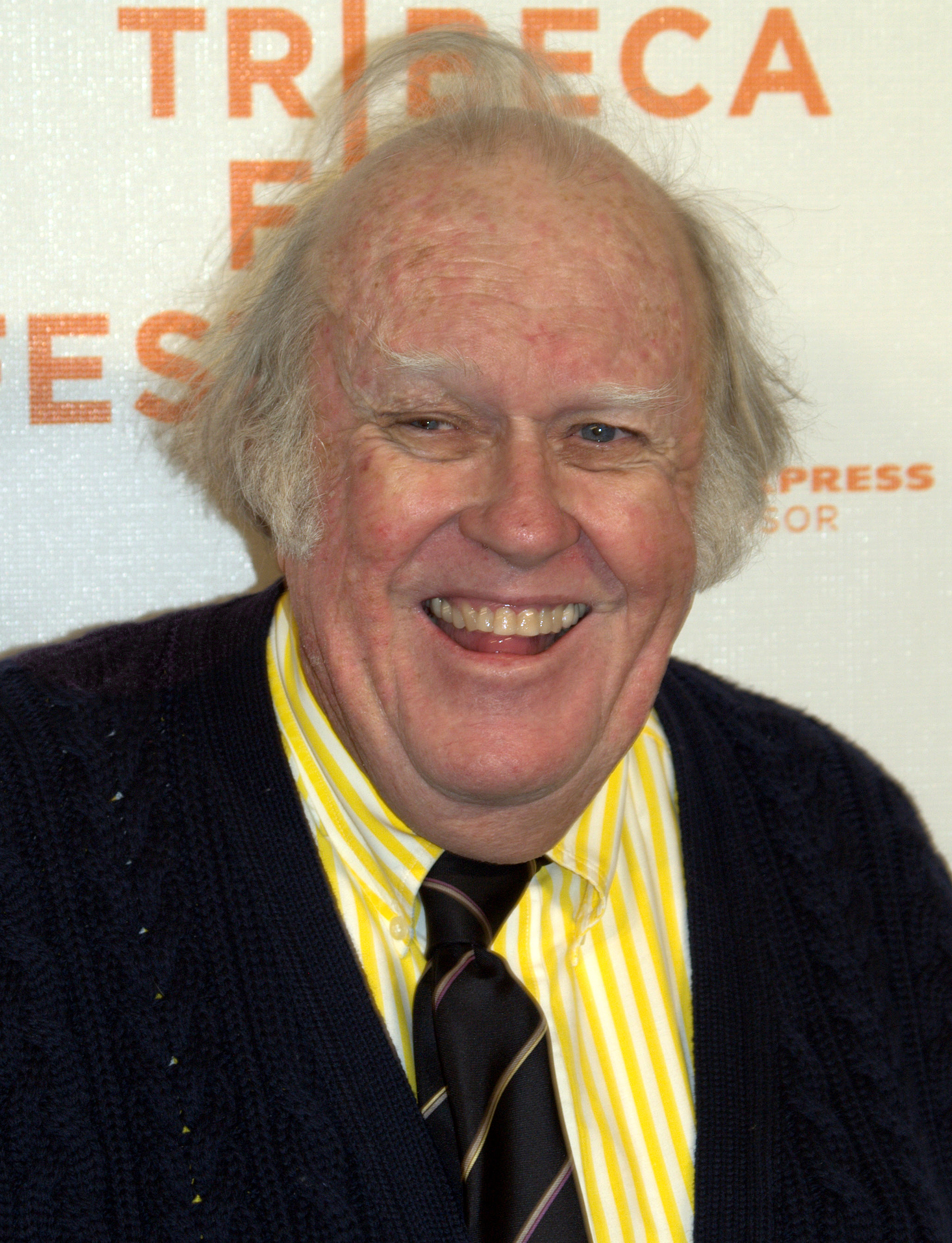
M. Emmet Walsh, Best Male Lead winner

Best Feature	Best Director
After Hours: Blood Simple; Smooth Talk; The Trip to Bountiful	Joel Coen – Blood Simple Martin Scorsese – After Hours: Joyce Chopra – Smooth Talk; Peter Masterson – The Trip to Bountiful
Best Actor	Best Actress
M. Emmet Walsh – Blood Simple: Rubén Blades – Crossover Dreams; Tom Bower – Wildrose; Treat Williams – Smooth Talk	Geraldine Page – The Trip to Bountiful: Rosanna Arquette – After Hours; Laura Dern – Smooth Talk; Lori Singer – Trouble in Mind
Best Screenplay	Best Cinematography
The Trip to Bountiful – Horton Foote: After Hours – Joseph Minion; Blood Simple – Joel Coen and Ethan Coen; Smooth Talk – Tom Cole	Trouble in Mind – Toyomichi Kurita: After Hours – Michael Ballhaus; Blood Simple – Barry Sonnenfeld; Dim Sum: A Little Bit of Heart – Michael Chin
Best International Film
Kiss of the Spider Woman: Dreamchild; The Hit; Ran

=== Films with multiple nominations and awards ===
Films that received multiple nominations
Nominations	Film
5	After Hours
5	Blood Simple
5	Smooth Talk
4	The Trip to Bountiful
2	Trouble Mind

Films that won multiple awards
Awards	Film
2	After Hours
2	Blood Simple
2	The Trip to Bountiful

== Special Distinction Award ==
David Puttnam

== See also ==
- 58th Academy Awards
