= By the North Gate =

Collection of short stories by Joyce Carol Oates

- First edition
- Author: Joyce Carol Oates
- Language: English
- Publisher: Vanguard Press
- Publication date: 1963
- Publication place: United States
- Media type: Print (hardcover)
- Pages: 253 (first edition)
- Followed by: With Shuddering Fall

Epigraph to the collection from which Oates selected the title of the collection: By the North Gate, the wind blows full of sand
Lonely from the beginning of time until now
Trees fall, the grass grows yellow with autumn
I climb the towers and towers to watch out the barbarous land —Chinese Poet La Bai (701-762 B. C.)

By the North Gate is a collection of short stories by Joyce Carol Oates. It was the author's first book, first published by Vanguard Press in 1963.

It was last published in 1971 by Fawcett. Two stories in the collection, "Edge of the World" and "The Fine White Mist of Winter", were later collected in her book Where Are You Going, Where Have You Been?: Selected Early Stories (1993).

== Stories ==
Those stories first appearing in literary journals are indicated.

- "Swamps"
- "The Census Taker"
- "Ceremonies"
- "Sweet Love Remembered" (Epoch, Spring 1960)
- "Boys at a Picnic"
- "Pastoral Blood"
- "An Encounter With the Blind"
- "Images"
- "Edge of the World"
- "A Legacy" (Arizona Quarterly, Summer 1961)
- "In the Old World" (Mademoiselle, August 1959)
- "The Fine White Mist of Winter" (Literary Review, Spring 1962)
- "The Expense of Spirit"
- "By the North Gate"

== Critical assessment ==
Oates, who was born in 1938, grew up in the post-Depression years in rural upstate New York. The stories in this collection, set in a fictitious "Eden County", depict the "dispossessed characters" who occupy its social and economic landscape. Literary critic Greg Johnson writes that the stories "provide a carefully detailed portrait post-Depression rural poor; they investigate women's experience in a patriarchal mid-twentieth century culture that conformed to long-standing social, religious and family models..." Johnson adds that "By the North Gate investigates virtually all the important themes that characterize her dozens of subsequent books [and] contains several of her finest stories."...set in the ironically named 'Eden County'..."

Most of the tales are set in a fictitious "Eden County" and depict rather rural scenes and characters, contrary to her later volumes, which are mostly set in an urban environment. Margaret Groppi Rozga sums up the characteristics of this volume as follows:

"These stories of the 1960s and 1970s remain so close to my heart as to constitute not just a part of my career as a writer but much of my private identity as a person. I think of them as, somehow, concentric; unfolding in time, thus seemingly linear and chronological, yet, in their essence, forming rings upon one another, rings that emerge out of rings, with By the North Gate, my first book, at its core.— Joyce Carol Oates from Afterword in Where Are You Going, Where Have You Been?: Selected Early Stories (1993)

The initial stories in By the North Gate portray a series of losses that define the condition of the contemporary world as Oates sees it. The Eden County in which several of them are set is hardly an echo of the paradise it might once have been. It is a world which values only material goods and whose characters set store not by their own consciences but by what they perceive to be the opinion of their fellows. Any deeper consciousness, and any sense of perspective on the present, is fractured, if it continues to exist at all. Consequently the quality of love, friendship, community, any unifying element, is also diminished. And it is such erosion and its alienating effects on the characters that the other stories in this volume show.

== Theme ==
Literary critic Greg Johnson provides this concise statement on the collection's thematic elements: "One of Oates's major themes is that writers, intellectuals, record-keepers—all those who attempt to describe and calibrate the contours of experience—are themselves summarily defeated by the swirling chaos of natural and social forces in Eden County."

== Sources ==
- Johnson, Greg. 1994. Joyce Carol Oates: A Study of the Short Fiction. Twayne's studies in short fiction; no. 57. Twayne Publishers, New York. ISBN 0-8057-0857-X\.y
- Johnson, Greg. 1987. Understanding Joyce Carol Oates. University of South Carolina Press, Columbia, South Carolina. ISBN 0-87249-524-8
- Oates, Joyce Carol. 1963. By the North Gate. Vanguard Press, New York. Library of Congress Catalog Card Number: 63-13790
- Lercangee, Francine. 1986. Joyce Carol Oates: An Annotated Bibliography. Garland Publishing, Inc. New York and London. ISBN 0-8240-8908-1
