= Sweet Love Remembered =

- Short story by Joyce Carol Oates
- Country: United States
- Language: English

Publication
- Published in: Epoch
- Publication date: Spring 1960

"Sweet Love Remembered" is a short story by Joyce Carol Oates, originally published in Epoch (Spring 1960). The work was first collected in By the North Gate (1963) by Vanguard Press.

== Plot ==
"Sweet Love Remembered" is told from a limited-omniscient point-of-view, and Amie as the focal character. The setting is a seaside resort on a Sunday in late summer. Her remembrances occur on a Sunday in Amie's childhood set in Oates's fictional rural Eden County.

The story opens when Amie, a sensitive young working-class woman, recalls an incident when she was a 14-year-old: attending a Sunday family gathering at home after church services. She waits for her younger brother, Jarley, to return from his walk to the nearby creek. This stranded memory seems "evoked for no reason."

The narrative returns to the present. Amie is walking to the diner where she serves as a waitress. A police officer briefly detains her, requesting her identification: the authorities are searching for a girl who has been reported missing in another county. Perplexed, Amie provides a social security card and is politely dismissed. Amie and her female co-workers have casually socialized with a number of the out-of-town boys. They amuse themselves by driving hot-rods on the beach. With the end of summer nearing, the pretty Amie no longer engages with them, aware of only of "a sweet luring hurt" and a "knowledge that the world was false and painful."

Amie is having a low-key summer affair with a middle-aged gentleman, married with children, and identified only as "her friend." He is a college professor - "quiet, faintly mournful" in appearance - who regularly picks her up after work to have an evening tryst in his automobile. She is troubled by the "vulgarity and cheapness" of the diner and the affair. Her thoughts return to Jarley: in memory, she sees him running towards the house from the creek in a downpour of rain, his knee bleeding profusely. In her recollection, Amie acknowledges to herself her deep love for her brother, a love she can never reveal to him.

Amie and her "friend" depart together at the end of her shift. A group of the boys mock her as they walk to his car: "You don't have any money...aren't you sorry?" Parked near the beach, Amie feels the sordidness of her relationship with the man, and retreats to the memory of her brother, "the voiceless love of that time, the frailty of that love".

== Theme ==
"Amie is clearly doomed—despite her sensitivity and the essentially loving, gentle nature her name suggests—to an adult female experience characterized by anxiety, fear, and paranoia."—Literary critic Greg Johnson in Joyce Carol Oates: A Study of the Short Fiction (1994)

The work "hauntingly dramatizes the theme of memory," in a counterpoint contrasting the heroine's deep, but undisclosed affection for her younger brother and a later affair with an older man.

== Sources ==
- Johnson, Greg. 1994. Joyce Carol Oates: A Study of the Short Fiction. Twayne's studies in short fiction; no. 57. Twayne Publishers, New York. ISBN 0-8057-0857-X
- Oates, Joyce Carol. 1963. By the North Gate. Vanguard Press, New York. Library of Congress Catalog Card Number: 63-13790
