= Joyce Chopra =

American film director (born 1936)

- Born: Joyce Ann Kalina; October 27, 1936 (age 89); Queens, New York City, U.S.
- Other name: Joyce Cole
- Education: Brandeis University
- Occupations: Film director; Television director; Documentary filmmaker
- Spouse(s): Amarjit Chopra (m. 1961, divorced) Tom Cole (m. 1969; died 2009)
- Children: 1

Joyce Chopra (née Kalina; born October 27, 1936) is an American film and television director and documentary filmmaker.

== Early life and education ==
Joyce Ann Kalina was born on October 27, 1936 in Queens, New York City to Abraham Kalina, a lawyer and future State Supreme Court Justice, and Tillie Kalina (née Ornstein), a teacher. Chopra has two brothers and was raised in a Jewish family in Coney Island and Sea Gate.

Chopra was educated at Abraham Lincoln High School, before studying Comparative Literature at Brandeis University. Chopra graduated in 1957.

== Career ==
Following graduation Chopra initially moved to New York to pursue acting, but later returned to Boston. In January 1958, Chopra opened Club 47 with Paula Kelley. The club was the subject of the 2012 film For the Love of the Music, shown at the Boston International Film Festival.

Her own film career began with documentary filmmaking in 1963 and gained much recognition by feminist film scholars with her autobiographical documentary Joyce at 34 (released 1974). The film stars Chopra and examines the effect her pregnancy had on her filmmaking career; it also followed Chopra's labour with her daughter Sarah, as she became the first person to give birth live on television. The documentary received the American Film Festival Blue Ribbon award. The film explores the issues surrounding women when pursuing the creation of a family while also creating a professional career.

Her next documentary project was a trilogy of short films. Matina Horner: Portrait of a Person (1973) focused on the titular professor and president of Radcliffe College, Girls at 12 (1975) examined the transition of young girls into teenagers, and Clorae and Albie (1976) examines the lives of two young black women in Boston who have been best friends since childhood but are starting to drift apart on different paths.

Chopra transitioned into fiction film making around the mid-1980s after meeting and working with Tom Cole. One of their first collaborations was a PBS American Playhouse production Medal of Honor Rag in 1982.

Her first narrative feature-length film, Smooth Talk (1985), was nominated for the Independent Spirit Award for Best Director and won the Grand Jury Prize at the 1985 Sundance Film Festival. The film is an adaptation of Joyce Carol Oates' 1966 short story, "Where Are You Going, Where Have You Been?", and was adapted by Tom Cole.

Her second feature-length film, The Lemon Sisters, was made in conjunction with producer and star Diane Keaton. The film explores the long-term female friendships between Eloise (Keaton), Franki (Carol Kane) and Nola (Kathryn Grody). After The Lemon Sisters, Chopra turned to directing television, ranging from television dramas to made-for-TV movies.

In addition to directing her own films, Chopra is part of BYKids, a nonprofit pairing filmmakers with youth from around the world to create short documentaries. My Beautiful Nicaragua, a 24-minute documentary about the devastating effects of climate change on coffee production in Nicaragua.

=== Themes ===
Much of Chopra's work treats the themes of sexuality and sensuality of women. These films often focus on the transitional periods in women's lives. Girls at 12 and Smooth Talk are concerned with puberty; Joyce at 34 focuses on pregnancy; and The Lemon Sisters centers around new loves, lifestyles, and new career choices. Her other works — mostly documentaries — focus on youth.

== Personal life ==
In 1961, Chopra married Amarjit Chopra. The couple later divorced.

Chopra married Tom Cole in 1969. Together Chopra and Cole had one child.

== Filmography ==
Fiction:

- Smooth Talk (1985)
- The Lemon Sisters (1990)

Documentary:

- A Happy Mother's Day (1963) co-directed with Richard Leacock
- Joyce at 34 (1974)
- Girls at 12 (1975)
- Clorae & Albie (1976)
- That Our Children Will Not Die (1978)
- Martha Clarke, Light and Dark (1981)
- Music Lessons (1981)
- Gramercy stories (2008)
- Fire in Our Hearts (2012)

Made-for-TV movies:

- Murder in New Hampshire: The Pamela Wojas Smart Story (1991)
- Baby Snatcher (1992)
- The Danger of Love: The Carolyn Warmus Story (1992)
- The Disappearance of Nora (1993)
- Angel Falls (1993) TV Series
- The Corpse Had a Familiar Face (1994)
- Deadline for Murder: From the Files of Edna Buchanan (1995)
- My Very Best Friend (1996)
- L.A. Johns (1997)
- Convictions (1997)
- Murder in a Small Town (1999)
- Replacing Dad (1999)
- The Lady in Question (1999)
- Rip Girls (2000)
- Blonde (2001)
- Hollywood Wives: The New Generation (2003)
- The Last Cowboy (2003)
- Molly: An American Girl on the Home Front (2006)

TV series:

- PBS American Playhouse Medal of Honor, Rag (1982)
- Everwood
- Crossing Jordan
- Law & Order: Criminal Intent
- Law & Order: Special Victims Unit

== Publications ==
- Lady Director: Adventures in Hollywood, Television and Beyond, published by City Lights Books. 11/08/2022. ISBN 9780872868687.

== Awards and nominations ==
Award	Year	Category	Nominated work	Result	Ref(s)
American Film Festival	1978	Blue Ribbon award	That Our Children Would Not Die	Won	
Sundance Film Festival	1986	Grand Jury Prize Dramatic	Smooth Talk	Won	
Film Independent Spirit Awards	1986	Independent Spirit Award for Best Film	Smooth Talk	Nominated	
Film Independent Spirit Awards	1986	Independent Spirit Award for Best Director	Smooth Talk	Nominated	
Directors Guild of America	2006	Outstanding Directorial Achievement in Children's Programs	Molly: An American Girl on the Home Front	Nominated	
