= Bodies (short story) =

- Short story by Joyce Carol Oates
- Country: United States
- Language: English

Publication
- Published in: Harper's Bazaar
- Publication date: February 1970

"Bodies" is a short story by Joyce Carol Oates originally published in Harper's Bazaar (February 1970), and first collected in The Wheel of Love and Other Stories (1970) by Vanguard Press.

== Plot ==
Pauline Ressner is a 29-year-old instructor at an art institute. She is a sculptor, specializing in the human head. She lives with her mother in their Victorian era house. A tall, striking woman, she is single-mindedly dedicated to her work and fulfilled by it. She maintains a cool detachment from her students, who address her as "Miss Ressner". Though she is aware that her beauty is attractive to men and some women, she routinely deflects these advances. She has no social or sexual life.

Through a mutual acquaintance, Pauline is introduced to Anthony Drayer, a man in his mid-thirties who takes an immediate interest in her and attempts to engage her in casual conversation. He does not appear to have any vocation and she detects that he is not well-groomed. Annoyed, she politely excuses herself and departs. She subsequently sees Anthony repeatedly around the institute, and learns that he has made inquiries about her students. When Anthony approaches her again, she feels threatened, and attempts to dismiss him with a curt smile. He persists, asking her questions she finds offensive. He is clearly obsessed with her, but is good-natured. In desperation, Pauline blurts out: "I don't have time to talk to you. I don't go out with people, I'm not the way you think..." Anthony registers anger, and rebukes her. He encourages her to leave: "Don't run - I won't follow you!"

The encounter has traumatized Pauline, and she suffers from lurid, disturbing dreams. She has bouts of malaise. Pauline recalls that in her early twenties she had been in love with an elderly art instructor and two other men, both young. In all these, she drew near but regained control of her emotions, and nothing came of these: "So it had ended. She was complete...feeling totally herself once more."

At a local bookstore, Pauline is suddenly assaulted by Anthony, wielding a knife. He grabs her, and without a word, slashes his own throat. His blood splashes on her clothes as he falls dying at her feet. In the aftermath, Pauline's internal monologues and phantasmagorical images take hold of her mind. She is convinced that the madman's blood has spawned a fetus she carries in her womb.

As Pauline descends into madness, her mother commits her to a mental hospital.

== Theme ==
"Bodies" dramatizes a woman's "life-denying retreat from emotional and sexual involvement altogether" and "the consequences of a cold withdrawal from passional life." "

Literary critic Elizabeth R. Fishel observes that the women in Oates's fiction "live at a level of intensity which constantly verges on madness" and reminds readers that these stories "depend on violent melodrama for their activation."

"Bodies" is a case in point. In the sanguinary climax, Pauline is splashed with the blood of a suicidal maniac and, believing she has been impregnated by the bloody assault, descends into madness.

== Sources ==
- Creighton, Joanne V. 1979. Joyce Carol Oates. Twayne Publishers, New York. Warren G. French, editor. ISBN 0-8057-7212-X
- Johnson, Greg. 1994. Joyce Carol Oates: A Study of the Short Fiction. Twayne's studies in short fiction; no. 57. Twayne Publishers, New York. ISBN 0-8057-0857-X
- Oates, Joyce Carol. 1970. The Wheel of Love. Vanguard Press, New York.ISBN 978-0814906767
- Fishel, Elizabeth R. 1970. Books: The Wheel of Love and Other Stories. The Crimson, December 8, 1970. Books The Wheel of Love and Other Stories | Opinion | The Harvard Crimson Accessed December 30, 2024.
- Pickering, Samuel F. 1974. "The Short Stories of Joyce Carol Oates" The Georgia Review, Vol. 28, No. 2 (Summer 1974) pp. 218–226. The Short Stories of Joyce Carol Oates Accessed 30 December 2024.
