= The Disappearance of Nora =

- Genre: Thriller
- Written by: Gordon Greisman; Tom Cole
- Screenplay by: Alan Ormsby; Tom Cole
- Directed by: Joyce Chopra
- Starring: Veronica Hamel; Dennis Farina; Stephen Collins
- Theme music composer: Mark Snow
- Country of origin: United States
- Original language: English

Production
- Producer: Lee Rafner
- Cinematography: James Glennon
- Editor: Sidney Wolinsky
- Running time: 98 minutes
- Production company: Citadel Entertainment

Original release
- Network: CBS
- Release: March 7, 1993

The Disappearance of Nora is a 1993 thriller television film, starring Veronica Hamel and directed by Joyce Chopra.

== Plot ==
A beautiful woman is lost in the Las Vegas desert. She does not remember who she is or how she got there, so the manager of a casino makes offers to help.

== Cast ==
- Veronica Hamel as Nora Freemont
- Stephen Collins as Jack Fremont
- Dennis Farina as Denton
- Leon Russom as Maxwell
- Stan Ivar as Leland Sinclair
- David Steen as Ernie
- Jim J. Poslof as Eddie
- Alyson Reed as Phyllis
- David Boyce as Truck Driver
