= The Lemon Sisters =

1990 film by Joyce Chopra

- Film poster
- Directed by: Joyce Chopra
- Written by: Jeremy Pikser
- Produced by: Harvey Weinstein; Bob Weinstein
- Starring: Diane Keaton; Carol Kane; Kathryn Grody; Elliott Gould; Rubén Blades; Estelle Parsons; Richard Libertini; Aidan Quinn
- Cinematography: Bobby Byrne
- Edited by: Michael R. Miller; Joe Weintraub
- Music by: Dick Hyman; Howard Shore
- Distributed by: Miramax Films
- Release date: August 31, 1990; (USA)
- Running time: 93 min.
- Country: United States
- Language: English
- Budget: $9 million
- Box office: $3,473,905 (USA)

The Lemon Sisters is a 1990 American comedy-drama film from Miramax Films directed by Joyce Chopra and written by Jeremy Pikser. The film stars Diane Keaton, Carol Kane and Kathryn Grody. The film was both a commercial and critical failure after being shelved for more than a year with extensive revisions.

== Plot ==
Three lifelong friends work the bars in 1980s Atlantic City performing the songs of 1960s girl groups.

== Principal cast ==
Actor	Role
Diane Keaton	Eloise Hamer
Carol Kane	Franki D'Angelo
Kathryn Grody	Nola Frank
Elliott Gould	Fred Frank
Rubén Blades	C.W.
Aidan Quinn	Frankie McGuinness
Estelle Parsons	Mrs. Kupchak
Nathan Lane	Charlie Sorrell
Richard Libertini	Nicholas Panas
Sully Boyar	Baxter O'Neil

== Critical reception ==
Caryn James of The New York Times hated the film:

[The Lemon Sisters] inspires dazed disbelief that professional film makers could have made such an amateurish movie... Among the other wasted talents is the director, Joyce Chopra, who once made the exquisite, troubling little film Smooth Talk and seems to have lost her judgment here.
