= A Legacy (short story) =

- Short story by Joyce Carol Oates
- Country: United States
- Language: English

Publication
- Published in: Arizona Quarterly
- Publication date: 1961

"A Legacy" is a short story by Joyce Carol Oates, originally published in Arizona Quarterly in 1961. The story was first collected in By the North Gate (1963) by Vanguard Press. The story is set, as are others in By the North Gate, in Oates's fictional Eden County, similar to the rural upstate New York community where she was raised.

== Plot ==
"A Legacy" is written in the third-person omniscient point-of-view, with Laura Walpole, a child, the focal character.

Agricultural operations are underway in Eden County's rural community in spring. Laura is accompanying her father, a farmer, into town in his pickup truck. His only daughter, she has three older brothers: Kess, Tom and Evan.

Laura's father is uncharacteristically preoccupied and severe in his demeanor. Dressed in a black suit rather than his overalls, he warns his daughter not to tell her grandmother about the drive. The purpose of the trip is to visit her eldest brother, Kess, so she can "say goodbye." Laura has not seen her favorite brother for several months. What has transpired is a mystery to the child (She is too young to even comprehend the significance of a recent baptism she witnessed at church). Laura objects to the secrecy, and petulantly declares that Kess had been responsible for causing an accident that broke her leg summers ago. Her father reprimands and silences her.

They arrive at a broken down shack near the outskirts of town. Laura is suddenly anxious, but her father insists that she enter the house with him. Inside they encounter two strange men. Laura notes that one man is fat; the other wears a sheriff's badge. Laura vaguely discerns that her father is being treated with veiled contempt: the two men exchange chuckles. The fat man asks the father "Is this his sister?" adding "How come his ma never came in to see him? Or ain't you tole her yet?" Father and daughter are led into a dimly lit corridor by the sheriff, a sadist. He unlocks a door and, smiling—"caressing them softly and familiarly" with his eyes—they enter a room. Kess is seated on a cot smoking a cigarette.

He regards his father and sister blankly, devoid of emotion. Kess is so altered in appearance that Laura refuses to believe it is her brother and begins to sob. Kess speaks, objecting that his father brought his sister, adding: "But then it ain't anythin' to me now...It don't matter." Laura notes that her brother's formerly "fine blond hair" is now "without life."

Kess has been convicted of murder, having stabbed a man to death in a homicidal rage and now sentenced to death. At his father's insistence, he recounts the details of the killing, admitting he would repeat the crime again under the same circumstances. The father announces they must depart, but Kess momentarily detains them and acknowledges his sister. He crushes his cigarette on the wall, and hands the butt to her as a cynical memento. When Laura approaches the truck outside, she casts the butt on the ground, insisting that the figure she met in the room was not Kess. Her father demands she retrieve the memento.

On the way back to town, with the cigarette in her hand, Laura has a recollection. She is propped on the steps of a hay barn, her leg in a cast. Her brothers, Tom and Evan, have abandoned her. Suddenly, the 13-year-old Kess appears, grinning and mirthful, with a white hen in his arms, promising that the chicken will dance for his little sister. Laura bursts into peals of laughter, Kess grinning.

== Theme ==
The story reflects the post-Depression era landscape of Oates's youth (b. 1938) in rural upstate New York. Literary critic Greg Johnson characterizes "A Legacy" as "repositories of memory, reflection, and a bleak form of nostalgia."

== Sources ==
- Johnson, Greg. 1994. Joyce Carol Oates: A Study of the Short Fiction. Twayne's studies in short fiction; no. 57. Twayne Publishers, New York. ISBN 0-8057-0857-X
- Oates, Joyce Carol. 1963. By the North Gate. Vanguard Press, New York. Library of Congress Catalog Card Number: 63-13790
