= In the Region of Ice =

1976 film

- Directed by: Peter Werner
- Written by: Peter Werner
- Based on: "In the Region of Ice" by Joyce Carol Oates
- Produced by: Andre R. Guttfreund
- Starring: Fionnula Flanagan
- Cinematography: Stephen L. Posey
- Edited by: Michael Goldman
- Music by: Don Peake
- Production company: Center for Advanced Film Studies
- Release date: 1976
- Running time: 37 minutes
- Country: United States
- Language: English

In the Region of Ice is a 1976 American drama short film written and directed by Peter Werner, based on the 1966 short story by Joyce Carol Oates.

== Summary ==
The film reveals the complexities of the relationship between a nun and a disturbed student.

== Production ==
It was made as a thesis film for the Center for Advanced Film Studies. It won an Oscar at the 49th Academy Awards in 1977 for Best Short Subject. The Academy Film Archive preserved In The Region of Ice in 2012.

== Cast ==
- Fionnula Flanagan as Sister Irene
- Peter Lampert as Allen Weinstein (as Peter Lempert)
- Larry Curran as the priest in the office
