= Andre R. Guttfreund =

Salvadoran film director

- Born: November 6, 1946; El Salvador
- Education: Tufts University; American Film Institute Conservatory
- Occupations: Film director, film producer
- Years active: 1976–present
- Known for: In the Region of Ice

Andre R. Guttfreund (born November 6, 1946) is a Salvadoran film director, producer and filmmaker. He is better known for the production of the 1976 short film In the Region of Ice, for which he received an Oscar at the 1977 Academy Awards with Peter Werner for Best Live Action Short Film, becoming the first and so far only Central American to receive an Oscar.

== Biography ==
Guttfreund was the eldest of five children and the son of a Romanian actress and a German diplomat. As a kid, he studied at the Escuela Americana in San Salvador. When he was 13 years-old he travelled to the US and attended Verde Valley School in Sedona, Arizona, then he studied political science at Tufts University. He grew up bilingual, speaking Spanish and German. After his graduation in 1970, he received an invitation to get a Master in theater in London. After graduating from his master, Guttfreund was invited to El Salvador by Walter Béneke, the then Minister of Education of El Salvador, to start the Educative Television project with him. Guttfreund was director of the Educative Television project from 1971 to 1973. After that, he came back to the US and studied production and directing at the American Film Institute Conservatory and graduated with a Master of Fine Arts degree.

In 1976, Guttfreund produced his first film In the Region of Ice, and received the Oscar in the category of Best Live Action Short Film, becoming the first and so far only Central American to receive an Oscar. He also directed and produced films such as the TV movie A Perfect Match (1980), the film romance Breach of Contract (1982), the sports drama Abduction of Carry Swenson (1987), the dramatic Western Cabalgando con la muerte (1989) and the mystery drama Femme Fatale (1991), starring Colin Firth, Lisa Zane and Billy Zane. He has also appeared in various roles in television series in the United States and Spain, such as the dramatic series L.A. Law and Picket Fences and the comedy series Periodistas.

He worked at the José Simeón Cañas Central American University's and, university of El SalvadorCentro de Audiovisuales and at the Verde Valley School. He has been president of the Salvadoran Film and Television Association (ASCINE) from 2012 to 2016. In this capacity, he also worked as an adviser to the Ministry of Economic Affairs between 2014 and 2016, he served as an adviser to the Film and Audiovisual Coordination Council and was appointed special envoy by the Ministry of Foreign Affairs.

== Filmography ==
=== Film ===
Year	Title	Credited as					Notes
Year	Title	Director	Writer	Producer	Editor	Other	Notes
1976	In the Region of Ice	No	No	Yes	No	No	Short film
1980	A Perfect Match	No	Yes	Yes	No	No	Story writer
1982	Breach of Contract	Yes	No	No	No	No	
1987	The Abduction of Kari Swenson	No	No	Yes	No	No	
1987	The Little Match Girl	No	No	No	No	Yes	Supervising producer
1989	Cabalgando con la muerte	No	Yes	Yes	No	No	Screenplay and story writer
1990	Femme Fatale	Yes	No	No	No	No	
2012	Historias que dan miedo	No	No	No	No	Yes	Creative producer
2014	Malacrianza	No	No	No	No	Yes	Creative producer
2018	Relentless	No	No	Executive	No	No	
2019	Cachada: The Opportunity	No	No	Executive	No	No	

=== Television ===
Year	Title	Role
1988-1990	Knots Landing	Director; Episodes: "A Weekend Getaway" (1988), "The Spin Doctor" (1989) and "Out of Control" (1990)
1990	Superboy	Director; Episodes: "Brimstone" (1990), "Escape to Earth" (1990), "Revenge from the Deep" (1990) and "The Woman Called Tiger Eye" (1990)
1992-1993	L.A. Law	Director; Episodes: "Love on the Rox" (1992) and "Hello and Goodbye" (1993)
1994	Picket Fences	Director; Episode: "Terms of Estrangement" (1994)
1996	Second Noah	Director; Episode: "God's Last Laugh" (1996)
1999	Periodistas	Director; Episodes: "Una chiquillada" (1999) and "Fugas" (1999)
2001	The Color of War	Voice director
2013	Capitán Centroamérica	As "MUC"

== Videogames ==
Year	Title	Role
1999	Emergency Room 2	Director
2000	Code Blue	Director

== Awards ==
- Academy Awards 1977: Oscar winner in the category Best Live Action Short Film with In the Region of Ice.
