= The Wheel of Love and Other Stories =

Short story collection by Joyce Carol Oates

- First edition cover
- Author: Joyce Carol Oates
- Genre: Short story collection
- Publisher: Vanguard Press
- Publication date: October 6, 1970

The Wheel of Love is a collection of short fiction by Joyce Carol Oates published by Vanguard Press in 1970. The volume brought Oates "abundant national acclaim", including this assessment from librarian and critic John Alfred Avant: "Quite simply, one of the finest collections of short stories ever written by an American."

While the book itself is out of print, several of the stories—"Where Are You Going, Where Have You Been?", "Unmailed, Unwritten Letters", "In the Region of Ice", and "Wild Saturday"—have been included in other collections and anthologies. It was a finalist for the 1971 Pulitzer Prize for Fiction.

== Stories ==
The collection features 20 stories, all of which were previously published:

- "In the Region of Ice" (The Atlantic, August 1966)
- "Where Are You Going, Where Have You Been?" (Epoch, Fall 1966)
- "Unmailed, Unwritten Letters" (The Hudson Review, Spring 1969)
- "Shame" (The Atlantic, June 1968)
- "Accomplished Desires" (Esquire, May 1968)
- "Wild Saturday" (Mademoiselle, September 1970)
- "How I Contemplated the World from the Detroit House of Correction and Began My Life Over Again" (TriQuarterly, Spring 1969)
- "The Wheel of Love" (Esquire, October 1967)
- "Four Summers" (The Yale Review, Spring 1967)
- "Demons" (The Southern Review, Winter 1970)
- "Bodies" (Harper's Bazaar, February 1970)
- "Boy and Girl" (Prism International, Spring 1969)
- "Assailant" (Prairie Schooner, Winter 1965–66)
- "The Heavy Sorrow of the Body" (Northwest Review, 1968)
- "Matter and Energy" (Partisan Review, 1969)
- "You" (Cosmopolitan, February 1970)
- "I Was in Love" (Shenandoah, Spring 1970)
- "An Interior Monologue" (Esquire, February 1969)
- "What is the Connection Between Men and Women?" (Mademoiselle, February 1970)

== Reception ==
"Focusing exclusively on the emotional complexity of human relations, Wheel of Love offers a rich—if distressing—view of the mysterious, volatile, and disorienting power of love."—Biographer Joanne V. Creighton in Joyce Carol Oates (1979).

Writing in The New York Times, literary critic Richard Gilman praised Oates for her "clean narrative line," her "almost photographic eye," and "a concern with some central human issues and conditions" dealing with both family and feminist issues. Gilman observes that these stories are "colder and harder" and concern "love's failures."

Gilman reserves special commendation for "Where Are You Going, Where Have You Been?" and "Four Summers," stories which "create a verbal excitement, a sense of language used not for the expression of previously attained insights or perceptions but for new imaginative reality."

== Critical appraisal ==
Margaret Groppi Rozga states that it represents a further development in her fiction in so far as "the characters are now almost always urban, rather than rural, people and are financially established, rather than threatened with poverty." But most important is the further developed consciousness of the characters in The Wheel of Love in comparison to the characters in Oates's first two volumes of short fiction:

What is most noticeable in The Wheel of Love, Oates' third collection of stories, is how much more conscious and self-conscious some of these characters are, or become in the course of their stories. Foremost in their consciousness is a sense of incongruity, an awareness of the contradictions in their lives and in the world around them. Their consciousness is consciousness of pain, of danger, of how little they are what they would be. These characters have no answers to the problems of which they are conscious. But their consciousness gives them more sense of themselves as individuals, separate from but in some ways related to the world around them, and, most important, because they are not so self-absorbed, then, they are not so thoughtless of others, a major change almost unacknowledged in the commentaries on Oates' fiction.

== Sources ==
- Avant, John Alfred. 1970. Library Journal 95. September 1, 1970: 2829.
- Creighton, Joanne V. 1979. Joyce Carol Oates. Warren G. French, editor. Twayne Publishers, a division of G. K. Hall & Company, New York. ISBN 0-8057-7212-X
- Gilman, Richard. 1970. "The Disasters of Love, Sexual and Otherwise." The New York Times, September 25, 1970. Retrieved 5 November 2023
- Johnson, Greg. 1994. Joyce Carol Oates: A Study of the Short Fiction. Twayne's studies in short fiction; no. 57. Twayne Publishers, New York. ISBN 0-8057-0857-X
- Oates, Joyce Carol. 1970. The Wheel of Love. Vanguard Press, New York. ISBN 978-0814906767
