= Stan Ivar =

American actor

- Born: January 11, 1943 (age 83); Brooklyn, New York, U.S.
- Occupation: Actor

Stan Ivar (born January 11, 1943) is an American actor who is best known for his role as John Carter in Little House on the Prairie, and also known for his roles as Ben Robinson in NCIS, Daniel Scott in Days of Our Lives, Mark Johnson in Star Trek: Voyager, and as Captain Mike Davison in the cult movie Creature (1985).

== Career ==
He played blacksmith John Carter in Little House on the Prairie, joining the cast during the final season, and the TV movies Little House: Look Back to Yesterday, Little House: Bless All the Dear Children, and Little House: The Last Farewell.

Once Little House on the Prairie ended, Ivar asked if he could keep the set. Ivar later disassembled the house and moved it out to his home in rural LA County.

Other notable TV roles include Ben Robinson in NCIS, Daniel Scott in Days of Our Lives, Paul Raines in Highway to Heaven, and Mark Johnson in Star Trek: Voyager.

He has also had roles in numerous other major television series, including Grapevine, General Hospital, Crazy Like a Fox, Scarecrow and Mrs. King, Cagney & Lacey, The Practice, St. Elsewhere, The John Larroquette Show, Married with Children, Murder, She Wrote, Beverly Hills, 90210, Beauty and the Beast, Cybill, Matlock, and Moonlighting.

He has appeared in several television movies including The Alamo: Thirteen Days to Glory (1987), Shattered Dreams (1990), The Last Halloween (1991), Torch Song (1993), The Disappearance of Nora (1993), Chance of a Lifetime (1998), and many more.

Feature film roles include Creature (1985), The Big Picture (1989), Rock-A-Doodle (1991), Aspen Extreme (1993), and playing Matt LeBlanc's character's father in Ed (1996).

== Filmography ==
=== Film ===
Year	Title	Role	Notes
1985	Creature	Mike Davison	
1989	The Big Picture	Charlie	
1991	Rock-a-Doodle	Frank - Dad	
1991	Harley Davidson and the Marlboro Man	Jake McAllister	
1993	Aspen Extreme	Mr. Parker	
1996	Ed	Cooper's Father	

=== Television ===
Year	Title	Role	Notes
1982–1983	Little House on the Prairie	John Carter	Recurring role
1983	Little House: Look Back to Yesterday	John Carter	TV movie
1984	Little House: The Last Farewell	John Carter	TV movie
1984	Little House: Bless All the Dear Children	John Carter	TV movie
1984	St. Elsewhere	Don Bundy	Episode: "In Sickness and in Health"
1985	Cagney & Lacey	Steve Hollister	Episode: "Two Grand"
1985	Scarecrow and Mrs. King	Byron Jordan	Episode: "Murder Between Friends"
1987	The Alamo: 13 Days to Glory	Doc Sutherland	Television film
1987	Simon & Simon	Police Sgt. Michael Gray	Episode: "Judgement Call"
1987	My Sister Sam	Eric Randall	Episode: "Another Saturday Night"
1987	1st & Ten	Coach Dowling	Episode: "A Second Chance Once Removed"
1987	Highway to Heaven	Paul Raines	2 episodes
1987	It's Garry Shandling's Show	Donald Rapaport	Episode: "Who's Poppa?"
1987	The Oldest Rookie	Arthur White	Episode: "Grand Theft Avocado"
1988	Matlock	Congressman Pete McGuiness	Episode: "The Investigation: Part 1"
1988	Beauty and the Beast	Jonathan Thorpe	Episode: "Fever"
1988	Moonlighting	Brian Gates	Episode: "And the Flesh Was Made Word"
1988	The Bronx Zoo	Jeffrey Warren	3 episodes
1988	The Bold and the Beautiful	Dr. Lerner	Episode #1.354
1988	Amen	Detective	Episode: "Look at Me, I'm Running"
1988	Hunter	Dan Michaels	Episode: "The Baby Game"
1988	Take My Daughters, Please	James	TV movie
1989	She's the Sheriff	Michael Davenport	Episode: "Max Gets Trumped"
1989	Hard Time on Planet Earth	Remy	Episode: "Jesse's Fifteen Minutes"
1990	CBS Schoolbreak Special	Mr. McCallister	Episode: "The Girl with the Crazy Brother"
1990	Jake and the Fatman	Jim Clarke	Episode: "I Ain't Got No Body"
1990	Mancuso, F.B.I.	Farber	Episode: "Adamant Eve"
1990	Shattered Dreams	Bryan Renehan	TV movie
1990	She Said No	Doug	TV movie
1990	Who's the Boss?	Peter Gerber	2 episodes
1990	The Flash	Dr. Carl Tanner	Episode: "Out of Control"
1990	Beverly Hills, 90210	Glen Evans	Episode: "The 17 Year Itch"
1990	Coach	David	Episode: "Men Don't Heal"
1991	The Killing Mind	Captain Harris	TV movie
1991	Midnight Caller	Dallas Castleman	Episode: "City of Lost Souls: Part 2"
1991	The Last Halloween	Hubble	TV movie
1992	Grapevine	Henry	Episode: "The Janice and Brian Story"
1992	A House of Secrets and Lies	Ben Rudolph	TV movie
1993	The Disappearance of Nora	Leland Sinclair	TV movie
1993	Torch Song	Ken	TV movie
1993	River of Rage: The Taking of Maggie Keene	Bob Keene	TV movie
1993	The Secrets of Lake Success	Tucker Reed	3 episodes
1994	Silk Stalkings	Clifford Jameson	Episode: "Maid Service"
1994	Married... with Children	Jack Franklin	Episode: "Dud Bowl"
1994–1996	Days of Our Lives	Daniel Scott	60 episodes
1995	The John Larroquette Show	David McKenna	Episode: "Rachel and Tony"
1995	Star Trek: Voyager	Mark Johnson	4 episodes
1995	Murder, She Wrote	Lou the Lawyer	Episode: "Unwilling Witness"
1996	Murder One	Assemblyman Galloway	Episode: "Chapter Sixteen"
1996	Malibu Shores	Mr. Green	Episode: "The Competitive Edge"
1997	Home Invasion	Dr. Alan Patchett	TV movie
1997	Step by Step	Kevin McGowan	Episode: "Can't Buy Me Love"
1997	Ally McBeal	Jason Hatfield	Episode: "Drawing the Lines"
1998	Chance of a Lifetime	Ivan	TV movie
1998	Cybill	Jonathan Martin Jr.	Episode: "Oh Brother!"
1998	Just Shoot Me!	Roger	Episode: "War & Sleaze"
1998	The Young and the Restless	Chief Firemarshall	2 episodes
2000 & 2004	The Practice	Judge Harvey Gleason / Mark Jacobs	3 episodes
2010	NCI	Ben Robinson	2 episodes
