= Verde Valley School =

Location
- 3511 Verde Valley School Road; Sedona, Arizona 86351; United States; 34°48′19″N 111°48′21″W

Information
- Type: Private, boarding
- Established: 1948 (78 years ago)
- CEEB code: 030410
- Head of school: Catherine Massar
- Teaching staff: 26.9 (on an FTE basis)
- Enrollment: 106 (2023-2024)
- Student to teacher ratio: 5.2
- Colors: Green and white
- Mascot: Coyotes
- Website: www.vvsaz.org

Verde Valley School (VVS) is an international college preparatory boarding and day school for students in grades 9-12. The school is located in Sedona, Arizona, United States.

== History ==
Founded by Hamilton and Barbara Warren, Verde Valley School opened its doors to its first class of students in 1948. Mr. Warren, who had served as liaison officer for the European policy section of the Office of War Information during World War II, was motivated to create a space where people of different cultures and backgrounds could come together to learn. Verde Valley School curriculum was designed with the intention to promote international and intercultural understanding, requiring its 120 students to take courses in anthropology and Spanish and annual field trips to Mexico and nearby Indian reservations. Scholars who helped found the school and guide its early years included Harvard anthropologist Clyde Kluckhohn (who mentored Hamilton while at Harvard), anthropologist Margaret Mead, and John Collier, Commissioner of Indian Affairs during the Franklin Roosevelt administration. The establishment of the school coincided with a post-war growth in Sedona, including the growth of the arts in the region.

== Notable alumni ==
- James Horner, Oscar-winning composer of the Titanic film score.
- Chris Lemmon, Class of 1972, actor.
- Anne Lockhart, actress.
- Benson K. Whitney, Class of 1974, United States Ambassador to Norway under Presidents Bush and Obama.
- Andre R. Guttfreund, Class of 1964, an Oscar winning Salvadoran film director, producer and filmmaker.
