= Femme Fatale (1991 film) =

- Directed by: Andre R. Guttfreund
- Written by: John Brancato; Michael Ferris
- Produced by: Nancy Rae Stone; Andrew Lane
- Starring: Colin Firth; Billy Zane; Scott Wilson
- Cinematography: Joey Forsyte
- Edited by: Richard Candib
- Music by: Parmer Fuller
- Production company: Gibraltar Entertainment
- Distributed by: Republic Pictures
- Release date: May 23, 1991 (USA)
- Running time: 94 minutes
- Country: USA
- Language: English

Femme Fatale is a 1991 American drama film, directed by Andre R. Guttfreund.

== Cast ==
- Billy Zane as Elijah
- Lisa Zane as Cynthia
- Colin Firth as Joseph Prince
- Scott Wilson as Dr. Beaumont
- Suzanne Snyder as Andrea
- Pat Skipper as Ted
- John Lavachielli as Ed
- Lisa Blount as Jenny Purge
- Carmine Caridi as Dino
- Danny Trejo as Toshi
- Catherine E. Coulson as Sister Mary
- Tommy Morgan as Louis
- Roberto Luis Santana as Artist
