= I Was in Love =

Short story by Joyce Carol Oates

- Short story by Joyce Carol Oates
- Country: United States
- Language: English

Publication
- Published in: Shenandoah
- Publication date: Spring 1970

"I Was in Love" is a short story by Joyce Carol Oates originally published in Shenandoah (Spring 1970), and first collected in The Wheel of Love (1970) by Vanguard Press.

== Plot ==
The story is written from a first-person confessional point-of-view.

The narrator is an unnamed young woman, married with a young son, Bobby. She is having an affair with a local man who is single and lives alone. Awake in bed at night. she compulsively reflects upon the relationship and despairs: "I was in love with a man I couldn't marry so one of us had to die...I lay awake trying to understand which of us should die, he or I."

Her son seems to her to be physically abnormal, though her doctor assures her otherwise. She is obsessed with his eating habits and fears he is malnourished and buys raw vegetables. Bobby acts out against his mother, and she suspects the he throws away the food she puts in his school lunch. She agonizes over a number of accidents or abductions at Bobby's school. She laments that her lover is unconcerned about these incidents, and she feels compelled to worry in his stead. Her thoughts are filled with scenarios of catastrophes.

Her efforts to enjoy a tryst with her lover is thwarted by a house guest, a male acquaintance named Randolph, who is hitchhiking across the country, but has been too ill continue his trip. The couple engage in recriminations over the relationship, satisfactory to neither, and yet they pledge their love for one another. When Randolph goes for a walk, the couple have sex. She departs feeling elated: "Nothing has been decided, I thought. Why was I happy?"

She picks up Bobby after school to take him to a doctor's appointment. Her son is alternately remote and surly. He senses that his mother has just been with her lover, and begins to kick at the floorboard. His mother reprimands him, and her son tells her to shut up. Shocked, she slaps him in the face, causing his head to strike the window. The car is speeding at 40-miles-per-hour. He convulses in a wild tantrum, opens the passenger door, and leaps from the vehicle. The mother crashes into another vehicle, and she emerges from the car bleeding and looking for her son.

== Retrospective appraisal ==
Oates opens the story with a sentence one would typically find on covers of tabloids or confession magazines: "I was in love with a man I couldn't marry, so one of us had to die." The narrator, contemplating suicide thinks "I want to cut up my body, I can't live in this body," further taps into the pulp-fiction genre.

Literary critic Greg Johnson detects "a chortling, perversely gratified tone" in these and other phrases that resonate with the last poems of Sylvia Plath.

The narrator's vampire-like compulsion is exposed when her male lover becomes physically ill during an excruciating tête-à-tête: "A curiosity was stirred in me: I could make a man sick...I wanted suddenly, thirstfully, to drain the blood out of this man and be finished with him; then I could drive back home." Johnson further notes Oates's use of blood as a metaphoric emblem for the savagery of love:

[O]ates's imagery in "I Was in Love"...suggests the central symbol of blood, the life force itself, and points to her ironic vision of romantic love as masking primitive, violent urges, essential to nature, but inimical to her characters' emotional and spiritual needs.

Biographer Joanne V. Creighton describes the story as "an exquisitely tedious account of the state of high tension, guilt, and suppressed hysteria of a woman who is having an adulterous affair." The protagonist's young son, distraught over his mother's extramarital affair - and her relishment in its pleasure - leads to his impulsive suicide. This narrative device is "contrived" according to Creighton, and fails to provide the reader with a satisfactory understanding of the source the woman's suffering.

Oates has failed to give her story a meaningful shape. Like the woman herself, the reader achieves no perspective on her situation; there's no illumination, no epiphany, no climax beyond the contrived death of her son.

Creighton adds that "I Was in Love" fails to "display Oates's craftsmanship at its best."
