= About Time (play) =

About Time is a theatrical play written by playwright Tom Cole that debuted in 1990 Off Broadway at the John Houseman Theater. This two-character play featured an elderly couple, identified only as Old Man and Old Woman, chatting and arguing about matters around the subject of death. Directed by Tony Giordano, the play original production starred James Whitmore and Audra Lindley, described in a Mel Gussow review as an "endearing couple" who "act their way through and around the slight play that Tom Cole has created for them". Lindley and Whitmore had been married to each other and divorced in 1979, yet continued to perform with each other on stage.

The play presents four short scenes, titled "Breakfast", "Lunch", "Supper" and "Late Snack", with the play traditionally having an intermission between the second and third sets. Almost of the play revolves around food and meals, its preparation and consumption, set in the kitchen of their condo. The set, designed by Kent Dorsey, included a fully functional kitchen. The Old Woman laments how her advancing age has increased the amount of time she requires to prepare meals for Old Man's demanding appetite, including his favorite dish of chopped vegetables with sour cream, while her need for food has only diminished.

The couple talks about their past, providing some limited insights into the characters, with the Old Man describing how he operated a successful business but regrets not doing more to have helped the needy, though the play provides little about Old Woman and her past or the steps that led her to taking a subservient role in their marriage to her husband. The second-most discussed issue behind food is sex, with Gussow describing in his review how Old Woman believes "that nymphomania may be her mania of choice".

Gussow credited the director and cast for performing beyond the play's flaws, noting how Whitmore was able to play a "foxy pretender" even with his face hidden behind a newspaper, while Lindley combined humor and sweetness in her performance.

The play had been produced at the George Street Playhouse in New Brunswick, New Jersey in February 1990 under the title The Eighties, directed by Gregory S. Hurst with the same cast as Off-Broadway. An earlier version was produced in March 1983 at the Milwaukee Repertory Theater in Milwaukee, Wisconsin under The Eighties, or Last Love, with Megan Hunt and Emmett O'Sullivan Moore in the two roles.
