= Charles Schmid =

American serial killer (1942–1975)

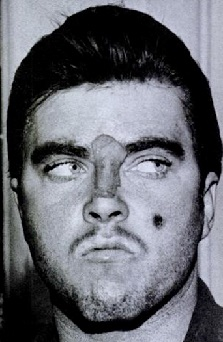
- Schmid in 1965
- Born: Charles Howard Schmid Jr. July 8, 1942; Tucson, Arizona, U.S.
- Died: March 30, 1975 (aged 32); Florence, Arizona, U.S.
- Cause of death: Stab wounds
- Other names: The Pied Piper of Tucson; Smitty
- Convictions: First-degree murder (2 counts); Second-degree murder
- Penalty: Death; commuted to life imprisonment

Details
- Victims: 3, maybe 4
- Span of crimes: 1964–1965
- Country: United States
- State: Arizona
- Date apprehended: November 10, 1965

Charles Howard Schmid Jr. (July 8, 1942 – March 30, 1975), also known as the Pied Piper of Tucson, was an American serial killer whose crimes were detailed by journalist Don Moser in an article featured in the March 4, 1966, issue of Life magazine. Schmid's criminal career later formed the basis for "Where Are You Going, Where Have You Been?", a short story by Joyce Carol Oates. In 2008, The Library of America selected Moser's article for inclusion in its two-century retrospective of American true crime literature.

== Early life ==
Charles Schmid was born to a single mother; he was adopted by Charles and Katharine Schmid, owners and operators of Hillcrest Nursing Home in Tucson, Arizona. He had a difficult relationship with his adoptive father, whom his adoptive mother later divorced. When Schmid tried to meet his birth mother, she angrily told him never to come back.

Schmid did poorly in school, but was described as good-looking, intelligent and well-mannered. An accomplished athlete, he excelled at gymnastics and even led his high school to a state championship, but quit the team in his senior year. Just before graduating, Schmid was suspended for stealing tools from the school's machine shop; he never returned to school.

Schmid began living in his own quarters on his parents' property and received an allowance of $300 a month. His parents left him to run on his own with a new car and a motorcycle.

Schmid was called the "Pied Piper" because he was charismatic and had many friends in Tucson's teenaged community. For a time, the members of his teenage coterie would keep the secrets of his murders. His best friends were John Saunders, Richie Bruns, and Paul Graff, the latter of whom lived with him. He spent part of his time on Tucson's Speedway Boulevard, picking up girls and drinking with friends, although he tended to be a loner.

Schmid was a short man who wore cowboy boots stuffed with newspapers and flattened cans to make him appear taller; he explained to impressionable teenagers his resultant rolling gait was a result of a "crippling fight" with Mafia members. He used lip balm, pancake makeup and created an artificial mole on his cheek. Schmid also stretched his lower lip with a clothespin to make it resemble Elvis Presley's.

== Murders ==
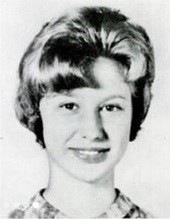
Alleen Rowe

=== Alleen Rowe ===
On the evening of May 31, 1964, Schmid—in the presence of his then-girlfriend and an acquaintance—blurted a statement: "I want to kill a girl tonight!" The trio drove to the home of Alleen Rowe, a high school student living with her divorced mother, whom Schmid knew worked nights. It is believed Schmid selected Rowe to be his victim as the teen had refused to engage in casual sex with Schmid and other local youths.

Schmid instructed his girlfriend, Mary French, to persuade Rowe to accompany her, Schmid, and John Saunders to the desert. The teenager agreed, although shortly after arriving at the desert, Schmid bound the teen's arms behind her back as Rowe pleaded, "Why are you doing this to me?" to which Schmid responded: "It's Mary French's idea. She hates you." Saunders then removed Rowe's bathing costume before Schmid informed him to "take a walk".

Upon Saunders' return, he observed Rowe—having been raped in his absence—meekly attempting to redress herself. Schmid instructed Saunders to likewise rape the teen, but Saunders was unable to sustain an erection. Saunders reportedly then refused Schmid's instructions to bludgeon Rowe with a large rock—instead returning to Schmid's car to retrieve French, who had remained in the vehicle listening to the radio. Schmid then bludgeoned Rowe to death in the others' absence.

Schmid then returned to the car, where he kissed French, telling the girl, "Remember, I love you." The three then buried her.

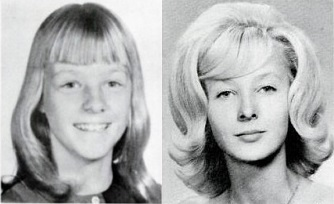
Wendy (left) and Gretchen Fritz

=== Fritz sisters ===
Several months after the murder of Alleen Rowe, Schmid encountered a 16-year-old local teen named Gretchen Fritz at a local swimming pool. Fritz was the daughter of a wealthy, prominent Tucson heart surgeon and community leader, and via local gossip, Schmid had learned the girl had recently been expelled from her private school due to her involvement in an attempted armed robbery. Unknown to Schmid, tutors at Fritz's private school had classified her as a pathological liar whom they had recommended undergo psychiatric treatment.

That evening, Schmid drove to Fritz's home, where he presented himself as a pots and pans salesman as a ruse to introduce himself to her. According to Schmid, Fritz scrutinized the cutlery in his hands and then said "They look like they've all been used." She then smiled and calmly offered to buy his wares, but when Schmid explained the cutlery in his possession were "just samples", Fritz shrieked "I want them! All of them!" When he revealed the true reason for his visit, the teen calmed down. Shortly thereafter, the two began dating, but Fritz was markedly possessive and frequently became hysterical if she observed Schmid in the company of other females or learned of parties he hosted to which she was not invited. According to Schmid, by 1965, Fritz frequently called him "five or six times a day", and he began making efforts to distance himself from her.

Several months into their relationship, Schmid confided to Fritz that he had murdered Rowe; he later showed her the location of the grave in an effort to "show her what kind of guy I am", but Fritz—who had stolen a diary from Schmid in which he had detailed the murder of Rowe plus the alleged shooting death of a 16-year-old boy—had openly threatened to "ruin" Schmid if he attempted to separate from her. When he resolved to permanently end it with Fritz, she again threatened to use the information against him. Schmid strangled Gretchen (then aged 17) and her 13-year-old sister Wendy on August 16, 1965.

Schmid confided to his friend Richard Bruns that he murdered the sisters and showed him the bodies, buried haphazardly in the desert. Bruns became increasingly afraid that Schmid was going to murder his girlfriend. Ultimately, Bruns fled to Ohio because his girlfriend's parents were convinced that he was harassing her. Bruns stayed with his grandparents and told them everything he knew about the murders and flew back to Tucson to help with the investigation.

== Trial ==
The mid-1960s media focused their attention on the Schmid case and trial. Life and Playboy magazines sent reporters to cover the proceedings. Time did features on contemporary life in Tucson and the murders of the young women. F. Lee Bailey, a celebrity attorney who was involved with the Boston Strangler and Sam Sheppard cases of the 1950s and 1960s, was brought in for consultation.

In 1966, Schmid was found guilty of murder and sentenced to death. After capital punishment nationwide was temporarily ruled unconstitutional under Furman v. Georgia in 1972, his sentence was commuted to 50 years in prison. After Schmid's trial and conviction, his adoptive mother and her second husband had owed her son's legal team more money than they possessed. As a result, they ended up living in near poverty in Coolidge, Arizona.

== After incarceration ==
Schmid attempted to escape from prison multiple times, finally succeeding on November 11, 1972, when he and triple murderer Raymond Hudgens escaped from Arizona State Prison. They held four hostages on a ranch near Tempe for a time, ate at a Sonic, then separated, and were recaptured and returned to prison.

In the early 1970s, Schmid became interested in poetry. He sent his work from prison to Richard Shelton, a professor at the University of Arizona. "For all the wrong reasons, I critiqued his work and discovered that he was quite talented," Shelton later said.

== Death ==
On March 20, 1975, Schmid was stabbed 47 times by two fellow prisoners. After losing an eye and a kidney, he died from his injuries on March 30, 1975. His body was stolen from the morgue but recovered by police. Schmid's mother chose the prison cemetery for his burial, believing his tombstone would be defaced if he were buried in a public cemetery. He received a Catholic funeral at the prison, but his body was not in the casket during the service. The two prisoners who killed him were Jimmy Ferra and Dennis Eversole, both of whom pleaded guilty to second-degree murder for Schmid's death and received additional time in prison. Ferra was originally sent to prison for an unrelated murder while Eversole was serving time for multiple armed robberies.

== Books and media ==
In 1966, Joyce Carol Oates published the short story "Where Are You Going, Where Have You Been?", about a teenage girl being charmed and menaced by a predatory man; she was inspired in part by the Schmid case. The story is dedicated to Bob Dylan because Oates was inspired by his song "It's All Over Now, Baby Blue." The story was adapted into the 1985 film Smooth Talk, and the character based on Schmid is played by Treat Williams.

In 1970 John Gilmore published The Tucson Murders through Dial Press, detailing the life and crimes of Charles Schmid, the "notorious pied piper of Tucson". John Gilmore was sent at first by Playboy magazine to do a story on the trial, but after an introduction to Schmid's wife, he managed to meet Charles Schmid and get the exclusive rights to a book. He was in close contact with him and his family during the trial.

The 1971 movie The Todd Killings is based on the Schmid case, as was the 1994 film Dead Beat and the 2005 film The Lost, adapted from a novel by Jack Ketchum.

Actress Rose McGowan's 2014 directorial debut Dawn was inspired by the events surrounding the murder of Alleen Rowe. It stars Tara Lynne Barr in the role of Dawn Rowe, Hannah Marks as Mary French and Reiley McClendon as Schmid.

The young adult thriller Half in Love with Death (Merit Press 2015) by Emily Ross was inspired by the Schmid case.

A Crime to Remember portrayed the case in the 2014 episode "The Pied Piper".

I, a Squealer: The Insider's Account of the "Pied Piper of Tucson" Murders by Richard Bruns is a first-hand account of the murders by Schmid's childhood friend whose information resulted in Schmid's arrest and conviction.

== See also ==
- List of serial killers in the United States
