= Pastoral Blood =

Short story by Joyce Carol Oates

- Short story by Joyce Carol Oates
- Country: United States
- Language: English

Publication
- Published in: By the North Gate
- Publisher: Vanguard Press
- Publication date: 1963

"Pastoral Blood" is a short story by Joyce Carol Oates. The story was first collected in By the North Gate (1963) by Vanguard Press.

The story is set, as are other works in By the North Gate, in Oates's fictional "Eden County", similar to the rural upstate New York community where she was raised.

== Plot ==
"Pastoral Blood" is written in the third-person omniscient point of view, with Grace, a young woman, as the focal character.

Grace is seated at her vanity table and suddenly realizes "she no longer cared to live." Aged 19 or 20, she enjoys the privileges and possessions of the upper-middle class. In appearance, Grace is strikingly attractive. She is inured to the male gaze. Her wedding to Tom, a tall, handsome, and complacent boy of her social class, is a week away. Unlike his fraternity brothers and their girlfriends, Grace has only kissed Tom and never felt deeply stirred sexually. Their relationship lacks genuine intimacy. She sports his engagement gift, a huge diamond ring. She has no intention of marrying him. At home, Grace's relationship with her mother and her younger brother remains that of a petulant tween.

Grace proceeds to withdraw all her $1000 money from her bank account in $10 bills and stuffs them in her purse. As she strolls downtown, she pauses to look at luxury items in a display window. A mechanical manakin representing a beautiful girl is on display. Grace feels that she and the mechanism recognize each other: "How strange that she should be the last to see me alive!" Grace muses. She buys a cheap outfit at a discount mart and abandons her expensive clothing in the dressing room, driving off in her late-model automobile. Grace feels only mild regret that she has not said her final goodbye to her mother and Tom.

She stops at a cheap diner for a cup of coffee and has an impersonal exchange with a male customer. He appears to be about 35 years old. She reencounters him walking down the street and offers him a ride. The man is dismayed at the offer, but gets in. They stop at a roadhouse for beers. The man is perplexed and wishes to establish whether or not she is in trouble or being pursued. Satisfied she is not, he begins to warm to the possibilities of the situation. Grace divulges that she is carrying a thousand dollars in cash. Slightly intoxicated from the beer, she becomes indifferent to the unfolding events. Grace is experiencing utter disaffection from life, past and present. When the man takes the car keys, she submits. Grace remembers her early success in high school writing courses, but decides they were quite pointless. She recollects these lines of early English verse:

The hawk had naw lure, and the horse had nae master
And the faithless hounds thro the woods ran faster.

The man parks the car off a secluded side road and rapes her. She retches after the assault, but remains void of any emotion. Grace takes the wheel herself and continues on her quest. She picks up three young men and begins to lose control mentally, crashing the car into a sign near a river-front slum. The occupants of the car pile out and flee from the accident. Grace's perceptions now resemble a phantasmagoria. She enters a saloon with the boys. The establishment is filled with sailors who leer at Grace. She is led upstairs. Chaos ensues.

Grace regains consciousness in a hospital room sometime later. She sees an image in the mirror of an attractive woman; it is she. Her mother, fiancée Tom, and her brother arrive. The gathering is uncomfortable for them; they completely misapprehend the cause of what they feel is Grace's disgrace.

Grace "rejects, flatly, the ease of insanity- bloodless suicide, suicide for cowards." She assures herself that she will ultimately be successful in her endeavor to be free.

== Theme ==
"Pastoral Blood" marks the first appearance of Oates's "specifically female terror" that would become a central theme in her fiction. Literary critic Greg Johnson writes:

Oates's women in By the North Gate can succumb to their sense of terror and vulnerability through the trance-like resignation assumed by Grace after her doomed bid for freedom...

Johnson adds that "Pastoral Blood" is representative of the author's fiction dramatizing the social and biological factors that "distort and inhibit the healthy development of autonomy and personality in her female characters." This "feminist allegory" is unique among the stories in the volume in that the protagonist is a member of the upper-middle class which itself contributes to her emotional disaffection.

== Sources ==
- Johnson, Greg. 1994. Joyce Carol Oates: A Study of the Short Fiction. Twayne's studies in short fiction; no. 57. Twayne Publishers, New York. ISBN 0-8057-0857-X
- Oates, Joyce Carol. 1963. By the North Gate. Vanguard Press, New York. Library of Congress Catalog Card Number: 63-13790
