= Blood Simple =

1984 film by Joel and Ethan Coen

- Theatrical release poster
- Directed by: Joel Coen (Note: Although the Coen brothers co-directed this film, Joel received sole credit due to Directors Guild of America regulations)
- Written by: Joel Coen; Ethan Coen
- Produced by: Ethan Coen (Note: Although the Coen brothers both produced this film, Ethan received sole credit due to Directors Guild of America regulations)
- Starring: John Getz; Frances McDormand; Dan Hedaya; Samm-Art Williams; M. Emmet Walsh
- Cinematography: Barry Sonnenfeld
- Edited by: Roderick Jaynes (Note: Roderick Jaynes is the shared pseudonym used by the Coen brothers for their editing.); Don Wiegmann
- Music by: Carter Burwell
- Production companies: River Road Productions; Foxton Entertainment
- Distributed by: Circle Films
- Release dates: October 12, 1984 (New York Film Festival); January 18, 1985 (United States)
- Running time: 96 minutes
- Country: United States
- Language: English
- Budget: $1.5 million
- Box office: $4.3 million

Blood Simple is a 1984 American independent neo-noir crime film written, edited, produced and directed by Joel and Ethan Coen, and starring John Getz, Frances McDormand, Dan Hedaya and M. Emmet Walsh. Its plot follows a Texas bartender who is having an affair with his boss's wife. When his boss discovers the affair, he hires a private investigator to kill the couple. It was the directorial debut of the Coens and the first major film of cinematographer Barry Sonnenfeld, who later became a director, as well as the feature-film debut of McDormand.

The film's title is derived from Dashiell Hammett's novel Red Harvest (1929), in which the Continental Op muses, "This damned burg's getting me. If I don't get away soon I'll be going blood-simple like the natives." Stylistically, the film has been noted for its blending elements of neo-noir, pulp crime stories and low-budget horror films. In 2001, a director's cut was released, the same year that it was ranked No. 98 on AFI's 100 Years...100 Thrills.

== Plot ==
Texas bartender Ray and housewife Abby drive through a downpour at night, discussing Abby's bad marriage to Ray's boss, Julian Marty. They have sex at a motel. Loren Visser, a private detective, takes photos of the tryst and delivers them to Marty. When a caller informs the couple they are being watched, Abby grabs some belongings, including a revolver Marty gave her. Ray goes to the bar to demand his back pay from Marty, who tells Ray that Abby will betray him, as she did Marty, and when confronted will say, "I haven't done anything funny."

After a botched attempt to kidnap Abby, Marty offers Visser $10,000 to kill her and Ray. Visser tells Marty to go fishing and he will call him when the job is done. Visser breaks into Ray's home and steals Abby's gun. He shows Marty photos of the murdered couple, one of which Marty secretes in his safe while retrieving the $10,000. Visser double crosses Marty and shoots him with Abby's gun. He drops the gun and grabs the money but forgets his cigarette lighter as he leaves.

It is revealed that Visser doctored the photos to appear that Abby and Ray had been shot. Ray discovers Marty's body, accidentally discharging Abby's gun when he steps on it. Convinced that Abby shot Marty, Ray cleans the crime scene, puts the gun in Marty's pocket and the body in his car. Marty is still alive, albeit barely; he attempts to crawl away, laboriously, as Ray is preparing to bury him, but Ray recovers him. Ray begins to bury Marty in a shallow grave when Marty pulls the gun out of his pocket, aims, and pulls the trigger three times, falling on an empty chamber each time. Marty screams as Ray takes the gun and finishes burying him alive.

The next morning, Ray tries to explain to Abby that he "cleaned it all up." Abby says, "I haven't done anything funny," which leads to an argument. Visser telephones but does not speak when Abby picks up. Unaware of Marty's death and Ray's "cleanup", Abby assumes and tells Ray that it was Marty. Ray places her gun on a table as he leaves. Meurice, another bartender, tells Ray about a phone message Marty left regarding money stolen from the safe—Marty's cover for the $10,000 he paid Visser.

While burning the doctored photos, Visser realizes that Marty kept one, and that he left his lighter. His attempt to break into the safe is thwarted by Abby, who thinks Ray damaged the safe and realizes Marty might be dead. She has a nightmare of Marty warning her that Ray will kill her as well. She confronts Ray, who tells her Marty was still alive when he buried him.

After opening the safe and discovering the doctored photo, Ray goes to Abby's apartment to warn her. Visser kills Ray with a rifle shot from a rooftop across the street. Smashing the light bulb to darken the room, Abby hides in the bathroom.

Visser enters the apartment and searches for the lighter, finding that Abby has climbed out of the window into the next apartment. As Visser attempts to crawl through in pursuit, Abby stabs his hand with Ray's knife, pinning the hand to the sill of the window he tried to reach while his body remains trapped in the other room. As Abby backs away, Visser empties his gun into the wall partitioning the two in rooms, then punches through it to remove the knife. Returning to her apartment, Abby picks up her gun and shoots Visser through the bathroom door. She says, "I'm not afraid of you, Marty," and Visser, lying wounded, laughs and responds, "Well, ma'am, if I see him, I'll sure give him the message."

== Cast ==
- John Getz as Ray
- Frances McDormand as Abby
- Dan Hedaya as Julian Marty
- M. Emmet Walsh as Loren Visser, Private Detective
- Samm-Art Williams as Meurice
- Deborah Neumann as Debra
- Holly Hunter as Hélène Trend (voice, uncredited)

== Production ==
=== Development ===
After writing the screenplay, the Coen brothers shot a preemptive dummy theatrical trailer for Blood Simple, which showed "a man dragging a shovel alongside a car stopped in the middle of the road, back towards another man he was going to kill" and "a shot of backlit gun holes in a wall." The trailer featured actor Bruce Campbell, playing the Julian Marty role, and was shot by recent film school graduate Barry Sonnenfeld.

After completing the trailer, the Coens began exhibiting it with the hope of persuading investors to help fund a full-length feature film. Daniel Bacaner was one of the first people to invest money in the project. He also became its executive producer and introduced the Coens to other potential backers. The entire process of raising the necessary $1.5 million took a year.

=== Filming ===
Blood Simple was shot in several locations in the towns of Austin and Hutto, Texas, over a period of eight weeks in the fall of 1982. The film spent a year in postproduction and was completed by 1984.

Blood Simple was Frances McDormand's screen debut. All Coen brothers films are co-produced and co-directed by Joel and Ethan Coen, although Ethan was credited as the sole producer and Joel the sole director until 2004. The Coens share editing credit under the pseudonym Roderick Jaynes.

== Reception and legacy ==
=== Critical response ===
On the review aggregator website Rotten Tomatoes, 94% of 116 critics' reviews are positive. The website's consensus reads: "Brutally violent and shockingly funny in equal measure, Blood Simple offers early evidence of the Coen Brothers' twisted sensibilities and filmmaking ingenuity." Metacritic, which uses a weighted average, assigned the film a score of 84 out of 100, based on 33 critics, indicating "universal acclaim".

Janet Maslin wrote: "Black humor, abundant originality and a brilliant visual style make Joel Coen's Blood Simple a directorial debut of extraordinary promise. Mr. Coen, who co-wrote the film with his brother Ethan, works in a film noir style that in no way inhibits his wit, which turns out to be considerable." She cites a "long, late-night tracking shot from one end of the Neon Boot bar to another actually tracks along the surface of the bar itself—and when there is a drunk passed out on the bar, the camera simply lifts up and flies over him, then continues on its route."

Pauline Kael called it "a crude, ghoulish story with thriller themes," but was effusive about the performance of M. Emmet Walsh as Visser. Gene Siskel and Roger Ebert each gave it a positive review on At the Movies. In his four-star review for the Chicago Sun-Times, Ebert wrote: "A lot has been written about the visual style of Blood Simple, but I think the appeal of the movie is more elementary. It keys into three common nightmares: (1) You clean and clean, but there's still blood all over the place; (2) You know you have committed a murder, but you are not sure quite how or why; (3) You know you have forgotten a small detail that will eventually get you into a lot of trouble."

=== Box office ===
The film grossed $2.7 million worldwide from its initial run, and a total of $4.3 million after subsequent re-releases. Its first big public viewing was the USA Film Festival in Dallas, followed by the Sundance Film Festival, where it received the Grand Jury Prize. The brothers took the film to the Toronto Film Festival, the Cannes Film Festival, and the New York Film Festival. They were very proud of their film, particularly in light of having raised the funds using their self-made trailer.

=== Accolades ===
- Sundance Film Festival – Grand Jury Prize: U.S. Dramatic (1985)
- 1st Independent Spirit Awards – Best Director (tied with Martin Scorsese for After Hours) and Best Actor (M. Emmet Walsh)

In The Atlantic, Christopher Orr writes: "It all began here, and not merely for the Coens themselves. Blood Simple was the first feature starring Joel Coen's soon-to-become wife, Frances McDormand; the first scored by Carter Burwell, who’s collaborated—often, as here, magnificently—with the Coens on all their subsequent scores; and the first shot by cinematographer Barry Sonnenfeld, who also worked on the Coens' next two films before embarking on his own directorial career ... It is no small miracle—and a testament to the Coens themselves—that so many exceptional talents connected so early in their respective careers."

== Home media ==
The original MCA Home Video VHS tape and LaserDisc was released on October 10, 1985, with a 96-minute running time. The film was released on Universal Pictures Home Entertainment VHS for a second time in 1995 with a 99-minute run time. Unusual for such an exercise, the "Director's Cut" is some three minutes shorter than the original 1985 theatrical release. The Coens reduced the run time with tighter editing, shortening some shots and removing others altogether. Additionally, they resolved long-standing rights issues with the music; the original theatrical version of the film made prominent use of The Four Tops' "It's the Same Old Song" (1965); the Coens had replaced it with Neil Diamond's "I'm a Believer" (1966) for the 1995 U.S. home video edition on VHS. The Director's Cut reinstated the Four Tops track.

Universal Home Video released a DVD version of the film in 2001, and again in 2005 as part of a DVD box set titled The Coen Brothers Collection. A Blu-ray edition was released in 2011 by 20th Century Fox Home Entertainment.

In 2016, The Criterion Collection released the film on Blu-ray and DVD, featuring a new 4K digital transfer supervised and approved by Barry Sonnenfeld and the Coens, along with various new special features. In 2024, The Criterion Collection released the film on 4K Ultra HD for the first time as a combo pack which includes the 2016 Blu-ray disc as well.

== Soundtrack ==
Original Motion Picture Soundtracks: Raising Arizona and Blood Simple

Soundtrack album by Carter Burwell
- Released: 1987
- Genre: Film score
- Length: 39:26
- Label: Varèse Sarabande

Professional ratings
Review scores
Source	Rating
AllMusic	4.5/5 stars

Carter Burwell wrote the film's score, the first of his collaborations with the Coen brothers. Blood Simple was also the first feature-film score for Burwell, and after his work on this film, he became a much-in-demand composer in Hollywood. As of 2024, he had scored sixteen of the Coen brothers' films.

The score for Blood Simple is a mix of solo piano and electronic ambient sounds. One track, "Monkey Chant", is based on kecak, the "Ramayana Monkey Chant" of Bali.

In 1987, seven selections from Burwell's Blood Simple score were released on a 17-track album that also features selections from the soundtrack of the Coens' next film, Raising Arizona (1987).

Blood Simple selections on the 1987 album:

1. "Crash and Burn" (2:40)
2. "Blood Simple" (3:33)
3. "Chain Gang" (4:47)
4. "The March" (3:34)
5. "Monkey Chant" (1:04)
6. "The Shooting" (2:52)
7. "Blood Simpler" (1:22)

Other songs from the film that are not on the album:

- "It's the Same Old Song", written by Eddie Holland, Lamont Dozier and Brian Holland and performed by the Four Tops (used three different times, two for scenes inside the bar and one under the end credits)
- "Louie Louie", written by Richard Berry and performed by Toots & the Maytals
- "The Lady in Red", written by M. Dixon and A. Wrubel and performed by Xavier Cugat and his Orchestra
- "Rogaciano", courtesy of Monitor Records
- "He'll Have to Go", written by Joe Allison and Audrey Allison, arranged by Jim Roberge, and performed by Joan Black
- "El Sueno", written by Camilo Namen and performed by Johnny Ventura y su Combo
- "Anahi", performed by Maria Luisa Buchino and her Llameros
- "Sweet Dreams", written by Don Gibson and performed by Patsy Cline

== See also ==
- A Simple Noodle Story, a 2009 Chinese language remake directed by Zhang Yimou
- List of cult films

== Sources ==
- Levine, Josh (2000). The Coen Brothers: The Story of Two American Film Makers. Canasa: ECW Press. ISBN 978-1-55022-424-5.
- Robson, Eddie (2003). Coen Brothers. London, England: Virgin Books. ISBN 978-0-753-54770-0.
- Silver, Alain; Ward, Elizabeth, eds. (1992). Film Noir: An Encyclopedic Reference to the American Style (3rd ed.). Woodstock, New York: The Overlook Press. ISBN 0-87951-479-5.

Awards
Preceded by Old Enough	Sundance Grand Jury Prize: U.S. Dramatic; 1985	Succeeded by Smooth Talk
