= Torch Song (1993 film) =

- DVD cover
- Genre: Drama
- Written by: Janet Brownell; Leonora Thuna
- Story by: Judith Krantz
- Directed by: Michael Miller
- Starring: Raquel Welch; Jack Scalia; Alicia Silverstone; George Newbern; Laura Innes
- Music by: Lee Holdridge
- Country of origin: United States
- Original language: English

Production
- Executive producer: Steve Krantz
- Producer: Stephanie Austin
- Cinematography: Kees Van Oostrum
- Editor: Paul Rubell
- Running time: 89 minutes
- Production companies: Multimedia Motion Pictures; Steve Krantz Productions

Original release
- Network: ABC
- Release: May 23, 1993

Torch Song (also known as Judith Krantz's Torch Song) is a 1993 made-for-TV movie directed by Michael Miller and starring Raquel Welch, Jack Scalia, and Alicia Silverstone. The film originally premiered on ABC on 23 May 1993.

== Plot ==
Paula Eastman (Raquel Welch) is a Hollywood actress with an alcohol problem. Her career is doing poorly, and she sometimes sleeps with actors and producers to get roles; often, she comes home drunk. Paula changes her manager, and her career improves, but her personal life isn't improving along with it. Because of her alcoholism, her relationship with her daughter Delphine (Alicia Silverstone) is strained.

One night, Delphine photographs her mother while she is drunk. After Paula sees the photos, she enters rehabilitation because she doesn't want to see her daughter unhappy. In rehab, she meets a firefighter named Mike (Jack Scalia) who has similar problems. After she returns home, she wants to forge a relationship with Mike and spend time with her daughter, but Delphine is suspicious of Mike, believing him to be much like the other men in her mother's life.

== Cast ==
- Raquel Welch as Paula Eastman
- Jack Scalia as Mike Lanahan
- Alicia Silverstone as Delphine
- George Newbern as Wedge
- Laura Innes as Ronnie
- Stan Ivar as Ken
- Lee Garlington as Phyllis
