= Shattered Dreams (1990 film) =

1990 film directed by Robert Iscove

- Genre: Drama
- Based on: Shattered Dreams: The Story of Charlotte Fedders by Charlotte Fedders
- Written by: David Hill
- Directed by: Robert Iscove
- Starring: Lindsay Wagner; Michael Nouri; Georgann Johnson; James Karen
- Music by: Michael Convertino
- Country of origin: United States
- Original language: English

Production
- Producers: Stephanie Austin; Lindsay Wagner
- Cinematography: John Beymer
- Editor: Michael Brown
- Running time: 103 minutes
- Production company: Carolco Pictures

Original release
- Network: CBS
- Release: May 13, 1990

Shattered Dreams is a 1990 American made-for-television drama film directed by Robert Iscove, based on the 1987 book, Shattered Dreams: The Story of Charlotte Fedders by Charlotte Fedders. The film stars Lindsay Wagner and Michael Nouri. The film premiered on Sunday, May 13, 1990 on CBS.

== Plot ==
Charlotte O'Donnell and John Fedders meet at Catholic University where John is in law school, and Charlotte attends nursing school. The two fall in love, date, and get married.

In 1968, they move to New York City, where John works at a prominent Wall Street law firm and Charlotte becomes a nurse. Their marriage begins to deteriorate due to John's increasingly abusive behavior. After John hits her, breaking her eardrum, Charlotte goes home to her parents and asks John for a divorce. John cries and apologizes, saying it will never happen again. Charlotte says they have more than just themselves to think about, and announces she is pregnant.

By 1973, the Fedderses have moved to Washington, D.C. They have two sons, Luke, and Mark, and Charlotte is pregnant again. Charlotte has given up nursing to be a housewife. John continues his controlling and abusive behavior. Charlotte goes to talk to a priest, who reminds her of her sacred vows, telling her to go home and love John, and look to the heavens for answers.

By 1978, the Fedderses have four sons and John's behavior has not changed. After John beats her in front of the children, Charlotte takes the boys to her neighbor Elaine's house to call her sitter Dotty. Dotty and Elaine try to convince Charlotte to press charges, but she refuses and locks herself in a bathroom. Charlotte goes back to the house to pack and leave a letter for John, hoping he will get help. Before she leaves, John apologizes again, and she takes him back.

By 1983, the Fedderses have five sons and John has gotten a job as the Director of Enforcement for the SEC. Charlotte goes to counseling on her own, where she learns about battered woman syndrome. When John nearly hits their oldest son, Charlotte throws him out.

Charlotte hires an attorney, and they go to court. On the witness stand, John testifies that he believes Charlotte enjoyed the abuse. The next day, John's lawyer asks for him to be granted the time to pursue reconciliation because he is remorseful. Charlotte's lawyer counters that he was always remorseful for the abuse, nothing changes, and she does not want to reconcile. The judge grants 60 days for reconciliation, and Charlotte storms out of the court.

John resigns his position at the SEC, in wake of negative attention his personal problems are causing. John sends Charlotte a letter saying he hopes to meet with her when she's ready. She goes to meet him, only because of court order. John starts to pressure her about a reconciliation. She throws his ring on the ground and drives away. They are granted a divorce and Charlotte helps other battered women.

== Cast ==
- Lindsay Wagner as Charlotte Fedders
- Michael Nouri as John Fedders
- Georgann Johnson as Helen O'Donnell
- James Karen as Charles O'Donnell
- Stan Ivar as Bryan Renehan
- Jay R. Ferguson as Luke Fedders (teenager)

== Release ==
The film premiered on Sunday, May 13, 1990 on CBS.

== Reception ==
Richard F. Shepard of The New York Times said "an intelligently thought-out script acted with powerful but restrained emotion makes Shattered Dreams, a new made-for-television film about wife abuse a moving and believable drama".

David Hiltbrand of People gave the film a "B", saying, "Wagner is good as the battered woman, but it is Nouri’s ferocious intensity that makes this drama so disturbing."

== Home media ==
The film was released on DVD on December 16, 2003 from Lionsgate.
