= The Fine White Mist of Winter =

- Short story by Joyce Carol Oates
- Country: United States
- Language: English

Publication
- Published in: The Literary Review
- Publication date: Spring 1962

"The Fine White Mist of Winter" is a short story by Joyce Carol Oates, originally published in The Literary Review (Spring 1962). The story was first collected in By the North Gate (1963) by Vanguard Press. The story was selected for publication in the 1963 anthology The Best American Short Stories and Prize Stories: The O. Henry Award.

The story is set, as are others in By the North Gate, in Oates's fictional "Eden County", similar to the rural upstate New York community where she was raised.

== Plot ==
Eden county deputy sheriff Rafe Murray apprehends Bethl'em Aire, a suspected criminal of local notoriety in a farm field at sundown. Murray is white and Aire is black. Binding Aire's hands with a cord, the sheriff places his captive in the patrol car. En route to town a freak snowstorm forces Murray to seek shelter in a remote country gas station. Two black mechanics, one young and one old, operate the garage. Momentarily alarmed, they invite the officer inside, where the deputy unbinds his captive's wrists.

Murray, a 38-year-old family man, adopts a patronizing attitude toward his prisoner and the two other Negros. The younger Negro gives Aire a cigarette, and asks the sheriff why the man has been arrested. Asserting his authority, Murray replies "A matter of the law." Ignoring the deputy sheriff, the younger man begins to praise Sheriff Walpole, Murray's superior, and casually mocks the justice system for its treatment of poor whites and blacks. Trapped until the storm passes and his ethics challenged, Murray's attempts to justify the arrest, suggesting that Aire would have died in the storm had he not been captured. The black mechanics chuckle quietly with contempt. The deputy grips the handle of his pistol in suppressed rage and humiliation. The two mechanics are now openly derisive of the deputy. Aire rises from his chair, aware that his own dignity is threatened.

The storm passes, and the deputy and his captive depart together, Murray suffering from "a strange, sinister, diffuse shame." Aire's hands are left unbound.

== Retrospective appraisal ==
Oates, in assembling her collection of short fiction Where Are You Going, Where Have You Been?: Selected Early Stories (1993), wrote that her literary motives had to do with "memorializing people, or a landscape, or an event".

Oates included the following passage from "The Fine White Mist of Winter" in the Afterword to the Where Are You Going collection, revealing its "subterranean philosophical query" in her early writing:

Rafe Murray stared out at the great banks of white, toppled and slanted in the dark. Beyond his surface paralysis, he felt something else, something peculiar - a sense, maybe, of the familiarity of the landscape. He had watched such scenes as this in the winters of his childhood further north, when he used to crouch at his bedroom window in the dark and peer out at the night, at the snow falling or the fine whirling mist, which held no strangeness, he felt, except what people thought strange in it - the chaos of something not yet formed...the earth seemed to role out of sight, like something too gigantic to conceive of.

== Theme ==
"The Fine Mist of Winter" examines questions of "free will, human justice, and personal identity" in a confrontation involving a white deputy sheriff, his black prisoner, and two black owners of a gas station. According to critic Greg Johnson, the title of the work points to its thematic center:

The "white mist" of the storm, expressing the larger world's moral neutrality and mocking Rafe's own whiteness, forces him to see the arbitrary nature of his long-held assumptions about race, the law, and himself."

Written in 1963, the story can be placed in the historical context of the tumultuous 1960s, serving as an allegory for the emerging "social and psychological unrest that would erupt violently throughout the remainder of the decade."

== Sources ==
- Johnson, Greg. 1994. Joyce Carol Oates: A Study of the Short Fiction. Twayne's studies in short fiction; no. 57. Twayne Publishers, New York. ISBN 0-8057-0857-X
- Oates, Joyce Carol. 1963. By the North Gate. Vanguard Press, New York. Library of Congress Catalog Card Number: 63-13790
