= Tom Cole (writer) =

American playwright and screenwriter

- Born: Charles Thomas Cole; April 8, 1933; Paterson, New Jersey, U.S.
- Died: February 23, 2009 (aged 75); Roxbury, Connecticut, U.S.
- Occupation: Writer
- Spouse: Joyce Chopra (m. 1969; died 2009)
- Children: 1

Charles Thomas Cole (April 8, 1933 – February 23, 2009) was an American playwright and screenwriter. He wrote the screenplay for Smooth Talk.

== Biography ==
Charles Thomas Cole was born in 1933 in Paterson, New Jersey. His father, David L. Cole, the son of Russian immigrants, was one of the early pioneers in arbitrating labor disputes, serving under every US president from Franklin D. Roosevelt to Richard Nixon.

Cole attended public schools in Paterson then went on to receive his undergraduate degree from Harvard University in American history and literature. After graduating in 1954, he enlisted in the United States Army where he was assigned to study Russian at the Army Language School in Monterey, California. He was assigned to Moscow in the Summer of 1959 as an interpreter at the American National Exhibition, which exhibited American art, culture, science and technology to residents of the Soviet Union. He was responsible for describing American farm machinery to visitors and was an observer at the impromptu Kitchen Debate, between Vice President of the United States, Richard Nixon and Premier of the Soviet Union, Nikita Khrushchev. He returned to Harvard, where he was awarded a master's degree in Slavic Languages and Literature. He was on the faculty of Massachusetts Institute of Technology, teaching Russian and English literature from 1964 to 1971 and was instrumental in starting a film program there.

=== Writing ===
Cole's writing activities have spanned fiction, theater, film and translation. Through the 1960s and early 1970s, Cole's short stories were published in the Atlantic, Esquire, Saturday Evening Post, Kenyon Review and other magazines. His first story, Familiar Usage in Leningrad, won the Atlantic 'First' Award in 1961 and was a top winner in the O'Henry Prize Stories anthology (Doubleday, N.Y., 1962). His stories were also included in the 1966 and 1970 editions of the same yearly collection. The immense Journey of the Late Season Traveler was anthologized in All Our Secrets Are The Same: New Fiction From Esquire. His volume of fiction, An End to Chivalry, a short novel and five stories, published by Atlantic-Little Brown, received the Rosenthal Award of the Academy of Arts & Letters in 1966.

The story of Dwight H. Johnson, an African-American Vietnam War veteran who had won the Medal of Honor for valor in combat and was shot and killed by police in 1971 while holding up a Detroit convenience store, became the impetus for Medal of Honor Rag, a two-character play that fictionalized the story as a confrontation set at an Army Hospital in 1971 between Dale Jackson, a troubled African-American war hero and a white psychiatrist who specializes in "impacted grief". First produced in Boston and Washington, DC at the Folger Theater, it was staged at the Theater De Lys in New York in 1976 with Howard Rollins as Johnson and David Clennon as the psychiatrist. In his review in The Washington Post, Richard Cox described the play as "extraordinary in concept and performance"; The New York Times' critic, Clive Barnes, wrote that "It is a remarkably effective, strong and harrowing play." Medal of Honor Rag was a nominee for both the Drama Desk and Obie Awards before moving on to regional theaters across the country. A television version of the play was broadcast in April 1982 on PBS's American Playhouse, directed by Lloyd Richards and produced by Joyce Chopra.

Cole translated "Letter to a Teacher" from the Italian (Random House, 1970) and two works of theater from the Russian: Ostrovsky's "The Forest," commissioned and produced by the Milwaukee Repertory Theater in 1984 and Gogol's novel, "Dead Souls," which he also adapted for the American stage, drawing in part from Bulgakov's Moscow Art Theatre version. "Dead Souls" had full-scale productions at the Milwaukee Rep and Trinity Square in Providence, and was published by the Theatre Communications Group in its anthology New Plays USA 1, in 1982.

Fighting Bob, a play about progressive Wisconsin Senator Robert M. La Follette, Sr., premiered in 1979 by the Milwaukee Rep. The play was performed off Broadway at the Astor Place Theatre in 1981. In his review in The New York Times, Mel Gussow called the play "stubbornly undramatic", with "facts, figures, excerpts from press reports" normally printed in the program of a historical play spoken in the performance.

About Time debuted in 1990 at the John Houseman Theater, a two-character play about an elderly couple, identified only as Old Man and Old Woman, arguing about matters around the subject of death. Directed by Tony Giordano, the play's original production starred James Whitmore and Audra Lindley, described in a Mel Gussow review as an "endearing couple" who "act their way through and around the slight play that Tom Cole has created for them". The New Yorker's John Simon wrote, "There is much that is funny and true in "About Time": some if it in the writing, some of it in Tony Giordano's direction, and a whole lot in the acting. The long and the short of it is that whatever the longeurs and other shortcomings of Cole's play, you care for these people; you wish them solace in their sexual games and even paltrier verbal scurrilities". Lindley and Whitmore had been married to each other and divorced in 1979, yet continued to perform with each other on stage.

Cole's collaboration with Joyce Chopra in film began in 1970 with "Present Tense", adapted from Thomas Mann's "Disorder and Early Sorrow" and televised nationally on WNET Playhouse. Their documentaries, "Joyce At 34" and "Martha Clarke Light & Dark: A Dancer's Journal" also appeared on PBS. He wrote the screenplay for the 1985 film Smooth Talk, based on the 1966 short story Where Are You Going, Where Have You Been? by Joyce Carol Oates. The film told the story of a teenage girl exploring her sexual identity, whose portrayal by Laura Dern helped bring her to fame in what was the surprise hit of that year's Sundance Film Festival where it won the Grand Jury Prize for best dramatic feature. The film, directed by Joyce Chopra, won acclaim for its portrayal of Dern's character and her awkward transition to adulthood. Writing in The New York Times, film critic Vincent Canby wrote that "Joyce Chopra, the director, and Tom Cole, who wrote the screenplay, have made Smooth Talk a remarkably fine film about the muddle of emotions that separates the child from the adult. Though Miss Chopra and Mr. Cole have expanded the story, and supplied information Miss Oates saw fit to leave out, Smooth Talk is as spare and lean as the source material. In this age of movies designed to satisfy teen-agers' fantasies about themselves, Smooth Talk has the shock value of The Grapes of Wrath seen among a bunch of not-great screwball comedies of the Depression era. It's funny, but there's also something menacing about it, like the high, thin clouds that always seem to be neutralizing the light but not the heat of the Marin County summer sun."

=== Death ===
Cole died at age 75 on February 23, 2009, of multiple myeloma at his home in Roxbury, Connecticut. He was survived by his wife, Joyce Chopra, and a daughter. An earlier marriage to Ellen Nurnberg ended in divorce.
