= Micah Perks =

American novelist

Micah Perks is an American fiction writer and memoirist. Her three books, We Are Gathered Here (St. Martin's Press 1997), Pagan Time (Counterpoint Press 2001), and What Becomes Us (2016) examine the utopian impulse in U.S. history.

== Biography ==
Micah Perks grew up on a commune in the Adirondack Mountains. She later went to high school in Middlebury, Vermont, and received her BA and MFA from Cornell University. She is a 2008 recipient of a National Endowment for the Arts Literary Fellowship Grant, five Pushcart Prize nominations and has been a resident of the Blue Mountain Center several times. She has taught at Cornell University, Hobart and William Smith Colleges and University of California, Santa Cruz, where she is Professor of Literature and Co-Director of The Creative Writing Program, with her partner, Latin American/Latino critic Juan Poblete. They live in Santa Cruz, California with their four children.

== Literary works ==
=== Novels ===
We Are Gathered Here (St. Martin's 1997) is set in the 1880s. Regina Sartwell, a wealthy young woman with epilepsy, and Olive Honsinger, her maid, join in friendship and a fierce desire to escape Victorian conventions. As Perks describes in "Escaping the Ending," this novel is based on her great, great aunt Regina, who was imprisoned in her home because she had epilepsy. She jumped from her third floor window three times before she succeeded in killing herself. Perks writes: "I wanted to reach back in time and find another way out for her." In the Los Angeles Times Book Review, Feb. 18, 1996, Erin J. Aubry writes "We are Gathered Here is nothing short of a woman's manifesto. It addresses an astonishing array of issues--independence, marriage, work, female companionship, goddess worship, pregnancy, abortion, emotional repression, sexual abuse--all in a tightly woven story that is as fanciful as it is grimly real...This is a book that reaches across more than 100 years of difference between its time and ours to affirm an eternal human need for love, with not a whit of energy lost in the translation."

What Becomes Us (Outpost19 Books). In this novel, twin fetuses tell the story of their mild-mannered mother who abandons her controlling husband to start fresh in a small town in upstate New York. But her seemingly ideal neighbors are violently divided by the history Evie is teaching at the high school—the captivity and restoration of colonist Mary Rowlandson, a watershed conflict that leads our little narrators to ask big questions about love, survival, coveting the man next door and what exactly is a healthy appetite. Lauren Groff, author of Fates and Furies, writes "I've been obsessed with Mary Rowlandson for 20 years. Micah Perks writes about her with fireworks. This is a warm, wild, hilarious, eccentric and moving book."

=== Memoir ===
Pagan Time (Counterpoint hardcover 2001, paperback forthcoming November, 2009) is a memoir about Perks' childhood growing up in an experimental commune school in the Adirondack Mountains during the sixties and early seventies. "This wonderful book has distilled the sixties into a rare and potent tincture. It is bittersweet, dangerous, full of mad enthusiasms, wild adventures, sexual excess, and genuine tragedy. Micah Perks never loses her perfect pitch...I could not put it down and cannot forget it." Peter Coyote

=== Short stories ===
- "The Comeback Tour", Chicago Quarterly Review, Winter, 2012
- "Misrule", Forklift Ohio: a journal of Poetry, Cooking and Light Industrial Safety. Fall, 2011
- "Happily Ever After", Red Wheelbarrow, Winter, 2010
- "What The Thin Ones Eat", VIZ Inter-Arts: A Trans-Genre anthology, 2007, pp. 171.
- "We Are The Same People", The Best Underground Fiction, anthology, Stolen Time Publishing, 2006, pp. 106–130.
- "Dear Lucille", Columbia, Spring 2004, p. 62-72.
- "Quiero Bailar Slow With You Tonight", ZZYZZYVA, Spring 2004, pp. 155–165.
- "We Are the Same People", Massachusetts Review, Spring 2004. pp. 120–132.
- "Breathing Room", Epoch, Summer 2001, pp. 108–110.
- "Younger Men", River City, Summer 2000, pp. 16–24.
- "Letters: Real and Sent", Red Wheelbarrow, Spring 1999, pp. 44–50.
- "Anyone Is Possible, Anyone Is Possible (anthology), Red Hen Press, January 1997, pp. 217-224.
- "Wild Things", The Book Press, February 1997, pp. 6–7.
- "Anyone Is Possible", Louisville Review, Awards Issue, Fall 1996, pp. 122–130.
- "With Chickens Watching", Southwest Review, Spring 1994, pp. 366–373.
- "Honey", American Voice, Summer 1992, pp. 5–12.
- "My Family with Black Flies", Blueline, Summer 1992, pp. 21–26.
- "Natural Accidents", The Alaska Review, Spring 1990, pp. 51–58.
- "Ledgerbirds", Primavera, Fall 1989, pp. 64–72.
- "The Hummingbird", Epoch, Winter 1988, pp. 103–107.

=== Essays ===
- "Escaping the Ending", Encyclopedia, 2006, p. 249-252.
- "All Tied Up: Saturday Rumpus Essay: Homeland and the Female Fabulists", The Rumpus
- "Saturday Rumpus Interview with Ben Strader"
