= Unmailed, Unwritten Letters =

Short story by Joyce Carol Oates

- Short story by Joyce Carol Oates
- Country: United States
- Language: English

Publication
- Published in: The Hudson Review
- Publication date: Spring 1969

"Unmailed, Unwritten Letters" is a short story by Joyce Carol Oates originally published in The Hudson Review (Spring 1969), and first collected in The Wheel of Love (1970) by Vanguard Press.

The story was reprinted in Prize Stories 1970: The O. Henry Awards; Oates was awarded their Special Award for Continuing Excellence.

== Plot ==
The story is written in epistolary form, presenting a number of cryptic letters to a number of addresses written by an unnamed female.

"Dear Mother and Father" appear to be letters to her parents living the American Southwest: "I think of you and I think of protoplasm being drawn off into space, out in the West, with no human limits to keep it safe."

"Dear Marsha Katz" are letters to a female rival who is accused of stalking the narrator: "Why are you pursuing me?...Are you beginning to feel terror at having lost? Your father and I are not lovers, we hardly see each other anymore..."

"Dear Greg" are letters to a former husband, recounting their first meeting: "I count only three miscarriages. The fourth a sentimental miscalculation."

"My darling" are letters to a deceased husband who died tragically in an automobile accident: "The streets are dirty. A tin can lies on a sidewalk...The edge is jagged and rusty...I press the edge of the lid against my wrist..."

"To The Editor" concerns her perceived harassment by black unemployed young men who ogle or accost her on the streets of Detroit: "I want to cut up my body, I can't live in this body."

"Dear Mrs. Katz" is a letter to Marsha Katz's mother. The narrator denies that she has had an affair with her husband: "Your husband and I have only met a few times socially. What do you want from me?"

== Retrospective appraisal ==
Biographer Joanne V. Creighton considers the least successful Oatesian narratives those that, like "Unmailed, Unwritten Letters," depend on an "unrelieved interior monologue" written in the first-person.

Creighton argues that the story fails to develop "dramatic intensity" due to the drone of its detailed inventory documenting the protagonists "near-hysteria." Delivered in epistolary form, "the staccato-like report of this driven woman is awkward, monotonous, and annoying."

The story fails to develop in "dramatic intensity," and is never satisfactorily resolved. As such, no catharsis is made available to the reader. The female protagonist "internalizes the romantic code that views men as valiant protectors and women as beautiful objects, and that Oates ironically subverts by showing the psychological extremes of degradation suffered by women who view themselves as powerless."
