= Accomplished Desires =

- Short story by Joyce Carol Oates
- Country: United States
- Language: English

Publication
- Published in: Esquire
- Publication date: May 1968

"Accomplished Desires" is a short story by Joyce Carol Oates originally published in Esquire (May 1968) and first collected in The Wheel of Love (1970) by Vanguard Press.

The story was awarded second prize in Prize Stories 1969: The O. Henry Awards.

== Plot ==
"Accomplished Desires" is written from third-person omniscient point-of-view. The story is divided into five sections, I thru V.

Section I: Dorie is a petite and pretty 21-year-old student at an exclusive girl's college in New England. She is having an affair with her English professor and novelist Mark Arber. He is married with children. His wife, Barbara Scott, is a published poet and Pulitzer Prize winner.

In an academic environment where the dons value high I.Q.s and superior intellect, Dorie, who is scholastically only average, is content to conceal her mediocrity. Dorie's infatuation with the 45-year-old Mark is motivated less by his physical or intellectual attributes - "ugly, arrogant face with discolored teeth" - but more through her envy of his accomplished spouse: "Dorie Weinheimer [was] obsessed with jealousy. She did not know what she wanted most, this man or the victory over his wife."

A stealthy girl capable of low-cunning, she quickly engineers her seduction of the professor.

Section II: At 43-years-old, Barbara Scott, a nom de plume, is a "hefty, perspiring woman" who had benefited from a decade of psychoanalysis with regard to the success of her poetry. She has little interest in domestic and maternal matters. Her boys are self-reliant and precocious. She is a functioning alcoholic.

Mark arrives home late and announces to Barbara that he has engaged a au pair to board with the family and handle domestic duties, and introduces Dorie. Barbara submits to the arrangement of having a "permanent babysitter," but suspects the truth.

Section III: Domestically, Dorie performs too well, cleaning and ordering the cluttered house and yard: her efforts seem a reproach to Barbara. Mark's demeanor becomes rather jaunty: Dorie accompanies him almost everywhere as his personal secretary. Barbara suffers, knowing that a nonentity like Dorie has captivated her husband. Dorie's effort to clean up after the slovenly Arber family humiliates Barbara. She compensates by overeating. Three months have passed. Mark makes an unexpected visit to Barbara's writing loft. He informs her that Dorrie is pregnant, a situation he blames on the girl. Barbara is nonplussed, and asks if Mark wants a divorce. He equivocates: "You know how I feel about disruption." He pleads with Barbara to drive Dorie to a Boston clinic for an abortion. He argues that their marriage has been an exceptional one, and that he honors Barbara for her fortitude. Sensing that Mark is mentally unstable, she consents.

Section IV: On the drive to Boston, Dorie is frightened about the procedure. Barbara reassures her, and experiences a moment of sympathy for the girl. Sitting next to the prim and stylish Dorie, she has "sudden terrible conviction that language itself did not matter and that nothing mattered ultimately but the [human] body." An unstated mother-daughter awareness arises momentarily between the women.

Section V: Barbara is found dead in a motel room, a suicide. Mark experiences "perpetual guilty astonishment." Dorrie is not surprised and had long anticipated that her perfidy would lead to just such an outcome.

She and Mark are married a month after Barbara's death, and proudly becomes the second Mrs. Arber. She becomes pregnant, drops out of college, and gives birth to a daughter. She is satisfied with her domestic duties: she has no intellectual understanding of Mark's literary endeavors.

Dorrie attempts to read Barbara's poetry but finds it incomprehensible: "She was herself and that was a fact, a final fact she would never overcome."

== Theme ==
Literary critic Greg Johnson identifies the "arresting first sentence" in the story as the key to Oates's thematic concerns: "There was a man she loved with a violent love, and she spent much of her time thinking about his wife." Here Oates suggests three themes: the reciprocity of love and violence; purported love as merely an obsessive bid for personal power; and the displacement of a formidable sexual rival as a substitute for securing genuine intimacy with a lover. Johnson writes:

The unaccomplished Dorie, engaged in her struggle to wrest her English professor away from his wife (a Pulitzer Prize-winning poet), unconsciously seeks power both by aligning herself with a charismatic male and by replacing an accomplished woman, creative woman.

After the professor's wife conveniently commits suicide, he and the already pregnant Dorie proceed to marry. The baby girl she gives birth to is the only compensation for what she now realizes is an empty victory. None of the creative talents or success achieved by the deceased wife are conferred upon Dorie - only the dubious status of being the second, albeit prettier, Mrs. Abner.

Biographer Joanne V. Creighton, quoting from the story, notes the fate of the young and "vacuous" wife and the depth of her isolation.

[S]he was this girl sitting at a battered desk in someone's attic, and no one else, no other person...she was herself and that was a fact, a final fact she would never overcome.

Johnson reminds readers that "Oates's focus is less on the battle itself than the ultimate hollowness of Dorrie's victory, achieved at the cost of Barbara's suicide."

== Sources ==
- Creighton, Joanne V.. 1979. Joyce Carol Oates. Twayne Publishers, New York. Warren G. French, editor. ISBN 0-8057-7212-X
- Johnson, Greg. 1994. Joyce Carol Oates: A Study of the Short Fiction. Twayne's studies in short fiction; no. 57. Twayne Publishers, New York. ISBN 0-8057-0857-X
- Oates, Joyce Carol. 1970. The Wheel of Love. Vanguard Press, New York.ISBN 978-0814906767
