= Elizabeth Fishel =

American journalist

Elizabeth Fishel is a journalist and author. In 2013, Fishel published her fifth book, coauthored with Jeffrey Arnett, Getting To 30: A Parent's Guide to the 20-Something Years (Workman, originally titled, When Will My Grown-Up Kid Grow Up?) In 2000, Fishel published a book profiling 10 of her classmates from the class of 1968 at Brearley School titled Reunion: The Girls We Used to Be, the Women We Became. Her book I Swore I'd Never Do That! was awarded "Best Parenting Book" by Parent's Choice Award in 1991. Earlier books include Sisters (1979, reissued in 1997) and The Men In Our Lives (1985).

Fishel has also written for various magazines and newspapers, including Oprah's O, Vogue, Good Housekeeping, More, Redbook, Parents, Ms., Parenting, The New York Times Book Review and the San Francisco Chronicle.

She presently lives in Oakland, California, with her spouse, Robert Houghteling. They have two sons.

== Bibliography ==
- Getting To 30: A Parent's Guide to the 20-Something Years, Workman, 2013 ISBN 978-0-7611-7966-5 (originally titled, When Will My Grown-Up Kid Grow Up?)
- Something That Matters: Life, Love, and Unexpected Adventures in the Middle of the Journey, Harwood Press, 2007 ISBN 978-0-9728110-1-9
- Wednesday Writers: 10 Years of Writing Women's Lives, Harwood Press, 2003 ISBN 0-9728110-0-1.
- Reunion: The Girls We Used to Be, The Women We Became, Random House, 2000 ISBN 0-679-44983-3.
- I Swore I'd Never Do That!: Recognizing Family Patterns & Making Wise Parenting Choices, Conari, 1994 (originally published as Family Mirrors, Houghton Mifflin, 1991) ISBN 0-943233-69-0.
- The Men in Our Lives: Fathers, Lovers, Husbands, Mentors, William Morrow, 1985 ISBN 0-688-03960-X
- Sisters: Shared Histories, Lifelong Ties, Conari, 1994 (originally published by William Morrow, 1979) ISBN 1-57324-092-3.

== Quotes ==
- "Both within the family and without, our sisters hold up our mirrors: our images of who we are and of who we can dare to become."
- "A sister is both your mirror -- and your opposite."
