= How I Contemplated the World from the Detroit House of Correction and Began My Life Over Again =

- Short story by Joyce Carol Oates
- Country: United States
- Language: English

Publication
- Published in: TriQuarterly
- Publication date: Spring 1969

"How I Contemplated the World from the Detroit House of Correction and Began My Life Over Again" is a short story by Joyce Carol Oates originally published in TriQuarterly (Spring 1969) and first collected in The Wheel of Love (1970) by Vanguard Press.

This frequently anthologized work was included in Best American Short Stories (1970) and Prize Stories 1970: The O. Henry Awards.

== Plot ==
"How I Contemplated the World" is divided into twelve sections, I thru XII, each with a title. Some of the sections are further organized into shorter sections: 1...2...3. etc. The story is told from a first-person point-of-view, but here the narrator addresses herself in the third-person. The first section opens: "This girl (myself) is walking through Branden's, that excellent store."

The year is 1968. The sixteen-year-old girl (unnamed) lives with her parents in an exclusive housing division outside of Detroit. She attends a private high school. The administrators have warned her parents that she is not performing at her I.Q. level. Her mother is a socialite and her father, a doctor, has a lucrative psychiatric practice treating wealthy patients.

The girl reflects on the thrill of stealing accessories from upscale stores. If she is caught, she can depend on her well-connected father to make arrangements to have the charges dropped. The girl has ample funds to purchase what she wishes, but enjoys stealing - a kleptomaniac.

Clarita is a thirty-something woman the girl has met while slumming around impoverished areas of Detroit. Her apartment serves as a crib for turning tricks. Clarita's lover-pimp is addicted to pills. He is running from the law and fears the F.B.I. will arrest him. The couple initiate the girl into prostitution, first addicting her to heroin. The girl is arrested for shoplifting, she has a bout of hysteria and resisted arrest. In the House of Corrections she is severely beaten by Princess and Dolly, two other incarcerated teenagers.

After her ordeal, she returns home, fully reformed and dedicated to her family.

== Theme ==
A teenage girl, alienated from her well-to-do family, escapes to a Detroit slum and is forced into prostitution by a heroin addict. More a coming-of-age narrative than a cautionary tale, she returns home to reconsider her future.

The protagonist's female tormentors, Princess and Dolly, are themselves subject to the will of their pimps. They in turn displace their "frustrated need for revenge" onto the younger and vulnerable newcomer.

Literary critic Greg Johnson notes that Oates is skeptical of gender-based explanations suggesting innate behavior. With regard to the young women's brutal assaults on the protagonist, Princess and Dolly merely appropriate the prerogatives of male aggression in an effort to compensate for their own degradation.

Oates implies that under these socially conditioned circumstances, human beings are presented with playing one of two roles: "[E]ither destructive mastery or a helpless, craven submission." Biographer Joanne V. Creitghton summarizes the story's denouement:

[D]espite her rebellion, which included stealing and living with a junkie, she is, in the end, overpowered by her affluent and influential parents and returned to the sterile sanctuary of their world."

Johnson concurs that the girl "enacts a conservative retreat into her corrupt, loveless, but physically safe home," but adds this observation:

Oates nevertheless suggests that the girl's struggle toward self-hood continues despite the obstacles of American materialism, violence, and enforced feminine subservience she has begun to recognize and may eventually overcome.

== Sources ==
- Creighton, Joanne V. 1979. Joyce Carol Oates. Twayne Publishers, New York. Warren G. French, editor. ISBN 0-8057-7212-X
- Johnson, Greg. 1994. Joyce Carol Oates: A Study of the Short Fiction. Twayne's studies in short fiction; no. 57. Twayne Publishers, New York. ISBN 0-8057-0857-X
- Oates, Joyce Carol. 1970. The Wheel of Love. Vanguard Press, New York.ISBN 978-0814906767
