= In the Region of Ice (short story) =

Short story by Joyce Carol Oates

- Short story by Joyce Carol Oates
- Country: United States
- Language: English

Publication
- Published in: The Atlantic
- Publication date: August 1966

"In the Region of Ice" is a short story by Joyce Carol Oates originally published in The Atlantic in August 1966, and first collected in The Wheel of Love (1970), by Vanguard Press.

Frequently anthologized, "In the Region of Ice" is ranked among Oates's finest works of fiction. The story was awarded first prize in Prize Stories 1967: The O. Henry Awards.

== Plot ==
"In the Region of Ice" is told from a third-person point-of-view by an omniscient narrator. The focal character is a nun in her early thirties, Sister Irene.

The setting is a Catholic school in the upper Mid-west. Sister Irene teaches literature; her existence is limited to performing her academic duties. Despite the cynicism of her colleagues and her mediocre students, she remains both intellectually acute and dedicated to her calling.

When a new student, Allen Weinstein, sits in on her class on Shakespeare, he engages her in a strident exchange concerning Hamlet. He appears to be highly literate and intellectually engaged. Sister Irene is impressed. Meeting after class in her office, she discovers that he is emotionally juvenile and rather vulgar, but otherwise brilliant. The 20-something Allen Weinstein, who is seeking a master's degree, has recently been kicked out of the history department for insulting comments he made to his professor. Inspired by the nun's intellectual rigor, Allen wants to change his major to English, and she consents to sponsor him.

Sister Irene is intrigued and troubled by the youth. She is both repelled and drawn to him, recognizing that he is suffering emotionally. However, she is entirely unequipped, and unwilling, to engage with him on a human level, which is what the boy seeks. She finds the prospect terrifying.

Sister Irene discovers that he has been in and out of a mental hospital, to which his father, disgusted with his son's behavior, has had him committed. Allen desperately wishes to live with his parents, but his father callously declines due to his erratic outbursts.

Sister Irene dreads that Allen's overtures may hold out an opportunity for her to emerge from her isolation. The nun is forced to confront her faith: "She was alone, and no one could help her; he was making her into a Christian, and to her that was a mystery...a magnificent and terrifying wonder." Released from the hospital, Allen visits Sister Irene and tells of the abuse he had endured at the hands of the doctors and nurses. She wishes to take his hand to show her sympathy, but dares not. Allen, who is fleeing to Canada in winter, asks for $10 for bus fare north, but she insists she has no money. The boy becomes enraged at the nun's refusal to help him in his flight. He brutally denounces her and flees the campus office.

A year passes. Sister Irene learns that Allen has ended his life by drowning in Quebec. She attempts to suppress any sense of remorse, rationalizing the she had already given her life to Christ: "If she could have felt guilt, she thought, she might at least have been able to feel something."

== Theme ==
"Oates investigates not only the withdrawal of female sexuality into a safe but sterile region of ice, but also the moral consequences of refusing human compassion to another person." —Literary critic Greg Johnson in Joyce Carol Oates: A Study of the Short Fiction (1994).

"She was terrified at what he was trying to do - he was trying to force her into a human relationship." —Carol Joyce Oates from "In the Region of Ice."

"The Region of Ice" is outstanding for its "richness and clarity of thematic statement."

The "anguish" of Sister Irene—a "fearful, emotionally frigid woman"—is largely self-inflicted and self-sustained when she rejects "the chance for redemption" offered to her by the student, Weinstein.

Sister Irene's failure to enter into a genuinely humane relationship with Weinstein, informed by the teachings of Christ, condemns her "to contemplate the moral ramifications of that choice" for the remainder of her life. In the end, Sister Irene squanders not only her carefully crafted identify, but her humanity. Biographer Joanne V. Creighton cautions that Sister Irene's fate, in Oates's complex rendering, is neither cynical nor misanthropic:

[T]he reader does not go away from the story with an overwhelming sense of hopelessness about the potentiality of all human relationships. This particular one failed because Sister Irene lacked the courage to participate in it, not because all are doomed to be ineffectual and miserable.

Oates permits the reader to distinguish between the central character's descent into "the region of ice," and his or her own capacity to reject such a fate.

== Film adaptation ==
The story was made into a 1976 short film, directed by Peter Werner while a student at the AFI Conservatory, and starring Fionnula Flanagan. In 1977, it won the Academy Award for Best Live Action Short Film.
