= Kathryn Grody =

American actress and writer

- Born: 1947 (age 78–79); Los Angeles, California, U.S.
- Occupations: Actress, writer
- Years active: 1975–1999, 2005, 2019–present
- Spouse: Mandy Patinkin (m. 1980)
- Children: 2

Kathryn Grody (born 1947) is an American actress, writer, and producer. She is known for her roles in Reds (1981), My Bodyguard (1980), and The Lemon Sisters (1989).

== Early life and education ==
Grody was born in Los Angeles, California. She studied acting at HB Studio in New York City.

== Career ==
Grody starred, alongside Diane Keaton and Carol Kane, in 1989's The Lemon Sisters. She has written and starred in a number of solo shows, including the autobiographical plays Mom's Life and The Unexpected 3rd.

In 2025, Grody and Patinkin premiered Seasoned, an indie episodic dramedy based on their real lives, at the Tribeca Festival.

== Personal life ==
She has been married to actor and singer Mandy Patinkin since 1980 and they have two children. In 2020, Gideon began filming and photographing Grody and Patinkin's daily lives, posting images and clips to multiple social media outlets. The couple soon developed a significant social media following. Later that year, Grody and Patinkin partnered with Swing Left, creating videos with their sons to encourage people to vote for Joe Biden in the 2020 United States presidential election.

In a 2025 New York Times interview with her husband Patinkin, she was critical of Israeli Prime Minister Benjamin Netanyahu’s policies during the Gaza War, calling them “the worst thing for Jewish people” and expressed concern for the weaponization of antisemitism in the aftermath of the October 7 attacks, stating that “the fact that I [sic] abhor the policies of the leader of that country does not mean I am a self-hating Jew or I’m antisemitic”. She also argued that “compassion for every person in Gaza is very Jewish”.

== Filmography (as actress) ==
Year	Title	Role	Notes
1975	The Fortune	Police Secretary	
1976	Harry and Walter Go to New York	Barbara	
1978	The Big Fix	Wendy Linker	
1979	Rich Kids	Gym Teacher	
1979	The Rose	Reporter	
1980	My Bodyguard	Ms. Jump	
1981	Whose Life Is It Anyway?	Mrs. Boyle	
1981	Reds	Crystal Eastman	
1988	Another Woman	Cynthia	
1989	Parents	Miss Baxter	
1989	The Lemon Sisters	Nola Frank	
1990	Quick Change	Mrs. Edison	
1993	Life with Mikey	Mrs. Corman	
1996	Pie in the Sky	Amy's Mom	
1997	Men with Guns	Harriet	
1999	Limbo	Frankie	
