= Where Are You Going, Where Have You Been? =

Short story by Joyce Carol Oates

- Short story by Joyce Carol Oates
- Country: United States of America
- Language: English
- Genre: Short story

Publication
- Published in: Epoch
- Media type: Print
- Publication date: Fall 1966

"Where Are You Going, Where Have You Been?" is a frequently anthologized short story written by Joyce Carol Oates. The story first appeared in the Fall 1966 edition of Epoch magazine. It was inspired by three Tucson, Arizona, murders committed by Charles Schmid, which were profiled in Life magazine in an article written by Don Moser on March 4, 1966. Oates said that she dedicated the story to Bob Dylan because she was inspired to write it after listening to his song "It's All Over Now, Baby Blue". The story was originally named "Death and the Maiden".

== Plot ==
Connie is an attractive, self-conscious 15-year-old girl. She has a strained relationship with her mother, who is jealous of her youth and beauty. Her mother constantly compares her to her sister, who is plain and hard-working. Her father is fairly distant and busy with work.

Connie enjoys going out with friends to the mall and "a drive-in restaurant where the older kids hung out". It is there, while enjoying the company of a boy, that she first sees Arnold Friend, a stranger in a gold convertible covered with cryptic writing. He says "Gonna get you, baby" to her, and she turns away from him.

A while later, her family goes to a Sunday barbecue, leaving Connie home alone. Connie enjoys this time alone, listening to music and feeling happy with simply being alive. A car comes up on the driveway, and Connie comes down from her room to see who it is. It's Arnold Friend, who asks Connie to come along with him and a friend of his on a ride. Connie is initially unsure, and declines his offer. He insists that she actually does want to ride with them. He addresses her by name, and when she asks him how he knows it, he tells her he knows her family won't be home for a while, and that he has been asking around about her to other children. His friend merely listens to the music absentmindedly.

Arnold tries to convince Connie to come out of her house but she is still unsure and slightly unsettled. She suddenly thinks to ask how old he is; he deflects the question, finally telling her he's only 18. However, she can see that he is probably closer to, and maybe older than, 30. She begins to be truly frightened, and tells them to leave, but Arnold insists they won't leave till she comes with them. He declares that he is her lover, to her shocked terror, and she threatens to call the police. He says if she does, he'll come into the house. She rushes to lock the door, but he tells her he could easily break it down. She tells the men that her father is coming, and Arnold threatens to hurt her family when they return unless she comes out to the car.

Overwhelmed with emotion, Connie retreats inside the house. Though she picks up the phone to call for help, she is unable to bring herself to use it due to a strange "wailing" she hears. After Arnold continues gently, menacingly threatening her from outside the house, Connie accepts her fate and finally comes out, feeling nothing.

== Characters ==
Connie: A beautiful girl who loves life. She is unsatisfied with her family, especially her mother, and seeks fulfillment elsewhere. She loves listening to music and is essentially a typical teenager.

Arnold Friend: A mysterious figure who visits Connie while her family is not at home and continuously demands that Connie get in the car and go on a ride with him. He attempts to be smooth talking, yet his strange, performative and threatening behaviour make Connie uneasy and scared to be with him.

Ellie: Arnold's friend who is very strange and sits in Arnold's car when they go to Connie's house. He listens to music and mostly stays back as Arnold tries to smooth talk his way to get Connie in the car with them.

Connie's Mother: Was once very beautiful when she was younger and is now a frustrating figure in Connie's life. They often argue.

June: The older sister of Connie, who is basically the opposite of her. She does everything that her family asks of her, and is doted on by their mother.

== Critical reception ==
"Oates's equation of sexual dominance and death clarifies the general theme in The Wheel of Love of biological determinism and the ongoing cycle of gender-related enslavement. The story's title enhances this theme, suggesting that Connie's present fate repeats that of her female ancestors and anticipates that of her female descendants."
—Greg Johnson (a literary critic) in Joyce Carol Oates: A Study in the Short Fiction (1994)

Considerable academic analysis has been written about the story, with scholars divided on whether it is intended to be taken literally or as allegory. Several writers focus on the series of numbers written on Arnold's car, which he indicates are a code of some sort, but which is never explained:

"Now, these numbers are a secret code, honey," Arnold Friend explained. He read off the numbers 33, 19, 17 and raised his eyebrows at her to see what she thought of that, but she didn't think much of it.

Literary scholars have interpreted this series of numbers as different Biblical references (the title appears to have been taken from Judges 19:17), as an underlining of Friend's sexual deviancy, or as a reference to the ages of Friend and his victims.

The narrative has also been viewed as an allegory for initiation into sexual adulthood, an encounter with the devil, a critique of modern youth's obsession with sexual themes in popular music, or as a dream sequence.

== Mythological and Romantic influences ==
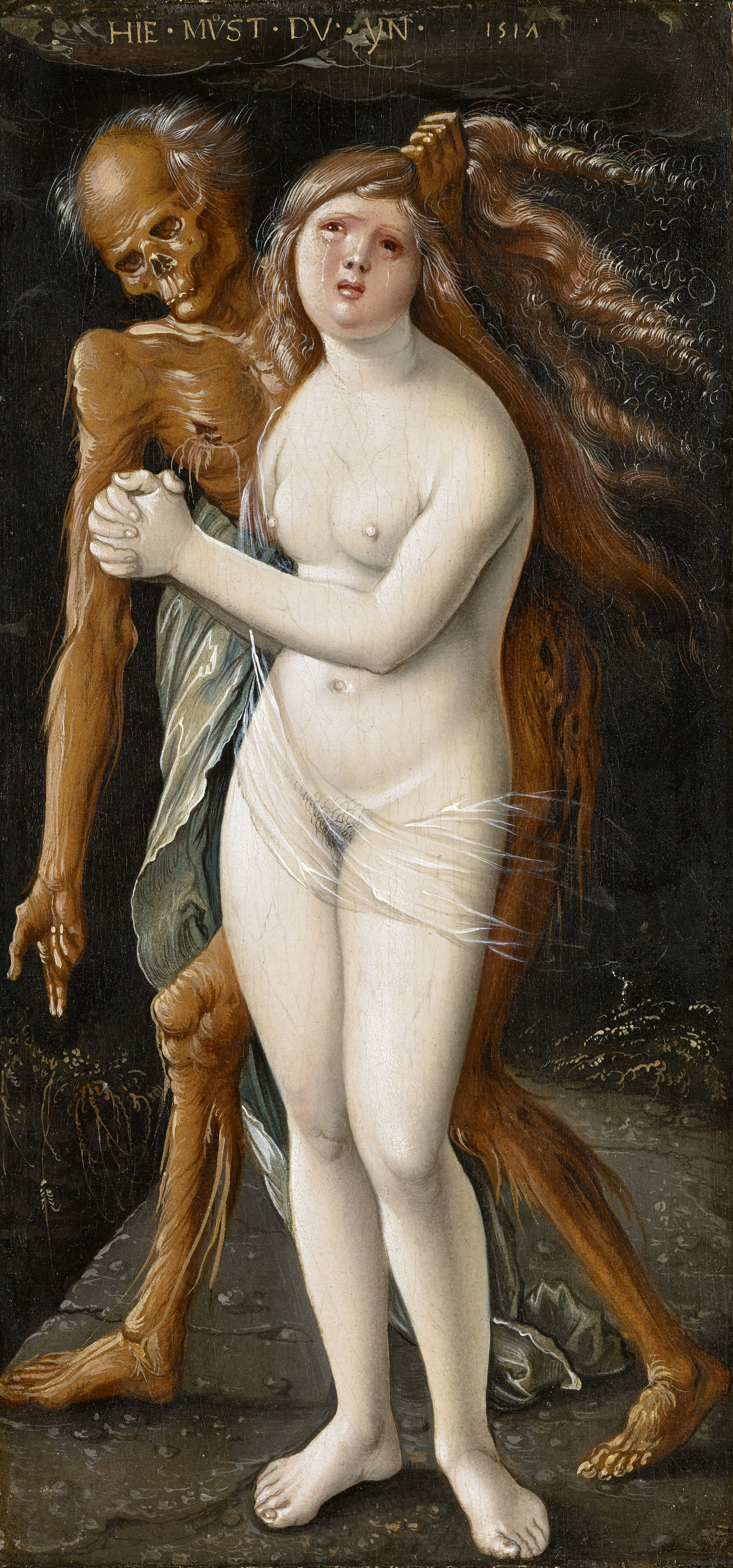
Hans Baldung (1484-1545), Death and the Maiden, 1517. Kunstmuseum Basel

Literary critic Greg Johnson describes the story as a "symbolic dream-narrative" in which Oates enlists Christian allegories to dramatize the degradation of a teenage American girl by "a demonic male figure who represents the death of her spirit." Oates also draws upon 19th century American romantic writers whose work was informed by Christian parables.

Biographer Joanne V. Creighton notes the story's allusion to the biblical parable of the Fall of man and its association to the loss of innocence in contemporary terms:

Connie's encounter with Arnold is not just a unique instance of how one girl's experimental flirtation propels her too rapidly into the world of experience...but a particularly vivid instance of a universal experience: the loss of innocence.

=== "Death and the Maiden" ===
Oates and her literary critics have identified the character Arnold Friend with the fables surrounding Satan, common in Christian mythology. Calling an early draft of the story "Death and the Maiden," Oates makes its source explicit:

Like the medieval German engraving from which my title was taken, the story was minutely detailed yet clearly an allegory of the fatal attractions of death (and the devil)."

While subsequent versions underwent changes in "tone...focus...and language," this image served as a progenitor to the final work "Where Are You Going, Where Have You Been."

=== Emily Dickinson and Nathaniel Hawthorne ===
Oates borrows the allegorical figures in Emily Dickinson's famous poem Because I could not stop for Death (first appearing under the title "The Chariot" in 1890). The opening verses of the poem read:

Because I could not stop for Death
He kindly stopped for me
The Carriage held but just Ourselves
And Immortality.

Oates acknowledged her appropriation of the symbolic imagery for the story:

"Where Are You Going, Where Have You Been" defines itself as allegorical in its conclusion: Death and Death's chariot (a funky souped-up convertible) have come for the Maiden."

Johnson writes: "Parodying the role of a gentleman caller, like the figure of Death in Emily Dickinson's 'Because I could not stop for Death', Arnold reduces Connie to a zombie-like state of docile submission..."

Oates "is essentially an American allegorist" whose literary antecedents can be traced back, in part, to Nathaniel Hawthorne. Terming "Where Are You Going" a "realistic allegory," Oates acknowledges her debt to Hawthorne's parables.

Arnold Friend's mocking observation that condemns Connie to her "permanent submission" is echoed in the title of the story: "The place where you came from ain't there anymore, and where you had in mind to go is cancelled out."

== Adaptations ==
The story was loosely adapted into the 1985 film Smooth Talk, starring Laura Dern and Treat Williams. Oates wrote an essay about the adaptation, "Where Are You Going, Where Have You Been?" and Smooth Talk: Short Story Into Film, in 1986.

The story has also been cited as an inspiration for Rose McGowan's 2014 short film Dawn as well as The Blood Brothers' 2003 song "The Salesman, Denver Max".

== Sources ==
- Joanne V. Creighton. 1979. Joyce Carol Oates. Twayne Publishers, New York. Warren G. French, editor. ISBN 0-8057-7212-X
- Johnson, Greg. 1994. Joyce Carol Oates: A Study of the Short Fiction. Twayne's studies in short fiction; no. 57. Twayne Publishers, New York. ISBN 0-8057-0857-X
