= Peter Werner =

American film and television director (1947–2023)

- Publicity photo
- Born: January 17, 1947; New York City, New York, U.S.
- Died: March 21, 2023 (aged 76); Wilmington, North Carolina, U.S.
- Occupation(s): Film, television director
- Years active: 1971–2019
- Spouse(s): Marie Ashton (divorced); Kedren Jones
- Children: 3
- Parent(s): Elizabeth Grumbach Werner; Henry Werner
- Family: Tom Werner (brother)

Peter H. Werner (January 17, 1947 – March 21, 2023) was an American film and television director. His 1976 film, In the Region of Ice, won the Academy Award for Best Live Action Short Film.

== Biography ==
Werner was born to a Jewish family, in New York City, New York, one of three children born to Elizabeth (née Grumbach) and Henry Werner. He had one sister, Patsy Werner Hanson, and one brother, Tom Werner.

In 1977, Werner won the Oscar for Best Live Action Short Film for directing the short film In the Region of Ice. Since then he worked on primarily directing television amassing a number of television film credits namely Mama Flora's Family, Two Mothers for Zachary, Call Me Claus, I Married a Centerfold, Gracie's Choice, Mom at Sixteen, Tempting Fate, among other films including Front of the Class (2008).

His television series credits include Ghost Whisperer, Medium, Law & Order: Criminal Intent, A Different World, The Wonder Years, Moonlighting, and for the Graham Yost series Boomtown and Justified, among other series. He also directed a television movie in 2010 called Bond of Silence.

== Personal life and death ==
Werner's first wife was Marie Ashton; they later divorced. His second wife was Kedren Jones. Werner was the father of three children: Lillie Werner Singh, Katharine Werner, and James Werner. He was the older brother of television producer Tom Werner.

Werner died of heart complications following a torn aorta in Wilmington, North Carolina, on March 21, 2023. He was 76.
