= Arizona Quarterly =

- Discipline: Literature
- Language: English
- Edited by: Lynda Zwinger

Publication details
- History: 1945–present
- Publisher: Johns Hopkins University Press via Project MUSE on behalf of the University of Arizona (United States)
- Frequency: Quarterly
- Open access: No

Standard abbreviations
- ISO 4: Ariz. Q.

Indexing
- ISSN: 0004-1610 (print); 1558-9595 (web)
- LCCN: 47003188
- OCLC no.: 795987055

Links
- Journal homepage; Johns Hopkins University Press; Project MUSE

Arizona Quarterly: A Journal of American Literature, Culture, and Theory is a peer-reviewed academic literary journal created at the University of Arizona in 1945. Published four times per year, its self-proclaimed mission is to "subject ['American literature, culture and theory'] to debate, argument, interpretation, contestation via critical readings of primary texts". Most issues of the Quarterly consist of seven articles, and special issues are rarely published (e.g. Summer 2014: Migration and Movement(s) in Chicano/a Literature). As of 2020 the editor is Lynda Zwinger.

During the early years of Arizona Quarterly, through 1958, there was no standalone historical journal in the state, leaving the Quarterly to publish a number of historical articles. Zwinger served as one of two associate editors under former Quarterly editor Edgar A. Dryden.
