= Smooth Talk =

1985 film by Joyce Chopra

- Theatrical release poster
- Directed by: Joyce Chopra
- Screenplay by: Tom Cole
- Based on: "Where Are You Going, Where Have You Been?" by Joyce Carol Oates
- Produced by: Martin Rosen
- Starring: Treat Williams; Laura Dern; Mary Kay Place; Elizabeth Berridge; Levon Helm
- Cinematography: James Glennon
- Edited by: Patrick Dodd
- Music by: Russ Kunkel; Bill Payne
- Production companies: American Playhouse; Goldcrest Films
- Distributed by: International Spectrafilm
- Release dates: September 10, 1985 (TIFF); November 15, 1985 (United States)
- Running time: 96 minutes
- Countries: United Kingdom; United States
- Language: English
- Budget: $1.08 million
- Box office: $16,785

Smooth Talk is a 1985 film directed by Joyce Chopra, loosely based on Joyce Carol Oates' short story "Where Are You Going, Where Have You Been?" (1966), which was in turn inspired by the Tucson murders committed by Charles Schmid. The protagonist, Connie Wyatt, is played by Laura Dern. The antagonist, Arnold Friend, is played by Treat Williams.

The film was produced by American Playhouse and Goldcrest Films, and originally released to movie theaters in 1985. The original music score was composed by Russ Kunkel and Bill Payne. The film won the Grand Jury Prize Dramatic at the 1986 Sundance Film Festival.

== Plot ==
Connie Wyatt is a restless 15-year-old who is anxious to explore the pleasures of her sexual awakening. Before she enters her sophomore year in high school, she spends the summer moping around her family farmhouse. She suffers from the put-downs of her mother, Katherine, while hearing nothing but praise for her older sister, June. Her father, Harry, somehow manages to float around the family tensions. Connie also helps paint the farmhouse, just as her mother constantly demands.

Connie passes the time cruising the local shopping mall with her friends and flirting with boys. When an actual date leads to heavy petting, she escapes from the boy's car. She visits a hamburger drive-in popular with locals, where without her knowledge, an older man observes her with interest. One night as she leaves, the man playfully informs Connie "I'm watching you!" and proves this soon after. Connie and her mother get into an argument about her going out at night and being careful with whom she flirts, which results in Katherine slapping Connie when she brings up how Katherine became a young mother. Connie declines to attend a barbecue with her family that afternoon and is abandoned in the house, while she sunbathes and listens to music.

Later, the same man who was watching Connie approaches the house in a 1960s convertible. The side of his car is painted with the name "Arnold Friend" which he claims is his real name. Besides dressing and behaving like James Dean, he also name-drops several teenybopper acts, even though he appears to be in his thirties. Although he initially comes off as kind and friendly, he gradually adopts a sinister demeanor, alternating between speaking to Connie in a warm, seductive voice and shouting insults to his fellow car passenger when he inquires about a phone. Arnold informs Connie about how he has been watching her and that he knows all about her, recounting the details of her family's barbecue plans with startling accuracy. He then begins speaking about how he could be her lover. Connie orders him to leave, but he coerces her into going on a drive with him by threatening to burn down the house. His friend remains behind as they head off in his car.

When Connie returns home, she is bewildered and disheveled and informs Arnold that she never wants to see him again. When Connie's family returns from the barbecue, her mother tearfully apologizes to her for slapping her earlier that day, but Connie reassures her that everything is all right. She discreetly does not inform June about what happened, but dances with her to James Taylor's recording of the song "Handy Man".

== Cast ==
- Treat Williams as Arnold Friend
- Laura Dern as Connie Wyatt
- Mary Kay Place as Katherine Wyatt
- Elizabeth Berridge as June Wyatt
- Levon Helm as Harry Wyatt

In addition, Connie's friends are played by Margaret Welsh as Laura and Sara Inglis as Jill.

== Production ==
The short story "Where Are You Going, Where Have You Been?" by Joyce Carol Oates was adapted by playwright Tom Cole, Joyce Chopra's husband. Among the contributions Cole and Chopra added to the story was a fleshing out of the family relationships between Connie, her parents, and her sister. Laura Dern was not cast until two weeks before filming. Filming of Smooth Talk took place in northern California in the cities of Sebastopol and Santa Rosa.

== Reception ==
=== Box office ===
Goldcrest Films invested £516,000 in the film and received £635,000 earning them a profit of £119,000. It screened at the 1986 Sundance Film Festival where it won the Grand Jury Prize. The film was given a limited release in American theaters and continued to be unreleased on VHS and DVD for years thereafter due to going through different distributors.

=== Re-release ===
The film was given a 4K restoration by The Criterion Collection in September 2020 and was screened at the New York Film Festival that month to critical acclaim. Janus Films gave the film a general re-release that November.

=== Critical response ===
On the review aggregator website Rotten Tomatoes, 93% of 30 critics' reviews are positive, with an average rating of 7.2/10. The website's consensus reads: "Elevated by Laura Dern's haunting performance, Smooth Talk is far more than your average coming-of-age drama." Metacritic, which uses a weighted average, assigned the film a score of 74 out of 100, based on 13 critics, indicating "generally favorable" reviews. Roger Ebert, who awarded the film 3.5 stars out of 4, described it as "almost uncanny in its self-assurance".

Writing of the restored film, Richard Brody of The New Yorker said, "Chopra strikes an astoundingly tactile, intimate vision of Connie’s terror together with the burdens of self-doubt and silence that she endures—and that predators foster. The film’s power is enormous throughout; spare means (long-held close-ups, a four-minute take of sisterly confessions) evoke a drama that seems to have been filmed holding its breath."

Marshall Shaffer of Slant Magazine wrote "The film adequately recognizes the thin line between male seduction and coercion." Jake Cole, also of Slant, awarded the film 3.5 stars, saying "Dern nails the devastation of a woman learning how evil and exploitative the world of men can be, and just as David Lynch’s film [Blue Velvet] ended on a note of society's mask of civilized jollity reasserting itself in the face of deeper awareness, so, too, does Smooth Talk conclude with Connie, faced with no recourse to change anything, find a way to compartmentalize her rude awakening for the sake of survival."

== Home media ==
The film was released on DVD by MGM Home Entertainment on December 7, 2004. The film was released on Blu-ray for the first time by Olive Films on November 24, 2015. The Criterion Collection released a special edition Blu-ray and DVD of the film on February 23, 2021. The edition is a two-disc set which includes Chopra’s short films, retrospective interviews with the director and cast, and behind-the-scenes featurettes.

Awards
Preceded by Blood Simple	Sundance Grand Jury Prize: U.S. Dramatic; 1986	Succeeded by Waiting for the Moon
