= Epoch (American magazine) =

American literary magazine

- The cover of an Epoch magazine edition
- Editor: Michael Koch
- Categories: Literary magazine
- Frequency: Triannual
- Publisher: Cornell University
- Founded: 1947; 79 years ago
- Country: United States
- Based in: Ithaca, New York
- Language: English
- Website: www.epoch.cornell.edu
- ISSN: 0145-1391

Epoch is a triannual American literary magazine founded in 1947 and published by Cornell University. It has published well-known authors and award-winning work including stories reprinted in The Best American Short Stories series and poems later included in The Best American Poetry series. It publishes fiction, poetry, essays, graphic art, and sometimes cartoons and screenplays, but no literary criticism or book reviews.

Epoch is staffed by faculty and graduate students from the English Department creative writing program, and edited by Michael Koch. Epoch appears in September, January, and May, with issues generally running 128 to 160 pages.

== History ==
The magazine was established in 1947 by Baxter Hathaway, who arrived at Cornell University the year before to start a creative writing program. Initially, the magazine was a literary quarterly staffed by the English department.

A story from the magazine's first volume was reprinted in Best American Short Stories and all of the fiction from that volume was cited in the anthology. In the 1950s and 1960s, Epoch featured the first published fiction of Thomas Pynchon and Don DeLillo, and early stories by Philip Roth, Stanley Elkin, and Joyce Carol Oates.

Some other poets and writers who have appeared in the magazine are Jacob M. Appel, Annie Dillard, Rick DeMarinis, Jayne Anne Phillips, Andre Dubus, Amy Hempel, Lee K. Abbott, Charles Simic, Leslie Scalapino, Joel Lieber, Harriet Doerr, Denis Johnson, Ron Hansen, John L'Heureux, Jorie Graham, Micah Perks, and Rick Bass.

== Awards and recognition ==
The magazine claims that "all" the major anthologies have reproduced its work, including Best American Essays, The Pushcart Prize: Best of the Small Presses, Prize Stories: The O. Henry Awards, Editor's Choice Awards, Best of the West, and New Stories from the South. The periodical also won the first O. Henry Award for best magazine of 1997. Some stories from Epoch that have been reprinted in anthologies had been picked out of the slush pile by MFA students.

According to the Cornell Chronicle, Shannon Ravenel, editor of the anthology New Stories from the South: The Year's Best, said of Epoch, "It's the best. [...] Epoch is just consistently excellent."

C. Michael Curtis, a senior editor at The Atlantic Monthly, said he considers Epoch "one of the top literary magazines in the country in terms of the consistent quality of the writing that appears there." Curtis worked on the magazine staff as a graduate student from 1959 to 1963.
