= Foxfire: Confessions of a Girl Gang =

1993 novel by Joyce Carol Oates

- Cover of first edition, first printing (Dutton, 1993)
- Author: Joyce Carol Oates
- Language: English
- Genre: Novel
- Publisher: Dutton
- Publication date: 1993
- Publication place: United States
- Media type: Print (Hardback & Paperback)

Foxfire: Confessions of a Girl Gang is a novel by Joyce Carol Oates about a group of teenage girls in upstate New York in the 1950s who form a gang called Foxfire.

== Plot ==
The book takes the form of a memoir by Madeleine "Maddy" or "Monkey" Wirtz. Maddy is a fifty-year-old astronomer's assistant, but as a young girl was one of the five original members of Foxfire. This group included Betty "Goldie" Siegfried, Loretta "Lana" Maguire, Elizabeth "Rita" O'Hagan, and their leader, Margaret "Legs" Sadovsky. The girls all grew up together in the fictional town of Hammond, New York (the same setting Oates used for her 1990 novel Because It Is Bitter, and Because It Is My Heart).

Legs is an athletic, charismatic girl with feminist ideals about female pride and solidarity. She holds a Foxfire initiation ritual on January 1, 1953, involving secret tattoos of the gang's symbol, a red flame. Soon afterwards, Legs announces her first plan for the gang: the public humiliation of their high school math teacher. Mr. Buttinger has taken an inappropriate interest in Rita, often mocking her in class and requiring her to stay after school for "disciplinary" sessions where he gropes her breasts. This first Foxfire adventure is non-violent; the girls paint graffiti messages on Mr. Buttinger's car such as "I TEACH MATH & TICKLE TITS". His secret now public, Mr. Buttinger is openly laughed at in school and quickly retires from teaching altogether.

Encouraged by this first victory, Foxfire becomes increasingly bold in their activities. Although much of their early activities involve small-scale vandalism and shoplifting, they also brutally beat Maddy's uncle, Wimpy Wirtz, after he sexually assaults her and repeatedly cons her out of receiving his old typewriter. Yet Legs also insists that the gang take an interest in charity, anonymously donating money to needy people in their community. They also successfully protest a local pet shop to end the cruel treatment of the animals for sale there, in the process acquiring a "silvery-haired raccoon-faced husky" named Toby who becomes Foxfire's mascot.

Foxfire begins to gain attention in school and around town. Several other girls asked to join the gang. One day, Foxfire members are involved in a schoolyard fight with boys from another gang. The girls run from the school and wind up going for a joyride in a car they find left with the keys in the ignition. This leads to a police chase that ends in a crash for the Foxfire girls. None are seriously injured, but Legs is sent to Red Bank, a girls' correctional facility. The other Foxfire members involved in the incident are placed on probation.

Legs spends more than a year at Red Bank. After her release, Legs manages to rent an old house outside town and dubs it the "Foxfire Homestead". Most of the gang members move into the house, but they have difficulty earning enough money to support themselves with their legitimate jobs. The gang eventually begins stealing and extorting money from older men. Eventually, Legs comes up with a plan for the "final solution" of their financial problems: the kidnapping for ransom of a wealthy local man.

When the kidnapping plan goes wrong, it results in the breakup of the Foxfire gang and the mysterious disappearance of Legs herself.

== Films ==
The 1996 film version of Foxfire: Confessions of a Girl Gang, titled Foxfire, stars Angelina Jolie as Legs. The film differs from the novel in many ways, most notably the change of setting from 1950s upstate New York to the Pacific Northwest in the 1990s. In the film, most of the Foxfire members come from comfortable suburban families; in the novel, they are working class girls from the "wrong side of the tracks" whose families suffer from domestic problems such as child abuse and alcoholism. The novel also covers a period of about three and a half years, while the film's action takes place during the course of a few weeks.

Another adaption of the novel, Foxfire: Confessions of a Girl Gang, stars Raven Adamson as Legs, and directed by French director Laurent Cantet, was released in Europe in December 2012 and has been cited as being a more faithful adaptation of the book.
