= A Garden of Earthly Delights =

1967 novel by Joyce Carol Oates

- First edition
- Author: Joyce Carol Oates
- Language: English
- Series: The Wonderland Quartet
- Genre: Naturalist novel
- Published: 1967 (Vanguard Press)
- Publication place: United States
- Media type: Print (hardback & paperback)
- Pages: 440 pp
- Followed by: Expensive People

A Garden of Earthly Delights is a novel by Joyce Carol Oates, published by Vanguard in 1967. Her second book published, it is the first in her "Wonderland Quartet" followed by Expensive People (1968), them (1969), and Wonderland (1971). It was a finalist for the 1968 annual U.S. National Book Award for Fiction.

A Garden sets out to explore social class in the United States and the inner lives of its youngsters. It follows heroine Clara Walpole, the beautiful daughter of a Kentucky-born migrant farmer. The novel explores Clara's ill-fated life and the four men who shaped it: Clara's father, a bitter, hard-working farm worker; Lowry, who whisks the teenage Clara away and tempts her with love; Revere, a wealthy married businessman who gives Clara stability; and Swan, Clara's son who carries the physiological burden of Clara’s determination to escape her haphazard existence of violence and poverty. In an attempt to rise above her mother's ambitions, Clara struggles for independence by way of her relationships with the four different men in her life.

For the 2003 Modern Library edition of the novel, Oates revised three quarters of the original published text.

== Summary ==
=== I. Carleton ===
Carleton Walpole is a migrant worker, traveling with his family from camp to camp looking for work during the Great Depression. One day the truck breaks down, and as they wait for repairs his wife, Pearl, gives birth to a daughter whom they name Clara. Carleton is an arrogant, vain man who later kills a man by accident in a bar. The family moves to avoid the police. Pearl dies in childbirth a few years later, and Carleton takes up with a woman named Nancy. Clara goes to school, though she does not excel, and Carleton favors her out of all his children. One day when Clara is a teenager, she receives a visit from two women from the First Methodist Church in Florence. They invite her to a prayer meeting at their church that evening, which Clara accepts. The meeting at the church disturbs Clara, and she leaves early with a young man named LeRoy and they go to a restaurant. At the restaurant she meets another man named Lowry, and she goes home with Lowry, though he declines to sleep with her. When she comes back home that evening, Carleton begins to beat her. The next morning, Clara finds Lowry again and leaves town with him. Carleton sets out to look for her, but never finds her and succumbs to an unidentified illness.

=== II. Lowry ===
Lowry does not seem to live anywhere, but travels from town to town. He explains that his parents lost everything in the Depression, so he is afraid to possess anything. They eventually settle in a town called Tintern, and he gets her a small room and a job at a Five and Dime. She repeatedly professes her love for Lowry, but he insists on treating her like a sister, and she jealously observes him going off with other women. Clara has a friend named Caroline who marries a man named Davey. Davey works a farm owned by a wealthy man named Curt Revere.

As Clara walks back from their wedding, a man offers her a ride, and he turns out to be Revere himself. One summer Lowry begins sleeping with her. He tells her to use birth control but she does not. She meets Revere again and he oddly compares her to a Swedish girl he once met near a farm. Lowry suddenly shows up at her room one night, saying he is in trouble and he must flee for Mexico.

=== III. Revere ===
Revere comes across her again and takes her to an abandoned farmhouse he owns, where they make love. Revere provides for her in the farmhouse, coming every few days when he isn't with his wife Marguerite. At age seventeen Clara gives birth to a boy. Revere assumes the boy is his, but Clara knows it is Lowry's. They name the boy Steven, but Clara calls him Swan. When Swan is an infant, Lowry comes to the farmhouse and asks Clara to take Swan and go with him to Canada. Clara refuses, saying she is waiting for Marguerite to die so that she can marry Revere and be prosperous. Lowry leaves, but Swan later realizes that this man is his father.

Clara eventually marries Revere and they move into his house, when Swan is seven years old.

=== IV. Swan ===
Revere adopts Swan, whose name is changed to “Steven Revere,” and he meets Revere's three sons: Clark, Jonathan, and Robert. Clara vainly buys many expensive items and decorations for their home, knowing that Revere has no end of money. Robert and Jonathan pick on Swan, although Clark, the oldest, is mature and kind. On a hunting trip that Swan despises, Swan pushes Robert and accidentally makes Robert's gun go off, killing the youth. Everyone accepts his death as an accident. Jonathan gradually becomes less responsible and more delinquent, while Swan excels in school and skips a grade.

Swan refuses to go to college in spite of his excellent grades, and he breaks off a relationship he has with a girl named Loretta because he is afraid of the carnal sins that his mother warned him against. Eventually Swan becomes Revere's assistant in the business, since Clark has married a lower-class girl and has fallen out of Revere's favor. Swan becomes depressed and finds his attention drifting from everything he does. Swan is in love with a niece of Revere's, Deb, who is married to another man. One night Swan goes to Revere's and Clara's house, yelling that he cannot stand the couple any more. Swan pulls out a gun and tries to kill Clara, only to find he cannot do it. Swan accidentally shoots Revere and then kills himself. Clara has a nervous breakdown and spends the rest of her life in a nursing home. She is visited on occasion only by Clark.

== Title ==
The title of the novel is taken from the painting The Garden of Earthly Delights, by Hieronymus Bosch.

Richard Fusco of America magazine observed,

"Instead of moving from Eden through earth to hell, as in the painting, Oates's protagonist travels from the hell of a migrant camp through an uncertain existence where joys are imagined, to an economic and social Eden, represented by Curt Revere's farm. But as was true in the painting, this garden cultivates the seeds of its own destruction."

Susana Araújo wrote,

"According to Foucault, the garden is the oldest example of heterotopia--a space that allows for the juxtaposition of several incompatible sites within a single real place. He mentions the rectangular Persian garden as a microcosm that brought together within it four spaces representing the four parts of the world."

== Reception and interpretation ==
In an essay that analyses the "grotesque vision" of Oates's works, Kathleen Burke Bloom observes, "Oates endows her characters with survival skills that metastasize into the obsessions that ultimately destroy them," and concludes, "That the Walpole clan's progression runs full circle from the depths of misery to great heights of satisfaction and back down to misery, greatly intensifies the grotesque effect of the novel."

Entela Kushta laments, "Clara's ties, in fact, are not to the family or to the land, as might be expected in a novel about rural families; her only concern is for herself. Like Karen Herz, Clara is seeking to break away from her family to starting a new life in the chaotic world of 20th century America."

The Kirkus Reviews calls it "A wrenching delineation of the culture of poverty—and how it shapes and circumscribes character."
