= A Sentimental Education (short stories) =

1980 collection of stories by Joyce Carol Oates

- First edition
- Author: Joyce Carol Oates
- Language: English
- Genre: Short story collection
- Publisher: E. P. Dutton
- Publication date: 1980
- Publication place: United States
- Media type: Print (hardback)
- Pages: 196
- ISBN: 978-0525199502

A Sentimental Education is a collection of five short stories and a novella by Joyce Carol Oates published in 1980 by E. P. Dutton.

== Stories ==
All of the stories in the collection were previously published:

- "Queen of the Night" (limited edition by Lord John Press, 1979)
- "The Precipice" (Mississippi Review, Winter/Spring 1979)
- "The Tryst" (The Atlantic, August 1976)
- "A Middle-Class Education" (limited edition by Albondocani Press, 1980)
- "In the Autumn of the Year" (Bennington Review, April 1978)
- "A Sentimental Education" (novella; limited edition by Sylvester & Orphanos, 1978; as Sentimental Education)

== Reception ==
Kirkus Reviews registers impatience with Oates's literary style, her "emptily elaborate prose" and her narratives which invariably "lapse into her standard grisly agenda." The review limits its approval to one story, "The Autumn of the Year", in which a young man brutally chastises his father's former mistress for destroying his life and his mother's. A Sentimental Education is rated "a disappointing collection from a gifted, epically erratic writer."

Literary critic Robert Keily in The New York Times emphasizes the demoralized condition of the characters in these stories, evidenced by speaking in an exhausted vernaculars – "mouthing futile cliche after futile cliche" – and whose behaviors amount to "collections of compulsions."

Praising Oates for the "authenticity of her inventions", Keily offers this caveat regarding the theme of the volume:

In her stories, there is an American profile: design but no beauty, clearsightedness but no vision, energy but no purpose. If such fiction appears to be an exercise in collective self-hatred, she may well have captured the spirit of the land.

== Sources ==
- Johnson, Greg (1994). Joyce Carol Oates: a study of the short fiction. Twayne's studies in short fiction. New York: Twayne publ. ISBN 978-0-8057-0857-8.
- Keily, Robert. 1981. "An American Voice" The New York Times, January 4, 1981. https://archive.nytimes.com/www.nytimes.com/books/98/07/05/specials/oates-education.html Retrieved 10 November 2023.
- Kirkus Review. 1980. Bookshelf; "Sentimental Education" Kirkus Reviews, 1980. https://www.kirkusreviews.com/book-reviews/joyce-carol-oates/sentimental-education/ Retrieved 11 November 2023.
- Lercangee, Francine. 1986. Joyce Carol Oates: An Annotated Bibliography. Garland Publishing, New York and London. ISBN 0-8240-8908-1
- Oates, Joyce Carol. 1993. A Sentimental Education. E. P. Dutton, New York.ISBN 978-0525199502
