= Antaeus (magazine) =

Defunct American literary magazine (1970-1994)

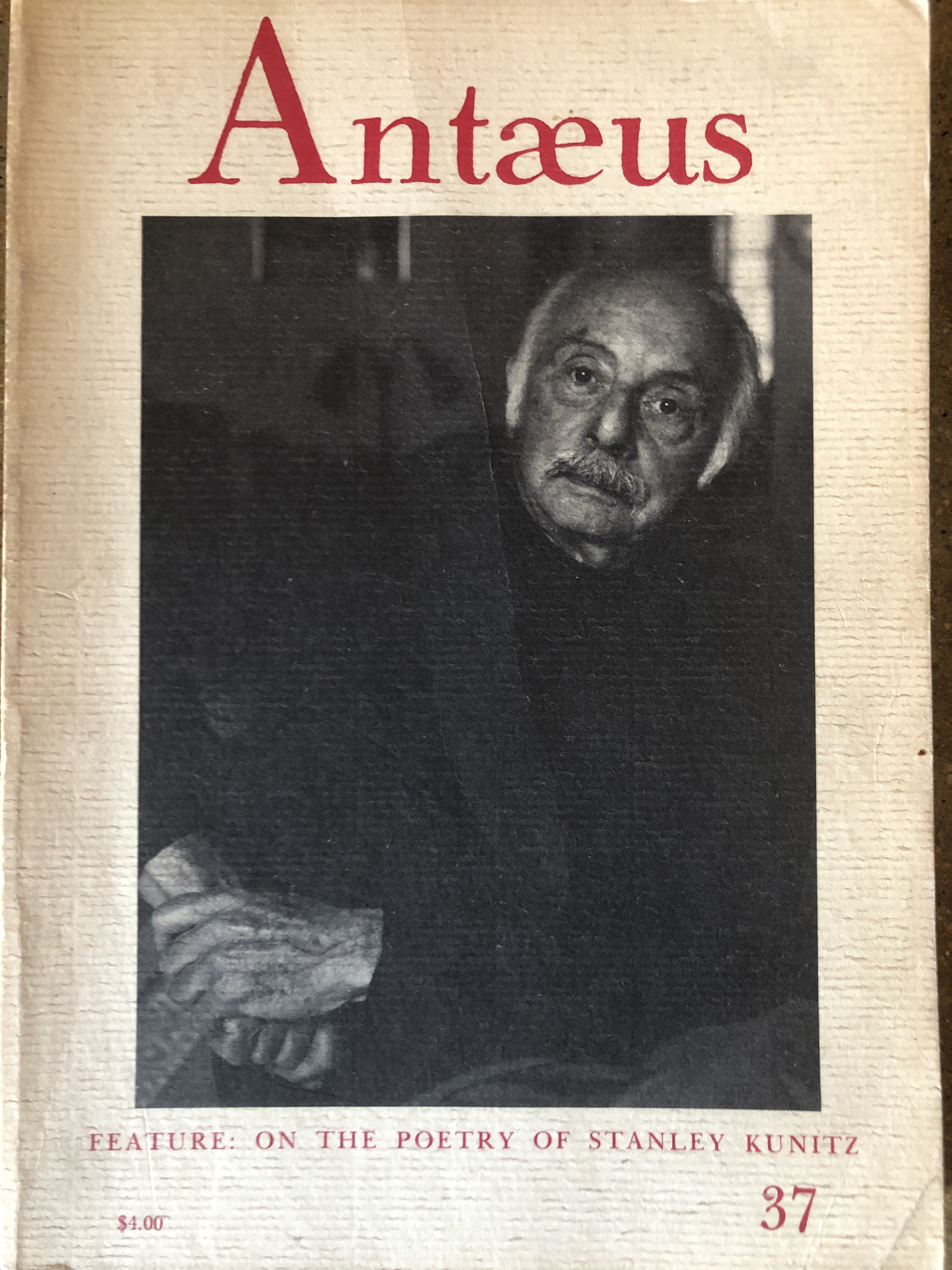
- Issue 37 (Spring 1980) cover, featuring National Book Award winner Stanley Kunitz
- Editor: Daniel Halpern
- Categories: Literary magazine
- Founder: Daniel Halpern and Paul Bowles
- Founded: 1970
- First issue: Summer 1970
- Final issue: Autumn 1994
- Company: Ecco Press
- Country: United States
- Based in: New York City
- Language: English

Antaeus was an American quarterly literary magazine founded by Daniel Halpern and Paul Bowles and edited by Halpern. The magazine was published between 1970 and 1994.

== History ==
In 1969, Paul Bowles, an expatriate novelist and composer living in Tangier, Morocco, Africa, conceived the magazine.

In 1970, Daniel Halpern, working with Bowles, founded the magazine, which was initially published in Tangier, Morocco, Africa, with the first numbered issue appearing that summer.

Beginning with the third issue, the magazine spawned and thereafter bore the imprint of the Ecco Press, which eventually became established as a book publisher. Ecco Press eventually became an imprint of HarperCollins.

A small number of limited editions were also issued in conjunction with the magazine under the imprint of Antaeus Editions.

In the mid-1980s, operations were shifted to New York City, New York, United States, North America.

In 1994, the final issue (#75/76) was published.

== Contributors ==
Particularly in its early years, Antaeus was known for its internationalist scope.

Among its notable contributors were:

- W.H. Auden
- J. G. Ballard
- Paul Bowles
- Guy Davenport
- Stephen King
- Harry Mathews
- John D. MacDonald "Wedding Present" Spring, 1977
- Joyce Carol Oates
- Breece D'J Pancake
- Yannis Ritsos
- Leslie Marmon Silko
- Andrew Vachss
- Tennessee Williams

== See also ==
- List of literary magazines

== Bibliography ==
- Davenport, Guy (1987). Every Force Evolves A Form. San Francisco [CA]: North Point Press. ISBN 0-86547-247-5. "[The essays] 'Balthu' and 'What Are Those Monkeys Doing?' (under the title 'Rousseau') [were published] in Antaeus."
