= Expensive People =

1968 novel by Joyce Carol Oates

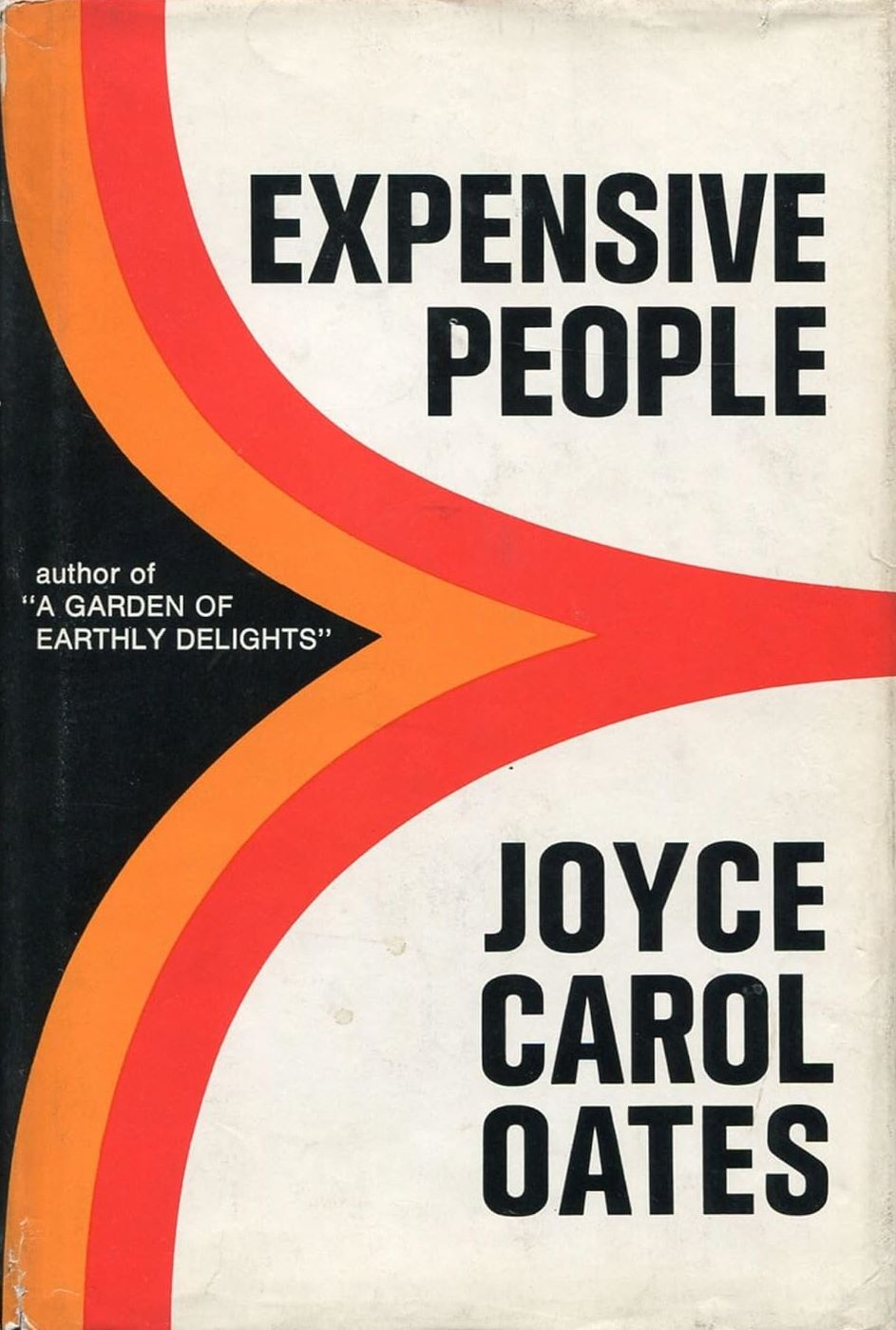
- First Edition
- Author: Joyce Carol Oates
- Language: English
- Genre: novel
- Publisher: Vanguard Press
- Publication date: 1968
- Publication place: United States
- Media type: Print (hardback)
- Pages: 308
- ISBN: 978-0814901700

Expensive People is a novel by Joyce Carol Oates first published in 1968 by Vanguard Press. A Fawcett Publications paperback edition was issued in 1974.

The novel is the second in Oates's Wonderland Quartet including A Garden of Earthly Delights (1967), them (1969), and Wonderland.

== Plot ==
Expensive People is told by an unreliable first-person narrator, the eighteen-year-old Richard Everett, who opens his "memoir" with the entry: "I was a child murderer."

== Reception ==
New York Times literary critic John Knowles congratulates Joyce Carol Oates for undertaking a project fraught with "technical problems" that challenge "her literary imagination and her talent," but with some success. The use of a first-person confessional narrative Mr. Knowles regards as a "powerful and tricky concoction." The novel's narrator, the 18-year-old and self-confessed murderer, Richard Everett, "digresses to give us his views on art, writing, imagery, puns, you, me, and so on." The reviewer confesses, self-mockingly, that the precocious protagonist wrote his review.

== Retrospective appraisal ==
In tone and style, Expensive People is a "striking departure" from Oates's fiction to that date. Abandoning the third-person omniscient examination the focal character, the novel is postmodernist, presented as a memoir by an unreliable narrator.

Literary critic Greg Johnson identifies the novel as a "contemporary Gothic satire" in the style of Vladimir Nabokov (author of Lolita (1955), and an "exploration of American culture." Johnson remarks on the comic elements of the novel:

On a purely literary plane, the novel parodies the memoir, literary criticism, and especially the traditions of the realistic novel and the "unreliable narrator" itself - even as it partakes of all these. Johnson reminds readers that the experimental aspects of the novel include autobiographical references to Oates's physical appearance and family history.

== Theme ==
Terming the novel a "naturalist allegory" and a "tour-de-force," biographer Joanne V. Creighton locates its thematic center:

Rather than a piece of naturalistic realism like her other novels, Expensive People is a masterful satire of both literary and suburban conventions. At the core of the novel is Oates's questioning - at once playful and probing - of the elusive nature of both life and art.

Oates goes so far with self-parody as to portray her protagonist consulting and critiquing one of her essays, "Building Tension in the Short Story" (The Writer, June 1966).

== Sources ==
- Creighton, Joanne V. 1979. Joyce Carol Oates. Twayne Publishers, New York. Warren G. French, editor. ISBN 0-8057-7212-X
- Johnson, Greg. 1987. Understanding Joyce Carol Oates. University of South Carolina Press, Columbia, South Carolina. ISBN 0-87249-524-8
- Johnson, Greg. 1994. Joyce Carol Oates: A Study of the Short Fiction. Twayne's studies in short fiction; no. 57. Twayne Publishers, New York. ISBN 0-8057-0857-X
- Knowles, John. 1997. "Nada at the Core" The New York Times, November 3, 1968. Nada at the Core Accessed January 15, 2025.
- Oates, Joyce Carol. 1968. Expensive People. Vanguard Press, New York. ISBN 978-0814901700
