= Lovely, Dark, Deep: Stories =

Short fiction collection by Joyce Carol Oates

Lovely, Dark, Deep
- First edition
- Author: Joyce Carol Oates
- Language: English
- Publisher: Ecco/HarperCollins
- Publication date: 2014
- Publication place: United States
- Media type: Print (hardback)
- Pages: 432
- ISBN: 978-0-06-235694-9

Lovely, Dark, Deep: Stories is collection of short fiction by Joyce Carol Oates published in 2014 by Ecco/HarperCollins. The volume comprises twelve short stories and a novella, "Patricide".

The titular story "Love, Dark, Deep" provoked controversy for its negative depiction of American poet Robert Frost.

== Stories ==
I

- "Sex with Camel" (The American Reader, May/June 2013)
- "Mastiff" (The New Yorker, June 24, 2013)
- "Distance" (Ploughshares, Spring 2010)
- "A Book of Martyrs" (Virginia Quarterly Review, Fall 2012)
- "Stephanos is Dead" Yale Review, 21 December 2012)

II

- "The Hunter" (Boulevard)
- "The Disappearing" (American Short Fiction, Fall 2013)
- "Things Passed on the Way to Oblivion" (Salmagundi, Fall 2014)

III

- "Forked River Roadside Shrine, New Jersey" (Vice, June 11, 2013)
- "The Jesters" (Virginia Quarterly Review, Summer 2013)
- "Betrayal" (Conjunctions, Spring 2013)
- "Lovely, Dark, Deep" (Harper's Magazine, November 2013)

IV

- "Patricide" ([EccoSolo ebook), July 3, 2012)

== Reception ==
Literary critic Charles Finch at the New York Times describes the collection as "a fatally slack enterprise, a makeshift heap of first drafts, blighted by shallow emotion. I winced again and again as I read it." Finch adds: "Wallace Stegner liked to say hard writing makes for easy reading; this feels like easy writing, and it makes for hard reading."

Remarking on the scope of Oates's fiction, Alan Cheuse at NPR radio compares her to the 19th century novelist Honoré de Balzac: "Where Balzac wanted to give his readers Paris in its entirety, Joyce Carol Oates has dared to give her readers an entire country — our own."

Kirkus Reviews writes: "As unsympathetic as many of Oates' mordant and quasi-anonymous characters may appear at first, en masse their fears and anxieties in the face of death and decline epitomize universal recognition of hard facts: We're all in this together, and nobody gets out alive."

=== Robert Frost controversy ===
The title of the titular story of the collection "Lovely, Dark, Deep" is based on a verse from the famous poem by Robert Frost (1874–1963) entitled "Stopping by Woods on a Snowy Evening" (1922). The final stanza reads:

The woods are lovely, dark and deep,

But I have promises to keep,
And miles to go before I sleep,

And miles to go before I sleep.

In Oates's story, a fictional female journalist, Evangeline Fife, goes to interview Frost in the summer of 1951, then at the height of his prestige. Oates depicts the former Vermont poet laureate as a sexist and a racist, according to Liz Bury at The Guardian.

Bury notes: "Frost's wife, Elinor, his sister, Jeanie, and his children Irma, Lesley, Marjorie, and Carol all feature in the fiction, with Oates making no attempt to disguise the identity of her subjects." Kirkus Reviews writes: "The collection's titular story delivers a skewering of Robert Frost in its unsympathetic riff on the facts of the poet's life as well as a testimonial to the role of the poet's craft as a hedge against mortality."

Oates provided a caveat in a footnote to opening page of the story which reads: "This is a work of fiction, though based on (selected) historical research," adding "See Robert Frost: A Biography (1996) by Jeffrey Meyers."

== Sources ==
- Bury, Liz. 2013. Joyce Carol Oates attacked for 'distasteful' portrayal of Robert Frost. The Guardian, November 1, 2013. https://www.theguardian.com/books/2013/nov/01/joyce-carol-oates-robert-frost-lovely-dark-deep Accessed 5 March 2025.
- Cheuse, Alan. 2014. "Oates' Latest Story Collection Is 'Dark, Deep' And Marvelous." National Public Radio. September 10, 1014. https://www.npr.org/2014/09/10/343144939/oates-latest-story-collection-is-dark-deep-and-marvelous Accessed 5 March 2025.
- Finch, Charles. 2014, "Mortal Coil." New York Times, October 3, 2014.https://www.nytimes.com/2014/10/05/books/review/lovely-dark-deep-by-joyce-carol-oates.html Accessed 5 March 2025.
- Oates, Joyce Carol. 2014. Lovely, Dark, Deep: Stories. Ecco/HarperCollins, New York. ISBN 978-0-06-235694-9
