= Foxfire (1996 film) =

- Theatrical release poster
- Directed by: Annette Haywood-Carter
- Screenplay by: Elizabeth White
- Based on: Foxfire: Confessions of a Girl Gang by Joyce Carol Oates
- Produced by: Jeffrey Lurie; John Bard Manulis; John P. Marsh
- Starring: Hedy Burress; Angelina Jolie; Jenny Lewis; Jenny Shimizu; Cathy Moriarty
- Cinematography: Newton Thomas Sigel
- Edited by: Louise Innes
- Music by: Michel Colombier
- Production companies: Rysher Entertainment; Chestnut Hill Productions; Red Mullet Productions
- Distributed by: The Samuel Goldwyn Company
- Release date: August 23, 1996 (United States)
- Running time: 102 minutes
- Country: United States
- Language: English
- Box office: $269,300

Foxfire is a 1996 American teen drama film directed by Annette Haywood-Carter. Based on the Joyce Carol Oates novel Foxfire: Confessions of a Girl Gang, it examines the coming of age of four high school girls who meet up with a mysterious and beautiful drifter.

== Plot ==
Maddie Wirtz is a high school senior living in the suburbs of Portland, Oregon. Her plans to coast through her last school year before college are waylaid when she meets another teenage girl, "Legs," a drifter who takes shelter from the rain inside Maddie's school. The same day she meets them, Legs convinces Maddie and fellow students Rita Faldes and Violet Kahn to confront Mr. Buttinger, a teacher who has been sexually harassing Rita and Violet. Maddie, Rita, and Violet flee after the confrontation turns violent, witnessed by student Goldie Goldman, who flees with them. Later, Legs finds Maddie at her house from the address in a notebook Maddie dropped in Mr. Buttinger's classroom. Legs spends the night at Maddie's house and bonds with her further in the morning before school.

At school, Maddie, Rita, Violet, and Goldie are suspended for the confrontation with Mr. Buttinger, despite their explanation of what happened. After getting kicked out of school, the girls go to an abandoned house where Maddie suggested Legs stay, finding Legs there. All five girls quickly form a close bond, with the abandoned house as their "headquarters" and engaging in further acts of rebellion, such as breaking into the school to retrieve part of Maddie's art school application (which the principal refused to let her get before she got kicked out) and Legs tattooing a flame on all of them. Legs and Maddie also learn Goldie's father physically abuses her. Everything culminates when the girls crash a car stolen from a group of boys who were about to rape Maddie in "revenge" for what happened to Mr. Buttinger.

Though not seriously injured, the girls go on trial for stealing the car, with the boys and one of their girlfriends, Cindy, lying about the events leading up to it. Legs is sent to a juvenile prison and the group flounders without her, with Goldie starting to use heroin. Eventually, Cindy, feeling guilty, tells the judge the truth, leading to Legs' release.

The girls' reunion is tempered by Legs learning of Goldie's addiction; Maddie has taken her to the abandoned house to detox. To help her, Legs leads Maddie, Rita, and Violet to Goldie's house to demand $10,000 from her parents to send Goldie to rehab. The situation escalates when Goldie's father refuses and Legs, holding him at gunpoint, forces the others to take him to the abandoned house. He is tied to a chair while the girls try to think of what to do next, and the tension rises as Legs begins taking her own paternal frustrations out on him. Amid the chaos, Rita accidentally shoots Goldie's father in the shoulder.

Panic ensues and the girls resolve to get Goldie's father to the hospital. When Goldie, Rita, and Violet leave with Goldie's father, Maddie realizes Legs is missing. She finds Legs walking along the bridge, looking for a ride to another town. Both girls make proposals, Maddie for Legs to stay with her and the others and Legs for Maddie to join her on the road. Sad but resolute, the two eventually go their separate ways. Legs gets a truck to stop and boards as Maddie watches it disappear.

In a voice-over, it is revealed that Maddie reunited with her boyfriend, finished high school, and went on to attend art school in New York City. She travels the world, always stopping at airports and bus stops along the way. Although none of the group ever see Legs again, they still get together once in a while and strengthen their bond over the past.

== Cast ==
- Hedy Burress as Madeline "Maddie" Wirtz
- Angelina Jolie as Margaret "Legs" Sadovsky
- Jenny Lewis as Rita Faldes
- Jenny Shimizu as "Goldie" Goldman
- Cathy Moriarty as Martha Wirtz
- Sarah Rosenberg as Violet Kahn
- Michelle Brookhurst as Cindy
- Dash Mihok as Dana Taylor
- Peter Facinelli as Ethan Bixby
- Richard Beymer as Mr. Parks
- Fran Bennett as Judge Holifield
- John Diehl as Mr. Buttinger
- Chris Mulkey as Dan Goldman
- Jay Acovone as Chuck

== Production ==
The film was shot in Portland, Oregon.

== Reception ==
On the review aggregator website Rotten Tomatoes, 50% of 16 critics' reviews are positive.
