= The Man Without a Shadow =

2016 novel by Joyce Carol Oates

- First edition
- Author: Joyce Carol Oates
- Language: English
- Publisher: Ecco Press
- Publication date: 2016
- Publication place: United States
- Media type: Print (hardback)
- Pages: 284
- ISBN: 978-0-06-241609-4

The Man Without a Shadow is a novel by Joyce Carol Oates published in 2016 by Ecco Press.

== Reception ==
Calling The Man Without a Shadow "remarkably unusual and haunting," literary critic Eric K. Anderson at Bearing Witness: Joyce Carol Oates Studies writes:

The Man Without a Shadow is a triumphantly successful novel that makes original connections between science's mission to comprehend the elusive mechanics of the mind and the humanities' exploration of the manifestations of love.

New York Times critic Leah Hager Cohen reports that The Man Without a Shadow is "uncomfortable reading" in both its narrative and thematic scope. Acknowledging Oates's audacity in portraying "violence, betrayal and shame, sexual and otherwise," Cohen questions her treatment of these topics: "It's as if this material mesmerizes her so utterly that it impedes the full range of her power to interrogate it..."

Reviewer Jeff Robson at The Independent notes "A moving climax proves that, unlike her protagonists, Oates' talents and perceptions remain unimpaired."

== Sources ==
- Anderson, Eric K. 2016. "Review of Joyce Carol Oates's The Man Without a Shadow," Bearing Witness: Joyce Carol Oates Studies: Vol. 3, Article 1. https://repository.usfca.edu/cgi/viewcontent.cgi?article=1019&context=jcostudies Accessed 25 March 2025.
- Cohen, Leah Hager. 2016. 'The Man Without a Shadow,' by Joyce Carol Oates. New York Times, February 12, 2016. https://www.nytimes.com/2016/02/14/books/review/the-man-without-a-shadow-by-joyce-carol-oates.html Accessed 24 March 2025.
- Oates, Joyce Carol. 2016. The Man Without a Shadow. Ecco Press, New York. ISBN 978-0-06-241609-4
- Robson, Jeff. 2016. "The Man without a Shadow by Joyce Carol Oates - book review: A melancholy mystery that lives in the memory." The Independent, February 15, 2016.https://www.the-independent.com/arts-entertainment/books/reviews/the-man-without-a-shadow-by-joyce-carol-oates-book-review-a-melancholy-mystery-that-lives-in-the-memory-a6875621.html Accessed 19 March 2025.
