= I'll Take You There (novel) =

2002 novel by Joyce Carol Oates

- First edition
- Author: Joyce Carol Oates
- Cover artist: Balthus, "Patience", 1955
- Language: English
- Publisher: Ecco Press
- Publication date: 2002
- Publication place: United States
- Media type: Print (Paperback)
- Pages: 304
- ISBN: 978-0-06-050117-4

I'll Take You There is a 2002 novel by Joyce Carol Oates published by Ecco Press.

== Genre ==
The book can be categorized as belonging to the tradition of the Bildungsroman, in which a sensitive person is growing up or "coming of age" and searches of answers to life's questions with the expectation that these will result from gaining experience of the world.

== Plot ==
I'll Take You There consists of three parts, in which the female narrator, originating from a poor, migrant and blue collar family from Strykersville, New York, describes her experiences as an outsider in an upper class sisterhood in Syracuse, New York (part one); her experiences of a lover with a different ethnic (Afro-American) background (part two); and finally her coming to terms with her family background (part three).

The nameless narrator—by her family only called 'you', by her lover called by the pseudonym 'Anellia'—joins a sorority in Syracuse, New York. Soon enough, she crumbles under the exorbitant debt she runs up. Finally, she pretends she indulges in irrational behavior to get out of the sorority and move into affordable accommodation elsewhere on campus.

She falls for a black student who audits her philosophy lectures. After she stalks him for a while, they sleep together. Eventually, she learns that he is married and has left his wife and children.

She drives to Crescent, Utah to meet her dying father. After his death, he bequeaths his money to her, but she decides to give it to his mistress. She buries him in Strykersville, New York, as he requested.

== Characters ==
- Anellia, a fake name the protagonist takes; an undergraduate student.
- Dietrich, Fritz, Hendrick, her brothers.
- Ida, her dead mother.
- Erich, the father. He works in the West of the United States.
- Mrs Agnes Thayer, the housemother at the sorority who at first seems to run the house with an iron fist and then loses control over it. She is British; her sister is from Leeds.
- Vernor Matheius, her black lover.
- Hildie Pomeroy, her father's mistress.

== Allusions to other works ==
- The novel starts with an epitaph from Ludwig Wittgenstein's Philosophical Investigations.
- Philosophy is mentioned with Spinoza, Nietzsche, Hegel, Descartes, David Hume, Plato, Aristotle, Saint Augustine, Francis Bacon, Voltaire, Immanuel Kant, Wittgenstein, Cassirer, Thomas Aquinas, Leibniz, Locke, Democritus, Bertrand Russell, and Pascal.
- Literature is mentioned with James Joyce, Franz Kafka, Walter Scott, Edward Gibbon, William Shakespeare, and Milton's Paradise Lost.
- Music is mentioned with Liszt and Schopenhauer.
- Painting is mentioned with Edward Hopper and Salvador Dalí.

== Allusions to actual history ==
- The Civil Rights Movement is mentioned through the character of Vernor Matheius.
