= Carthage (novel) =

2014 novel by Joyce Carol Oates

- First edition
- Author: Joyce Carol Oates
- Language: English
- Genre: Gothic
- Publisher: Ecco Press
- Publication date: 2014
- Publication place: United States
- Media type: Print (hardback)
- Pages: 496
- ISBN: 978-0062208125

Carthage is a novel by Joyce Carol Oates published in 2014 by Ecco Press.

== Plot ==
In the small town of Carthage, New York, pillars of the community Zeno Mayfield and his wife Arlette are distraught when their daughter Cressida goes missing in The Preserve, a wilderness area near the town. Cressida ("the smart one") has for years had a difficult relationship with her sister Juliet ("the pretty one") and with their parents; despite being a gifted artist she is also erratic, impulsive, unreliable, and intensely alienated from everyone around her. The last person Cressida was seen with was Juliet's fiance, Brett Kincaid; they were drinking at a local tavern and Cressida was observed getting into his car. Kincaid, who has recently returned from a tour in Iraq, is recovering from serious physical injuries but is also suffering from severe PTSD and traumatic brain injury. As a result his memory is fragmented and faulty, occasionally throwing up images of horrific events he may or may not have witnessed in Iraq, and when the local police pressure him he confesses to Cressida's murder, believing that he must have done so despite the fact her body was never found. The book traces the impact of Cressida's disappearance and Brett's confession on everyone involved—including Cressida herself, who it transpires is not dead but has started a new life in Florida under another name.

By the end of the novel, we see that all of its younger protagonists are in search of a transformation that...will carry them through some profound blackness before returning them, absolved of some unspecified guilt, to their original places in the world. This process could be called redemption, but redemption can only be won by the expiation, not only of one's own sins, but also of those of the fathers...Carthage...is a profound and poignant vision of American guilt, and its potential for some kind of absolution.

== Reception ==
Reviewer Dwight Garner at the New York Times considered Oates guilty of formulaic writing with regard to setting, genre, detail, and a narrative and “obsessed with violence and sex-shame.” Garner found that Oates's characters resemble those found on TV soap operas and consequently “d]ifficult to take seriously, because they often speak in dialogue that could have been lifted from a script for Days of Our Lives, circa 1974.”

Literary critic Eric Karl Anderson at the Lonesome Reader described the scope of Oates's novel as “a dramatic, extraordinary story that explores large subjects like the Iraq war, the American penitentiary system, alcoholism and spousal abuse”. Anderson added: “This is the kind of book that reminds me how potent storytelling can be. It’s an impressive accomplishment.”

== Theme ==
Literary critic John Burnside at The Guardian referenced the epigraph to Carthage, concerning the redemption of the murderer Raskolnikov in Fyodor Dostoevsky’s famous novel Crime and Punishment (1866): The epigraph describes Sonya’s exhortation to Raskolnikov to confess his guilt for murdering two women:

Go at once, this very minute, stand at the cross-roads, bow down, first kiss the earth which you have defiled and then bow down to all the world and say to all men, “I am a murderer!” Then God will send you life again.”

Burnside noted: “At its Dostoevsky-inspired conclusion, Carthage…attains a profound and poignant vision of American guilt, and its potential for some kind of absolution.”

== Sources ==
- Anderson, Eric Karl. 2024. “Carthage by Joyce Carol Oates". Lonesome Reader, February 17, 2024. Carthage by Joyce Carol Oates Accessed 14 March 2025.
- Burnside, John. 2014. “Carthage by Joyce Carol Oates–review.” The Guardian, January 31, 2014. Carthage by Joyce Carol Oates – review Accessed 16 March 2025.
- Garner, Dwight. 2014. “Missing Sprite Leaves Only Her Shadow.” New York Times, Books of the Times. February 5, 2014. Missing Sprite Leaves Only Her Shadow (Published 2014) Accessed 10 March 2025.
- Oates, Joyce Carol. 2020. Cardiff, by the Sea: Four Novellas of Suspense. The Mysterious Press, New York. ISBN 978-0-8021-5799-7
