= Imani Perry =

American interdisciplinary scholar (born 1972)

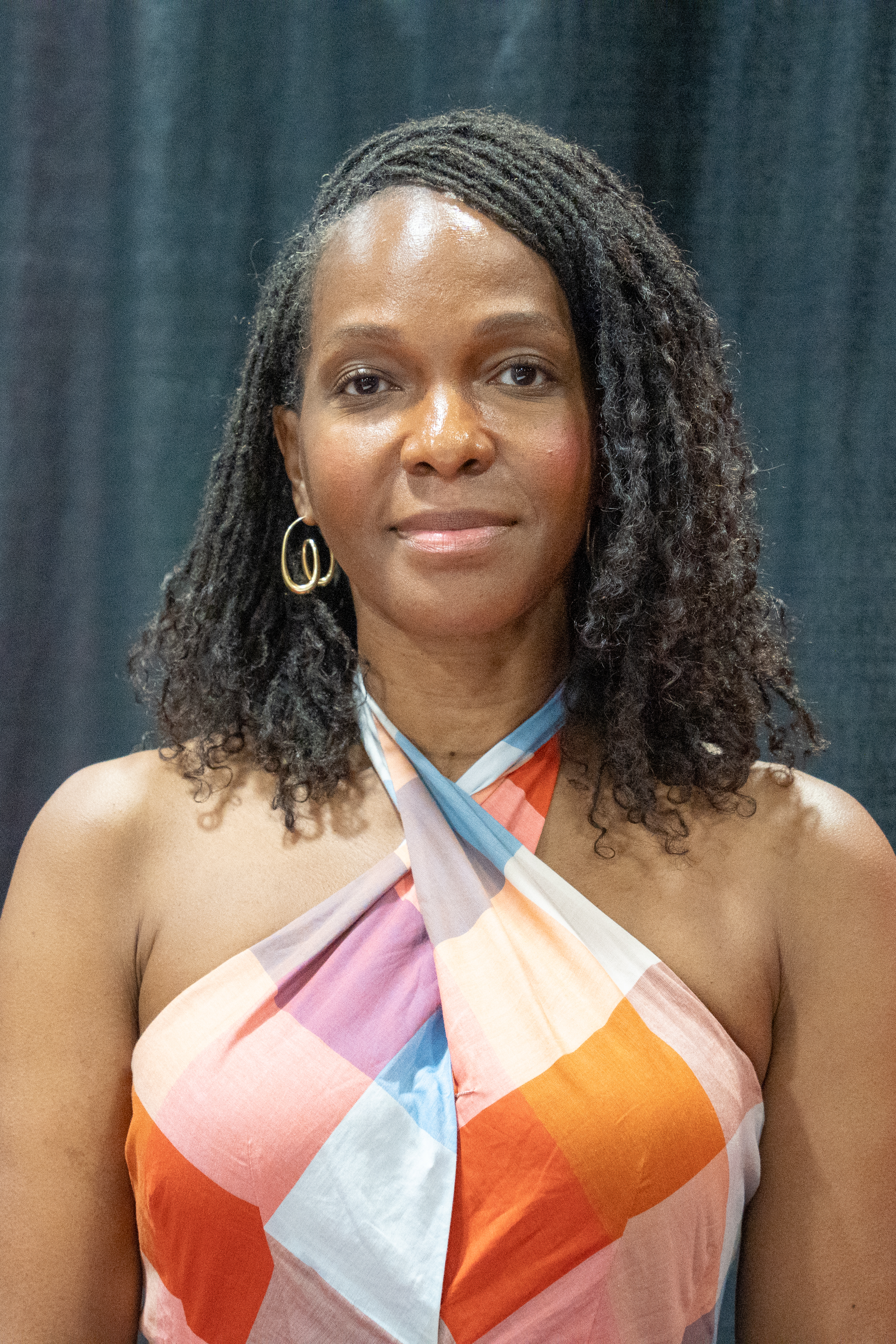
- Perry at the National Book Festival 2025
- Born: September 5, 1972 (age 54); Birmingham, Alabama, U.S.

Academic background
- Education: Yale University (BA); Harvard University (JD, PhD); Georgetown University (LLM)

Academic work
- Institutions: Rutgers University; Princeton University; Harvard University
- Main interests: Race, law, African American culture, citizenship, American politics, intellectual traditions, neoliberalism, culture and life, feminist thought, religious thought

Imani Perry (born September 5, 1972) is an American interdisciplinary scholar of race, law, literature, and African American culture. She is the Henry A. Morss Jr. and Elisabeth W. Morss Professor of Studies of Women, Gender and Sexuality and of African and African American Studies at Harvard University, a Carol K. Pforzheimer Professor at the Harvard Radcliffe Institute, and a columnist for The Atlantic. Perry won the 2022 National Book Award for Nonfiction for South to America: A Journey Below the Mason-Dixon to Understand the Soul of a Nation. In October 2023, she was named a MacArthur Fellow.

== Early life ==
Perry was born in Birmingham, Alabama. Her social activist parents moved the family to Cambridge, Massachusetts, when she was five years old. Her mother, Theresa Perry, is a professor in Africana Studies and Education at Simmons University and former dean at Wheelock College. Her stepfather, Steven Whitman (1943–2014), was an epidemiologist noted for studying racial disparities in health care. She has described herself as a "cradle Catholic".

== Education and academic career ==
Perry attended the public elementary school King Open School in Cambridge, Massachusetts, alongside Ilyon Woo. She attended high school at Concord Academy in Concord, Massachusetts, graduating in 1990. Perry received her Bachelor of Arts degree in American studies and literature from Yale University in 1994. She subsequently earned her Ph.D. in American Civilization from Harvard University and her J.D. from Harvard Law School (from which she graduated in 2000, at the age of 27). She completed a Future Law Professor's Fellowship and received her LLM from Georgetown University Law Center. She credits her childhood exposure to diverse cultures, regions, and religions with creating her desire to study race.

Perry taught at Rutgers School of Law in Camden for seven years. She received the New Professor of the Year award in her first year and was promoted to full professor at the end of five years, also winning the Board of Trustees Fellowship for Scholarly Excellence. Perry was also a visiting professor at the University of Pennsylvania Law School and an adjunct professor at both the Columbia University Institute for Research in African American Studies and Georgetown University Law Center.

In 2009, Perry left Rutgers to join the faculty of Princeton University. She held the title of Hughes-Rogers Professor of African American Studies and is affiliated with the Programs in Law and Public Affairs and Gender and Sexuality Studies.

In August 2014, Perry appeared on the public radio and podcast On Being, discussing race, community, and American consciousness with host Krista Tippett.

She released two books in 2018, one on the history of the black national anthem (from Oxford University Press) and another on gender, neoliberalism, and the digital age (from Duke University Press).

In 2021, Perry was awarded a fellowship in Intellectual and Cultural History from the John Simon Guggenheim Memorial Foundation.

On November 17, 2021, Perry's collected artwork, Welfare Queen, by Amy Sherald, sold for $3.9M in a Phillips New York auction.

In 2023, Perry joined the faculty of Harvard University, where she is the Henry A. Morss Jr. and Elisabeth W. Morss Professor of Studies of Women, Gender and Sexuality jointly appointed with African and African American Studies. She is also the Carol K. Pforzheimer Professor, Harvard Radcliffe Institute.

== Literary work ==
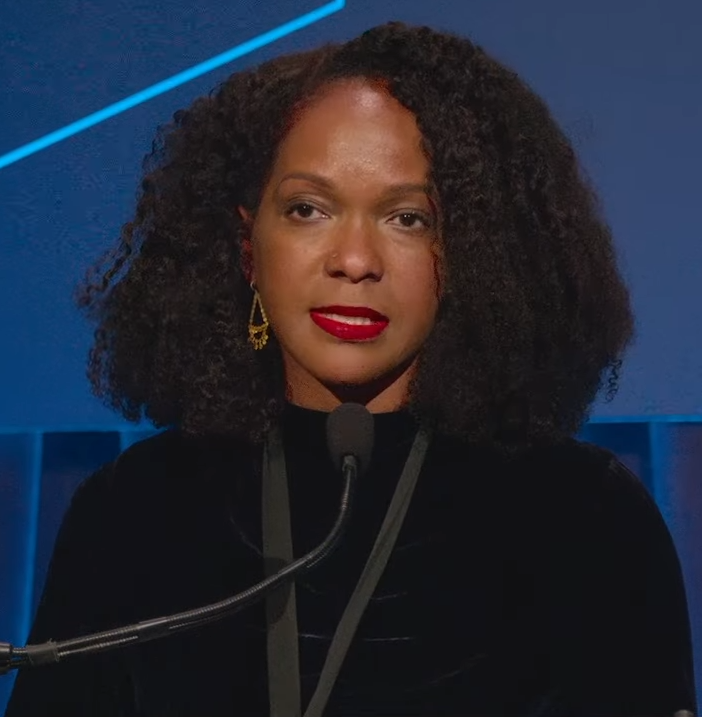
Perry in 2022

Perry is the author of six books and has published numerous articles on law, cultural studies, and African American studies, including a book about Lorraine Hansberry. She also wrote the notes and introduction to the Barnes and Noble Classics Collection edition of the Narrative of Sojourner Truth. Her work is largely influenced by the Birmingham and Frankfurt Schools, Critical Legal Studies, Critical Race Theory, and African American literary criticism. Through her scholarship, Perry has made significant contributions to the academic study of race and American hip hop music; she contributed a chapter to 2014's Born to Use Mics: Reading Nas's Illmatic (edited by Michael Eric Dyson and Sohail Daulatzai). Perry's 2022 book, South to America: A Journey Below the Mason-Dixon to Understand the Soul of a Nation, was a New York Times bestseller, and won the 2022 National Book Award for Nonfiction.

=== Full publication list ===
- 2004: Prophets of the Hood: Politics and Poetics in Hip Hop, Duke University Press; ISBN 9780822334354
- 2005: Narrative of Sojourner Truth, Barnes & Noble Classics Series, Notes and Introduction, Barnes & Noble; ISBN 9781593082932
- 2011: More Beautiful and More Terrible: The Embrace and Transcendence of Racial Inequality in the United States, New York University Press; ISBN 9780814767375
- 2018: Looking for Lorraine: The Radiant and Radical Life of Lorraine Hansberry, Beacon Press. ISBN 9780807064498
  - Winner of the 2019 PEN/Jacqueline Bograd Weld Award for Biography
  - New York Times Notable Book of 2018
- 2018: May We Forever Stand: A History of the Black National Anthem, University of North Carolina Press, ISBN 978-1-4696-3860-7
- 2018: Vexy Thing: On Gender and Liberation, Duke University Press. ISBN 9781478000600
- 2019: Breathe: A Letter to My Sons, Penguin Random House. ISBN 978-0807076552
- 2022: South to America: A Journey Below the Mason-Dixon to Understand the Soul of a Nation, Ecco Press. ISBN 978-0062977403
- 2025: Black in Blues: How a Color Tells the Story of My People, Ecco Press. ISBN 978-0062977397

== Personal life ==
Perry is divorced from the politician Chris Rabb, with whom she shares two children. She was diagnosed with lupus while studying at Harvard.

On February 6, 2016, Perry was pulled over by the Princeton police, who alleged that she was speeding at 67 miles per hour (108 km/h) in a 45-mile-per-hour (72 km/h) zone. Her driver's license was then found to be suspended due to unpaid parking tickets, one of which was two to three years old. Perry was arrested for the outstanding warrant and physically searched. She was handcuffed, transported to the police station, and handcuffed to a bench during the booking process. Perry posted bail and was released.

She subsequently drew parallels between police conduct in this incident and behavior cited in the national debate around racially motivated mistreatment, actual or alleged, of African Americans by the police. Video released by the Princeton Police Department revealed that she might have exaggerated her claims of mistreatment by the officer, though portions of the encounter remain out of view and there is no publicly available video of treatment at the police station. She appeared in municipal court the month after her arrest and paid $428 in traffic fines, the judge having reduced and amended the charges to a lesser offense, "from 22 miles over the speed limit, to nine miles over".

== Awards ==
Year	Title	Award	Category	Result	Ref
?	Looking for Lorraine	BCALA	Nonfiction	Honor Book	
2019	Looking for Lorraine	Publishing Triangle Awards	Judy Grahn Award	Shortlisted	
2019	Looking for Lorraine	Lambda Literary Awards	Nonfiction	Shortlisted	
2019	Looking for Lorraine	Pauli Murray Book Prize	—	Shortlisted	
2019	Looking for Lorraine	PEN/Jacqueline Bograd Weld Award	—	Won	
2019	May We Forever Stand	NAACP Image Awards	Nonfiction	Shortlisted	
2022	South to America	National Book Award	Nonfiction	Won	
2025	Black in Blues: How a Color Tells the Story of My People	Kirkus Prize	Nonfiction	Finalist	
