= What I Lived For =

1994 novel by Joyce Carol Oates

- First edition
- Author: Joyce Carol Oates
- Language: English
- Publisher: E. P. Dutton
- Publication date: 1994
- Publication place: United States
- Media type: Print (hardback)
- Pages: 624
- ISBN: 978-0525938361

What I Lived For is a novel by Joyce Carol Oates published in 1994 by E. P. Dutton. The work is a Pulitzer Prize finalist in 1995 and a 1995 finalist for the PEN/Faulkner Award for Fiction.

== Reception ==
Kirkus Reviews deems What I Lived For "a dazzling novel, brilliant both stylistically and in its depiction of a man running desperately for his life."

== Theme ==
"My process as a writer is to "build" a character simply by inhabiting him or her obsessively; during the course of writing a novel, I am immersed in my protagonists' souls virtually all my waking life. (And perhaps much of my dream life as well.) I see my own world, which I move through as myself, through 'fictitious' eyes, and note what my characters would think, do, in similar situations.—Joyce Carol Oates, 1996 interview with biographer Greg Johnson

New York Times literary critic James Carroll provides this thematic compendium:

In What I Lived For, Joyce Carol Oates has written a vivid and continuous nightmare: a savage dissection of our national myths of manhood and success, a bitter portrait of our futile effort to flee the weight of the past, a cold-eyed look at our loss of community and family, a shriek at the monsters men and women have become to each other and a revelation of our desolate inner lives. What I Lived For is an American "Inferno."

== Sources ==
- Carroll, James. He Could Not Tell a Lie. New York Times, April 2, 2000.https://archive.nytimes.com/www.nytimes.com/books/00/04/02/specials/oates-livedfor.html Accessed 12 April 2025.
- Johnson, Greg. 1996. A Reader's Guide to the Recent Novels of Joyce Carol Oates. E. P. Dutton, New York. in Celestial Timepiece: https://celestialtimepiece.com/2016/01/24/what-i-lived-for/ Accessed 10 April 2025.
- Oates, Joyce Carol. What I Lived For. E. P. Dutton, New York. ISBN 978-0525938361
