= Stone Award for Literary Achievement =

Literary award for American authors

The Stone Award for Literary Achievement is a literary award that recognizes American authors with bodies of critically acclaimed literary work who have also mentored younger generations of writers. Organized by Oregon State University, the award was first established in 2011 with a gift from Patrick and Vicki Stone. The winner receives an honorarium of $20,000.

== Recipients ==
- 2012 – Joyce Carol Oates
- 2014 – Tobias Wolff
- 2016 – Rita Dove
- 2019 – Colson Whitehead
- 2021 – Lynda Barry
- 2024 – Robin Wall Kimmerer
- 2026 – Natasha Trethewey

== See also ==
- List of literary awards
