= Wonderland (novel) =

1971 novel by Joyce Carol Oates

- First edition cover
- Author: Joyce Carol Oates
- Language: English
- Series: The Wonderland Quartet
- Genre: Naturalist novel
- Publisher: Vanguard Press
- Publication date: 1971
- Publication place: United States
- Media type: Print (hardback & paperback)
- Pages: 512 pp
- ISBN: 0-8129-7655-X
- OCLC: 70265617
- Dewey Decimal: 813/.54 22
- LC Class: PS3565.A8 W63 2006
- Preceded by: them

Wonderland is a 1971 novel by Joyce Carol Oates, the fourth in her "Wonderland Quartet" following A Garden of Earthly Delights (1967), Expensive People (1968), and them (1969). It was a finalist for the annual U.S. National Book Award for Fiction and it has been called one of the author's best books.

Wonderland follows the character Jesse Vogel from his childhood in the Great Depression to his marriage and career in the late 1960s. Oates later wrote that Jesse is a protagonist who does not have an identity unless he is "deeply involved in meaningful experience", a theme that allowed her to address both what she calls "the phantasmagoria of personality" and the faceless nature of the novelist.

Oates wrote in a 1992 Afterword that Wonderland among her early novels was "the most bizarre and obsessive" and "the most painful to write". Oates continued to think about the novel after its completion, and rewrote the ending for the 1972 paperback edition. She also continued to write about the Vogels: the play Ontological Proof of My Existence is an expansion of Jesse's visit to Toronto in the novel, and she considers the story 'How I Contemplated the World from the Detroit House of Correction, and Began My Life Over Again' "an analogue of Shelley [Vogel]'s experience as a runaway to Toledo."

== Summary ==
=== Book 1: Variations on an American Hymn ===
Jesse Harte is fourteen years old in Yewville, NY, in 1939, when his despairing father Willard murders Jesse's mother, two sisters, and brother, and then tries to shoot Jesse before the father commits suicide. Jesse moves in with his maternal grandfather, Grandpa Vogel, but runs away and lives with his cousin Fritz for a while. Then he goes to the Niagara County home for Boys, outside Lockport, until a doctor named Pederson from Lockport adopts him.

Jesse lives with the Pedersons: Karl Pederson, M.D., his wife Mary (née Shirer), and their children Frederich and Hilda. Frederich is a pianist and Hilda is a math prodigy. Jesse excels in school and Dr. Pederson drills him constantly in different subjects, particularly biology, encouraging Jesse to become a doctor like himself. When he is sixteen, Jesse travels to New York and watches Hilda perform in a math competition. Mrs. Pederson becomes increasingly nervous and dependent upon Jesse. Jesse skips a grade and is accepted at the University of Michigan. One day Mrs. Pederson begs Jesse to take her to a hotel in Buffalo, because she is terrified of Dr. Pederson and claims he is controlling her entire life. Jesse acquiesces, but Dr. Pederson eventually forces Mrs. Pederson to come home, and he disowns Jesse.

=== Book 2: The Finite Passing of an Infinite Passion ===
Jesse enrolls at the University of Michigan, though the money Dr. Pederson gave him soon runs out. He legally changes his name to Jesse Vogel, studies hard, and works to pay off his debts to the University, sleeping little. He greatly admires Dr. Benjamin Cady, who teaches a neuroscience course. Jesse becomes sick with mononucleosis and, while recovering in the hospital, falls in love with a nurse named Anne-Marie Seton. One day Jesse returns to his apartment and finds a man named Talbot "Trick" Waller Monk in it, an assistant to Dr. Cady. "Trick" introduces himself and says that he would like to be a poet rather than a doctor. Jesse becomes increasingly suspicious of Anne-Marie and eventually breaks up with her.

While on an errand with his landlady's daughter, Jesse sees Dr. Cady in a parking lot with a young woman and learns that she is Cady's daughter, Helene. Jesse soon becomes engaged to Helene, as well as close friends with Trick. The three spend a lot of time together but one day at a restaurant Trick begins spontaneously reciting his own strange poetry, and Jesse and Helene try to leave. Trick tries to attack Jesse, and when Jesse defends himself, Trick collapses and must go to a hospital because of a rheumatic heart condition.

Jesse works as an intern at LaSalle Hospital in Chicago, the head of which is Dr. Roderick Perrault. Jesse marries Helene Cady and she becomes pregnant, but she feels isolated because Jesse works so much. She gives birth to a girl, Jeanne. One day when Jesse is walking with Jeanne he sees an attractive woman who seems familiar to him, and when he introduces himself she says that her name is Reva Denk. Jesse becomes Chief Resident at LaSalle and Helene becomes pregnant again, but Jesse obsesses over Reva Denk and eventually contacts her again, telling her that he would leave Helene for Reva. Reva implies that she is pregnant and needs him (a doctor) to perform an abortion for her, which he refuses. William H. Shirer, the father of Mary Pederson, dies and leaves Jesse a small fortune, but when he shows the paperwork to Helene, she accuses him of being in love with someone else. Jesse drives off and finds Reva Denk again, proposing to her that he stay with her and raise Denk's child as his own, but Jesse finds that he cannot follow through on this and he returns to Helene.

=== Book 3: Dreaming America ===
Jesse Vogel uses his inheritance from William Shirer to start his own clinic. He attends a doctors' conference with his family - Helene, Jeanne, and their younger daughter Michele (Shelley) - in New York City on November 22, 1963. Jesse works harder than ever, at his clinic and on editing the book that Dr. Perrault failed to complete before dying. As he neglects his family, his daughter Shelley becomes very rebellious, though Jeanne progresses and plans to study biology in college. Shelley travels with some friends to Toledo, and after they get arrested Jesse drives there and takes her home. Shelley eventually runs away again, this time for good, and she sends postcards to her father with no return address. These postcards come from all over the map - Homestead, the Gulf of Mexico, New York City, San Angelo, Best, Venice Beach - and Shelley says that she is with a young man named Noel. One postcard mentions the poet T. W. Monk, and Jesse journeys to New York to find Trick. Trick is now a published poet but also in poor health and a drug addict, and Trick has no useful information as to Shelley's whereabouts. Finally a postcard says that she is on Yonge Street, in Toronto, and it implies that she is very sick from drug abuse. Jesse drives to Toronto and finds her emaciated in a disgusting apartment. She resists her father, saying that Noel told her that Jesse is the devil.

== Interpretation ==
G. F. Waller characterizes "Wonderland" as "a society of schizoids: its inhabitants define their goals in the rhetoric of idealism - the integrity of the individual, the promise of the future, the freedom and uniqueness of the personality - but it acts as if these great goals...are graspable only in the most immediate material forms." Mary Ann Wilson observes, "the elements of the past from which Jesse thinks he is escaping reappear again as he is in the end a frustrated, ineffectual father like his own...as Jesse had fled his insane, murderous father at the beginning of the novel, his own runaway daughter, Shelley, flees her father accusing him of wanting to kill her." Jeoffrey Steven Bull argues that Jesse refuses to accept his own past, and instead "looks for relief in the nihilism of isolated sovereignty," denying his own personality so that he can dominate everything. Bull also states that "homeostasis is the goal towards which Jesse works...the term can help readers understand the simultaneous dread of contingency and longing for freedom evident in Jesse and other characters."
