= A Book of American Martyrs =

2017 novel by Joyce Carol Oates

- First edition
- Author: Joyce Carol Oates
- Publisher: Ecco Press
- English publication date: 2017

A Book of American Martyrs is a 2017 novel by the American author, Joyce Carol Oates. The story chronicles two American families, the Voorheeses and the Dunphys, whose faith and convictions are vastly different. The story begins with the aftermath of the November 1999 murder of Dr. Gus Voorhees by Luther Amos Dunphy.

Oates' story explores the abortion debate in the United States, with a primary focus on exploring the growing divide and conflict between advocates and opponents of legal abortion care services, as well as anti-abortion violence. The story is set in a small town in Ohio where the Dunphy family lives and throughout Michigan where the Voorhees family lives.

The book was longlisted for the International Dublin Literary Award in 2019.

== Reception ==
Erica Wagner of The Guardian noted that the novel does not live up to its potential, writing, "This is a gripping novel, full of unexpected twists that make what could be a political treatise into a page-turner. And it is as honest as its author can make it, or so the reader must believe; but that's an honesty that only goes so far."

Writing for The New York Times, Ayana Mathis describes how "The shifting kaleidoscope of voices is at once illuminating and dizzying. Oates may be betting the multitude of perspectives will help us see around our blinders and prejudices about the Other. The question is, who is the Other, and according to whom? In some respects, Oates's bet pays off." However, Mathis continues, "There is a great deal of smugness in all of this, and worse, a dangerous paternalism. The Other, in this case, the white working poor, with all of its religion and pathologies, has been summarily dismissed as an ignorant horde in need of (liberal) guidance. Oates's lengthy attempt at insights into these lives devolves into dehumanizing caricature."

The Washington Post's Ron Charles praises the novel, concluding that, "To enter this masterpiece is to be captivated by the paradox of that tragic courage and to become invested in Oates's search for some semblance of atonement, secular or divine. Regardless of your own faith or politics, the real miracle here is how, even after 700 pages, we can still be racing along, steeling ourselves for the very last line, a line we’re desperate to reach — but not too soon."

Paste magazine's Bridey Heing commends Oates' ability to navigate both sides of a deeply polarizing topic, noting how, "Ultimately, Oates does not moralize, and this isn't a book that will comfort those who are strong in their beliefs. But in that lies the book's value. At a time when we as a society feel so ideologically distant and yet are told that we have more in common than all that divides us, this novel rings true without being weighed down by sentimentality."

The Harvard Review was generally positive, finding it "an accessible literary novel that synthesizes many of the key cultural and political issues of our time through a remarkable range of fully developed characters".
