= Raymond J. Smith =

American educator and author

Raymond Joseph Smith (12 March 1930 – 18 February 2008) was an American educator, author, and book editor. He was for more than 30 years the editor of Ontario Review, a literary magazine, and the Ontario Review Press, a literary book publisher. He was married to the American author Joyce Carol Oates.

== Early life ==
Smith was born in Milwaukee, Wisconsin. He graduated from the University of Wisconsin–Milwaukee with a bachelor's degree in English. He received his PhD in English at the University of Wisconsin–Madison in 1960, where he met his future wife, fellow graduate student Joyce Carol Oates.

== Career ==
Smith taught 18th-century English literature at the University of Windsor and New York University until 1980, when he left teaching for editing and publishing. He and Oates co-founded The Ontario Review, a literary magazine, in 1974, with Oates serving as associate editor. The magazine's mission, according to Smith, was to bridge the literary and artistic culture of the U.S. and Canada: "We tried to do this by publishing writers and artists from both countries, as well as essays and reviews of an intercultural nature." In 1980, Oates and Smith co-founded Ontario Review Books, an independent publishing house.

In 2004, Oates described the partnership as "a marriage of like minds—both my husband and I are so interested in literature and we read the same books; he'll be reading a book and then I'll read it—we trade and we talk about our reading at meal times [...] it's a very collaborative and imaginative marriage".

Smith authored Charles Churchill, a critical study of the short-lived 18th-century British satirist. Smith also served as editor of a number of anthologies that appeared in The Ontario Review.

== Death ==
Smith died on 18 February 2008 (age 77), in Princeton, New Jersey, from complications of pneumonia. In April 2008, Oates wrote to an interviewer: "Since my husband's unexpected death, I really have very little energy [...] My marriage—my love for my husband—seems to have come first in my life, rather than my writing. Set beside his death, the future of my writing scarcely interests me at the moment."

The 13 December 2010 issue of The New Yorker carried Oates' "A Widow's Story," describing her last days with Smith.

== A Widow's Memoir ==
Smith's widow, Joyce Carol Oates, published a memoir in February 2011 recounting their nearly 47-year marriage and her struggle to cope with his sudden death. According to Oates, he became ill at home in mid-February 2008 and was admitted to the Princeton Medical Center, diagnosed with a virulent form of pneumonia. He was still in the hospital recovering from the pneumonia when, a week later, he was stricken by a secondary infection. Oates was called to his bedside during the night, but he died before she arrived.

Oates writes that Smith came from an intensely devout Catholic Irish American family and, as a young man, he entered a seminary. But Smith would later become "furious at the church". Smith left behind an unfinished novel, which he had started before they met and he had continued intermittently through the years.

Oates was 22 when, after a three-month courtship, she married the 31-year-old Smith in 1961. The couple had no children, and neither wrote about that aspect of their marriage.
