= Them (novel) =

1969 novel by Joyce Carol Oates

them
- First edition
- Author: Joyce Carol Oates
- Language: English
- Series: The Wonderland Quartet
- Genre: Naturalist novel
- Publisher: Vanguard Press (first); Fawcett Books (reissue paperback)
- Publication date: June 1969
- Publication place: United States
- Media type: Print (hardback & paperback)
- Pages: 508 pp (hard); 480 pp (paper)
- ISBN: 0-8149-0668-0
- OCLC: 29458
- Dewey Decimal: 813/.5/4
- LC Class: PZ4.O122 Th PS3565.A8
- Preceded by: Expensive People
- Followed by: Wonderland

Them (stylized in all lowercase) is a novel by Joyce Carol Oates, the third in her "Wonderland Quartet" following A Garden of Earthly Delights (1967) and Expensive People (1968) and preceding Wonderland (1971). It was published by Vanguard in 1969 and it won the U.S. National Book Award for Fiction in 1970.

Many years and many awards later, Oates surmised that them and Blonde (2000) were the works she will most be remembered for, and would most want a new reader to select, though she added that "I could as easily have chosen a number of titles."

== Genesis ==
In the book's foreword, Oates writes that them is based for the most part upon the life of a real family. The main character, "Maureen Wendall," contacted Oates by mail after she had failed a college course taught by the author, and these letters are included (presumably verbatim) in the novel, about two-thirds of the way through the text.

Saying that "the novel practically wrote itself," Oates organized the story and recast it as fiction, but at certain points she revised the text to include "Maureen Wendall's" words verbatim. Oates noted that, rather than sensationalizing the story of the Wendalls to make slum life more lurid, she softened some sections so that they would not overwhelm the reader. She said that the confessional aspect was, at least temporarily, extremely therapeutic to "Maureen Wendall" and that all the family members were still living.

In an addendum to the afterword, Oates said that the "realist" element was a literary device: all characters and events were entirely fictional. She wrote Maureen's letters, and the "Miss Oates" to whom the letters are written is also a fictional character. At the time (1962–1967), Oates used the name of Joyce Smith.

== Plot ==
The story begins with Loretta Botsford and her brother Brock as teenagers, living in the 1930s in a "fair-sized city on a midwestern canal". Loretta falls in love with Bernie Malin, and sleeps with him. Later in the night, Brock fatally shoots Bernie in the head. Loretta runs away, and meets Howard Wendall, an older cop to whom she confesses the death of Bernie Malin.

They later marry, and she bears son Jules (who is hinted to be Bernie Malin's son). Loretta and Howard live close to Mama and Papa Wendall's house, on the south side of town. Soon after the birth of Jules, Howard is busted for taking money from prostitutes. The Wendalls move into the country house with Howard's family, where Loretta bears her daughters Maureen and Betty.

When World War II breaks out, Howard leaves his family to fight in Europe. Meanwhile, Jules grows up to be a fast, energetic child who hangs around older children, and is never still. Maureen is a quiet, shy, delicate girl, while Betty is a smart aleck. Jules as a child displays a fascination with fire when he burns down a deserted barn, and when a plane crashes in Detroit.

Loretta decides to move to Detroit with her children while Howard is still at war. Jules takes on the role of the "bad boy" who hangs out with kids who steal from stores and smoke at school. Many conclude that Jules will not live past twenty. Soon Jules is expelled from the Catholic school and sent to a public school apart from his sisters.

As time progresses, Jules becomes more involved in petty theft. He falls passionately in love with a rich girl, Nadine, from the suburbs, whom he helps to run away to Texas. She abandons him in a hotel when he becomes ill, and steals his car and money.

After Howard dies in a work accident, Loretta remarries. She relies increasingly on Maureen to run the household. Feeling the desire to escape, Maureen turns to prostitution to build an escape fund. When her stepfather discovers her secret, he savagely beats her. He is convicted and jailed for assault, resulting in Loretta divorcing him, and Maureen suffering a year-long nervous breakdown. She gradually recovers with the care of Loretta's brother Brock, who has unexpectedly returned, and the letters of Jules, who slowly drifts back North from Texas.

Some time later, Jules is doing better in business working for his uncle when he reconnects with Nadine. She has married, but they initiate an affair. She has mental problems and shoots him. Jules survives, but has lost all his drive. Maureen has moved out and is working as a typist and taking night classes. She sets her sights on her professor, a married man, and they begin an affair. When Maureen coolly tells her mother of her plans to become a housewife, Loretta is incensed.

After his recovery, Jules is maintaining several affairs. He rapes a girl and later pimps her out. He also becomes involved with a group of intellectual radicals. He is present at the 1967 Detroit riots, when Loretta's apartment is among the buildings burned. In the chaos, Jules commits murder.

Later, Jules visits Maureen, who has isolated herself from the rest of her family in Dearborn, Michigan with her husband and is expecting a child. Loretta is surviving, and Jules plans to try his fortunes in California.

== Reception ==
Geoffrey Wolff wrote, "This novel is a charnel house of Gothic paraphernalia: blood, fire, insanity, anarchy, lust, corruption, death by bullets, death by cancer, death by plane crash, death by stabbing, beatings, crime, riot and even unhappiness. Its ruling principles are hate and violence." Entela Kushta lamented, "At the conclusion of the novel, the Wendall family is completely destroyed. Loretta has lost track of her children, and Maureen takes the final step toward removing herself from the old family by rejecting her own brother. Though they go on searching for love, Oates's urban dwellers can find none...It is the multitudes of people and the continuous displacement of people which make familiarity impossible and withdrawal a likely defense."

Susan Koppelman Cornillon wrote that "one is uncertain, while reading the works of Miss Oates, whether or not she does, in fact, separate her own attitudes and opinions on the issue of sex role from her characters." She suggested, "A writer can portray the unconscious perpetration of socialization on her characters without herself reinforcing the attitudes being internalized by her characters," but implied that Oates's characters came across mostly as sexist stereotypes.

George Vecsey made a reference to the novel in his critique of baseball fans in 1985: "I pointed ahead on Michigan Avenue to the old battleship-gray ballpark and said, 'Them,' in the Joyce Carol Oates sense of the word. The problem with sports these days is the fans."

== Awards ==
The novel won a National Book Award in 1970.
