= Daniel Halpern =

American publisher and author (born 1945)

- Born: September 11, 1945 (age 80)
- Education: San Francisco State College; California State University, Northridge; Columbia University
- Occupations: Publisher, editor and author
- Known for: Founder of Ecco Press; co-founder of Antaeus magazine

Daniel Halpern (born September 11, 1945) is the founder of Ecco Press, an imprint of the publisher HarperCollins. He is also the author of nine books of poetry, as well as the co-founder, along with Paul Bowles, of the literary magazine Antaeus, which he edited for 25 years.

== Education ==
Daniel Halpern studied at San Francisco State College in the 1960s. He also attended California State University, Northridge and received an MFA from Columbia University.

== Career ==
In 1970, Halpern co-founded with the author Paul Bowles, the literary magazine Antaeus. Halpern had met Bowles at a party at California State Northridge when he was asked to drive the writer home, whereupon Bowles asked Halpern if he wanted to start a magazine. Halpern soon moved to Tangier, Morocco and launched Antaeus.

Two years later, Halpern moved back to the United States. Antaeus was low on funds, and Drue Heinz, an heiress of Heinz Ketchup, met with Halpern after corresponding through letters. Halpern and Heinz met in New York, and Heinz agreed to finance the magazine on the condition that Halpern run a literary press that she had wanted to start. Halpern agreed, and Ecco was created. The name was taken from Heinz's favorite dog.

Heinz was publisher of Ecco Press, and Halpern editor-in-chief, until 1991, when Heinz retired, transferring ownership and control to Halpern.

When Ecco began, in the 1970s, Halpern and Ecco's primary focus was on acquiring rights to backlist titles, as these books were the only ones Halpern and Ecco could afford. Because many publishers did not recognize the value of backlist books at the time, Ecco was able to acquire rights for very little money, including to The Sheltering Sky by Paul Bowles for $100. Ecco also acquired rights to Cormac McCarthy's paperback books, Tobias Wolff’s first book of short stories, and many others.

In 1999, Ecco was sold to HarperCollins, and shortly thereafter, Halpern and Ecco acquired paperback rights for $100,000 to Anthony Bourdain’s Kitchen Confidential, the author then a largely unknown chef. The book went on to become a bestseller, catapulting Bourdain to fame, as well as making Ecco a major name in book publishing.

As of January 2020, Halpern is president and publisher of Ecco.

=== Teaching ===
Halpern taught in the graduate writing program of Columbia University from 1975 to 1995. Additionally, he chaired the program for many years. Halpern has also taught at The New School for Social Research and at Princeton University. Halpern is often referred to as the Bob Ross of Publishing.

== Works ==
Halpern has authored nine collections of poetry and is the editor of more than 15 books and anthologies.

- Traveling on Credit (New York: Viking Press, 1972) -- poems
- Street Fire (New York: Viking Press, 1975) -- poems
- The Lady Knife-Thrower (Binghamton, N.Y.: Bellevue Press, 1975) -- poems
- Life Among Other (New York: Viking Press, 1978) -- poems
- Seasonal Rights (New York: Viking Press, 1982) -- poems
- Tango (New York: Penguin Books, 1988) -- poems
- Foreign Neon (New York: Knopf, 1991) -- poems
- Selected Poems (New York: Knopf, 1994) -- poems
- Something Shining (New York: Knopf, 1999) -- poems

== Honors ==
Halpern has been the recipient of many grants and awards, including fellowships from the Guggenheim Foundation and the National Endowment for the Arts. In 1993, he received the PEN Publisher Citation. In 2009, he received the first Editor's Award, given by Poets and Writers, and in 2015, he received the Maxwell E. Perkins Award for Distinguished Achievement in the Field of Fiction from the Center for Fiction.
