= Because It Is Bitter, and Because It Is My Heart =

1990 novel by Joyce Carol Oates

Because It Is Bitter, Because It Is My Heart
- First edition
- Author: Joyce Carol Oates
- Language: English
- Publisher: E. P. Dutton
- Publication date: 1990
- Publication place: United States
- Media type: Print (hardback)
- Pages: 405
- ISBN: 978-0525248606

Because It Is Bitter, and Because It Is My Heart is a 1990 novel by American novelist Joyce Carol Oates. The title is taken from "In the Desert", a poem by Stephen Crane. Oates's novel was nominated for best work of fiction in the 1990 National Book Awards.

== Plot summary ==
In the early 1950s in Hammond, New York, a young white girl named Iris Courtney and her black friend Jinx Fairchild are united by a murder that they commit in self-defense. From this central moment, this novel weaves out the stories of two families that intercross across divisions of race and class.

== Critical reaction ==
Entertainment Weekly gave it an A, calling Oates "a storyteller with few peers".
