= South to America =

2022 book by Imani Perry

South to America: A Journey Below the Mason-Dixon to Understand the Soul of a Nation
- Author: Imani Perry
- Language: English
- Publisher: HarperCollins
- Publication date: 2022
- Publication place: United States
- Media type: Print (hardcover and paperback)
- Pages: 432
- ISBN: 978-0062977403

South to America: A Journey Below the Mason-Dixon to Understand the Soul of a Nation is a 2022 book by scholar Imani Perry, published by Harper Collins. The book received the 2022 National Book Award for Nonfiction.

In researching the book, Perry travelled to over a dozen cities and towns in the American South, interviewing local residents, as well as documenting the histories of the locales; both distant histories as well as more contemporary.

== Narrative ==
Perry discusses various historical figures from the South during her travels. While in Harper's Ferry, West Virginia, she documents the history of Shields Green, one of the raiders who took part in John Brown's raid on Harper Ferry, a failed attempt by abolitionists to seize control of the Harper's Ferry Armory and foment a nationwide slave rebellion. She discusses historical massacres such as the Wilmington massacre of 1898 as well as more contemporary racially motivated crimes such as the Charleston church shooting. Other parts of the book shift in focus to memoir as Perry discusses the lives of her grandmother and other family members who grew up in the South. The overall conclusion of the book is that racism was heavily ingrained in the American South, indeed the history of America, and that its effects continue to permeate to this day as racism remains pervasive in modern American society.

== Reception ==
In a positive review, writing for The New York Times, writer Tayari Jones stated that the book was an "insightful, ambitious and moving project" that combined many forms of literary technique including history, literary criticism, journalism, and memoir. Jones concluded that the book was an "essential meditation on the South, its relationship to American culture — even Americanness itself." Writing for the Los Angeles Review of Books, Suzanne Van Atten stated that the work was a "compelling, thought-provoking read sure to spark both consensus and debate, but ultimately it serves to illustrate just how much race impacts life in this country." For the Los Angeles Times, Carolyn Kellogg commended Perry for being able to discuss historical events, while also seamlessly supplementing the prose with personal experiences and cultural critique. Kellogg also states that in the work, Perry was able to tell vibrant stories without being constrained by literary borders separating disciplines or genres.
