= With Shuddering Fall =

1964 novel by Joyce Carol Oates

- First edition
- Author: Joyce Carol Oates
- Language: English
- Publisher: Vanguard Press
- Publication date: 1964
- Publication place: United States
- Media type: Print (hardback)
- Pages: 316
- ISBN: 9780814901731
- OCLC: 304539

With Shuddering Fall is a novel by Joyce Carol Oates, first published in 1964 by Vanguard Press. A Fawcett Publications paperback edition was issued in 1973. The first of the many novels by Oates, it is set in the fictional Eden County, as are her early short stories.

== Plot ==
The story is presented from a third-person omniscient point-of-view. The focal character is the 17-year-old Karen Herz.

Karen lives with her fundamentalist Christian and authoritarian father on his farm. His youngest daughter, she is in thrall to his religious fervor and appears to be content to submit to his paternalism. She is particularly impressed with the bible story of Abraham and Isaac, and longs for absolution. Karen becomes embroiled with Shar, the teenage son of a neighbor. She rejects his sexual advances, but the encounter leads to a fist fight between Shar and Karen's father. The vindictive patriarch demands of Karen that she seek retribution against his abuser. Shar attempts but fails to rape Karen, after which she gives herself to him. She follows Shar when he leaves to pursue the transient and risky life of a driver on the racetrack circuit. Max, his promoter, is a cynic who derives a vicarious thrill from his protogee's reckless abandon on the racetrack. Karen fulfills her father's dictate by sending Shar to his death in a race, first having vindictively rejected his love.

== Retrospective appraisal ==
Though Oates has laced the novel with "perennial best-seller ingredients," her work is endowed with elements of "literary and philosophical allusions" that transcend the narrative featuring sex and violence.

Biographer Joanne V. Creighton, however, detects an inadequacy in the development of Oates's protagonists: "Perhaps the novel's most blatant weakness is the failure of the two main characters, Shar and Karen, to come to life as credible creations. Lacking reality, they do not engage the readers empathy and sympathy."

With Shuddering Fall stands as a significant apprenticeship effort that anticipates the themes and structure of Oates's subsequent five novels.

== Theme ==
The ironically named "Eden" County serves both a symbolic and literal function in a novel that is "most centrally a study in the nature of innocence."

At the center of the work is the irreconcilable differences between Karen and Shar, each of whom strives for self-identity. Their "diametrically opposed personalities" do not prevent them from becoming lovers, but dialectically ensure that the contest between "a Christian versus pagan-world view" will end in tragedy. Biographer Joanne V. Creighton writes:

The two become involved in a life-and-death struggle for mastery and control, a battle that Karen wins because her nullity gives her greater strength than Shar's passion.

Literary critic Greg Johnson identifies the "biblical myths" that provide framework and "symbolic resonance" for the novel. Commenting on With Shuddering Fall and the short fiction that Oates sets in Eden County, Johnson writes:

Virtually all the characters in these early works are poor and inarticulate; their stories, often beginning with the phrase 'Some time ago in Eden County...,' have an uncanny power as dark fables of disillusionment and defeat.

== Sources ==
- Creighton, Joanne V. 1979. Joyce Carol Oates. Twayne Publishers, New York. Warren G. French, editor. ISBN 0-8057-7212-X
- Johnson, Greg. 1987. Understanding Joyce Carol Oates. University of South Carolina Press, Columbia, South Carolina. ISBN 0-87249-524-8
- Johnson, Greg. 1994. Joyce Carol Oates: A Study of the Short Fiction. Twayne's studies in short fiction; no. 57. Twayne Publishers, New York. ISBN 0-8057-0857-X
- Knowles, John. 1964. "A Racing Car is a Symbol of Violence" The New York Times, October 24, 1964. A Racing Car Is the Symbol of Violence Accessed 15 January 2025.
- Oates, Joyce Carol. With Shuddering Fall. Vanguard Press, New York. ISBN 9780814901731
- Pagones, Dorrie. 1964. "Price of Survival" Saturday Review, November 28, 1964.
