= Sylvester & Orphanos =

Sylvester & Orphanos was a publishing house originally founded in Los Angeles by Ralph Sylvester, Stathis Orphanos and George Fisher in 1972. When Fisher moved to New York City, Sylvester & Orphanos specialized in limited-signed press books.

== Origins ==
Christopher Isherwood was the first author published by Sylvester & Orphanos with a deluxe edition of Christopher and His Kind illustrated by original artwork from Isherwood's partner, Don Bachardy.

Through Isherwood, Sylvester & Orphanos met Gore Vidal and they published Vidal’s Sex Is Politics and Vice Versa.

== Founders ==
Stathis Orphanos (October 12, 1940 – January 13, 2018) and Ralph Sylvester (January 13, 1934 – January 23, 2018) were partners in life and business. They met in Los Angeles in 1960.

Stathis Orphanos was also a photographer and among his works are portraits of:

- Don Bachardy
- Kaye Ballard
- Clive Barker
- Donald Barthelme
- John Barth
- Leonard Baskin
- Robert Bloch
- Claire Bloom
- Steve Bond
- John Malcolm Brinnin
- Shirley Burden
- Paul Cadmus
- Erskine Caldwell
- Jim Carroll
- Maxwell Caulfield
- John Cheever
- Robert Coover
- Malcolm Cowley
- Mart Crowley
- George Cukor
- Jules Dassin
- Elaine de Kooning
- James Dickey
- P. David Ebersole
- Harlan Ellison
- Odysseus Elytis
- James Galanos
- Graham Greene
- Thom Gunn
- Julie Harris
- David Hockney
- Horst P. Horst
- Todd Hughes
- John Irving
- Christopher Isherwood
- Thomas Keneally
- Gavin Lambert
- Jack Larson and James Bridges
- Jerome Lawrence and Robert E. Lee
- Naguib Mahfouz
- Michael Mailer
- Norman Mailer
- James Merrill
- Brian Moore
- Esai Morales
- Hermes Pan
- Reynolds Price
- José Quintero
- Rex Reed
- Edouard Roditi
- Philip Roth
- May Sarton
- John Schlesinger
- Budd Schulberg
- Hubert Selby, Jr.
- Sir Stephen Spender
- Robert Stone
- William Styron
- Edmund Teske
- John Updike
- Mamie Van Doren
- Gore Vidal
- John A. Williams
- Colin Wilson

In 2015, Sylvester & Orphanos donated their catalogue and photographs to the Library of Congress.

== Exhibitions ==
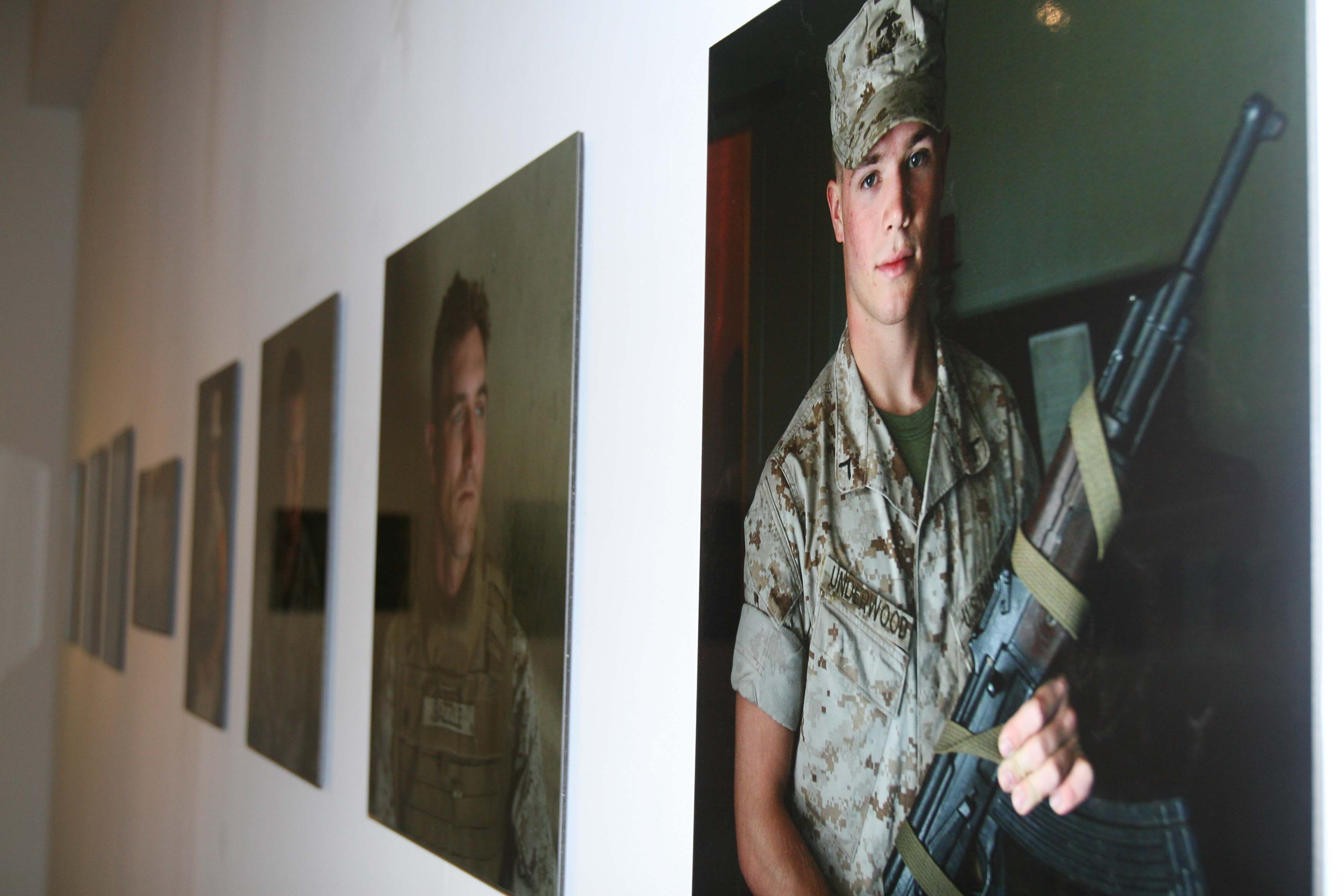
The "Honor: Marine Portraits" exhibit with photographs of San Diego Marines stands on display in the Oceanside Museum of Art March 27. The photographer, Stathis Orphanos (1940-2018), captured hundreds of photographs of Maines in various uniforms and training events

- Photography exhibition, San Diego County, 1988
- Los Angeles, 1989, curated by Shirley Burden, former Chairman of the Department of Photography at New York's Museum of Modern Art
- University of California, Los Angeles, 1990, Combined exhibition of Stahis Orphanos photographs and limited-edition books, curated by Dan Luckenbill
- Beverly Hills Public Library 1995, curated by Stefan Klima
- Beverly Hills Civic Center, 1996, retrospective of Stathis Orphanos' photographs
- Honor: Marine Portraits, Oceanside Museum of Art, 2010
- My Cavafy, Photo Exhibit by Stathis Orphanos, Affinity, West Hollywood
- 2014, The Perfect Exposure Gallery, Los Angeles

== Catalogue ==
Sylvester & Orphanos published in total 25 limited editions:

- 1976, Christopher Isherwood, Christopher and His Kind, 130 copies
- 1978, Joyce Carol Oates, Sentimental Education
- 1979, Gore Vidal, Sex is Politics and Vice Versa
- 1979, William Styron, Shadrach
- 1980, Graham Greene, How Father Quixote Became a Monsignor
- 1980, John Cheever, The Leaves, the Lion-Fish, and the Bear
- 1980, Nadine Gordimer, Town and Country Lovers
- 1980, V. S. Naipaul, A Congo Diary
- 1980, Margaret Drabble, Hassan's Tower
- 1980, James Merrill, Samos
- 1980, Donald Barthelme, The Emerald
- 1980, J. V. Cunningham, Dickinson: Lyric and Legend
- 1980, Reynolds Price, A Final Letter
- 1980, Philip Roth, Novotny's Pain
- 1981, James Purdy, Scrap of Paper & The Beiry-Picker: Two Plays by James Purdy
- 1981, Tennessee Williams, It Happened the Day the Sun Rose
- 1981, Paul Bowles, In the Red Room
- 1982, Richard Adams, The Legend of Te Tuna
- 1982, John Cheever, The National Pastime
- 1983, Graham Greene, A Quick Look Behind: Footnotes to an Autobiography
- 1985, William Hjortsberg, Tales & Fables
- 1985, John Updike, Impressions
- 1988, John Cheever, Expelled
- 1990, Graham Greene, A Weed Among the Flowers
- 1990, Yannis Tsarouchis: The Face of Modem Greece (in preparation in 1990, likely not released)
