= Ecco Press =

Imprint of HarperCollins

- Parent company: HarperCollins
- Founded: 1971; 55 years ago
- Founder: Daniel Halpern
- Country of origin: United States
- Headquarters location: Manhattan, New York City
- Key people: Helen Atsma, Sarah Murphy
- Publication types: Books
- Fiction genres: Literary Fiction, poetry
- Official website: eccobooks.com

Ecco is a New York–based publishing imprint of HarperCollins. It was founded in 1971 by Daniel Halpern as an independent publishing company; Publishers Weekly described it as "one of America's best-known literary houses." In 1999, Ecco was acquired by HarperCollins, with Halpern remaining at the head. Since 2000, Ecco has published the yearly anthology The Best American Science Writing, edited by Jesse Cohen. In 2011, Ecco created two separate publishing lines, one "curated" by chef-author Anthony Bourdain and the other by novelist Dennis Lehane.

== History ==
Halpern founded Ecco Press in 1971, originally to publish the literary magazine Antaeus (which folded in 1994). Ecco's name was suggested by Halpern's initial backer, ketchup heiress Drue Heinz. Initially, Ecco specialized in reissues and paperback editions of hardcovers previously published by other companies, including works by Paul Bowles, Cormac McCarthy, Charles Bukowski, and John Fante. It also published such noteworthy titles as Bells in Winter, a 1978 poetry collection by Czeslaw Milosz, who won the Nobel Prize in Literature in 1980, and Madhur Jaffrey's An Invitation to Indian Cooking. In 1991, Heinz transferred ownership to Halpern. Ecco Press remained independent, although affiliated with Viking Press and W.W. Norton & Company for sales and distribution, until its acquisition by HarperCollins in 1999.

Notable titles published by Ecco since 1999 include the paperback edition of Anthony Bourdain's Kitchen Confidential: Adventures in the Culinary Underbelly and Patti Smith's memoir, Just Kids. Currently, Ecco releases between 35 and 40 titles a year, usually a mixture of literary novels, biographies, memoirs, and culinary titles, by authors such as Joyce Carol Oates, Richard Ford, T. C. Boyle, Amy Tan, Margaret Atwood, Jonathan Lethem, Jelani Cobb, Simon Schama, Richard Dawkins, Russell Banks, Vendela Vida, Jorie Graham, Mario Batali, Daniel Boulud, and April Bloomfield.

In September 2011, Ecco announced that Anthony Bourdain would have his own publishing line, which would include acquiring three to five titles per year that "reflect his remarkably eclectic tastes." In describing the line, Bourdain said: "This will be a line of books for people with strong voices who are good at something—who speak with authority. Discern nothing from this initial list—other than a general affection for people who cook food and like food. The ability to kick people in the head is just as compelling to us—as long as that's coupled with an ability to vividly describe the experience. We are just as intent on crossing genres as we are enthusiastic about our first three authors. It only gets weirder from here."

In October 2011, Ecco announced that Dennis Lehane would have his own eponymous publishing line, acquiring "... literary fiction with a dark urban edge". One of the initial books in the line was Ivy Pochoda's Visitation Street.

In 2020, it was announced that founding editor Daniel Halpern would move to an editor at large position; in 2021, fifty years after founding Ecco Press, Halpern joined Alfred A. Knopf as executive editor.

== Selected awards ==
Year	Award	Category	Title	Author
2022	National Book Award	Nonfiction	South to America	Imani Perry
2020	Pulitzer Prize	Biography	Sontag: Her Life and Work	Benjamin Moser
2017	Los Angeles Times Book Prize	Mystery	A Book of American Martyrs	Joyce Carol Oates
2015	Los Angeles Times Book Prize	Poetry	From the New World: Poems 1976–2014	Jorie Graham
2010	National Book Award	Nonfiction	Just Kids	Patti Smith
2008	Pulitzer Prize	Poetry	Time and Materials	Robert Hass
2008	PEN/Robert W. Bingham Prize	First Novel	The Septembers of Shiraz	Dalia Sofer
2006	National Book Critics Circle Award	General Nonfiction	Rough Crossings	Simon Schama
1996	Pulitzer Prize	Poetry	The Dream of the Unified Field	Jorie Graham
1994	National Book Award	Poetry	Worshipful Company of Fletchers	James Tate
1993	Pulitzer Prize	Poetry	The Wild Iris	Louise Glück
1984	National Book Critics Circle Award	Criticism	Twentieth Century Pleasures: Prose on Poetry	Robert Hass
1980	Nobel Prize	Literature	Nobel Prize in Literature	Czeslaw Milosz
