= Joyce Carol Oates =

American author (born 1938)

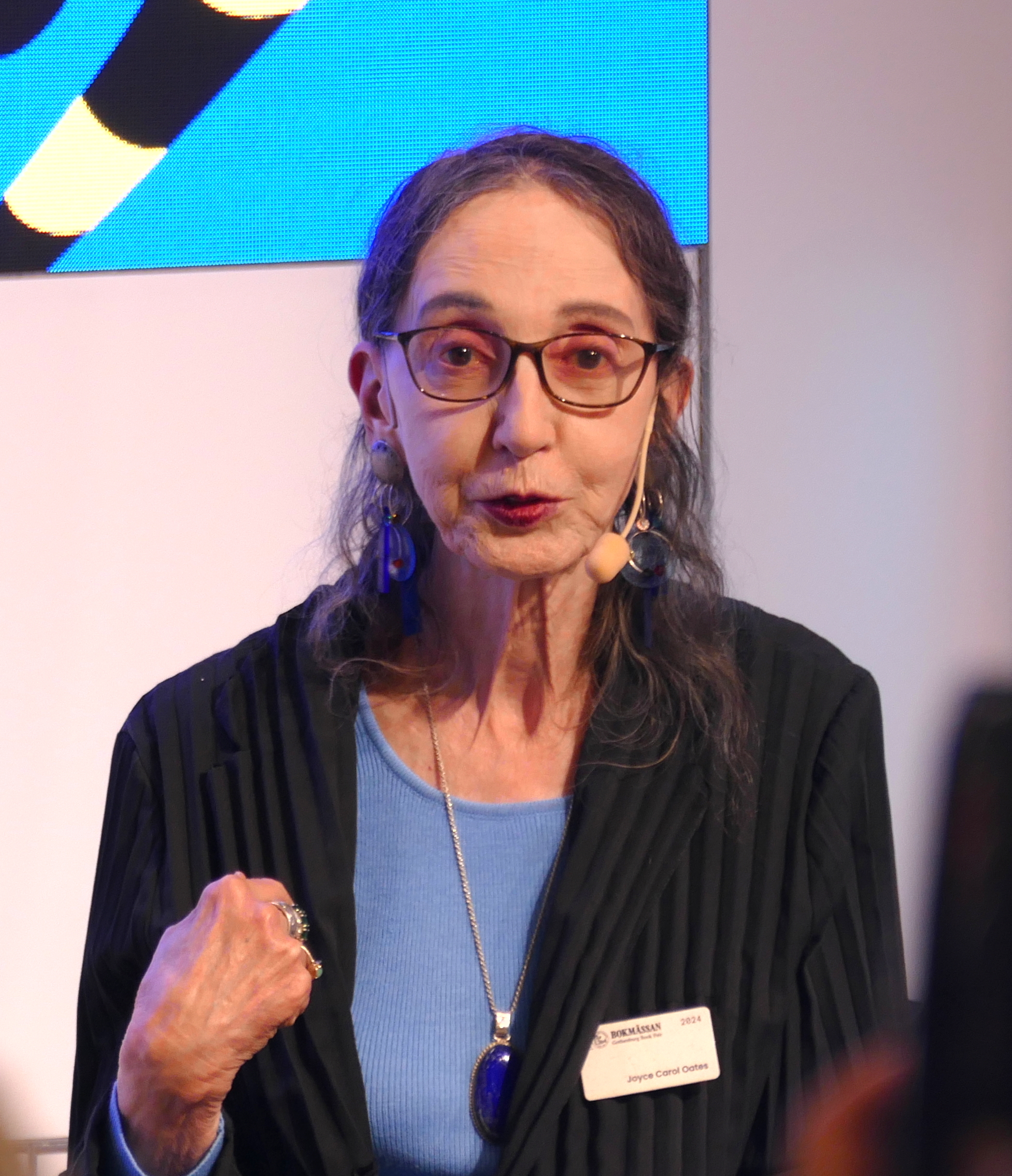
- Oates in 2024
- Born: June 16, 1938 (age 88); Lockport, New York, U.S.
- Education: Syracuse University (BA); University of Wisconsin, Madison (MA); Rice University
- Occupations: Novelist; short story writer; playwright; poet; literary critic; professor; editor
- Spouses: Raymond J. Smith (m. 1961; died 2008); Charles G. Gross (m. 2009; died 2019)
- Writing career
- Period: 1963–present
- Notable works: A Garden of Earthly Delights (1967); Them (1969); The Wheel of Love (1970); Wonderland (1971); Black Water (1992); Blonde (2000); High Lonesome: New & Selected Stories, 1966–2006 (2006)
- Notable awards: O. Henry Award (1967); National Book Award (1970); O. Henry Award (1973); National Humanities Medal (2010); Stone Award for Lifetime Literary Achievement (2012); Jerusalem Prize (2019)

Joyce Carol Oates (born June 16, 1938) is an American writer. Oates published her first book in 1963, and has since published 58 novels, a number of plays and novellas, and many volumes of short stories, poetry, and nonfiction. Her novels Black Water (1992), What I Lived For (1994), and Blonde (2000), and her short story collection Lovely, Dark, Deep: Stories (2014) were each finalists for the Pulitzer Prize. She has won many awards for her writing, including the National Book Award for her novel Them (1969), two O. Henry Awards, the National Humanities Medal, and the Jerusalem Prize (2019).

Oates taught at Princeton University from 1978 to 2014, and is the Roger S. Berlind '52 Professor Emerita in the Humanities with the Program in Creative Writing. From 2016 to 2020, she was a visiting professor at the University of California, Berkeley, where she taught short fiction in the spring semesters. She now teaches at Rutgers University, New Brunswick.

== Early life and education ==
Oates was born in Lockport, New York, the eldest of three children of Carolina (née Bush), a homemaker of Hungarian descent, and Frederic James Oates, a tool and die designer. She grew up on her parents' farm outside the town.

Her brother, Fred Jr., and sister, Lynn Ann, were born in 1943 and 1956, respectively. Lynn Ann has autism and is institutionalized, and (as of 2015) Oates has not seen her since 1971. Oates grew up in the working-class farming community of Millersport, New York. She characterized hers as "a happy, close-knit and unextraordinary family for our time, place and economic status", but her childhood as "a daily scramble for existence".

Her widowed paternal grandmother, Blanche Woodside (née Morningstar), lived with the family and was "very close" to Joyce. After Blanche's death, Joyce learned that Blanche's father had killed himself. She also found out that Blanche was Jewish who hid her identity in order to escape persecution and chose not to disclose this to Oates. Oates eventually drew on aspects of her grandmother's life in writing the novel The Gravedigger's Daughter (2007).

Violence marred the lives of Oates and her recent ancestors: Oates' biological maternal grandfather was murdered in 1917, which led to Oates' mother's informal adoption. At age fourteen, Oates' paternal grandmother Blanche survived an attempted murder-suicide at the hands of her own father. He did kill himself. When Oates was a child, her next-door neighbor pleaded guilty to charges of arson and attempted murder of his family, and was sentenced to a prison term at Attica Correctional Facility.

Oates attended the same one-room school her mother had attended as a child. She became interested in reading at an early age and remembers Blanche's gift of Lewis Carroll's Alice's Adventures in Wonderland (1865) as "the great treasure of my childhood, and the most profound literary influence of my life. This was love at first sight!" In her early teens, she read the work of Charlotte Brontë, Emily Brontë, Fyodor Dostoevsky, William Faulkner, Ernest Hemingway, and Henry David Thoreau, writers whose "influences remain very deep".

Oates began writing at the age of 14, when Blanche gave her a typewriter. Oates later transferred to several bigger, suburban schools and graduated from Williamsville South High School in 1956, where she worked for her high school newspaper. She was the first in her family to complete high school.

As a teen, Oates also received early recognition for her writing by winning a Scholastic Art and Writing Award.

== University ==
Oates earned a scholarship to attend Syracuse University, where she joined the Phi Mu fraternity for women. She found Syracuse to be "a very exciting place academically and intellectually", and trained herself by "writing novel after novel and always throwing them out when I completed them". It was at this point that Oates began reading the work of Franz Kafka, D. H. Lawrence, Thomas Mann, and Flannery O'Connor, and she noted, "these influences are still quite strong, pervasive".

At the age of 19, she won the "college short story" contest sponsored by Mademoiselle. Oates was elected to Phi Beta Kappa as a junior and graduated valedictorian from Syracuse University with a B.A. summa cum laude in English in 1960, and received her M.A. from the University of Wisconsin–Madison in 1961. She was a Ph.D. student at Rice University but left to become a full-time writer.

Evelyn Shrifte, president of the Vanguard Press, met Oates soon after Oates received her master's degree. "She was fresh out of school, and I thought she was a genius", Shrifte said. Vanguard published Oates' first book, the short-story collection By the North Gate, in 1963.

== Career ==
In 1964, the Vanguard Press published Oates' first novel, With Shuddering Fall, when she was 26 years old. In 1966, she published "Where Are You Going, Where Have You Been?", a short story dedicated to Bob Dylan and written after listening to his song "It's All Over Now, Baby Blue". The story is loosely based on the serial killer Charles Schmid, also known as "The Pied Piper of Tucson". It has been anthologized many times and adapted as a 1985 film, Smooth Talk, which starred Laura Dern. In 2008, Oates said that of all her published work, she is most noted for "Where Are You Going, Where Have You Been?"

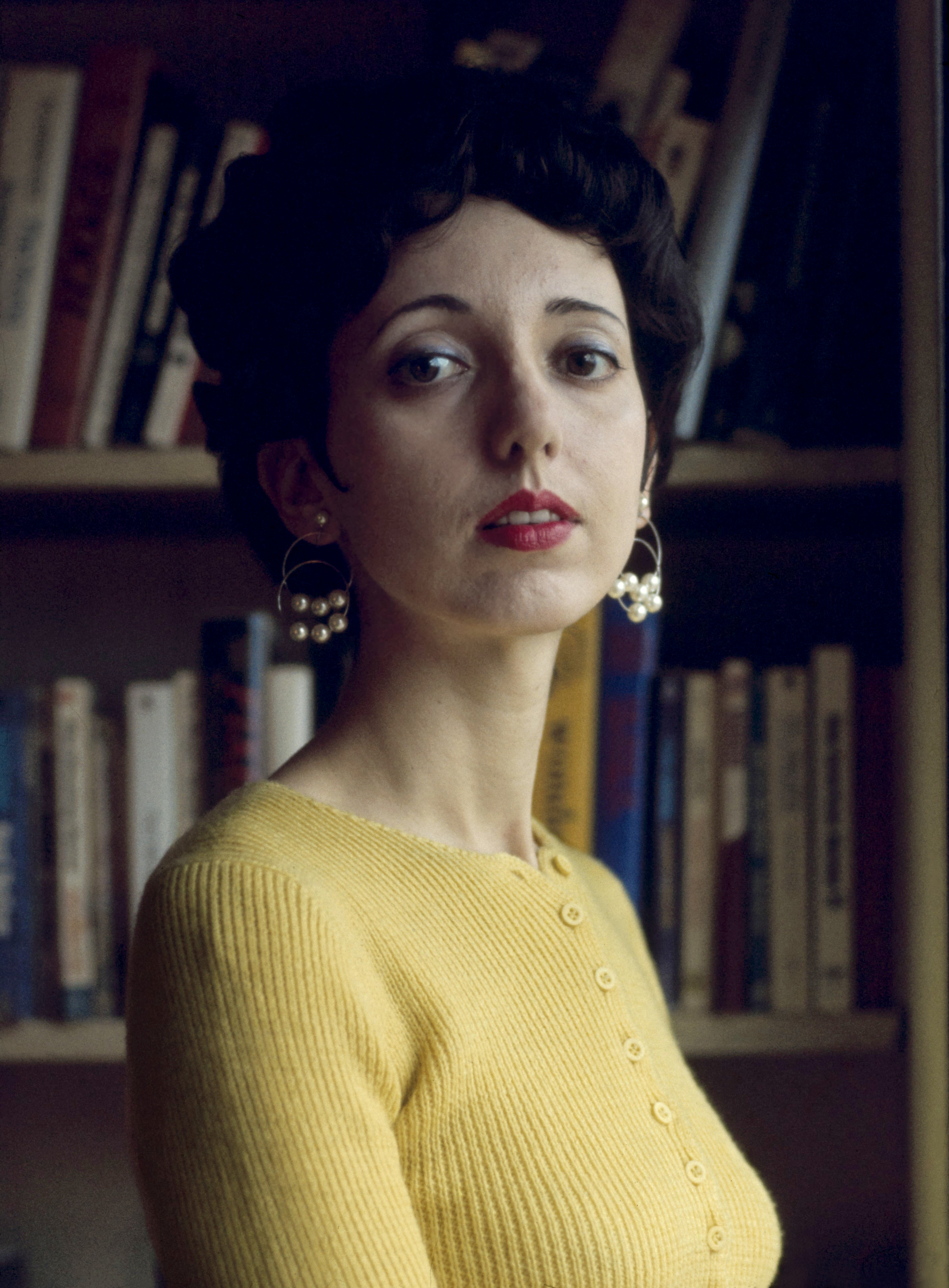
Oates in 1972, while in Canada

Another early short story, "In the Region of Ice" (Atlantic Monthly, August 1966), features a young, gifted Jewish-American student. It dramatizes his drift into protest against the world of education and the sober, established society of his parents; his depression and eventual murder-suicide. It was inspired by a real-life incident (as were several of her works) and Oates had been acquainted with the model of her protagonist. She revisited this subject in the title story of her collection Last Days: Stories (1984). "In the Region of Ice" won the first of her two O. Henry Awards.

Oates's second novel was A Garden of Earthly Delights (1967), first of the so-called Wonderland Quartet published by Vanguard 1967–71. All were finalists for the annual National Book Award. The third novel in the series, them (1969), won the 1970 National Book Award for Fiction. It is set in Detroit during a time span from the 1930s to the 1960s, most of it in black ghetto neighborhoods, and deals openly with crime, drugs, and racial and class conflicts. Again, some of the key characters and events were based on real people whom Oates had known or heard of during her years in the city.

Since then, she has published an average of two books a year. Frequent topics in her work include rural poverty, sexual abuse, class tensions, desire for power, female childhood and adolescence, and occasionally the "fantastic". Violence is a constant in her work, even leading Oates to have written an essay in response to the question: "Why Is Your Writing So Violent?"

In the early 1980s, Oates began writing stories in the Gothic and horror genres; in her foray into these genres, Oates said she was "deeply influenced" by Kafka and felt "a writerly kinship" with James Joyce.

In 1990, Oates discussed her novel, Because It Is Bitter, and Because It Is My Heart, which also deals with themes of racial tension, and described "the experience of writing [it]" as "so intense it seemed almost electric". She is a fan of poet and novelist Sylvia Plath, describing Plath's sole novel The Bell Jar as a "near perfect work of art", but though Oates has often been compared to Plath, she disavows Plath's romanticism about suicide, and among her characters, she favors cunning, hardy survivors, both women and men.

In 1996, Oates published We Were the Mulvaneys, a novel following the disintegration of an American family, which became a best-seller after being selected by Oprah's Book Club in 2001. We Were the Mulvaneys was eventually turned into a TV movie, which was nominated for several awards. In the 1990s and early 2000s, Oates wrote several books, mostly suspense novels, under the pen names Rosamond Smith and Lauren Kelly.

Since at least the early 1980s, Oates has been rumored to be a favorite to win the Nobel Prize in Literature by oddsmakers and critics. Her papers, held at Syracuse University, include 17 unpublished short stories and four unpublished or unfinished novellas. Oates has said that most of her early unpublished work was "cheerfully thrown away".

One review of Oates's 1970 story collection The Wheel of Love characterized her as an author "of considerable talent" but at that time "far from being a great writer".

Oates's 2006 short story "Landfill" was criticized because it drew on the death, several months earlier, of John A. Fiocco Jr., a 19-year-old New Jersey college student.

In 1998, Oates received the F. Scott Fitzgerald Award for Achievement in American Literature, which is given annually to recognize outstanding achievement in American literature.

In The Frenzy, released in June 2026, Oates' fiction is a collection of psychologically suspenseful short stories.

=== Ontario Review ===
Oates founded The Ontario Review, a literary magazine, in 1974 in Canada, with Raymond J. Smith, her husband and fellow graduate student, who would eventually become a professor of 18th-century literature. Smith served as editor of this venture, and Oates served as associate editor. The magazine's mission, according to Smith, the editor, was to bridge the literary and artistic culture of the US and Canada: "We tried to do this by publishing writers and artists from both countries, as well as essays and reviews of an intercultural nature." In 1978, Sylvester & Orphanos published A Sentimental Education, a collection of short stories.

In 1980, Oates and Smith founded Ontario Review Books, an independent publishing house. In 2004, Oates described the partnership as "a marriage of like minds – both my husband and I are so interested in literature and we read the same books; he'll be reading a book and then I'll read it – we trade and we talk about our reading at meal times ...".

=== Teaching career ===
Oates taught in Beaumont, Texas, for a year, then moved to Detroit in 1962, where she began teaching at the University of Detroit. Influenced by the Vietnam War, the 1967 Detroit race riots, and a job offer, Oates moved across the river into Canada in 1968 with her husband, to a teaching position at the University of Windsor in Ontario. In 1978, she moved to Princeton, New Jersey, and began teaching at Princeton University.

Among others, Oates influenced Jonathan Safran Foer, who took an introductory writing course with Oates in 1995 as a Princeton undergraduate. Foer recalled later that Oates took an interest in his writing and his "most important of writerly qualities, energy", noting that she was "the first person to ever make me think I should try to write in any sort of serious way. And my life really changed after that." Oates served as advisor for Foer's senior thesis, which was an early version of his novel Everything Is Illuminated (published to acclaim in 2002).

Oates retired from teaching at Princeton in 2014 and was honored at a retirement party in November of that year.

Oates has taught creative short fiction at UC Berkeley since 2016 and offers her course in spring semesters.

== Views ==
=== Religion ===
Oates was raised Catholic, but as of 2007 she identified as an atheist. In an interview with Commonweal magazine, Oates stated: "I think of religion as a kind of psychological manifestation of deep powers, deep imaginative, mysterious powers which are always with us."

=== Politics ===
Oates supports gun control. She was a vocal critic of US President Donald Trump and his policies during his first term, both in public and on Twitter.

Oates opposed the shuttering of cultural institutions on Trump's first inauguration day as a protest against the President, stating that this "would only hurt artists. Rather, cultural institutions should be sanctuaries for those repelled by the inauguration."

In January 2019, Oates stated that "Trump is like a figurehead, but I think what really controls everything is just a few really wealthy families or corporations."

On November 8, 2025, Oates took to X (formerly Twitter), posting a critique of a user that most readers assumed to be X owner Elon Musk, though he is not named specifically. Her critique read

"So curious that such a wealthy man never posts anything that indicates that he enjoys or is even aware of what virtually everyone appreciates— scenes from nature, pet dog or cat, praise for a movie, music, a book (but doubt that he reads); pride in a friend's or relative's accomplishment; condolences for someone who has died; pleasure in sports, acclaim for a favorite team; references to history. In fact he seems totally uneducated, uncultured. The poorest persons on Twitter may have access to more beauty & meaning in life than the 'most wealthy person in the world.'"

Extensive online discourse ensued, with coverage of the "feud" published in Newsweek, Forbes, Slate, Literary Hub, and other periodicals. LitHub's story included the headline "Elon Musk Gets Roasted on His Own Platform by Joyce Carol Oates," observing that Oates' post gets "...at the heart of Elon's broken humanity, itemizing with a surgeon's precision that which he has so clearly lost, and will likely never regain." Musk replied with a flurry of posts critiquing Oates' body of literary work and her use of punctuation in the original critical post, as well as seemingly adjusting the tone and content of subsequent posts in the following weeks to include more references to his media consumption and coworkers.

== Productivity ==
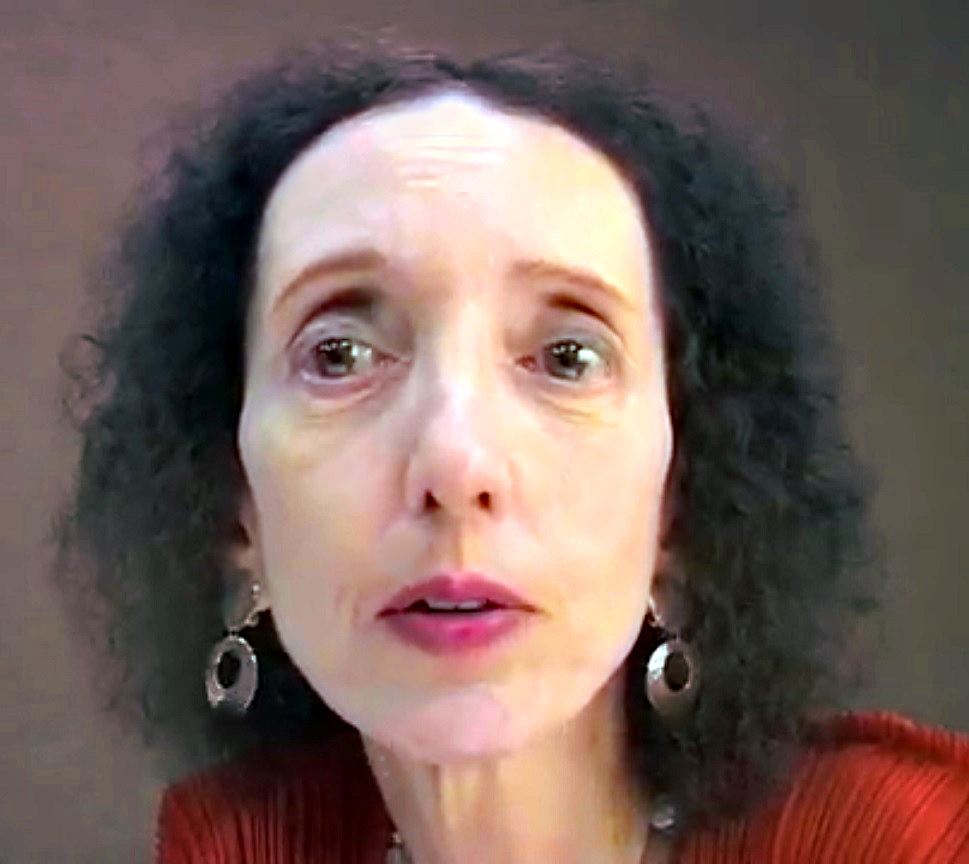
Oates in 2004

Oates writes in longhand, working from "8 till 1 every day, then again for two or three hours in the evening." Her prolificacy has become one of her best-known attributes, although often discussed disparagingly. The New York Times wrote in 1989 that Oates's "name is synonymous with productivity." Martyn Bedford wrote in Literary Review that "perhaps she is a victim of her own productivity." In 2004, The Guardian noted that, "Nearly every review of an Oates book, it seems, begins with a list [of her publication totals]".

In a journal entry written in the 1970s, Oates sarcastically addressed her critics, writing, "So many books! so many! Obviously JCO has a full career behind her, if one chooses to look at it that way; many more titles and she might as well... what?... give up all hopes for a 'reputation'? [...] but I work hard, and long, and as the hours roll by I seem to create more than I anticipate; more, certainly, than the literary world allows for a 'serious' writer. Yet I have more stories to tell, and more novels [...] ". In The New York Review of Books in 2007, Michael Dirda suggested that disparaging criticism of Oates "derives from reviewer's angst: How does one judge a new book by Oates when one is not familiar with most of the backlist? Where does one start?"

Several publications have published lists of what they deem the best Joyce Carol Oates books, designed to help introduce readers to the author's daunting body of work. In a 2003 article entitled "Joyce Carol Oates for dummies", The Rocky Mountain News recommended starting with her early short stories and the novels A Garden of Earthly Delights (1967), them (1969), Wonderland (1971), Black Water (1992), and Blonde (2000).

In 2006, The Times listed them, On Boxing (1987), Black Water, and High Lonesome: New & Selected Stories, 1966–2006 (2006) as "The Pick of Joyce Carol Oates". In 2007, Entertainment Weekly listed its Oates favorites as Wonderland, Black Water, Blonde, I'll Take You There (2002), and The Falls (2004). In 2003, Oates herself said that she thinks she will be remembered for, and would most want a first-time Oates reader to read, them and Blonde, although she "could as easily have chosen a number of titles."

In a 2025 interview with The New Yorker, the novelist Garth Risk Hallberg suggested that "a new [Oates] reader should begin with the collection High Lonesome." He also deemed the novels them, I Lock My Door Upon Myself (1990), and Blonde "essential" Oates works.

== Personal life ==
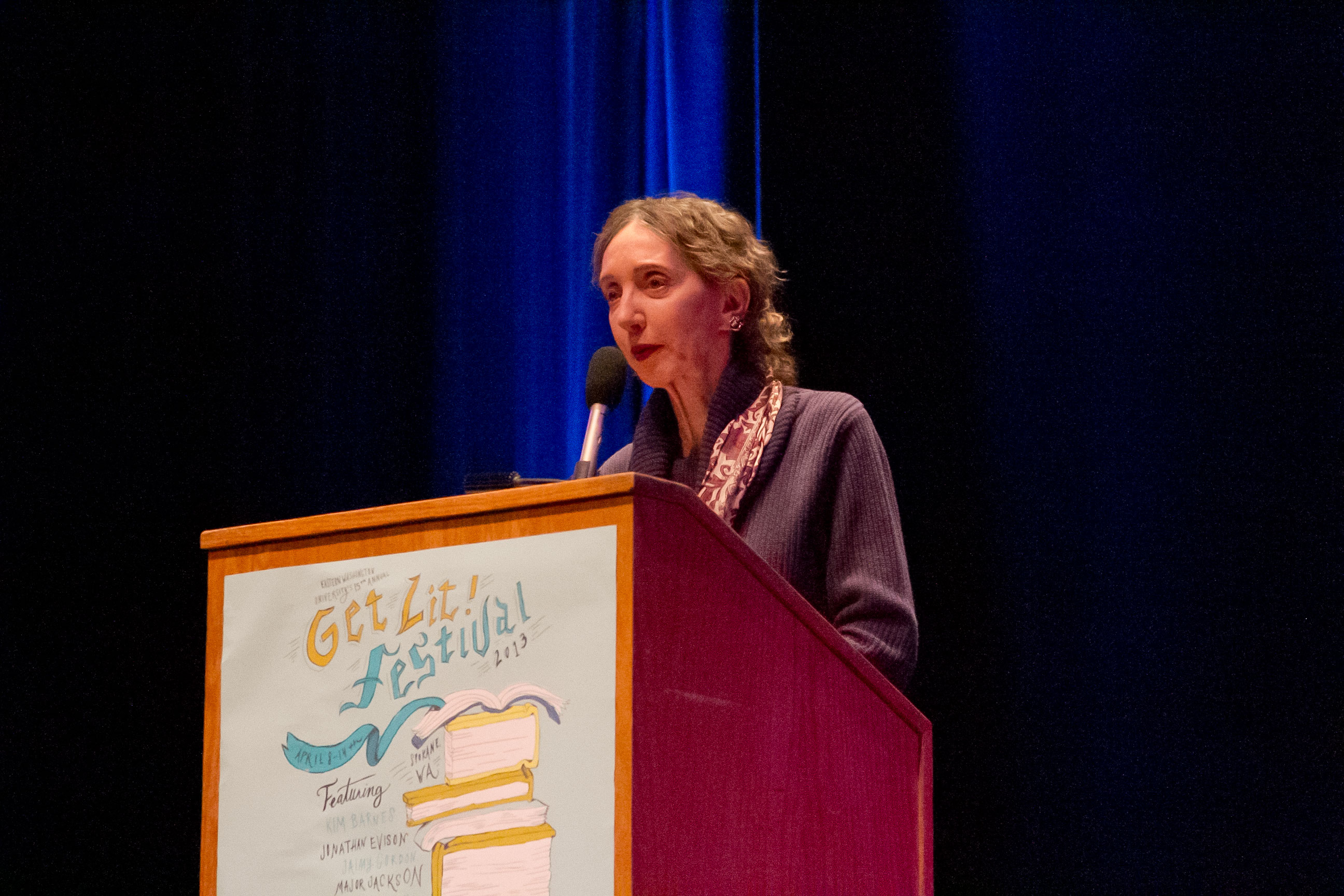
Oates in 2013

Oates met Raymond J. Smith, a fellow graduate student, at the University of Wisconsin–Madison, and they married in 1961. Smith became a professor of 18th-century literature and, later, an editor and publisher. Oates described the partnership as "a marriage of like minds..." and "a very collaborative and imaginative marriage". Smith died of complications from pneumonia on February 18, 2008, and the death affected Oates profoundly.

In April 2008, Oates wrote to an interviewer, "Since my husband's unexpected death, I really have very little energy [...] My marriage – my love for my husband – seems to have come first in my life, rather than my writing. Set beside his death, the future of my writing scarcely interests me at the moment."

After six months of near suicidal grieving for Smith, Oates met Charles G. Gross, a professor in the Psychology Department and Neuroscience Institute at Princeton, at a dinner party at her home. In early 2009, Oates and Gross were married. On April 13, 2019, Oates announced via Twitter that Gross had died at the age of 83.

As a diarist, Oates began keeping a detailed journal in 1973, documenting her personal and literary life; it eventually grew to "more than 4,000 single-spaced typewritten pages". In 2008, Oates said she had "moved away from keeping a formal journal" and instead preserved copies of her e-mails.

As of 1999, Oates remained devoted to running, of which she has written: "Ideally, the runner who's a writer is running through the land- and cityscapes of her fiction, like a ghost in a real setting." While running, Oates mentally envisions scenes in her novels and works out structural problems in already-written drafts; she formulated the germ of her novel You Must Remember This (1987) while running, when she "glanced up and saw the ruins of a railroad bridge", which reminded her of "a mythical upstate New York city in the right place".

Oates was a member of the board of trustees of the John Simon Guggenheim Memorial Foundation from 1997 to 2016. She is an honorary member of the Simpson Literary Project, which annually awards the $50,000 Simpson/Joyce Carol Oates Literary Prize to a mid-career writer. She has served as the Project's artist-in-residence several times.

== Bibliography ==
Oates's extensive bibliography contains poetry, plays, criticism, short stories, eleven novellas, and sixty novels, including them, Blonde, Because It Is Bitter, and Because It Is My Heart, Black Water, Mudwoman, Carthage, The Man Without a Shadow, and A Book of American Martyrs. She has published several novels under the pseudonyms Rosamond Smith and Lauren Kelly.

=== "Faction" ===
Oates is as diverse as she is driven. She has tackled topics ranging from the aesthetics of boxing to the misadventures of toxic twins. But rarely is she so intriguing as when she strays into a genre best described as ‘faction.’ It’s as unsettling as it is worthwhile to take a fresh look at a much-publicized event or personality through Oates’ eyes.

— The Times of London

Many of Oates's novels and stories fictionalize historical events, in a mode the Times of London calls "a genre best described as faction." Examples include:

Title	Historical analogue
"Where Are You Going, Where Have You Been?" (1966) [short story]	the Charles Schmid serial killings
"The Triumph of the Spider Monkey" (1974) [novella]	the life and crimes of Charles Manson
Black Water (1992)	the Chappaquiddick incident
Zombie (1995)	the life and crimes of Jeffrey Dahmer
Blonde (2000)	the life and death of Norma Jeane Baker/Marilyn Monroe
"Fat Man My Love" (2004) [short story]	Alfred Hitchcock, Tippi Hedren, and the tempestuous production of The Birds
"Dear Husband," (2008) [short story]	the child murders committed by Andrea Yates
The Sacrifice (2015)	the Tawana Brawley rape hoax
"The Suicide" (2023) [short story]	the suicide of David Foster Wallace

== Awards and honors ==
=== Winner ===
- 1955–1956: Scholastic Art & Writing Award
- 1967: O. Henry Award – "In the Region of Ice"
- 1968: M. L. Rosenthal Award, National Institute of Arts and Letters – A Garden of Earthly Delights
- 1970: National Book Award for Fiction – them
- 1973: O. Henry Award – "The Dead"
- 1988: St. Louis Literary Award from the Saint Louis University Library Associates
- 1990: Rea Award for the Short Story
- 1990: Heideman Award for Tone Clusters
- 1994: Bram Stoker Award Lifetime Achievement award
- 1994: International Horror Guild Award, best Collection, for Angels and Visitations
- 1996: Bram Stoker Award for Best Novel – Zombie
- 1996: PEN/Malamud Award for Excellence in the Art of the Short Story
- 1997: Golden Plate Award, American Academy of Achievement
- 2002: Peggy V. Helmerich Distinguished Author Award
- 2003: Common Wealth Award of Distinguished Service for Literature
- 2003: Kenyon Review Award for Literary Achievement (The Kenyon Review)
- 2005: Prix Femina Etranger – The Falls
- 2006: Chicago Tribune Literary Prize (Chicago Tribune)
- 2006: Honorary Doctor of Humane Letters, Mount Holyoke College
- 2006: National Magazine Awards (Fiction) - Smother
- 2007: Humanist of the Year, American Humanist Association
- 2009: Ivan Sandrof Award for Lifetime Achievement, NBCC
- 2010: National Humanities Medal
- 2010: Fernanda Pivano Award
- 2011: Honorary Doctor of Arts, University of Pennsylvania
- 2011: World Fantasy Award for Best Short Fiction – Fossil-Figures
- 2011: Bram Stoker Award for Best Fiction Collection – The Corn Maiden and Other Nightmares
- 2012: Stone Award for Lifetime Literary Achievement, Oregon State University
- 2012: Norman Mailer Prize, Lifetime Achievement
- 2012: Bram Stoker Award for Best Fiction Collection – Black Dahlia and White Rose: Stories
- 2012: New York State Writers Hall of Fame Class of 2012
- 2016: International Thriller Writers Awards (Short Story) - Gun Accident: An Investigation
- 2016: Bram Stoker Award (Fiction Collection) - The Doll-Master and Other Tales of Terror
- 2016: Bram Stoker Award (Short Fiction) - The Crawl Space - Won
- 2016: elected to the American Philosophical Society
- 2017: International Thriller Writers Awards (Short Story) - Big Momma
- 2017: Los Angeles Times Book Prize, best Mystery/Thrillers, for A Book of American Martyrs
- 2019: Jerusalem Prize, Lifetime Achievement
- 2020: Prix mondial Cino Del Duca, work as a message of modern humanism
- 2023: Taobuk Award, for high-profile personalities in the literary, artistic and civic worlds
- 2024: Honorary Doctor of the Humane Letters, Princeton University
- 2024: Fitzgerald Prize, France

=== Finalist ===
- 1993: Pulitzer Prize for Fiction – Black Water
- 1995: Pulitzer Prize for Fiction – What I Lived For
- 2001: Pulitzer Prize for Fiction – Blonde
- 2015: Pulitzer Prize for Fiction – Lovely, Dark, Deep: Stories
- 2015: Killer Nashville Awards (Silver Falchion Award - Collection) - High Crime Area: Tales of Darkness and Dread

=== Nominated ===
- 1963: O. Henry Award – Special Award for Continuing Achievement (1970), five Second Prize (1964 to 1989), two First Prize (above) among 29 nominations
- 1968: National Book Award for Fiction – A Garden of Earthly Delights
- 1969: National Book Award for Fiction – Expensive People
- 1972: National Book Award for Fiction – Wonderland
- 1980: Los Angeles Times Book Prize, Best Fiction, for Bellefleur
- 1987: Los Angeles Times Book Prize, Best Fiction, for You Must Remember This
- 1990: National Book Award for Fiction – Because It Is Bitter, and Because It Is My Heart
- 1992: National Book Critics Circle Award, Fiction – Black Water
- 1995: PEN/Faulkner Award – What I Lived For
- 1995: Locus Award (Collection) - Haunted: Tales of the Grotesque
- 1995: World Fantasy Award (Collection) for Haunted: Tales of the Grotesque
- 1997: Locus Award (Anthology) - American Gothic Tales
- 1998: International Horror Guild Award, best Collection, for The Collector of Hearts: New Tales of the Grotesque
- 2000: National Book Award – Blonde
- 2000: Bram Stoker Award (Long Fiction) - In Shock
- 2001: Locus Award (Novelette) - In Shock
- 2001: International Horror Guild Award, best Short Fiction, for Angel of Mercy
- 2002: Los Angeles Book Prize, Best Young Adult Novel, for Big Mouth & Ugly Girl
- 2003: Bram Stoker Award (Short Fiction) - The Haunting
- 2003: Edgar Allan Poe Award for Best Short Story - Angel of Wrath
- 2003: International Horror Guild Award (Long Fiction) for Rape: A Love Story
- 2007: National Book Critics Circle Award, Fiction – The Gravedigger's Daughter
- 2007: National Book Critics Circle Award, Memoir/Autobiography – The Journal of Joyce Carol Oates: 1973–1982
- 2008: Macavity Awards (Sue Feder Memorial Award For Best Historical Mystery) - The Gravedigger's Daughter
- 2008: Shirley Jackson Award (Collection) - Wild Nights!
- 2011: International Dublin Literary Award - Little Bird of Heaven
- 2011: Shirley Jackson Award (Single-Author Collection) - The Corn Maiden and Other Nightmares
- 2013: Frank O'Connor International Short Story Award for Black Dahlia and White Rose: Stories
- 2013: Goodreads Choice Awards (Best Horror) for The Accursed.
- 2013: Shirley Jackson Award (Novel) - The Accursed
- 2017: Edgar Allan Poe Award for Best Short Story - The Crawl Space
- 2017: Macavity Awards (Mystery Short Story) - The Crawl Space
- 2021: Goodreads Choice Awards (Best Poetry) for American Melancholy: Poems
