= Deaths in February 2008 =

The following is a list of notable deaths in February 2008.

Entries for each day are listed alphabetically by surname. A typical entry lists information in the following sequence:

- Name, age, country of citizenship at birth, subsequent country of citizenship (if applicable), reason for notability, cause of death (if known), and reference.

== February 2008 ==
=== 1 ===
- Hélio Quaglia Barbosa, 66, Brazilian member of the Superior Court of Justice, multiple organ failure.
- Norman Bleehen, 77, British oncologist.
- Floyd Boring, 92, American Secret Service agent, helped foil Truman assassination attempt, heart attack.
- Beto Carrero, 70, Brazilian theme park owner (Beto Carrero World), endocarditis.
- Al DeMao, 87, American football center for the Washington Redskins (1945–1953).
- Ralph DiGia, 93, American World War II conscientious objector and peace activist with War Resisters League, pneumonia.
- Allan Grant, 88, American photojournalist for Life magazine.
- Earl Greenburg, 61, American head of NBC daytime, melanoma.
- Frank Fletcher Hamilton, 86, Canadian World War II pilot and politician.
- Russi Karanjia, 95, Indian journalist, editor of Blitz.
- Władysław Kawula, 70, Polish footballer.
- Shell Kepler, 49, American actress (General Hospital, Three's Company) and fashion designer (HSC), renal failure.
- Tony Silver, 82, American documentary filmmaker known for directing the film Style Wars.
- Ralph Wallace, 58, American politician, member of the Texas State House (1977–1992).

=== 2 ===
- Gus Arriola, 90, American cartoonist (Gordo), Parkinson's disease.
- Billy Balbastro, 67, Filipino journalist and broadcaster, cancer.
- Ahmad Bourghani, 48, Iranian politician, heart failure.
- Earl Butz, 98, American politician, Secretary of Agriculture (1971–1976).
- Heinrich Dahlinger, 85, German field handball player, entrepreneur, kidney failure.
- Joshua Lederberg, 82, American Nobel Prize–winning molecular biologist.
- Barry Morse, 89, British-born Canadian actor (The Fugitive, Space: 1999).
- Katoucha Niane, 47, French supermodel and women's rights activist, drowning.
- Sir David Orr, 85, British businessman.
- Daoud Soumain, Chadian general, Army Chief of Staff, killed during the Battle of N'Djamena.
- Roger Testu, 94, French cartoonist.
- Ed Vargo, 79, American baseball umpire.
- Edward Wilson, 60, British actor (When the Boat Comes In), director of the National Youth Theatre, cancer.

=== 3 ===
- Cyril Stanley Bamberger, 88, British Royal Air Force pilot.
- Samuel Boyle, 59, American bureau chief (New York City) of Associated Press (1981–2002), lung cancer.
- Charles Fernley Fawcett, 92, American adventurer, actor and freedom fighter.
- Ernesto Illy, 82, Italian food chemist and chairman of the illy coffee company.
- Sigurveig Jónsdóttir, 77, Icelandic actress, natural causes.
- Jorge Liderman, 50, Argentine-American composer, suicide by train.
- Jackie Orszaczky, 59, Hungarian-born Australian musician, cancer.
- Geoffrey Paish, 86, British tennis player and administrator.
- Algirdas Ražauskas, 55, Lithuanian politician.
- Cornelius L. Reid, 96, American vocal pedagogue.
- John Elliott Smart, 91, British submariner.
- Charley van de Weerd, 86, Dutch football player.

=== 4 ===
- Chris Anderson, 81, American jazz pianist, complications from a stroke.
- Endel Aruja, 96, Estonian physicist.
- Sheldon Brown, 63, American bicycle mechanic and technical authority, heart attack.
- Larry Cruz, 66, Filipino journalist and restaurateur, pneumonia and complications from cancer.
- Augusta Dabney, 89, American actress (A World Apart, Running on Empty, The Paper).
- Tata Güines, 77, Cuban percussionist, kidney infection.
- Rose Hacker, 101, British activist.
- Richard Ho, 81, Malaysian civil servant.
- Harry Richard Landis, 108, American second-to-last World War I veteran.
- Stefan Meller, 65, Polish diplomat, foreign minister (2005–2006).
- Bertha Moss, 88, Argentine actor, cardiac arrest.
- Nikolay Popov, 76, Russian chief designer of T-80 tank, after long illness.
- John Snodgrass, 79, British diplomat.
- Peter Thomas, Baron Thomas of Gwydir, 87, British Conservative Party chairman (1970–1972), Welsh Secretary (1970–1974).

=== 5 ===
- Sayed Nafees al-Hussaini, 74, Pakistani calligrapher.
- Zoran Antonijević, 62, Serbian soccer plater.
- Schoolboy Cleve, 82, American blues musician, harmonica and guitar player.
- Karl Ehrhardt, 83, American New York Mets fan known for his signs in the crowd.
- Ken Konz, 79, American football defensive back (Cleveland Browns), pneumonia.
- Maharishi Mahesh Yogi, 90, Indian founder of Transcendental Meditation movement, former guru to The Beatles.
- Vitaliy Ponomarenko, 33, Ukrainian powerlifting champion, heart condition.
- Winston Walls, 65, American musician, heart failure and diabetes.

=== 6 ===
- John Alvin, 59, American film poster artist (Star Wars, Blade Runner, E.T. the Extra-Terrestrial), heart attack.
- Phyllis Barnhart, 85, American animator (The Secret of NIMH).
- Charles Borck, 91, Filipino Olympic basketball player and coach.
- George W. Dunaway, 85, United States Army soldier who served as the second Sergeant Major of the Army.
- Nikol Faridani, 72, Iranian aerial photographer, prostate cancer.
- Oliver Foot, 61, British President of Orbis International.
- John Grimsley, 45, American football linebacker (Houston Oilers, Miami Dolphins), accidental gunshot.
- Andrew Harwood, 62, Australian radio and TV presenter (It's Academic, Jeopardy!), actor (The Paul Hogan Show), asthma attack.
- George Hekkers, 84, American football player.
- Neville Holt, 95, Australian Olympic shooter.
- John McWethy, 61, American news correspondent (ABC News), skiing accident.
- Kurt Nemetz, 81, Austrian Olympic cyclist.
- Ruth Stafford Peale, 101, American writer, widow of Norman Vincent Peale.
- Kalpana Rai, 57, Indian actress.
- Tony Rolt, 89, British racing driver and last living participant in the first F1 World Championship race.
- Gwenc'hlan Le Scouëzec, 78, French leader of the Druids of Brittany.

=== 7 ===
- Richard Altick, 92, American historian and author.
- Alberto Bustamante Belaunde, 57, Peruvian politician, Prime Minister (1999–2000), heart attack.
- Andrew Bertie, 78, British Grand Master of the Order of Malta.
- Bill Bowman, 76, American football player.
- Hoàng Minh Chính, 85, Vietnamese dissident, pancreatic cancer.
- Tamara Desni, 96, German-born British actress.
- Lakshmipati, 50, Indian actor.
- Helen Mayer, 75, Australian politician, MP (1983–1987).
- Benny Neyman, 56, Dutch singer, cancer.
- Daphne Robinson, 75, New Zealand cricketer.
- Guy Severin, 81, Russian academician and engineer.
- Kunal Singh, 30, Indian actor, suicide by hanging.
- Frank Wayman, 76, English footballer (Chester City), struck by motorcycle.
- Nicolaas Jan van Strien, 61, Dutch conservationist, cancer.
- Leona Wood, 86, American painter and dancer

=== 8 ===
- John Bartlett, 58, Australian politician.
- Chua Ek Kay, 61, Singaporean painter and Cultural Medallion winner, nose cancer.
- Eva Dahlbeck, 87, Swedish actress and writer, infection.
- Frank J. Dixon, 87, American University teacher.
- Victor Dominguez, 72, Filipino congressman, cardiac arrest.
- Earl B. Fowler Jr., 82, American Vice Admiral.
- J. Hemachandran, 75, Indian politician and trade unionist, spinal cord injury.
- Robert Jastrow, 82, American astronomer, physicist and cosmologist, pneumonia.
- Stephen Kipkorir, 37, Kenyan long-distance runner, car crash.
- Swaran Lata, 83, Pakistani film actress.
- Jane Lumb, 65, British model and actress, appeared in Fry's Turkish Delight commercials, breast cancer.
- Ah Meng, 48, Sumatran orangutan, tourist icon at Singapore Zoo.
- K. Rajaram, 82, Indian politician.
- Rudie Sypkes, 57, Australian founder of the Chickenfeed retail chain and philanthropist, pulmonary fibrosis.
- Phyllis A. Whitney, 104, American mystery novelist, pneumonia.

=== 9 ===
- Alfred Altenburger, 84, Swiss speed skater.
- Baba Amte, 93, Indian social activist, advocate for lepers, RLA recipient.
- John Anthony Derrington, 86, British civil engineer.
- Robert DoQui, 73, American character actor (RoboCop, Coffy, Nashville).
- Scot Halpin, 54, American one time drummer for The Who, brain tumor.
- Günter Havenstein, 79, German Olympic runner.
- Christopher Hyatt, 64, American psychologist, occultist, and author, cancer.
- Gene Knutson, 75, American football player.
- Dorothy Podber, 75, American performance artist, shot Andy Warhol's Shot Marilyns paintings.
- Merril Sandoval, 82, American Navajo Code Talker during World War II.
- Joseph Tyree Sneed III, 87, American senior judge (Court of Appeals for the Ninth Circuit).
- Carm Lino Spiteri, 75, Maltese architect and politician.
- Jazeh Tabatabai, 77, Iranian avant-garde painter, poet, and sculptor, heart failure.
- Harry Tapping, 81, New Zealand cricketer.
- Guy Tchingoma, 22, Gabonese footballer, on-field collision.
- Mindrolling Trichen, 78, Tibetan ceremonial head of the Nyingma school of Tibetan Buddhism.
- Georgy Yegorov, 89, Russian Soviet Navy Admiral of the Fleet.

=== 10 ===
- John Abbotts, 83, English footballer.
- Arne Barhaugen, 76, Norwegian Olympic Nordic combined skier.
- Freddie Bell, 76, American rhythm and blues singer, cancer.
- Kirk Browning, 86, American television director, heart attack.
- Alaa Abdulkareem Fartusi, 29, Iraqi journalist and cameraman, victim of the Balad bomb blast.
- Ārijs Geikins, 71, Latvian playwright, writer, director, actor and drama teacher.
- Adeline Geo-Karis, 89, American politician, member of Illinois State Senate (1979–2007), natural causes.
- Steve Gerber, 60, American comic book writer (Howard the Duck, Captain America, Daredevil), idiopathic pulmonary fibrosis.
- Ove Jørstad, 37, Norwegian footballer, cardiac arrest.
- Ron Leavitt, 60, American television writer and producer (Married... with Children, Unhappily Ever After, The Jeffersons), lung cancer.
- Dario Lodigiani, 91, American baseball player.
- William Long, 85, British politician, MP of Northern Ireland (1962–1972).
- Peter Marginter, 73, Austrian author.
- Inga Nielsen, 61, Danish soprano, cancer.
- Manuel Ortiz, 59, Cuban Olympic fencer.
- Roy Scheider, 75, American actor (Jaws, The French Connection, All That Jazz), staph infection.
- Ramón Daumal Serra, 95, Spanish Roman Catholic bishop.
- Chris Townson, 60, British drummer (John's Children).
- Ray Wu, 79, American biologist and educator.

=== 11 ===
- Fouad al-Tikerly, 81, Iraqi novelist and judge, pancreatic cancer.
- Emilio Carballido, 82, Mexican playwright, heart attack.
- Tom Lantos, 80, American Representative from California since 1981, only Holocaust survivor elected to Congress, esophageal cancer.
- Torakichi Nakamura, 92, Japanese professional golfer, natural causes.
- Frank Piasecki, 88, American aeronautical engineer who invented the tandem rotor placement in helicopter design, stroke.
- Rahatullah, 18, Pakistani cricketer (Peshawar, Under-19 national team), shot.
- Alfredo Reinado, 39, East Timorese rebel, shot during attack on José Ramos-Horta.
- Zelig Sharfstein, 79, American chief rabbi of Cincinnati, heart condition.
- Melvin Alvah Traylor Jr., 92, American ornithologist and curator emeritus at the Field Museum of Natural History.
- Carolina Tronconi, 94, Italian gymnast, Olympic silver medalist (1928).
- Laura Urdapilleta, 76, Mexican ballerina.

=== 12 ===
- T. O. S. Benson, 90, Nigerian lawyer.
- Oscar Brodney, 100, American lawyer and screenwriter (Harvey).
- John Brunious, 67, American jazz trumpeter, heart attack.
- Ron Chippindale, 75, New Zealand chief air accident investigator, car accident.
- Boris Chirikov, 79, Soviet and Russian physicist, cancer.
- Wilson Hermosa González, 64, Bolivian musician and composer (Los Kjarkas).
- David Groh, 68, American actor (Rhoda, General Hospital, Love Is a Many Splendored Thing), kidney cancer and heart failure.
- Thomas Grosser, 42, German footballer, heart attack during training.
- Preston Hanson, 87, American actor (Julius Caesar, The Loretta Young Show, Cage of Evil).
- Geoffrey Lewis, 87, British Professor of Turkish at Oxford University.
- Monica Morell, 54, Swiss singer, cancer.
- Imad Mughniyah, 45, Lebanese senior member of Hezbollah, car bomb.
- Badri Patarkatsishvili, 52, Georgian business oligarch and 2008 presidential candidate, heart attack.
- Jean Prouff, 88, French footballer and manager.

=== 13 ===
- Smoky Dawson, 94, Australian country music performer, after a short illness.
- Michele Greco, 83, Italian Mafia boss, lung cancer.
- Kon Ichikawa, 92, Japanese film director (Tokyo Olympiad, The Burmese Harp), pneumonia.
- Larry King, 15, Student at E.O. Green Junior High School, shot.
- Rajendra Nath, 75, Indian film actor, cardiac arrest.
- Henri Salvador, 90, French jazz singer and guitarist, aneurysm.
- Lionel Mark Smith, 62, American actor (Days of Our Lives, Homicide, Magnolia), cancer.
- Roger Voisin, 89, American trumpeter.

=== 14 ===
- Gene Allen, 79, American jazz reedist.
- Len Boyd, 84, British footballer.
- Jess Cain, 81, American radio personality (WHDH AM), cancer.
- Thurlow Cooper, 74, American football player (New York Titans).
- Hal Erickson, 88, American baseball player.
- Chuck Heaton, 90, American sports journalist.
- Sir Ralph Howell, 84, British Conservative MP (1970–1997).
- Steven Kazmierczak, 27, American mass murderer (Northern Illinois University shooting), suicide by gunshot.
- Sir Desmond Langley, 77, British army general.
- Odell Lawson, 59, American football running back.
- Perry Lopez, 78, American actor (Chinatown, Kelly's Heroes, McLintock!), lung cancer.
- William Modell, 86, American chairman of Modell's Sporting Goods, complications from prostate cancer.
- Padoh Mahn Sha Lah Phan, 64, Burmese Secretary General of Karen National Union, shot.

=== 15 ===
- Willie P. Bennett, 56, Canadian singer, natural causes.
- Sam Bith, 74, Cambodian former Khmer Rouge commander.
- Ashley Callie, 31, South African actress, car accident.
- Joaquim Costa, 72, Portuguese rock musician.
- Werner Giesa, 53, German author.
- Antoni Heda, 91, Polish Brigadier General, freedom fighter during World War II.
- Marcel Hendrickx, 82, Belgian cyclist.
- Derek Lawden, 88, British-born New Zealand mathematician.
- Amnon Netzer, 73, Iranian Jewish historian.
- Peter B. Neubauer, 94, American child psychiatrist.
- Marijan Oblak, 88, Croatian Archbishop of Zadar.
- Naziha Salim, 81, Iraqi painter, complications from a stroke.
- Walter Warwick Sawyer, 96, English mathematician.
- Mikhail Solomentsev, 94, Russian Chairman of the Council of Ministers of the SFSR (1971–1983).
- Inge Thun, 62, Norwegian footballer (Strømsgodset), stroke.
- Johnny Weaver, 72, American professional wrestler, natural causes.

=== 16 ===
- Radway Allen, 97, New Zealand fisheries biologist.
- Shelley Beattie, 40, American bodybuilder (American Gladiators), suicide by hanging.
- Hugh Bullard, 65, Bahamian Olympic sprinter.
- Harry Flemming, 74, Canadian journalist, complications from cancer and pneumonia.
- Brendan Hughes, 59, Irish member of the Provisional IRA.
- Jerry Karl, 66, American racing driver, car accident.
- Boris Khmelnitsky, 67, Russian actor in adventure films.
- Hans Leussink, 96, German politician.
- Shawn Lonsdale, 38, American videographer and critic of Scientology.
- Bobby Lord, 74, American country musician.
- Vittorio Lucarelli, 79, Italian Olympic fencer.
- Horst-Rüdiger Magnor, 65, German Olympic athlete.
- Per Erik Monsen, 61, Norwegian Member of Parliament (1997–2005), complications from heart attack.
- James Orange, 65, American civil rights activist.
- Fabio Presca, 77, Italian Olympic basketball player.
- Charlie Ryan, 92, American musician and songwriter ("Hot Rod Lincoln"), heart disease.

=== 17 ===
- Nicola Agnozzi, 96, Italian Roman Catholic prelate.
- Aysel Gürel, 80, Turkish lyric writer and actress, chronic bronchitis.
- Brian Harris, 72, English footballer (Everton, Cardiff City, Newport County).
- Bill Juzda, 87, Canadian ice hockey defenceman (Toronto Maple Leafs, New York Rangers), cancer.
- Manna, 43, Bangladeshi film actor, heart attack.
- Val Ross, 57, Canadian journalist and children's writer, brain cancer.
- Benigno G. Tabora, 92, American survivor of Bataan Death March.
- Winning Colors, 23, American racehorse, won 1988 Kentucky Derby, euthanized.

=== 18 ===
- Grits Gresham, 85, American conservationist, sportsman and actor, complication of infection and pneumonia.
- Jim Jones, 57, American rock guitarist (Pere Ubu), heart attack.
- Raymond Kennedy, 73, American novelist, complications of a stroke.
- Sir Richard Knowles, 90, British leader of Birmingham City Council (1984–1993), bladder cancer.
- Jack Lyons, 92, British financier and philanthropist.
- Mihaela Mitrache, 52, Romanian actress, cancer.
- Ralph Brazelton Peck, 95, American civil engineer.
- Alain Robbe-Grillet, 85, French writer (Last Year at Marienbad), heart failure.
- Raymond J. Smith, 77, American editor, complications of pneumonia.
- Stanisław Swatowski, 73, Polish Olympic sprinter.
- Alec N. Wildenstein, 67, French international art dealer, ex-husband of socialite Jocelyn Wildenstein, cancer.

=== 19 ===
- Barry Barclay, 63, New Zealand film maker, heart attack.
- Mary Barclay, 91, British actress.
- Jean-Michel Bertrand, 64, French politician.
- Natalia Bessmertnova, 66, Russian prima ballerina, cancer.
- Richard D'Aeth, 95, British scholar.
- Eugene Freedman, 82, American figurine creator.
- David Hildyard, 91, English sound engineer (Fiddler on the Roof, Cabaret, Firestarter), Oscar winner (1972, 1973).
- Bob Howsam, 89, American sports executive (Denver Broncos, Cincinnati Reds), heart condition.
- Yegor Letov, 43, Russian punk rock singer, heart failure.
- Teo Macero, 82, American record producer and saxophonist.
- Emily Perry, 100, British actress.
- Peter Pianto, 78, Australian footballer.
- Lydia Shum, 62, Hong Kong actress, liver cancer.
- David Watkin, 82, British cinematographer (Out of Africa, Chariots of Fire, Moonstruck), Oscar winner (1986), cancer.

=== 20 ===
- Peter S. Albin, 73, American economist.
- Mary Elizabeth Carnegie, 91, American nurse, cardiovascular disease.
- Larry Davis, 41, American convicted murderer, stabbed.
- D. G. S. Dhinakaran, 73, Indian evangelist.
- Prakash Vishvanath Paranjape, 60, Indian Shiv Sena politician, cancer.
- Helmut Sturm, 75, German painter.
- Bobby Lee Trammell, 74, American rockabilly singer, Arkansas Representative (1997–2002).

=== 21 ===
- Madalena Barbosa, 65, Portuguese feminist.
- Paul-Louis Carrière, 99, French Roman Catholic prelate.
- Ben Chapman, 79, American actor (Creature from the Black Lagoon).
- Joe Gibbs, 65, Jamaican reggae producer, heart attack.
- Ana González Olea, 92, Chilean actress, septic shock.
- Archie Hind, 79, British novelist.
- Hans Janitschek, 73, Austrian journalist, heart attack.
- Geoff Leek, 76, Australian footballer with Essendon.
- Sunny Lowry, 97, One of the first English women to swim the English Channel.
- Evan Mecham, 83, American Governor of Arizona (1987–1988).
- Robin Moore, 82, American author (The French Connection, The Green Berets).
- Billy J. Murphy, 87, American football coach (University of Memphis).
- Emmanuel Sanon, 56, Haitian footballer, pancreatic cancer.
- Walter Eric Spear, 87, German physicist.
- Sufi Abu Taleb, 83, Egyptian politician, acting President (1981), Speaker of the People's Assembly (1978–1983).
- Sanggyai Yexe, 92, Chinese government official, one of the first ethnic Tibetans to join Mao Zedong's army and the Chinese Communist Party.

=== 22 ===
- Chuck Adamson, 71, American police officer and actor (Quiz Show, A River Runs Through It, The Stand), cancer.
- Richard Baer, 79, American television writer (Bewitched, Hennesey, That Girl), heart attack.
- Johnnie Carr, 97, American civil rights leader.
- Eagle Day, 75, American football player, after short illness.
- Rubens de Falco, 76, Brazilian telenovela actor (Escrava Isaura), heart failure.
- Nunzio Gallo, 79, Italian singer, represented Italy in the 1957 Eurovision Song Contest, brain haemorrhage.
- Maurice Laing, 90, English builder.
- Dennis Letts, 73, American actor (August: Osage County, Cast Away, Fire Down Below), lung cancer.
- Oswaldo Louzada, 95, Brazilian actor, multiple organ dysfunction syndrome.
- Stephen Marlowe, 79, American novelist (The Second Longest Night).
- Andreas Rüedi, 76, Swiss Olympic skier.
- Steve Whitaker, 53, British comic book colorist (V for Vendetta).

=== 23 ===
- Joaquim Pinto de Andrade, 81, Angolan politician, first honorary MPLA President, PRD chairman, after long illness.
- Henry Arana, 86, Puerto Rican composer.
- Janez Drnovšek, 57, Slovenian Prime Minister (1992–2002) and President (2002–2007), cancer.
- Josep Palau i Fabre, 90, Spanish author.
- Roger Foulon, 84, Belgian writer.
- Douglas Fraser, 91, American president of the United Auto Workers, emphysema.
- Paul Frère, 91, Belgian Formula One driver, 24 Hours of Le Mans winner and automobile journalist.
- Denis Lazure, 82, Canadian politician (NDP), cancer.
- Hubert Lilliefors, 79, American statistician, lung cancer.
- Gentil Ferreira Viana, 72, Angolan politician.

=== 24 ===
- Phil Bodner, 90, American jazz clarinetist and studio musician.
- Peter Curtin, 58, Australian cricketer.
- Lady Darcy de Knayth, 69, British crossbench member of the House of Lords, disability campaigner.
- Alan Dargin, 40, Australian didgeridoo player.
- Floyd Matthews, 105, American oldest living submariner.
- Larry Norman, 60, American Christian rock singer/songwriter, heart failure.
- Shirley Ritts, 87, American interior designer, mother of photographer Herb Ritts, emphysema.
- W. Laird Stabler Jr., 77, American former Attorney General of Delaware, oral cancer.
- Pearl Witherington, 93, British World War II Secret Service agent.
- Milford Zornes, 100, American watercolor artist, heart failure.

=== 25 ===
- Ashley Cooper, 27, Australian V8 Supercar driver, injuries from a race crash.
- Genoa Keawe, 89, American performer of Hawaiian music.
- Hans Raj Khanna, 95, Indian Supreme Court judge.
- Alan Ledesma, 30, Mexican telenovela actor, stomach cancer.
- Static Major, 33, American performer, record producer and songwriter, from complications after medical procedure.
- Vladimir Troshin, 81, Russian singer and actor.
- Roy Wise, 84, American baseball player.

=== 26 ===
- Julio García Agapito, 44, Peruvian environmentalist, shot.
- Charles Chan, 93, Chinese actor and director.
- Jimmy Dugdale, 76, English footballer (West Bromwich Albion, Aston Villa).
- Paddy Fahey, 84, Irish Olympic athlete.
- Tyronne Fernando, 66, Sri Lankan politician, Foreign Minister (2001–2004).
- Cabral Ferreira, 56, Portuguese President of C.F. Os Belenenses (2005–2008), cancer.
- Dick Fletcher, 65, American meteorologist at WTSP Tampa Bay, stroke.
- Robert Kraichnan, 80, American physicist, heart disease.
- Buddy Miles, 60, American drummer (Band of Gypsys, Electric Flag), lead vocalist (California Raisins), heart failure.
- Dan Shomron, 70, Israeli general, Chief of the Defense Forces (1987–1991), stroke.
- Bodil Udsen, 83, Danish actress, after short illness.
- Zbigniew Woźnicki, 49, Polish Olympic cyclist.
- John Yates, 82, British Anglican prelate, Bishop of Gloucester (1975–1992).

=== 27 ===
- Shihab al-Tamimi, 74, Iraqi head of the Journalists Syndicate, heart attack following a gunshot wound.
- Mira Alečković, 84, Serbian and Yugoslav poet.
- Anna Andreeva, 90, Russian textile designer.
- Anthony Blond, 79, British book publisher.
- William F. Buckley Jr., 82, American author, conservative political commentator, founder of National Review magazine, emphysema.
- Boyd Coddington, 63, American owner of hot rod shop, star of American Hot Rod on TLC.
- Octavio Cortázar, 73, Cuban film director and screenwriter, heart attack.
- Myron Cope, 79, American radio broadcaster for the Pittsburgh Steelers, inventor of the "Terrible Towel".
- David Edwards, 20, American football player paralyzed during a game in 2003, pneumonia.
- W. C. Heinz, 93, American sportswriter.
- Ernst Hiller, 79, German motorcycle racer.
- Raymond Kāne, 82, American slack key guitarist.
- Mandi Lampi, 19, Finnish child actress and singer.
- Ivan Rebroff, 76, German singer.
- Barbara Seaman, 72, American writer, journalist and activist, lung cancer.
- Sujatha, 72, Indian author, inventor of the electronic voting machine, multiple organ failure.

=== 28 ===
- Aharon Amir, 85, Israeli author and translator, natural causes.
- John Bliss, 77, American actor (Ned's Declassified School Survival Guide, Intolerable Cruelty, Andy Richter Controls the Universe), aortic aneurysm.
- Gérard Calvet, 80, French abbot and founder of the Abbey of Le Barroux, heart attack.
- Milt Harradence, 86, Canadian lawyer, judge and former leader of PCAA, cancer.
- Joseph M. Juran, 103, American engineer and philanthropist, stroke.
- Miss Alleged, 20, French Thoroughbred racehorse, euthanized.
- Val Plumwood, 67, Australian ecologist and feminist, natural causes.
- Julian Rathbone, 73, British novelist.
- Mike Smith, 64, British rock and roll singer and keyboardist (The Dave Clark Five), pneumonia.
- André Verhalle, 84, Belgian Olympic fencer.

=== 29 ===
- Maria Adelaide Aboim Inglez, 75, Portuguese communist activist.
- Bill Carlson, 73, American news anchor (WCCO, Twin Cities), prostate cancer.
- Buddy Dial, 71, American football player.
- Vitaly Fedorchuk, 89, Russian head of the KGB.
- Jerry Groom, 78, American football player.
- Ralph Hansch, 83, Canadian Olympic ice hockey player.
- Janet Kagan, 61, American writer, chronic obstructive pulmonary disease.
- Erik Ortvad, 90, Danish artist.
- Gayne Rescher, 83, American cinematographer (Star Trek II: The Wrath of Khan, Rachel, Rachel, The Day After).
