= Samuel Boyle =

Samuel Boyle may refer to:

- Samuel Boyle (journalist) (1948–2008), American journalist
- Sam Boyle (1876–1923), American football player and coach
