= Urdapilleta =

Urdapilleta is a surname. Notable people with the surname include:

- Alejandro Urdapilleta (1954–2013), Uruguayan actor
- Benjamín Urdapilleta (born 1986), Argentine rugby union footballer
- Fernando Urdapilleta (1924–2013), Argentine equestrian
- Laura Urdapilleta (1932–2008), primaballerina of the national Mexican dance company
