= Anna Andreeva =

Anna Andreeva may refer to:

- Anna Andreyeva (1915–1997), Soviet shot put athlete
- Anna Andreeva (artist) (1917–2009), Russian textile designer
