= Floyd Matthews =

- Born: Floyd Huston Matthews; February 3, 1903; Westpoint, Tennessee
- Died: February 24, 2008; Eliza Coffee Memorial Hospital, Alabama
- Other names: Skipper Matthews
- Employer: U.S. Navy
- Known for: Being the oldest submariner veteran (aged 105 in 2008); Use of Momsen lung for submarine rescue (1939)

Floyd Huston "Skipper" Matthews (February 3, 1903 – February 24, 2008) was, at age 105, an American veteran of the United States Navy, in which he served for thirty years. Matthews was the oldest living United States military veteran in Alabama as well as the oldest living submariner at the time of his death at the age of 105. He was also one of the oldest surviving World War II veterans and one of the few surviving World War I era veterans, according to the Alabama Department of Veterans Affairs.

Matthews was one of the first people to use the Momsen Lung rebreathing system, and used it to rescue 33 colleagues from a sunken submarine in 1939.

== Early life ==
Matthews was born in 1903 in Westpoint, Tennessee, later living in Loretto, Tennessee. When he was 16, he ran away from home to join the navy.

== Career ==
Matthews first enlisted in the United States Navy in 1919 in the months following the end of World War I, when Matthews was aged 16 but pretending to be 19.

He received two months of training at the U.S. Naval Training Center in Gulfport, Mississippi before being assigned to a USS Pueblo and later to a USS Kansas. Altogether he served on 7 different submarines before World War II.

Between the wars, he was involved in testing the Momsen Lung, a rubber bag that used soda lime to recycle exhaled air that was used to rescue trapped submariners, both in swimming pool trials in New London, Connecticut and in Key West, Florida, where it was tested at a depth of 100 feet. In 1939, he used the device to rescue 33 colleagues from the USS Squalus, a sunken submarine.

After WWI, Matthews served a tour as a military recruiter in Knoxville, and as a submarine escape instructor.

During WWII, Matthews served as an executive officer aboard a salvage vessel during Normandy Landings before serving in the Pacific. By that time, he had risen through the ranks of the Navy to the level of lieutenant commander, commending the ocean tug USS Chickasaw before retiring in 1949.

He portrayed himself in the documentary Hanging by a thread, which was aired on BBC show Voyages of Discovery on April 11, 2021, 7 days after the death of his son Floyd in Loretto, Tennessee.

== Personal life ==
Matthews was a resident of Florence, Alabama. He was married to Vena Yocom Matthews. He had three sons, Floyd, William, and John and two daughters, Sondra and Priscilla.

== Death ==
Floyd Matthews died at Eliza Coffee Memorial Hospital. He was survived by his sons, Bill and John.
