= Le Barroux Abbey =

Benedictine monastery in Vaucluse, France

- Abbaye Sainte-Madeleine du Barroux
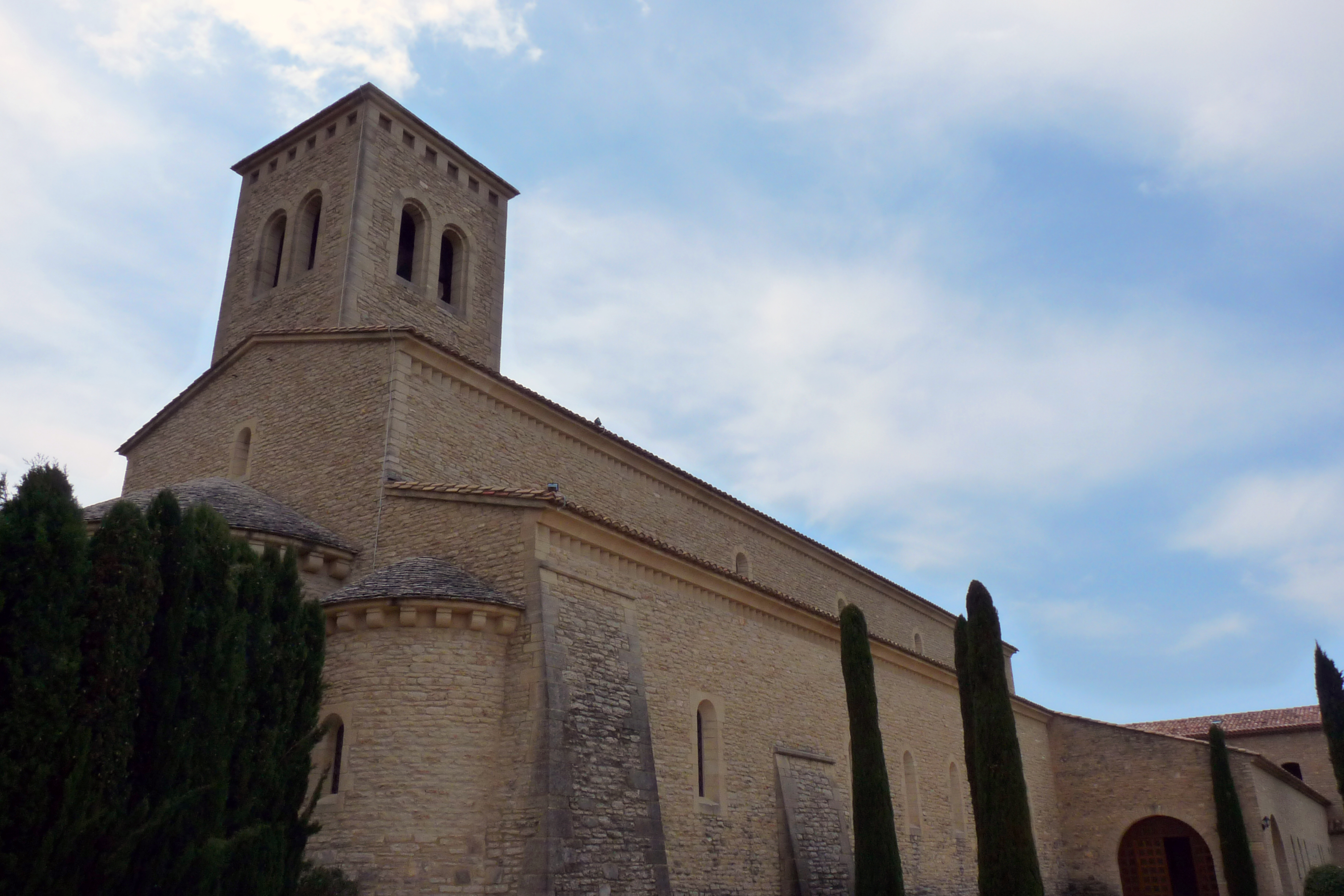

- Location within France
- Interactive map of Le Barroux Abbey

Monastery information
- Order: Benedictines
- Established: 1980 (de facto), 1989 (canonical status accorded)

People
- Abbot: Dom Louis-Marie de Geyer d'Orth

Architecture
- Groundbreaking: 1980

Site
- Location: Le Barroux, Vaucluse, France
- Coordinates: 44.1518°N 5.0979°E
- Website: https://www.barroux.org/#

The abbey of Sainte-Madeleine du Barroux also known as Le Barroux Abbey is a traditionalist Benedictine abbey located in Le Barroux, Vaucluse, France. It was founded in 1978 by Dom Gérard Calvet while the current abbot is Dom Louis-Marie de Geyer d’Orth.

The liturgy is celebrated according to the pre-1970 Roman Missal (Tridentine Mass). The Divine Office of the monastery is streamed daily.

== History ==
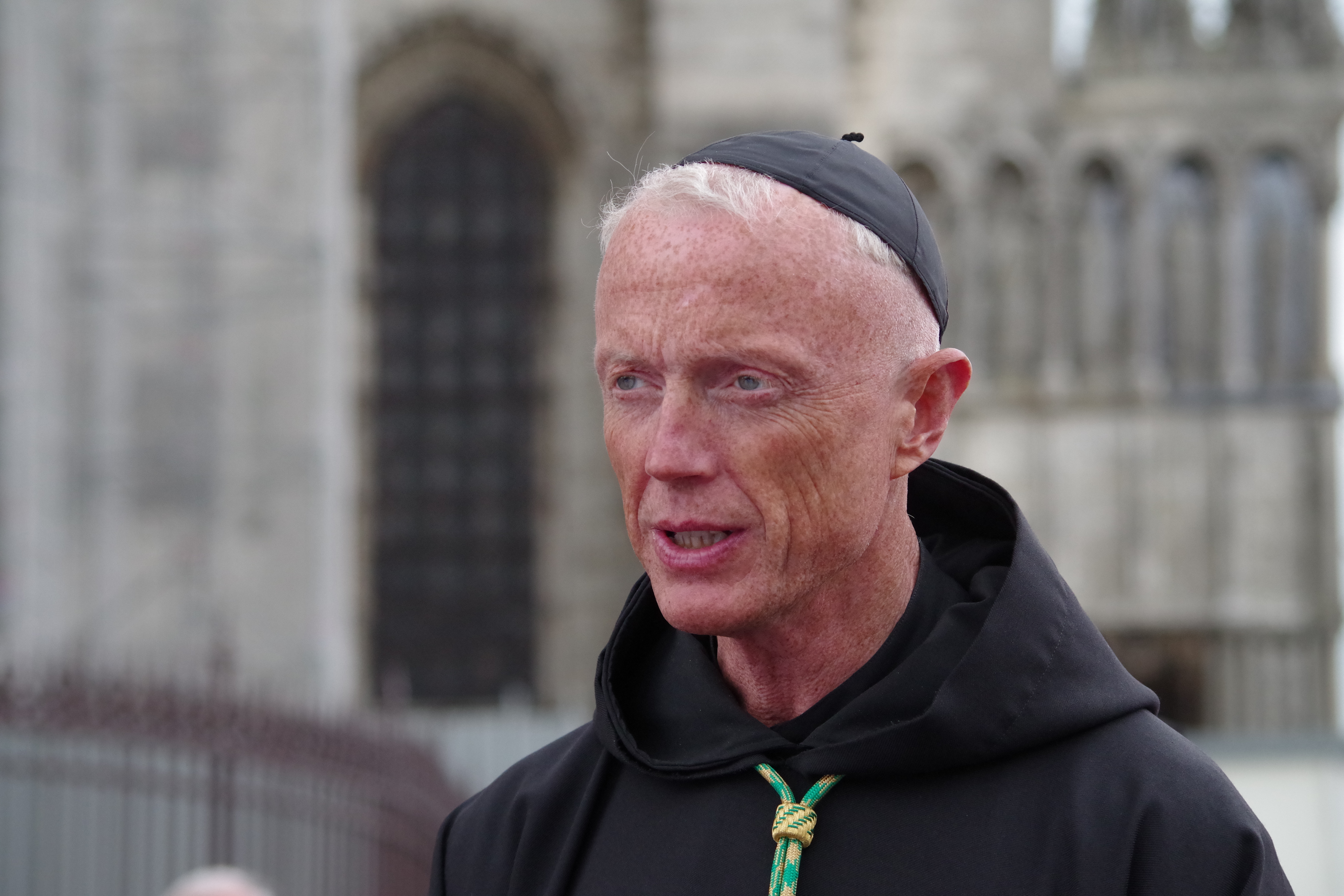
Current abbot Dom Louis-Marie de Geyer d'Orth, in 2016

Before the current abbey was consecrated, a group of men, led by Dom Gérard Calvet, founded a small community of Benedictine monks in the Chapel of St. Mary Magdalene in the Vaucluse region of south-east France. Shaken by the changes brought on by the Second Vatican Council, he founded the abbey as a way to continue the traditional practice and life of the Benedictine Monks and the traditional liturgy of the Catholic Church. In 1979 a female branch was founded, the Abbey of Notre-Dame-de-l'Annonciation. In 1986 the community numbered 53 monks.

Initially supportive of the Lefebvrist movement, they made a break with it in the aftermath of the Écône consecrations and the subsequent excommunications of Archbishop Marcel Lefebvre and the consecrated bishops. On July 25, 1988, after a period of negotiations the monks were relieved of their sanctions and reconciled with the Holy See, while still being authorized to use the pre-concillar liturgy in accordance with the motu proprio Ecclesia Dei issued by Pope John Paul II the day after the excommunications. On June 18, 1989, the monastery was accorded canonical status and on July 2 it was elevated to the rank of Abbey, with Dom Gerard Calvet as its first Abbot. The Abbey was consecrated on October 2, 1989, by Cardinal Édouard Gagnon.

On September 24, 1995, Cardinal Ratzinger, then prefect for the Congregation for the Doctrine of the Faith, visited the monastery and celebrated Mass. On November 21, 2002, eight of the almost 70 monks left the Abbey to found the Monastery of Sainte-Marie de la Garde in Saint-Pierre-de-Clairac. Dom Gerard resigned as Abbot on November 25, 2003, and Dom Louis-Marie was chosen to replace him. On February 28, 2008, Dom Gerard died due to brain stroke. On September 25, 2008, the Abbey became part of the Benedictine Confederation of the Order of St Benedict.

In 2008 several monks left Le Barroux and make an independent foundation in Villatalla, Imperia Province, Italy.

As of May 2014 the Abbey had 57 members, including 26 priests, 1 deacon, 21 brothers, 1 student, 1 temporarily professed and 5 novices, with 44 being the average age.

== Community ==
The monastery has its own mill, which is used to produce olive oil. The monks also produce lavender, wine and bread in their own bakery. The Abbey produces wine jointly with local winemakers in a traditional manner.

The monks offer spiritual retreats, as well as individual spiritual guidance. The Abbey has a hotel to accommodate the guests.

In order to enable oblates and other faithful to connect to the liturgical life of the monastery more closely, the monks began broadcasting their daily round of the Divine Office online. The recordings are available on the Abbey's website and via a phone app.

== Gallery ==
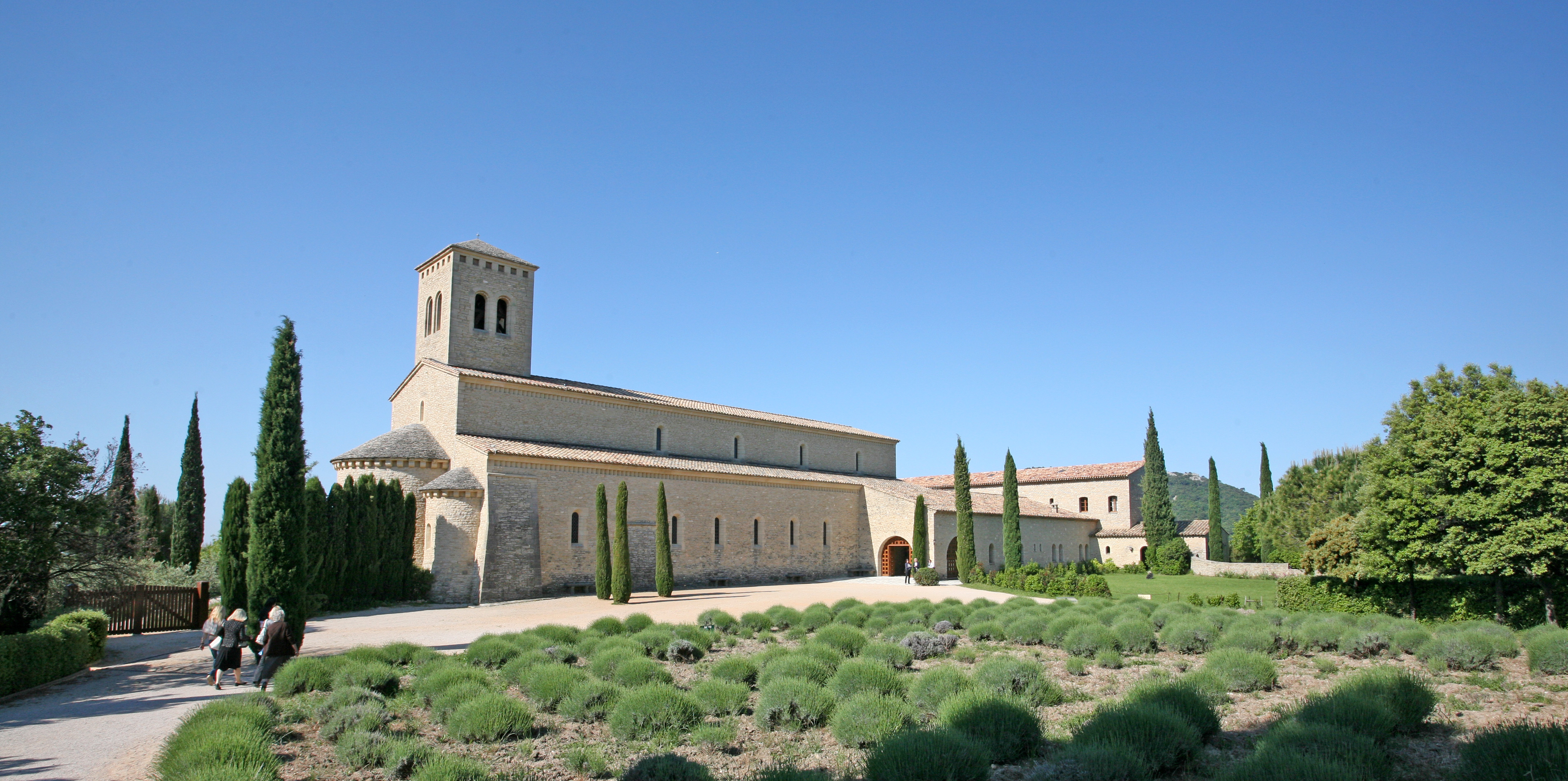
Another view of the Abbey

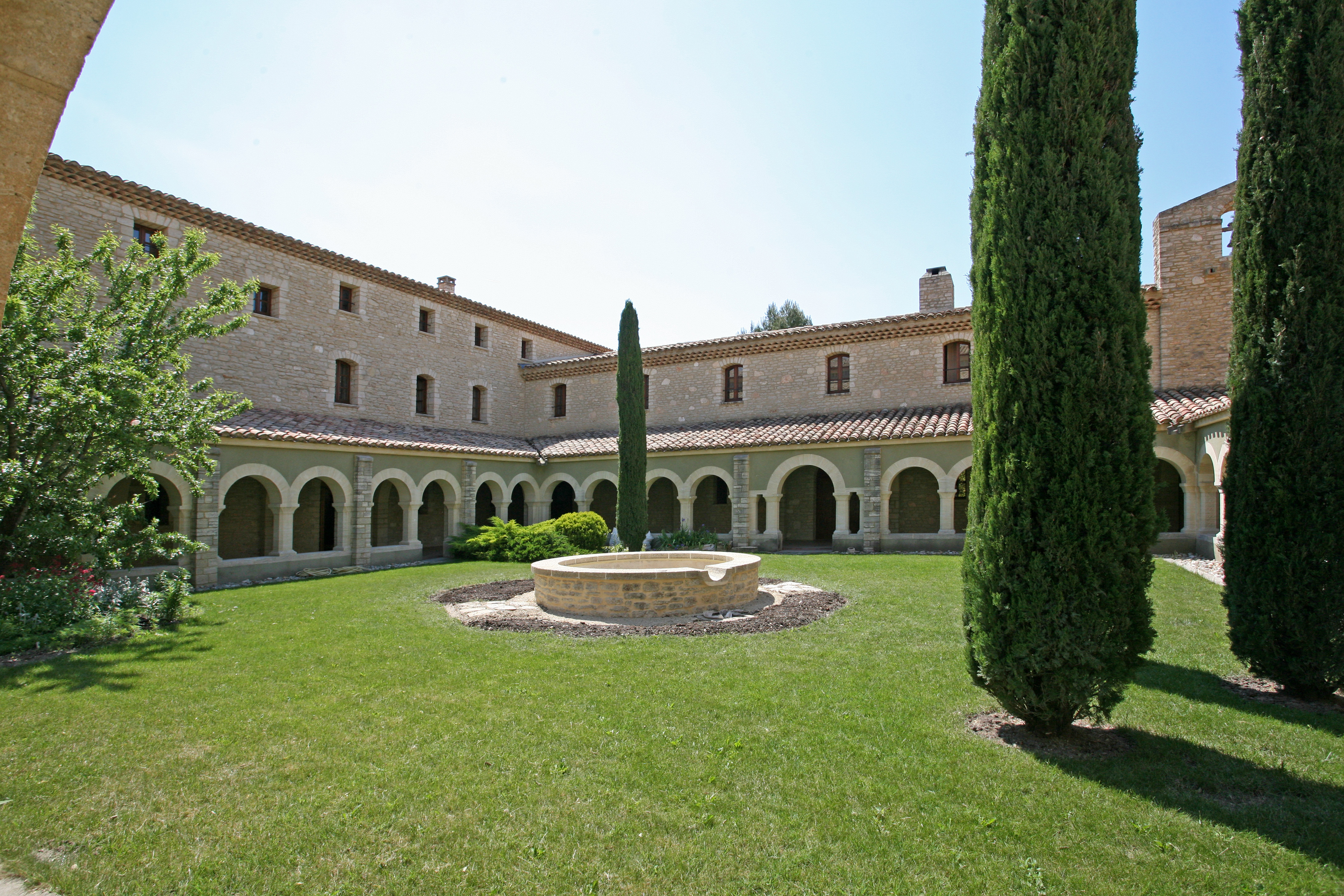
The cloister

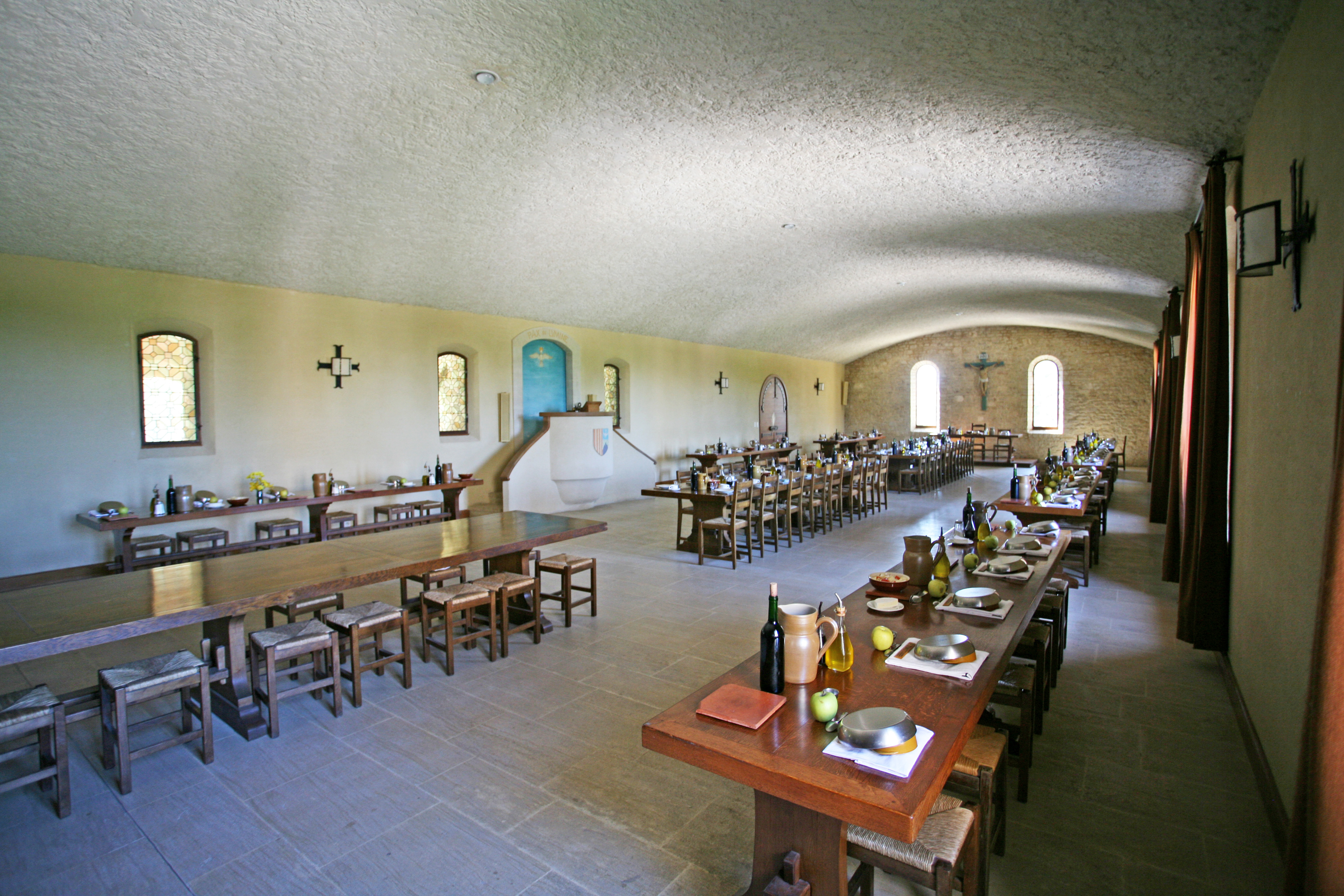
The refectory

== Resources ==
- Official site of the Abbey
- The Divine Office is streamed daily on iTunes and their official site
  - Previous recordings are archived at https://archive.org/details/barroux
- Documentary Watchmen of the Night about the daily life of the monks at Le Barroux Abbey (French with English subtitles)
