= Paul Curtin =

Australian cricketer (1954–2026)

Personal information
- Born: 10 May 1954; Adelaide, Australia
- Died: May 2026 (aged 71–72)
- Batting: Left-handed
- Bowling: Right-arm leg-spin
- Role: Bowler
- Relatives: Barry Curtin (brother); Peter Curtin (brother)

Domestic team information
- Years: Team
- 1974/75: South Australia
- 1980/81: Northern Districts

Career statistics
| Competition | First-class |
|---|---|
| Matches | 5 |
| Runs scored | 76 |
| Batting average | 12.66 |
| 100s/50s | 0/0 |
| Top score | 17 |
| Balls bowled | 648 |
| Wickets | 6 |
| Bowling average | 51.00 |
| 5 wickets in innings | 0 |
| 10 wickets in match | 0 |
| Best bowling | 2/36 |
| Catches/stumpings | 4/– |
- Source: Cricinfo, 18 September 2026

Paul Curtin (10 May 1954 – May 2026) was an Australian cricketer. He played five first-class matches for Northern Districts and South Australia between 1974 and 1981. His brothers, Barry and Peter, also played first-class cricket for South Australia.

Curtin was a leg-spin bowler with a sharp googly, who had a long career with Port Adelaide, taking 325 wickets. He died in May 2026.
