= 2008 Balad bombing =

Suicide car bombing in Iraq

- Location: Balad, Iraq
- Date: February 10, 2008; 1630 (1330 GMT) (UTC+3)
- Attack type: car bomb
- Deaths: 25-33 (reports vary)
- Injuries: 40+
- Perpetrator: Unknown

The 2008 Balad bombing occurred on February 10, 2008 when a car bomb detonated in a market in Balad, Iraq, at a strategic Iraqi Army checkpoint. It killed at least 25 and injuring 40 more, though some estimates place the death toll at 33. Some buildings have collapsed and several people have been reported missing, adding to the possible death toll.

Among the dead are a driver and Iraqi journalist Alaa Abdulkareem Fartusi, a cameraman for Al-Forat, a Shiite-backed satellite news station. Fartusi marks the first journalist killed in Iraq in 2008. A female reporter was injured in the blast and remains in critical condition.

The bombing was on the same day that U.S. Defense Secretary Robert Gates arrived in Baghdad unannounced to meet Iraqi government leaders and U.S. commanders, including General David Petraeus.

This is the second bomb attack on Balad. The first was on September 29, 2005 when 95 people were killed.
