= Wilson Hermosa González =

Musician and composer

Wilson Hermosa González (1 June 1943 – 12 February 2008) was a Bolivian musician and composer, born near Capinota, in the department of Cochabamba.

Along with his brothers Castel and Gonzalo, and Edgar Villarroel, on 23 June 1971 he founded the Los Kjarkas musical group, which subsequently enjoyed both national and international fame.

Wilson Hermosa's specialty were string instruments, in particular the charango.

He died on 12 February 2008 in Cochabamba following a stroke.
