= Le Barroux =

- Commune
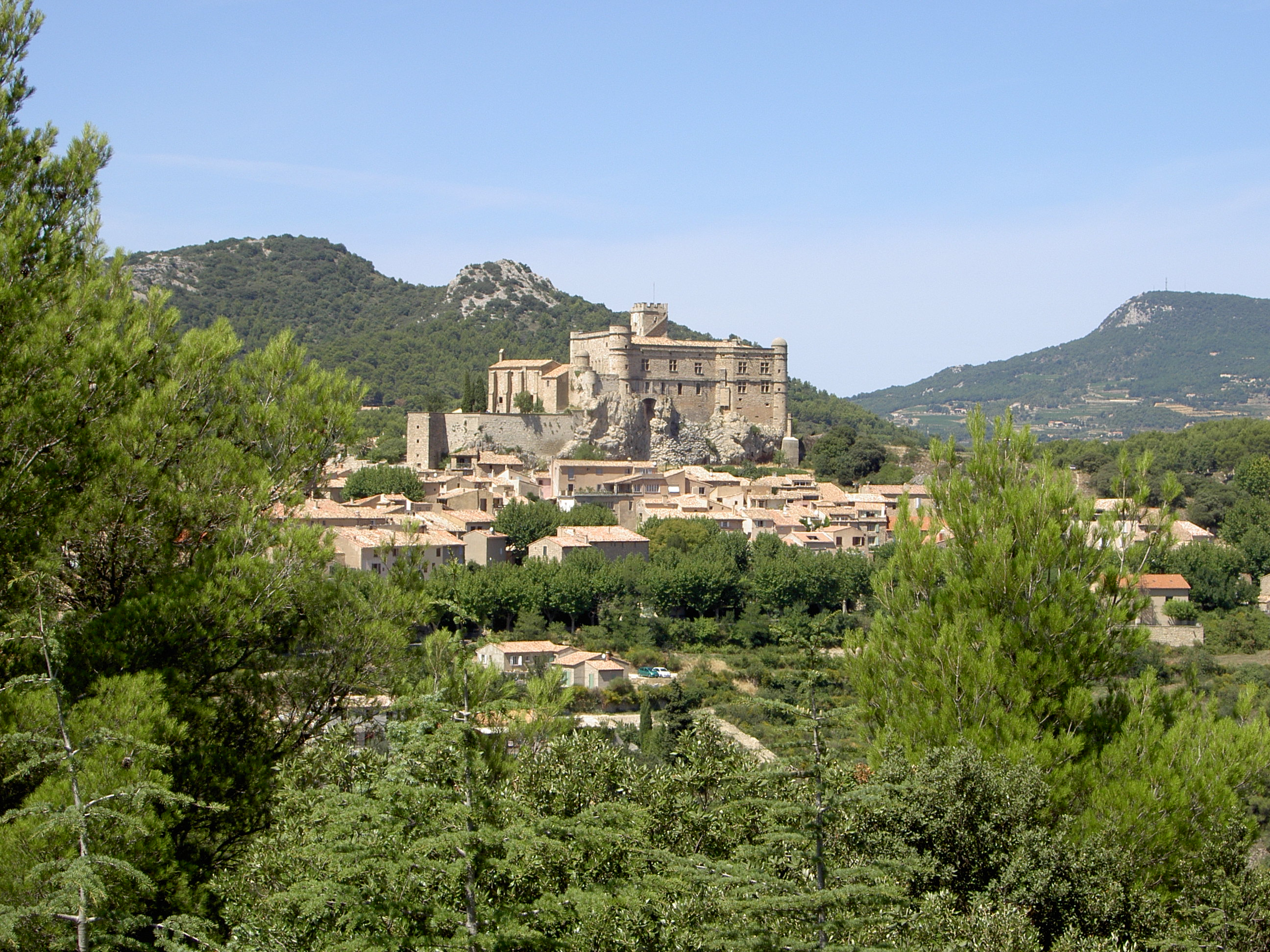
- Castle and village of Le Barroux

- Coat of arms
- Location of Le Barroux
- Location within France Location within Provence-Alpes-Côte d'Azur
- Coordinates: 44°08′16″N 5°06′01″E
- Country: France
- Region: Provence-Alpes-Côte d'Azur
- Department: Vaucluse
- Arrondissement: Carpentras
- Canton: Vaison-la-Romaine
- Intercommunality: CA Ventoux-Comtat Venaissin

Government
  - Mayor (2020–2026): Bernard Monnet
- Area^{1}: 16.04 km^{2} (6.19 sq mi)
- Elevation: 350 m (1,150 ft)
- Highest elevation: 670 m (2,200 ft)
- Lowest elevation: 218 m (715 ft)
- Population (2023): 662
  - Density: 41.3/km^{2} (107/sq mi)
- Time zone: UTC+01:00 (CET)
  - Summer (DST): UTC+02:00 (CEST)
- INSEE/Postal code: 84008 /84330
- ^{1} French Land Register data, which excludes lakes, ponds, glaciers > 1 km^{2} (0.386 sq mi or 247 acres) and river estuaries.

Le Barroux (French pronunciation: [lə baʁu]; Occitan: Lo Barós) is a village and commune in the Vaucluse department in the Provence-Alpes-Côte d'Azur region in southeastern France. As of 2023, the population of the commune was 662.

== History ==
Its current name derives from the Latin Albaruffum.

Its castle was built in the 12th century to oppose Saracen and Italian incursions, and went through major overhauls in the 16th and 17th centuries. The castle was damaged during the French Revolution, was repaired in 1929 using private funds, was set on fire by German occupation troops in 1944 as a reprisal for acts of resistance, and restored again after 1960. In its chapel are 18th-century wall paintings that are registered as historical monuments.

Its parish Church is dedicated to Saint John the Baptist.

Outside the village is the traditionalist Roman Catholic Benedictine Abbey named Sainte-Madeleine du Barroux, founded in 1978 by Dom Gérard Calvet (1927–2008).

Charles, Prince of Wales spent a week in the village in November 1990, convalescing after an operation.

Le Barroux is sister town with the English village of Much Marcle in Herefordshire.

== Economy ==
- Agriculture. Vineyards around the village produce Côtes du Ventoux AOC wine. Other productions are olive oil, cherries and apricots.
- Tourism. Visitors are attracted to the picturesque medieval village and castle and to the Benedictine abbey. Cyclists are attracted by the proximity of the Mont Ventoux, a mountain often featured in the Tour de France.
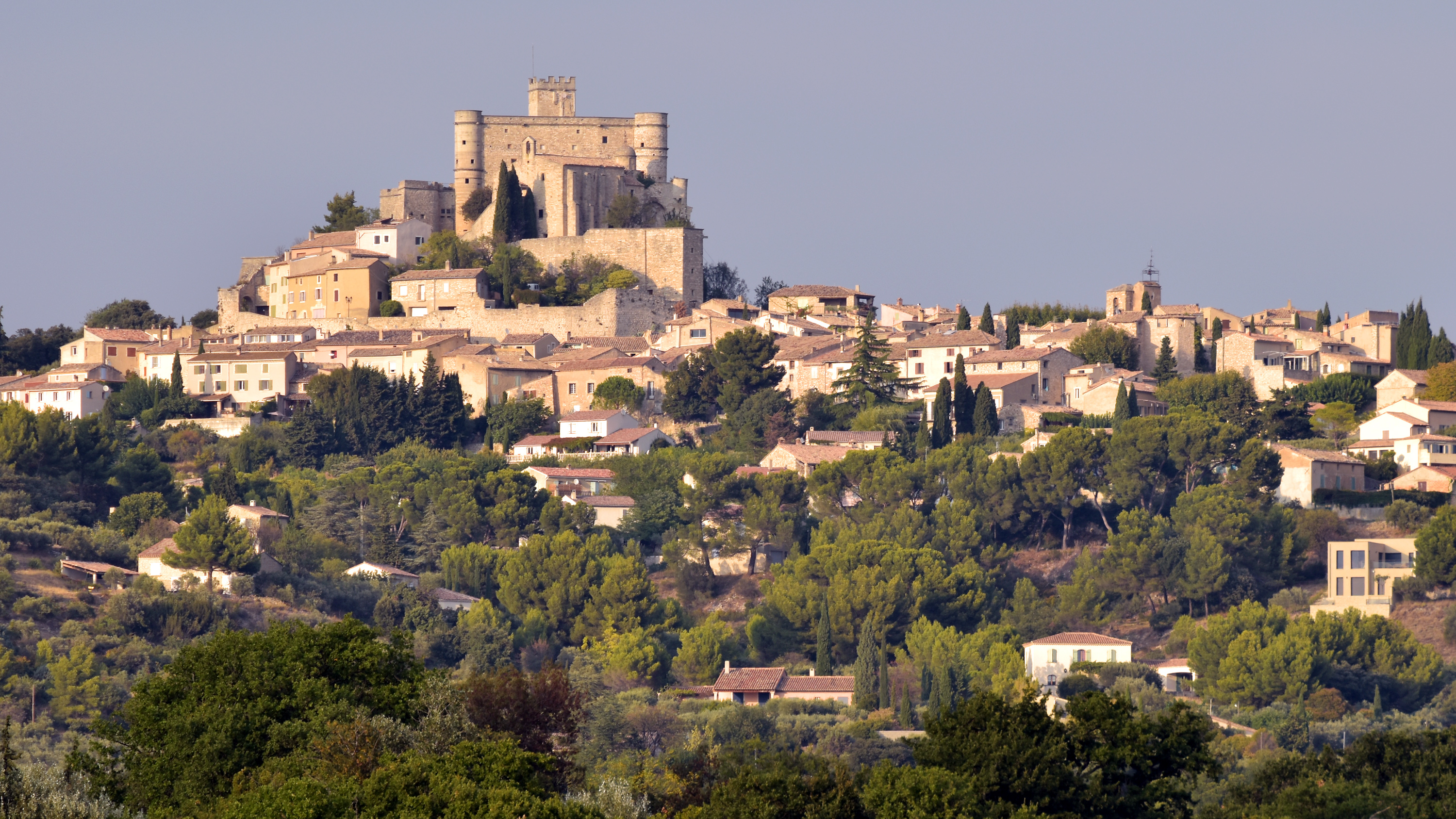
Le Barroux, south side

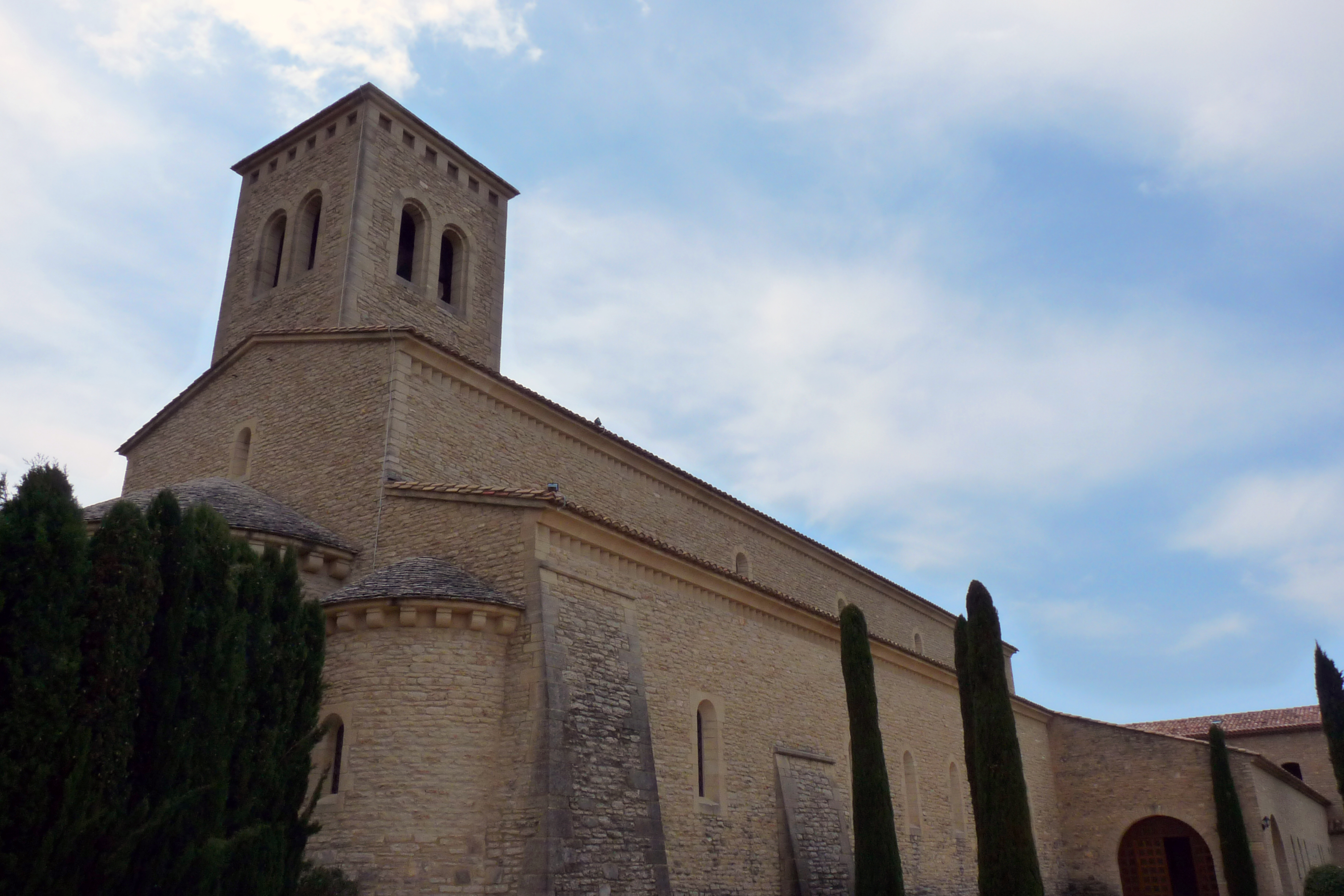
Benedictine abbey

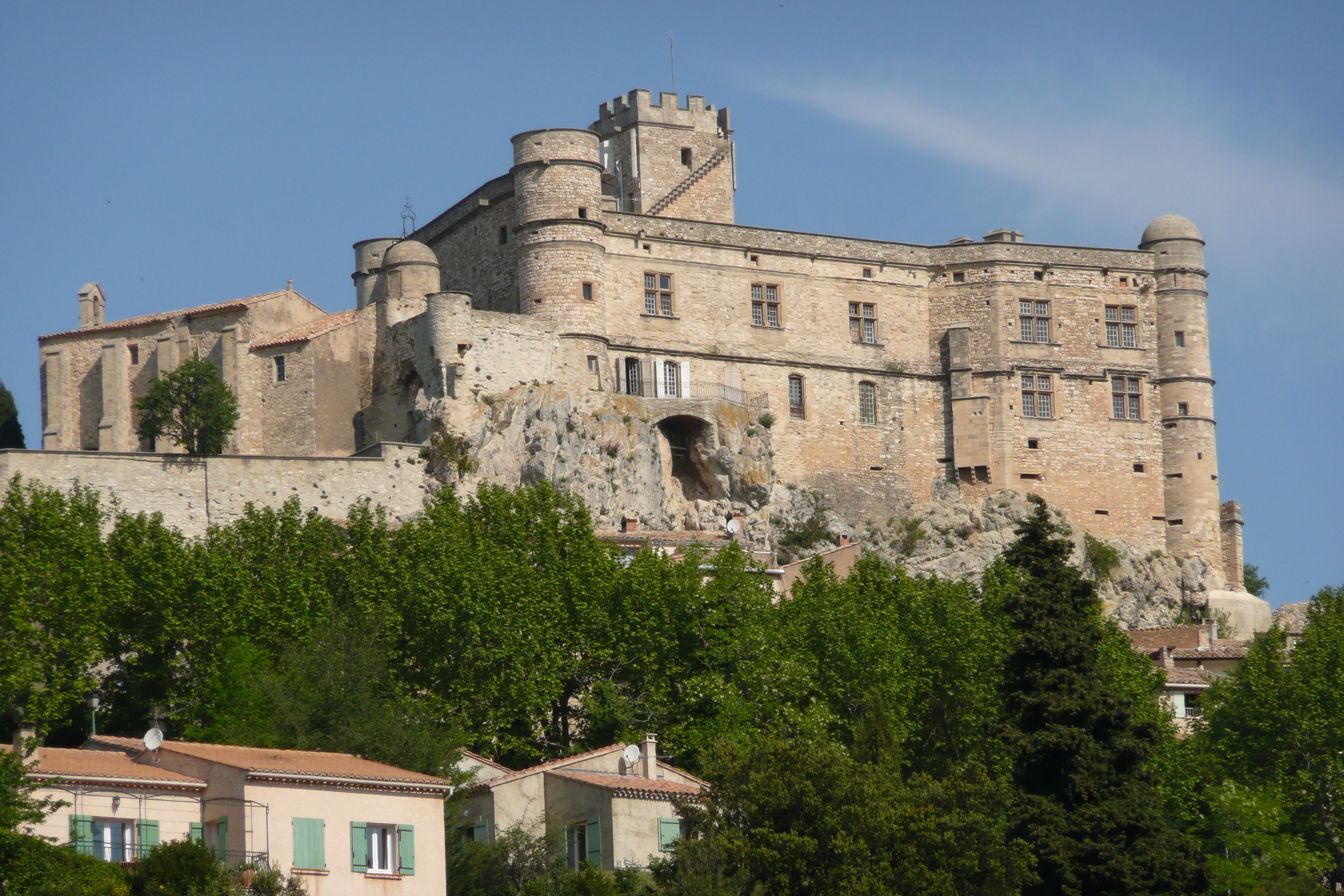
Castle

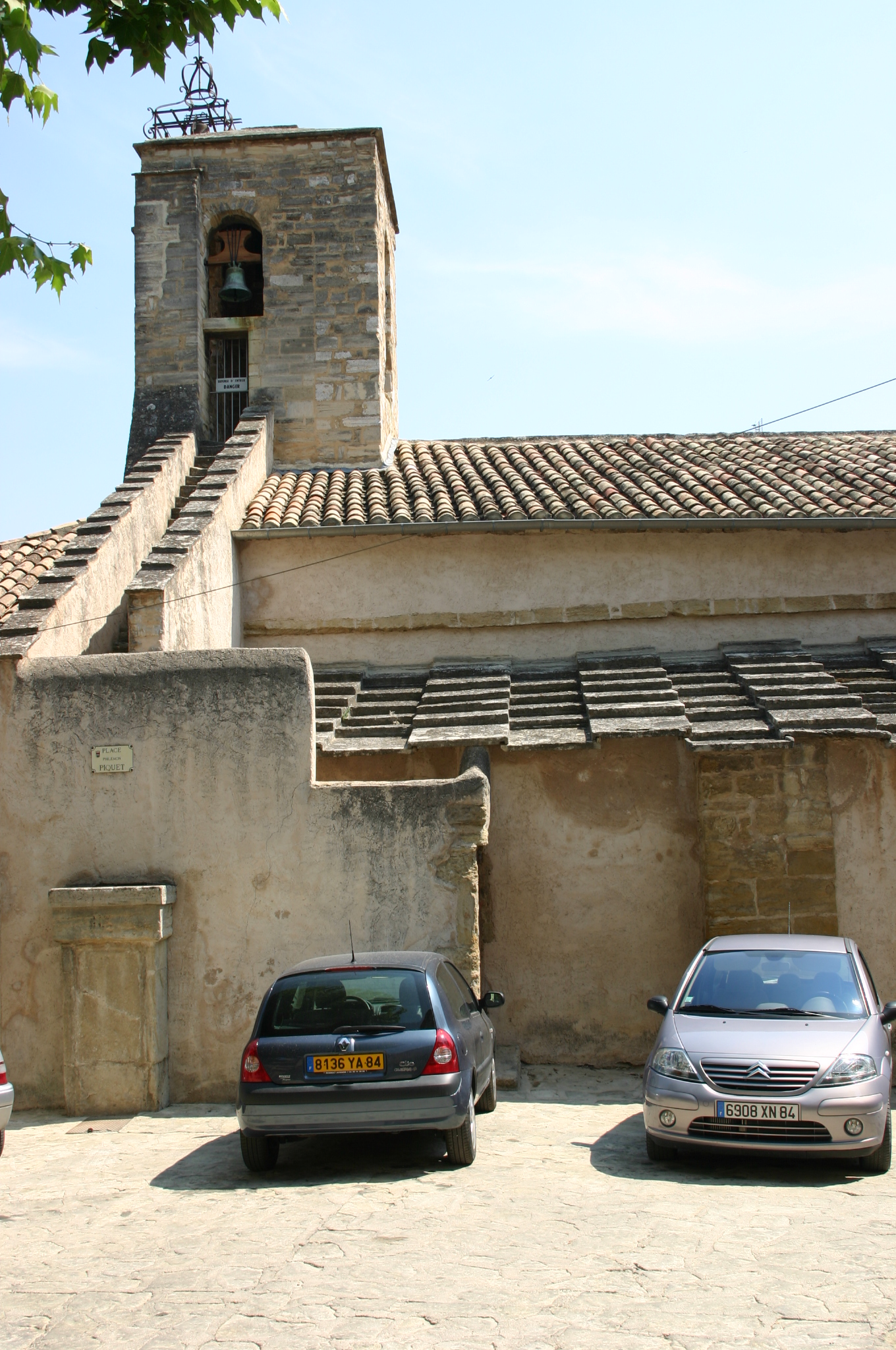
Parish Church

== See also ==
- Dentelles de Montmirail
- Communes of the Vaucluse department
