= Nicolaas Jan van Strien =

Dutch conservationist and zoologist

Nicolaas Jan van Strien (1 April 1946 – 7 February 2008), or just Nico van Strien, was a zoologist and conservationist of Dutch ancestry. He became notable for his conservation projects on the Sumatran rhinoceros and the Javan rhinoceros.

Nico van Strien was born in Etterbeek, Belgium, on 1 April 1946. He obtained a Master of Science degree at the Free University of Amsterdam in 1971. In 1985 he received a Ph.D. degree in agricultural science from Wageningen University.

Dr. van Strien was the South-East Asian programme officer for the International Rhino Foundation (IRF) and the co-chairman of the IUCN / SSC Asian Rhino Specialist Group from 1998 to 2008. He took part in Rhinoceros conservation projects in India, Sumatra and Java for 30 years. His field research on the Sumatran Rhinoceros in Gunung Leuser National Park was important for conservation measurements on this species. He further co-ordinated anti-poaching activities in the key Asian rhinoceros reserves, and was involved in captive breeding programs.

Nico van Strien was also a key member at the IUCN Tapir Specialist Group. He also provided critical technical advice to the UNDP-Global Environment Facility, the IUCN Asian Rhino Specialist Group, and the US Fish and Wildlife Service. His efforts were instrumental in helping people to work together for rhino conservation throughout Southeast Asia, including convening experts working on greater one-horned rhinos in India and Nepal. Nico van Strien was a long-term member of many other organizations, chairman of the Van Tienhoven Foundation for International Nature Protection, serving on the Board of the Netherlands Committee for International Nature Conservation and the Golden Ark Foundation (now Future for Nature), the Deutsche Gesellschaft für Säugetierkunde, and a life member of the Malawi Wildlife Society. Since 1980 Nico had also been collecting records towards a historical Mammal Atlas of South East Asia, which never was fully completed. Furthermore, he was co-founder of the Rhino Resource Center.

In spring 2007 cancer was diagnosed of which he died in his home in Doorn, Netherlands, on 7 February 2008.

== Key Sumatran rhino projects (selected) ==
- Sumatran Rhino Sanctuary
- RPU training program

== Selected works ==
- A guide to the tracks of the Mammals of western Indonesia, 1983
- Abbreviated checklist of the Mammals of the Australasian archipelago, 1986
- The Sumatran Rhinoceros in the Gunung Leuser National Park Its Distribution, Ecology and Conservation, 1986
- Foose, Thomas J. and van Strien, Nico (1997). Asian Rhinos – Status Survey and Conservation Action Plan. IUCN, Gland, Switzerland, and Cambridge, UK. ISBN 2-8317-0336-0.
