= Peter Curtin (cricketer) =

Australian cricketer

Personal information
- Born: 22 September 1949; Adelaide, Australia
- Died: 24 February 2008 (aged 58); Adelaide, South Australia
- Source: Cricinfo, 6 June 2018

Peter Curtin (22 September 1949 – 24 February 2008) was an Australian cricketer. He played one first-class match for South Australia in 1971/72. His brothers, Paul and Barry, also played first-class cricket for South Australia.

== See also ==
- List of South Australian representative cricketers
