= Westpoint, Tennessee =

- Unincorporated community
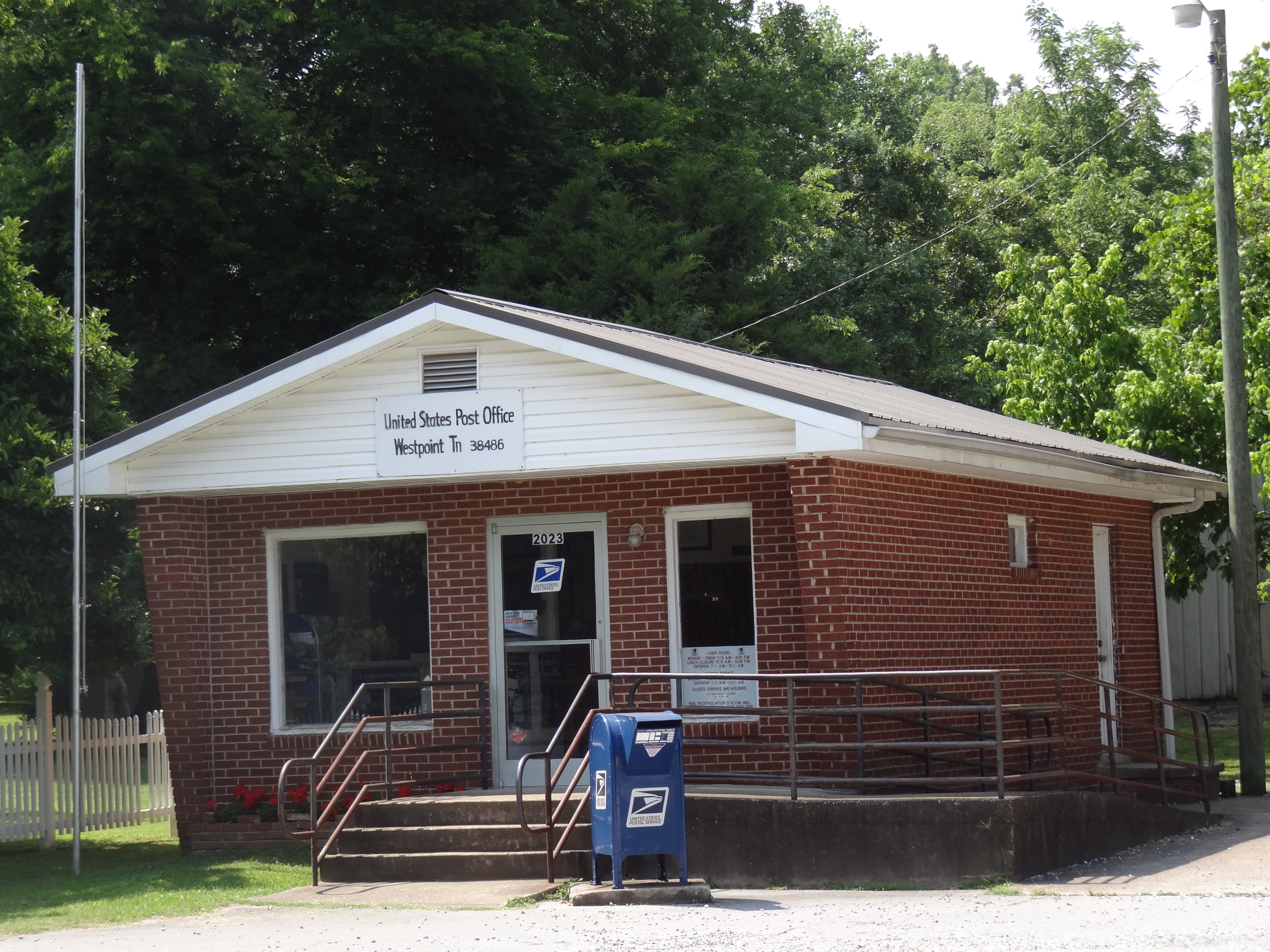
- Post office in Westpoint

- Location within Tennessee Location within the United States
- Coordinates: 35°07′59″N 87°32′01″W
- Country: United States
- State: Tennessee
- County: Lawrence

Area
  - Total: 0.90 sq mi (2.32 km^{2})
  - Land: 0.90 sq mi (2.32 km^{2})
  - Water: 0 sq mi (0.00 km^{2})
- Elevation: 623 ft (190 m)

Population (2020)
  - Total: 164
  - Density: 183.2/sq mi (70.74/km^{2})
- Time zone: UTC-6 (Central (CST))
  - Summer (DST): UTC-5 (CDT)
- ZIP code: 38486
- Area code: 931
- GNIS feature ID: 1304494

Westpoint (also West Point) is an unincorporated community in Lawrence County, Tennessee, United States. Its ZIP code is 38486.

== Demographics ==
Historical population
Census	Pop.	Note	%±
2020	164		—
U.S. Decennial Census
