= Gérard Calvet =

French Catholic abbot (1927–2008)

The Right Reverend Gérard Calvet, O.S.B.
- Abbot of Le Barroux Abbey
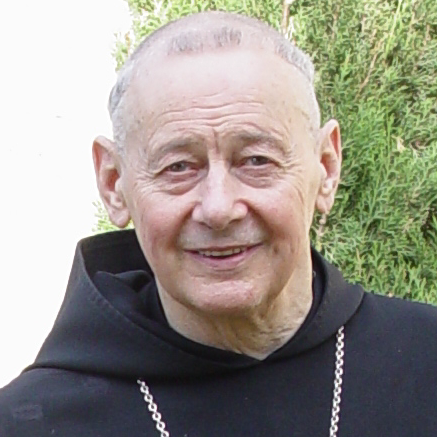
- Appointed: 2 July 1989
- Term ended: 25 November 2003
- Successor: Dom Louis-Marie de Geyer d'Orth

Orders
- Ordination: 13 May 1956

Personal details
- Born: Gérard Calvet; 18 November 1927 Bordeaux, France
- Died: 28 February 2008 (aged 80) Carpentras, France
- Denomination: Roman Catholic
- Motto: Per Te Virgo
- Coat of arms

Dom Gérard Calvet (18 November 1927 – 28 February 2008) was a French Catholic abbot and founder of the Sainte Madeleine du Barroux abbey in Le Barroux, France. He was considered to be an important figure in contemporary traditionalist Catholicism.

== Early life ==
Calvet was born in Bordeaux, Gironde on 18 November 1927. He took his vows to become a Benedictine monk in the Benedictine Abbey of Madiran on 4 February 1951. Calvet was ordained a Catholic priest on 13 May 1956. In 1963 he was sent to help with the foundation of a daughterhouse of his abbey in Tournay, Brazil.

Upon returning from Brazil in 1968 he found the religious life in the abbey completely changed in the aftermath of the Second Vatican Council. Feeling unable to live with those changes he asked for and received the permission to leave the abbey for some time. After having spent some time at Fontgombault Abbey and Montrieux Charterhouse, he settled down as a hermit in Bédoin 1970, again with the permission of his superiors.

== Foundation and Exclusion ==
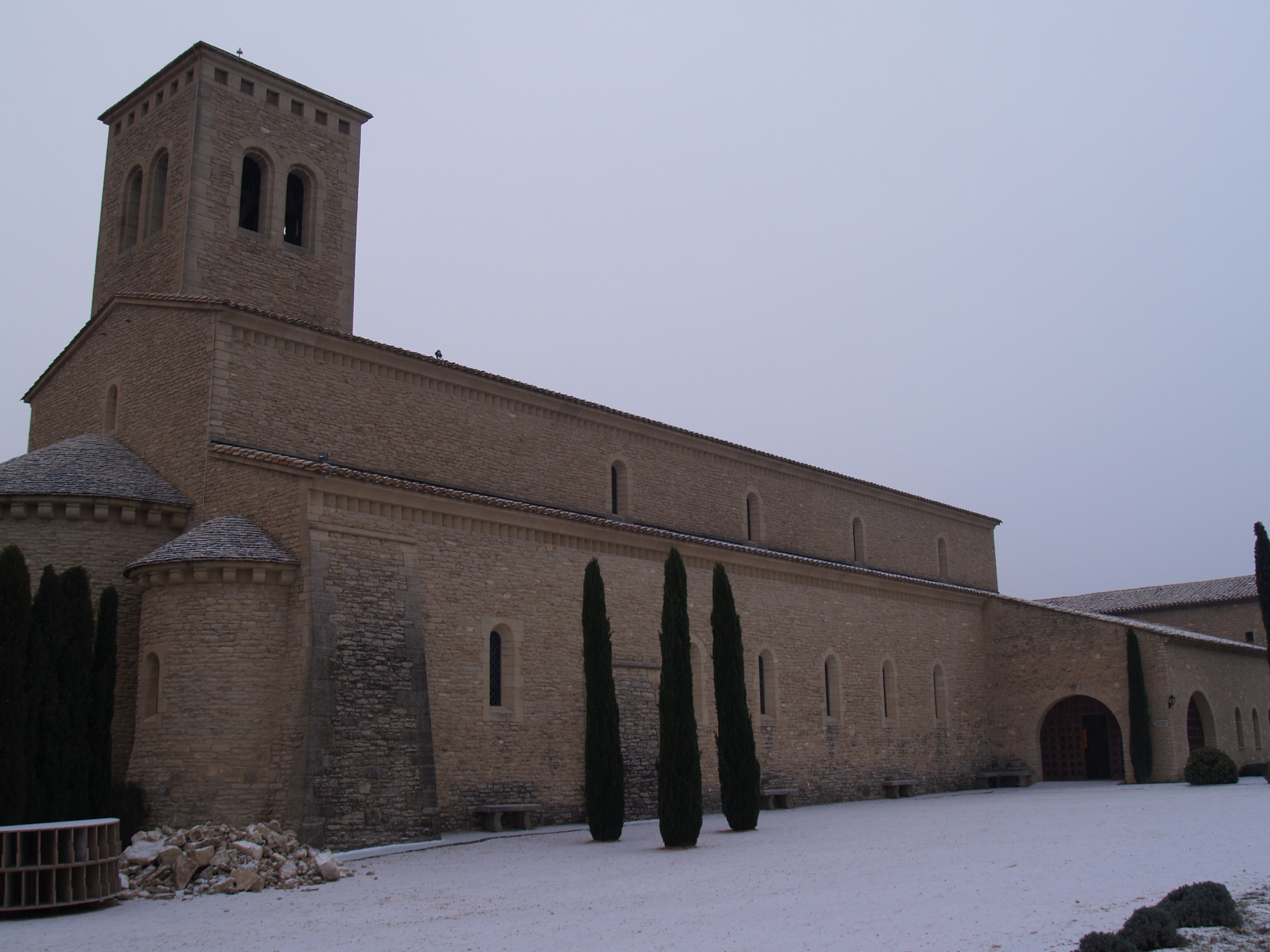
View of Sainte-Madeleine Abbey in winter

Shortly after beginning life as a hermit he was contacted by young men who aspired to become traditional Benedictine monks, but could not find the traditional life in the postconciliar monasteries. He accepted them as postulants, who still made their first vows into the hands of the abbot of Tournay. In 1974 he invited Archbishop Marcel Lefebvre to confer minor orders on the aspirants, for which he and his foundation were excluded from the Subiaco Congregation.

== Sainte-Madeleine du Barroux ==
After acquiring land near Le Barroux (Provence), France, construction of Sainte-Madeleine du Barroux Abbey began in 1980. The construction was completed during the 1980s. During the 1980s, Gérard Calvet was, together with Archbishop Lefebvre, one of the focal persons of the Traditionalist Catholic movement.

After having first supported the decision of Archbishop Lefebvre to ordain bishops, he decided he could not follow this way after having read an article about a Chinese Bishop who spent more than thirty years in prison for being obedient to the pope. Therefore, the monastery was reconciled with the Vatican in 1988 and elevated to an abbey in 1989, with Gérard Calvet being the first abbot.

From 18 to 27 September 2008 the Congress of Benedictine Abbots took place in Rome. The Confoederatio Benedictina Ordinis Sancti Benedicti, the Benedictine Confederation of the Order of Saint Benedict, admitted to its membership the Abbey of Sainte-Madeleine du Barroux (it also is listed now on the Confederation's website). The abbey, which is attached to the usus antiquior, continues to depend from the Pontifical Commission Ecclesia Dei. As the source for this news, the website of the French Bishops' Conference, puts it:

“This integration manifests that this community pursues its way of belonging to the normal structures of the Church and of fraternal collaboration with the monasteries of the Benedictine family.”

== Works ==
Calvet supported the foundation of the Chartres Pilgrimage, a three-day annual pilgrimage for traditional Catholics from Paris to Chartres, France. In 1986, he published Tomorrow Christendom, which sharply criticized the lack of Christian spirituality in Europe. He was considered to be an important figure in contemporary Catholic traditionalism.

== Death ==
Father Gérard Calvet died at the age of 80 on 28 February 2008. He had been in poor health since suffering a stroke in the late 1990s.
