= Werner Giesa =

German writer (1954–2008)

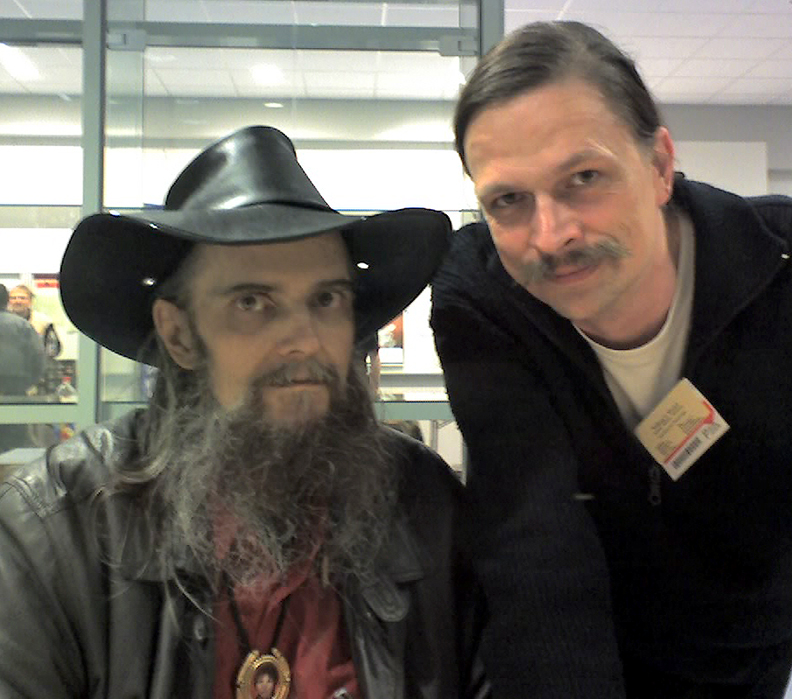
Werner K. Giesa

Werner Kurt Giesa (7 September 1954 in Hamm, North Rhine-Westphalia – 15 February 2008 in Altenstadt) was a German author. Since 1977 he mostly wrote fantasy novels, the majority of them dime novels for Bastei-Verlag. Until his death Giesa wrote more than 800 novels in various genres such as horror and science fiction. His main work was the supernatural mystery series Professor Zamorra, which he wrote under the pseudonym Robert Lamont.
