= Ārijs Geikins =

Latvian playwright, writer, director, actor and drama teacher

Ārijs Geikins (14 February 1936 – 10 February 2008) was a Latvian playwright, writer, director, actor and drama teacher. He was best known for his 1982 play, Leģenda par Kaupo.
