= Al Forat =

Shiite satellite channel owned by Ammar al-Hakim

Alforat TV Satellite Channel قناة الفرات الفضائية
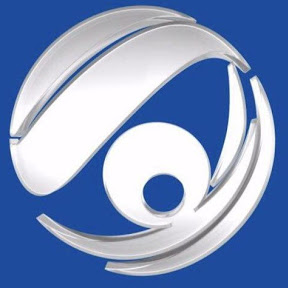
- Type: Satellite television network
- Country: Iraq
- Availability: Middle East
- Owner: Ammar al-Hakim
- Official website: www.alforattv.com (in Arabic)

Al Forat Network (Arabic: قناة الفرات الفضائية) is a satellite television network in Iraq. The Arabic language network is owned by Ammar al-Hakim, an Iraqi Shi'a cleric and politician. Al-Forat has 300 employees, with offices located in the Karrada district in Baghdad.
