= Alaa Abdulkareem Fartusi =

Iraqi journalist

Alaa Abdulkareem Fartusi (4 August 1978 – 10 February 2008) was an Iraqi journalist for Al Forat, a Shiite-backed satellite news station.

== Career ==
Fartusi had worked as a camera man for Al Forat for two years prior to his death in 2008. Fellow Al Forat reporter Ahmed Mehdi said of him:

Apart from being a colleague, he was a very good friend. He was always optimistic, always happy. If there was sadness, he would be the one smiling trying to console everyone. We miss him as a friend more than anything else.

== Death ==
Fartusi was part of a crew traveling to Samarra for a story commemorating the 2nd anniversary of the February 2006 bombing of the Golden Mosque, one of the holiest Shiite sites in Iraq. On 10 February 2008, while travelling to Samarra, a roadside bomb was detonated, killing Fartusi and the driver of the vehicle in which he was travelling. According to Mehdi, Fartusi and his team were probably not targeting the station. The first journalist killed in Iraq in 2008, Fartusi was survived by his wife and two children.
