= USS Pueblo =

USS Pueblo may refer to:

- USS Colorado (ACR-7), an armored cruiser, renamed Pueblo (CA-7), and served from 1905 until 1927
- USS Pueblo (PF-13), a Tacoma-class frigate, that served from 1944 until 1947
- USS Pueblo (AGER-2), a US Navy spy ship (Navy intelligence), boarded and captured by North Korea in 1968, still currently in commission
