= Anna Andreeva (artist) =

Russian textile designer

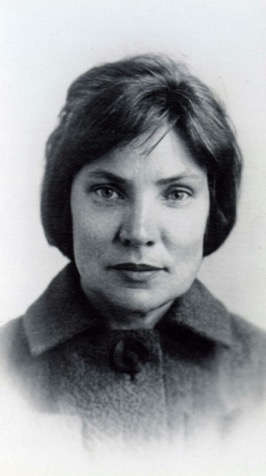
- Born: Anna Alexeevna Prasolova; 17 August 1917; Tambov, Russian Empire
- Died: 27 February 2008 (aged 90); Moscow, Russia
- Known for: Textile design
- Awards: Repin's All-Union Prise for the textile design: "Borodino" 1961; Lenin's All Union Award for the textile design "Moscow streets" 1959

Anna Andreeva (Russian: Анна Алексеевна Андреева) (August 17, 1917 – February 27, 2008) was a Russian textile designer. Andreeva was a leading artist at the Red Rose Silk Factory in Moscow from 1946 until 1984.

== Career ==
Andreeva's textile designs for mass production, "Cubes", "Olympics”, “Urban Grid”, “Soviet Sport”, and “Soviet Cosmos,” were among the most popular prints distributed within Socialist Republics in the 1960s and 1970s and were often published in the magazine Decorative Arts of the USSR (Dekorativnoe Iskusstvo SSSR).

She is also the author of the iconic Soviet optical geometric and floral prints that were presented at the International Textile Exhibitions and even traded by the Soviet government to French and Italian textile industries. Beyond her extensive work for mass production, Andreeva was often called to prepare exclusive designs for governmental purposes. Silk shawls after her drawings were presented Soviet official delegations to the political leaders of other countries as part of cultural diplomacy. Her work “Cosmos”, dedicated to the first man in space Yuri Gagarin, was an official present to the Queen Elizabeth II during Nikita Khrushchev’s first visit to the United Kingdom in 1961. Her design for the World Congress of Women became a symbol of the Fifth World Congress of Women, Moscow, July 24–29, 1963. During the 60s Andreeva created several designs for the International Movie Festival in Moscow. As a decorative artist working on state commissions for festivals and international exhibitions, she was granted more freedom to experiment with techniques and motifs than her fine arts peers.

Her series "Electrification," which included large geometric tapestries, served as the central objects at the All Union Exhibition of the Fortieth Anniversary of the October Revolution at the Saint Petersburg Manege. Her work is also known as the Soviet analogue of Optical Art. Andreeva's designs represented the Soviet textile industry at Expo 1967 in Montreal. Along with Soviet costume designer Alla Levasheva, Andreeva constructed a special exhibition platform of Soviet textile ideas at Expo 1970 in Tokyo.

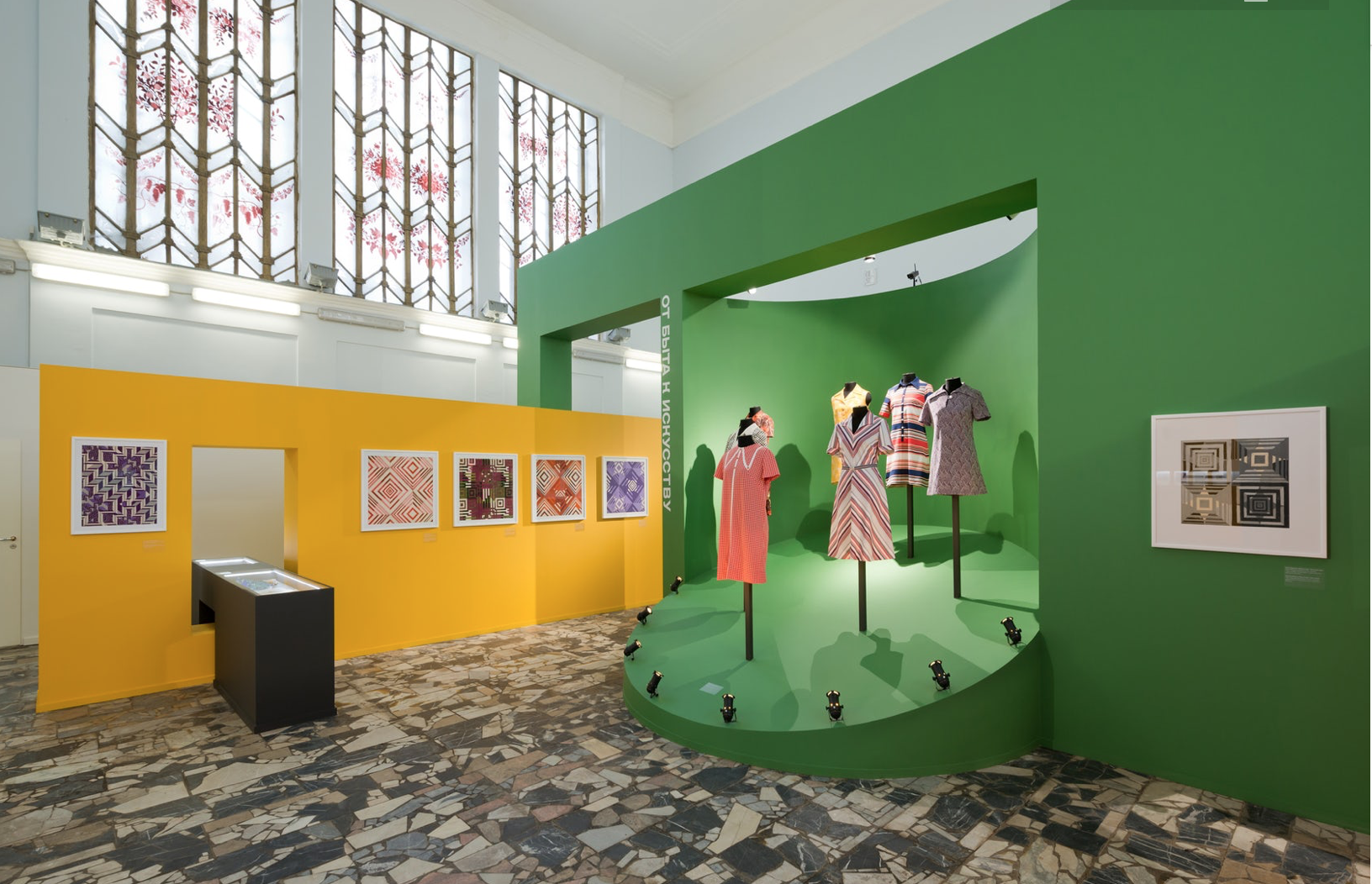
Exhibition "History of Fashion", VDNKH, 2015

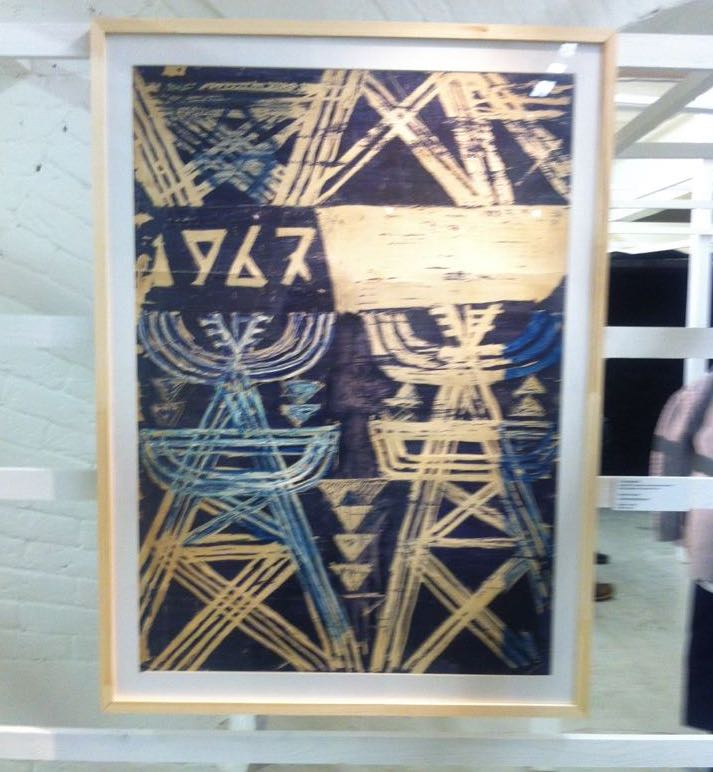
Еxhibition "The Thaw", Museum of Moscow, 2017

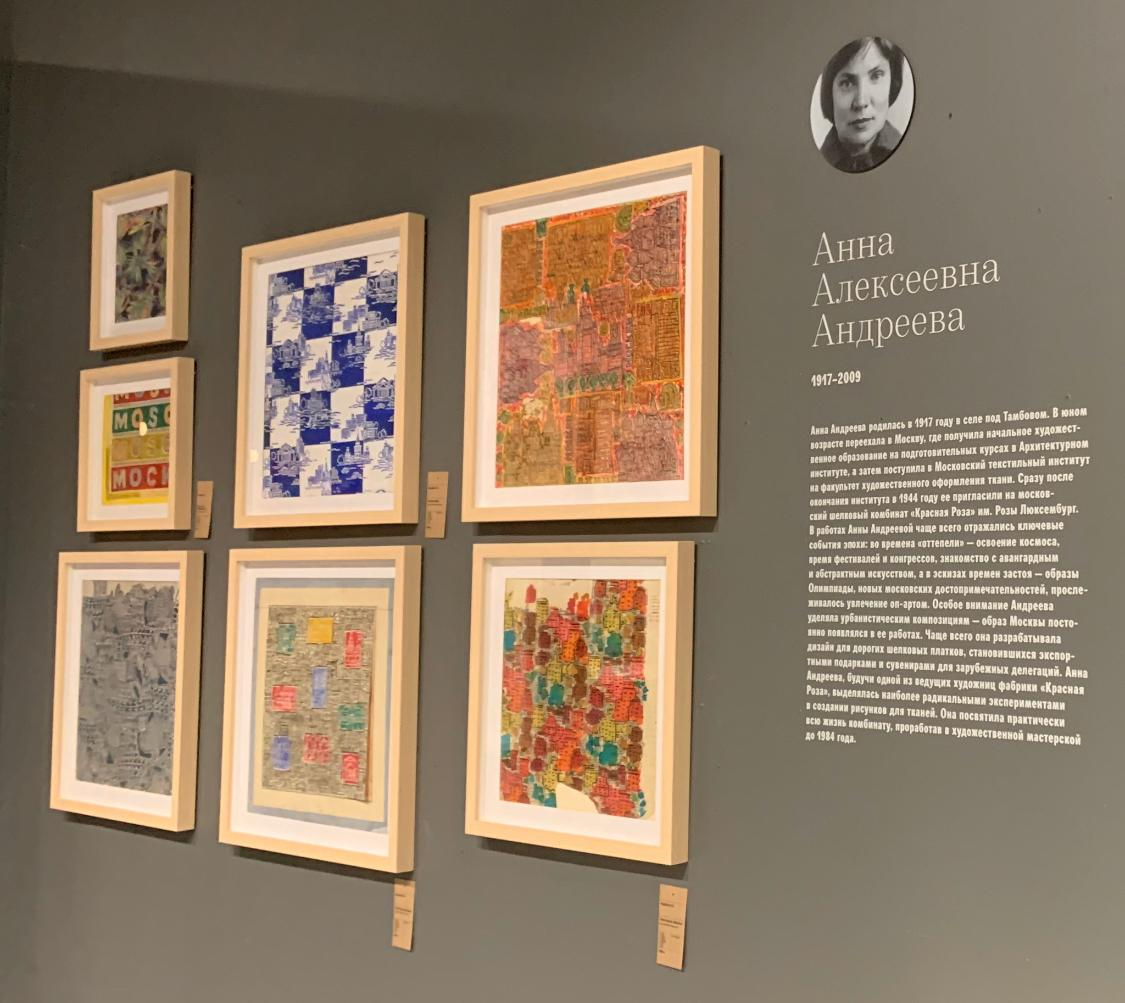
Еxhibition "Moscow Fabrics", Museum of Moscow, 2019

Andreeva held several key positions in the Artists' Union of the USSR, which she joined in 1946. From 1960 to 1970 she was the head of its Textile and Decorative Arts section. She was also in charge of establishing networks for the textile industry and silk production within the Socialist Bloc. She supervised artistic committees at silk factories in Central Asia, Georgia, Armenia, and the Urals, as well as sanatoriums for the Union.

== Early life and education ==
Andreeva was born in 1917 into a wealthy family of Russian merchants. When the family's home was seized by the Red Army, 9 year-old Andreeva fled to Moscow to live with distant relatives. Prior to entering the Moscow Textile Institute, Andreeva attended the Rabfak School of Workers. She entered the lab of Vladimir Favorsky and Igor Grabar.

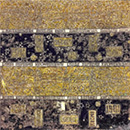
"Glory to the first cosmonaut". Design for commemorative silk scarf to be donated to Queen Elizabeth II, 1961.

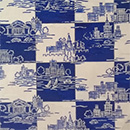
"Moscow Urban Scale" Design for Textile, Moscow, 1964.

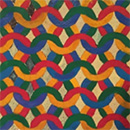
"Moscow Olympics" Design for children's textile on the occasion of the Moscow Summer Olympics, 1980.

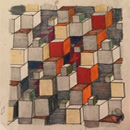
"Cubes" Design for Textile

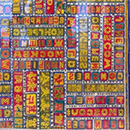
World Congress of Women, Moscow, 1963. Design for commemorative silk scarf.

== Awards and honors ==
- Repin's All-Union Prise for the textile design: “Borodino” 1961
- Lenin's All Union Award for the textile design “Moscow streets” 1959
- Andreeva's designs for textile are in the Collections: State Tretyakov Gallery Moscow, Tzarizyno State Gallery Moscow

== Personal ==
Her spouse was Boris Andreev (1916-1996), a Soviet scientist and engineer.
