= Laura Urdapilleta =

- Born: February 2, 1932; Guadalajara, Jalisco, Mexico
- Died: February 11, 2008 (aged 76)
- Occupation: ballet dancer

Laura Urdapilleta (February 2, 1932 – February 11, 2008) was primaballerina of the national Mexican dance company (Spanish: Compañía Nacional de Danza), known as the "Ballerina of Mexico" (Spanish: La Bailarina de México).

== Biography ==
Urdapilleta was born in Guadalajara, Jalisco. She studied ballet dancing under Olga Escalona and Nelsy Dambré from 1941 to 1945, and also under Gloria Campobello, Michael Panieff and Sergio Francheli. In 1947, at the age of 15, she had her professional debut on stage of the city theater of Mexico City. In 1978 she became art director of the ensemble. She also established a school of classical ballet in the Ciudad Juárez.

Urdapilleta was awarded with the gold medal of fine arts, with the gold medal of the government of Jalisco, a medal at the Festival Internacional de la Plata and with the keys of Córdoba, Veracruz.
