= Samuel Boyle (journalist) =

American journalist

Samuel J. Boyle IV (September 25, 1948 – February 3, 2008), known as Sam Boyle, served for two decades as Chief of The Associated Press' New York City bureau. He oversaw AP's coverage of high-profile events, including the 2001 terrorist attacks on the World Trade Center.

He was born in Philadelphia to a newspaper family. His father, Samuel Boyle, III, was a newspaper editor. An uncle, Robert Boyle, was an innovative editor for the Pottstown Mercury. His younger brother, Bill Boyle (who died in 2007 from cancer), had a long career including editorships in Philadelphia and at the New York Daily News for 21 years, where he rose to senior managing editor.

Sam Boyle joined the AP in Newark, New Jersey in 1971, then transferred to the Philadelphia bureau in 1972. Over the next 7 years he moved from AP's political desk to the national desk at NYC headquarters, and then to deputy business editor. In 1981, Sam Boyle was appointed chief of bureau for West Virginia, and the following year he was named bureau chief in New York City.

With his wife, Suzanne O'Brien, he was active in animal rescue projects, finding homes for strays and adopting half a dozen dogs, including some older ones.

He died of lung cancer on February 3, 2008, aged 59, after a long illness. Just a few months previously he was forced, due to his illness, to relinquish his role as an adjunct faculty member at Columbia University's Graduate School of Journalism, where he had taught for nearly two years.
