= The Best American Short Stories 2016 =

Book edited by Junot Diaz and Heidi Pitlor

- Editor: Junot Díaz and Heidi Pitlor
- Language: English
- Series: The Best American Short Stories
- Media type: Print (hardback & paperback)
- ISBN: 9780547868868 (paperback)
- Preceded by: The Best American Short Stories 2015
- Followed by: The Best American Short Stories 2017

The Best American Short Stories 2016, a volume in the Best American Short Stories series, was edited by Heidi Pitlor and by guest editor Junot Díaz.

== Short stories included ==
Author	Story	Where story previously appeared
Chimamanda Ngozi Adichie	"Apollo"	The New Yorker
Mohammed Naseehu Ali	"Ravalushan"	BOMB
Tahmima Anam	"Garments"	Freeman's
Andrea Barrett	"Wonders of the Shore"	Tin House
Sarah Shun-Lien Bynum	"The Bears"	Glimmer Train
Ted Chiang	"The Great Silence"	e-flux journal
Louise Erdrich	"The Flower"	The New Yorker
Yalitza Ferreras	"The Letician Age"	Colorado Review
Lauren Groff	"For the God of Love, for the Love of God"	American Short Fiction
Meron Hadero	"The Suitcase"	Missouri Review
Smith Henderson	"Treasure State"	Tin House
Lisa Ko	"Pat + Sam"	Copper Nickel
Ben Marcus	"Cold Little Bird"	The New Yorker
Caille Millner	"The Politics of the Quotidian"	ZYZZYVA
Daniel J. O'Malley	"Bridge"	Alaska Quarterly Review
Karen Russell	"The Prospectors"	The New Yorker
Yuko Sakata	"On This Side"	Iowa Review
Sharon Solwitz	"Gifted"	New England Review
Héctor Tobar	"Secret Stream"	ZYZZYVA
John Edgar Wideman	"Williamsburg Bridge"	Harper's Magazine
