= The Best American Short Stories 2015 =

- Editor: T. C. Boyle and Heidi Pitlor
- Language: English
- Series: The Best American Short Stories
- Media type: Print (hardback & paperback)
- ISBN: 9780547868868 (paperback)
- Preceded by: The Best American Short Stories 2014
- Followed by: The Best American Short Stories 2016

The Best American Short Stories 2015, a volume in the Best American Short Stories series, was edited by Heidi Pitlor and by guest editor T. C. Boyle.

== Short stories included ==
Author	Story	Where story previously appeared
Megan Mayhew Bergman	"The Siege at Whale Cay"	The Kenyon Review
Justin Bigos	"Fingerprints"	McSweeney's
Kevin Canty	"Happy Endings"	New Ohio Review
Diane Cook	"Moving On"	Tin House
Julia Elliott	"Bride"	Conjunctions
Louise Erdrich	"The Big Cat"	The New Yorker
Ben Fowlkes	"You'll Apologize If You Have To"	Crazyhorse
Arna Bontemps Hemenway	"The Fugue"	Alaska Quarterly Review
Denis Johnson	"The Largesse of the Sea Maiden"	The New Yorker
Sarah Kokernot	"M & L"	West Branch
Victor Lodato	"Jack, July"	The New Yorker
Colum McCann	"Sh'khol"	Zoetrope
Elizabeth McCracken	"Thunderstruck"	StoryQuarterly
Thomas McGuane	"Motherlode"	The New Yorker
Maile Meloy	"Madame Lazarus"	The New Yorker
Shobha Rao	"Kavitha and Mustafa"	Nimrod
Joan Silber	"About My Aunt"	Tin House
Aria Beth Sloss	"North"	One Story
Laura Lee Smith	"Unsafe at Any Speed"	New England Review
Jess Walter	"Mr. Voice"	Tin House
