= The Best American Short Stories 2013 =

Short story collection

- Editor: Elizabeth Strout and Heidi Pitlor
- Language: English
- Series: The Best American Short Stories
- Media type: Print (hardback & paperback)
- ISBN: 9780547554822 (paperback)
- Preceded by: The Best American Short Stories 2012
- Followed by: The Best American Short Stories 2014

The Best American Short Stories 2013, a volume in the Best American Short Stories series, was edited by Heidi Pitlor and by guest editor Elizabeth Strout. In her introduction Strout noted that she did not chose a story "primarily based on its subject," but that, for her, "voice" was a stronger criterion:

That sound – if it is working well – has authority, probably the most important dimension of voice. We really hope the writer knows what he or she is doing. And we really hope that this sense of authority will be sustained throughout. We look for this the same way we look for authoritative competence in any other trade… I don’t think readers think about this analytically, but instead, they experience it as a feeling about the writer that grows stronger as they read… (p. xiv)

In the Kirkus Reviews review the volume was found praiseworthy and that " the Contributors’ Notes on the stories are fascinating", but also noted that it is "lighter on discovery and revelation than some previous annuals". In a review by Naomi Huffman in New City Lit the collection is considered to live up to its name and found to feature "no duds, even if a couple of the stories aren’t quite as good as the rest.

== Short stories included ==
Author	Story	Where story previously appeared
Daniel Alarćon	"The Provincials"	Granta (Winter 2012, No. 118)
Charles Baxter	"Bravery"	Tin House (Vol. 14, No. 1)
Michael Byers	"Malaria"	Bellevue Literary Review (Fall 2012, Vol. 12, No. 2)
Junot Díaz	"Miss Lora"	The New Yorker (April 23, 2012)
Karl Taro Greenfeld	"Horned Men"	ZYZZYVA (Fall 2012, No. 95)
Gish Jen	"The Third Dumpster"	Granta (Summer 2012, No. 120)
Bret Anthony Johnston	"Encounters with Unexpected Animals"	Esquire (March 2012)
Sheila Kohler	"Magic Man"	The Yale Review (Spring 2012, Vol. 100, No. 2)
David Means	"The Chair"	The Paris Review (Spring 2012, Nr. 200)
Steven Millhauser	"A Voice in the Night"	The New Yorker (December 10, 2012)
Lorrie Moore	"Referential"	The New Yorker (May 28, 2012)
Alice Munro	"Train"	Harper's Magazine (April 2012)
Antonya Nelson	"Chapter Two"	The New Yorker (March 26, 2012)
Kirstin Valdez Quade	"Nemecia"	Narrative Magazine(Fall 2012)
Suzanne Rivecca	"Philanthropy"	Granta (Summer 2012, Nr. 120)
George Saunders	"The Semplica-Girl Diaries"	The New Yorker (October 15, 2012)
Jim Shepard	"The World to Come"	One Story (March 2012)
Elizabeth Tallent	"The Wilderness"	The Threepenny Review (Spring 2012)
Joan Wickersham	"The Tunnel, or The News from Spain"	Glimmer Train (Issue 82, Spring 2012)
Callan Wink	"Breatharians"	The New Yorker (October 22, 2012)
