= The Best American Short Stories 2012 =

- Editor: Tom Perotta and Heidi Pitlor
- Language: English
- Series: The Best American Short Stories
- Media type: Print (hardback & paperback)
- ISBN: 9780547242101 (paperback)
- Preceded by: The Best American Short Stories 2011
- Followed by: The Best American Short Stories 2013

The Best American Short Stories 2012, a volume in the Best American Short Stories series, was edited by Heidi Pitlor and by guest editor Tom Perotta.

== Short stories included ==
Author	Story	Where story previously appeared
Carol Anshaw	"The Last Speaker of the Language"	New Ohio Review
Taylor Antrim	"Pilgrim Life"	American Short Fiction
Nathan Englander	"What We Talk About When We Talk About Anne Frank"	The New Yorker
Mary Gaitskill	"The Other Place"	The New Yorker
Roxane Gay	"North Country"	Hobart
Jennifer Haigh	"Paramour"	Ploughshares
Mike Meginnis	"Navigators"	Hobart
Steven Millhauser	"Miracle Polish"	The New Yorker
Alice Munro	"Axis"	The New Yorker
Lawrence Osborne	"Volcano"	Tin House
Julie Otsuka	"Diem Perdidi"	Granta
Edith Pearlman	"Honeydew"	Orion
Angela Pneuman	"Occupational Hazard"	Ploughshares
Eric Puchner	"Beautiful Monsters"	Tin House
George Saunders	"Tenth of December"	The New Yorker
Taiye Selasi	"The Sex Lives of African Girls"	Granta
Sharon Solwitz	"Alive"	Fifth Wednesday Journal
Kate Walbert	"M&M World"	The New Yorker
Jess Walter	"Anything Helps"	Timothy McSweeney's Quarterly Concern
Adam Wilson	"What's Important is Feeling"	The Paris Review
