= The Best American Short Stories 2017 =

- Editor: Meg Wolitzer and Heidi Pitlor
- Language: English
- Series: The Best American Short Stories
- Media type: Print (hardback & paperback)
- ISBN: 9780547868868 (paperback)
- Preceded by: The Best American Short Stories 2016
- Followed by: The Best American Short Stories 2018

The Best American Short Stories 2017, a volume in the Best American Short Stories series, was edited by Heidi Pitlor and by guest editor Meg Wolitzer.

== Short stories included ==
Author	Story	Where story previously appeared
Chad B. Anderson	"Maidencane"	Nimrod
T. C. Boyle	"Are We Not Men?"	The New Yorker
Kevin Canty	"God's Work"	The New Yorker
Jai Chakrabarti	"A Small Sacrifice for an Enormous Happiness"	Public Space
Emma Cline	"Arcadia"	Granta
Leopoldine Core	"Hog for Sorrow"	BOMB
Patricia Engel	"Campoamor"	Chicago Quarterly Review
Danielle Evans	"Richard of York Gave Battle In Vain"	American Short Fiction
Mary Gordon	"Ugly"	Yale Review
Lauren Groff	"The Midnight Zone"	The New Yorker
Amy Hempel	"The Chicane"	Washington Square Review
Noy Holland	"Tally"	Epoch
Sonya Larson	"Gabe Dove"	Salamander
Fiona Maazel	"Let's Go to the Videotape"	Harper's Magazine
Kyle McCarthy	"Ancient Rome"	American Short Fiction
Eric Puchner	"Last Day on Earth"	Granta
Maria Reva	"Novostroïka"	The Atlantic
Jim Shepard	"Telemachus"	Zoetrope
Curtis Sittenfeld	"Gender Studies"	The New Yorker
Jess Walter	"Famous Actor"	Tin House
