= The Best American Short Stories 2010 =

- Editors: Richard Russo and Heidi Pitlor
- Language: English
- Series: The Best American Short Stories
- Publisher: Houghton Mifflin Harcourt
- Media type: Print (hardback & paperback)
- ISBN: 978-0-547-05528-2
- Preceded by: The Best American Short Stories 2009
- Followed by: The Best American Short Stories 2011

The Best American Short Stories 2010, a volume in The Best American Short Stories series, was edited by Heidi Pitlor and by guest editor Richard Russo.

== Short Stories included ==
| Author | Story | Where story previously appeared |
|---|---|---|
| Steve Almond | "Donkey Greedy, Donkey Gets Punched" | Tin House |
| Marlin Barton | "Into Silence" | The Sewanee Review |
| Charles Baxter | "The Cousins" | Tin House |
| Jennifer Egan | "Safari" | The New Yorker |
| Danielle Evans | "Someone Ought to Tell Her There's Nowhere to Go" | Public Space |
| Joshua Ferris | "The Valetudinarian" | The New Yorker |
| Lauren Groff | "Delicate Edible Birds" | Glimmer Train |
| Wayne Harrison | "Least Resistance" | The Atlantic |
| James Lasdun | "The Hollow" | The Paris Review |
| Rebecca Makkai | "Painted Ocean, Painted Ship" | Ploughshares |
| Brendan Matthews | "My Last Attempt to Explain What Happened to the Lion Tamer" | Cincinnati Review |
| Jill McCorkle | "PS" | The Atlantic |
| Kevin Moffett | "Further Interpretations of Real Life Events" | Timothy McSweeney's Quarterly Concern |
| Téa Obreht | "The Laugh" | The Atlantic |
| Lori Ostlund | "All Boy" | New England Review |
| Ron Rash | "The Ascent" | Tin House |
| Karen Russell | "The Seagull Army Descends on Strong Beach" | Tin House |
| Jim Shepard | "The Netherlands Lives With Water" | Timothy McSweeney's Quarterly Concern |
| Maggie Shipstead | "Cowboy Tango" | Virginia Quarterly Review |
| Wells Tower | "Raw Water" | Timothy McSweeney's Quarterly Concern |
