= The Best American Short Stories 2014 =

Short Stories

- Editor: Jennifer Egan and Heidi Pitlor
- Language: English
- Series: The Best American Short Stories
- Media type: Print (hardback & paperback)
- ISBN: 9780547868868 (paperback)
- Preceded by: The Best American Short Stories 2013
- Followed by: The Best American Short Stories 2015

The Best American Short Stories 2014, a volume in the Best American Short Stories series, was edited by Heidi Pitlor and by guest editor Jennifer Egan.

== Short stories included ==
| Author | Story | Where story previously appeared |
|---|---|---|
| Charles Baxter | "Charity" | McSweeney's |
| Ann Beattie | "The Indian Uprising" | Granta |
| T. C. Boyle | "The Night of the Satellite" | The New Yorker |
| Peter Cameron | "After the Flood" | Subtropics |
| Nicole Cullen | "Long Tom Lookout" | Idaho Review |
| Craig Davidson | "Medium Tough" | AGNI |
| Joshua Ferris | "The Breeze" | The New Yorker |
| Nell Freudenberger | "Hover" | Paris Review |
| David Gates | "A Hand Reached Down to Guide Me" | Granta |
| Lauren Groff | "At the Round Earth's Imagined Corners" | Five Points |
| Ruth Prawer Jhabvala | "The Judge's Will" | The New Yorker |
| O. A. Lindsey | "Evie M." | Iowa Review |
| Will Mackin | "Kattekoppen" | The New Yorker |
| Brendan Matthews | "This Is Not a Love Song" | Virginia Quarterly Review |
| Molly McNett | "La Pulchra Nota" | Image |
| Benjamin Nugent | "God" | Paris Review |
| Joyce Carol Oates | "Mastiff" | The New Yorker |
| Stephen O'Connor | "Next to Nothing" | Conjunctions |
| Karen Russell | "Madame Bovary's Greyhound" | Zoetrope |
| Laura van den Berg | "Antarctica" | Glimmer Train |
