= The Best American Short Stories 2011 =

- Editor: Geraldine Brooks and Heidi Pitlor
- Language: English
- Series: The Best American Short Stories
- Media type: Print (hardback & paperback)
- Preceded by: The Best American Short Stories 2010
- Followed by: The Best American Short Stories 2012

The Best American Short Stories 2011, a volume in the Best American Short Stories series, was edited by Heidi Pitlor and by guest editor Geraldine Brooks.

== Short stories included ==
Author	Story	Where story previously appeared
Chimamanda Ngozi Adichie	"Ceiling"	Granta
Megan Mayhew Bergman	"Housewifely Arts"	One Story
Tom Bissell	"A Bridge Under Water"	Agni
Jennifer Egan	"Out of Body"	Tin House
Nathan Englander	"Free Fruit for Young Widows"	The New Yorker
Allegra Goodman	"La Vita Nuova"	The New Yorker
Ehud Havazelet	"Gurov in Manhattan"	TriQuarterly
Caitlin Horrocks	"The Sleep"	The Atlantic Fiction for Kindle
Bret Anthony Johnston	"Soldier of Fortune"	Glimmer Train
Claire Keegan	"Foster"	The New Yorker
Sam Lipsyte	"The Dungeon Master"	The New Yorker
Rebecca Makkai	"Peter Torrelli, Falling Apart"	Tin House
Elizabeth McCracken	"Property"	Granta
Steven Millhauser	"Phantoms"	Timothy McSweeney's Quarterly Concern
Ricardo Nuila	"Dog Bites"	Timothy McSweeney's Quarterly Concern
Joyce Carol Oates	"ID"	The New Yorker
Richard Powers	"To the Measures Fall"	The New Yorker
Jess Row	"The Call of Blood"	Harvard Review
George Saunders	"Escape from Spiderhead"	The New Yorker
Mark Slouka	"The Hare's Mask"	Harper's Magazine
