= Smith Henderson =

American novelist

- Education: University of Montana (BA); Michener Center for Writers (MFA)
- Occupation: Novelist
- Writing career
- Notable works: Fourth of July Creek; "Treasure State"
- Notable awards: PEN Emerging Writers Award (2011); Philip Roth Residency in Creative Writing at Bucknell University (2011)
- Website: www.smith-henderson.com

Smith Henderson is an American fiction writer, and is the author of the novels Fourth of July Creek and (with Jon Marc Smith) Make Them Cry, as well as short stories published in Best American Short Stories, Tin House, American Short Fiction, One Story, and Witness.

His debut novel Fourth of July Creek was a bestseller and was named a Notable Book by the New York Times and the third best novel of the year according to Entertainment Weekly.

== Biography ==
Before becoming a novelist, Henderson studied classics at the University of Montana, then moved to Texas to work as a social worker and a prison guard. He also worked in advertising, helping to produce the Clint Eastwood/"Halftime in America" commercial for Chrysler that aired in February 2012 during halftime of Super Bowl XLVI.
