= The Best American Short Stories 2009 =

- Editor: Alice Sebold and Heidi Pitlor
- Language: English
- Series: The Best American Short Stories
- Media type: Print (hardback & paperback)
- Preceded by: The Best American Short Stories 2008
- Followed by: The Best American Short Stories 2010

The Best American Short Stories 2009, a volume in The Best American Short Stories series, was edited by Heidi Pitlor and by guest editor Alice Sebold.

== Short stories included ==
Author	Story	Where story previously appeared
Daniel Alarcón	"The Idiot President"	The New Yorker
Sarah Shun-Lien Bynum	"Yurt"	The New Yorker
Steve De Jarnatt	"Rubiaux Rising"	Santa Monica Review
Joseph Epstein	"Beyond the Pale"	Commentary
Alice Fulton	"A Shadow Table"	Tin House
Karl Taro Greenfeld	"NowTrends"	American Short Fiction
Eleanor Henderson	"The Farms"	Agni
Greg Hrbek	"Sagittarius"	Black Warrior Review
Adam Johnson	"Hurricanes Anonymous"	Tin House
Victoria Lancelotta	"The Anniversary Trip"	The Gettysburg Review
Yiyun Li	"A Man Like Him"	The New Yorker
Rebecca Makkai	"The Briefcase"	New England Review
Jill McCorkle	"Magic Words"	Narrative Magazine
Kevin Moffett	"One Dog Year"	Tin House
Richard Powers	"Modulation"	Conjunctions
Annie Proulx	"Them Old Cowboy Songs"	The New Yorker
Ron Rash	"Into the Gorge"	The Southern Review
Alex Rose	"Ostracon"	Ploughshares
Ethan Rutherford	"The Peripatetic Coffin"	American Short Fiction
Namwali Serpell	"Muzungu"	Callaloo
