= Slouka =

Slouka is a Czech masculine surname, its feminine counterpart is Slouková. The surname may refer to

- Mark Slouka (born 1958), American novelist and essayist of Czech origin
- Hubert Slouka, Czech astronomer
  - 3423 Slouka, a minor planet named after Hubert
