= Treasure State (disambiguation) =

The Treasure State is the official nickname of Montana, in the United States of America.

Treasure State may also refer to:

- "Treasure State" (short story), a short story by Montana-born writer Smith Henderson
- Treasure State (album), a 2010 album by Matmos and So Percussion

== See also ==
- List of U.S. state nicknames
