= Weijia Pan =

Chinese poet and translator

Weijia Pan is a Chinese poet and translator. In 2023, his debut poetry collection, Motherlands, was selected by Louise Glück for the Max Ritvo Poetry Prize and subsequently published by Milkweed Editions in 2024. A graduate of the University of Houston MFA program, Pan is a 2024–26 Stegner Fellow at Stanford University.

== Early life ==
Pan grew up in Shanghai and Nanjing in China. He later attended University of California, Los Angeles and graduated with a bachelor's degree in comparative literature.

== Career ==
Pan's poems have been published in AGNI, Cincinnati Review, New Ohio Review, Palette Poetry, Poetry Daily, and others.

In 2022, Pan's poem, "First Time to a Bathhouse", was a finalist for the Lorraine Williams Poetry Prize hosted by Georgia Review.

In 2023, during his third year at the University of Houston MFA program, Pan won the Inprint Paul Verlaine Prize in Poetry. The same year, he won the Form and Form-Breaking Poetry Contest with his poem, "Five Stretched Sapphics", which was selected by Diane Seuss.

In 2024, Pan's debut poetry collection, Motherlands, was published by Milkweed Editions after its selection for the Max Rivto Poetry Prize by Louise Glück in 2023. It is believed to be the last manuscript that Glück selected and edited prior to her death later that year. On September 5, 2024, Pan celebrated the launch of his debut with Chen Chen at Poets House. Publishers Weekly called Pan's debut "a surprising and striking collection."

Pan is a Stegner Fellow in poetry at Stanford University in the 2024–26 cohort. Pan is working on a second collection of poetry, a collected volume of poems by Chinese poet Huang Jiyun, and a global anthology of poems about the COVID-19 pandemic co-edited with other translators at the University of Houston.
