= Benjamin Nugent =

American writer

Benjamin Nugent is an American writer, best known for the book American Nerd: The Story of My People and Good Kids, a novel.

He is the author of the novel Good Kids (Scribner), the cultural history American Nerd (Scribner), and the short story collection Fraternity (Farrar, Straus & Giroux). His short stories have appeared in The Paris Review, Tin House, and Vice, and have been anthologized in The Best American Short Stories 2014 and The Unprofessionals: New American Writing from the Paris Review.

His journalism has appeared in The New York Times Magazine, The New York Times Op/Ed Page, Time, GQ, The Washington Post, The Atlantic, and n+1. He earned the Bachelor's in English from Reed College, and was an Arts Fellow at the Iowa Writers' Workshop at the University of Iowa, where he earned the MFA in fiction.
