= Joan Wickersham =

American writer

Joan Wickersham is an American writer. Her 2008 memoir about her father's suicide, The Suicide Index, was a finalist for the 2008 National Book Award for Nonfiction. She is an op-ed columnist for The Boston Globe as well as an architecture writer, with a regular column featured in Architecture Boston magazine. Her fiction writing has appeared in the literary magazines Agni, Glimmer Train, The Hudson Review, and Ploughshares. Her short story, "The Tunnel, or The News from Spain", was featured in The Best American Short Stories 2013.

== Education ==
She graduated from Yale University with a degree in art history.

== Career ==
Her memoir, The Suicide Index: Putting My Father's Death in Order, details her family's and her own struggles after her father's 1991 suicide. In an interview with Solstice Literary Magazine, Wickersham stated she began the memoir in 1995 with a conventional linear narrative written in the first and third person. After eight years of writing, she had completed a draft but was unable to sell it to any publishers. In 2003 Wickersham was granted an artist residency position at the MacDowell Program in New Hampshire. During the residency, she scrapped most of the draft, and approached the memoir from a novel perspective. The latter chapters of the memoir were re-written in index format, with different themes related to the tragedy alphabetized and expounded on by Wickersham in the following pages. Regarding this marked departure in lyrical style, Wickersham stated: "One of the other things that happened at MacDowell is that I decided to just do it in pieces and not worry about how the pieces were going to fit together for then. Just let it be the pieces." Reviewing the memoir for the Los Angeles Times, David Ulin noted that the subject of suicide is challenging to depict in literature, as the anguish of the deceased is often unknown to their loved ones. Ulin stated it is almost impossible to depict this unknown anguish in chronological format and challenging still to write about the grief of the loved ones of the deceased. Ulin stated that Wickersham's "ingenious" index format made depictions of grief that "transcends mere recollection, and it opens 'The Suicide Index' to the morass of emotions that her father's act stirs up."

Her 2012 collection of short stories entitled The News from Spain: Seven Variations on a Love Story featured seven short stories about loving relationships formed between an eclectic mix of characters. This includes a paralyzed ballet dancer forming a bond with her caregiver as the dancer's choreographer husband is on tour with the dance troupe and having an affair with another dancer. Other stories include a separated married couple re-kindling their love as they spend time together at a summer engagement party, and middle-aged Rebecca forming a bond whilst serving as a caregiver for her disabled mother. The collection was featured as one of the best books of the year by NPR. Writing for The New York Times, Tom Barbash states Wickersham adroitly depicted the subtleties of love, affection and yearning as relationships form, blossom or dissolve. Barbash also stated: "Occasionally Wickersham overindulges her characters' desire to pick at small hurts — you may find yourself needing a break." Writing in The Los Angeles Times, in a mixed review, David Ulin noted that some of the stories seemed "contrived, a series of stunts that show their seams." However, Ulin noted that other stories in the collection were open, lyrically showing the many ways love can develop, change, or die over time, with the most heartwarming story according to Ulin being the paralyzed ballet dancer and her caregiver Malcolm.
