= Halftime in America =

- Halftime in America screenshot
- Directed by: David Gordon Green
- Written by: Matthew Dickman
- Starring: Clint Eastwood
- Distributed by: Chrysler
- Release date: 2012
- Running time: 2 minutes
- Country: United States
- Language: English

Halftime in America (alternately, It's Halftime in America) is an American television commercial for Chrysler that aired in February 2012 during the halftime of Super Bowl XLVI. Produced by Portland, Oregon-based advertising agency Wieden+Kennedy, it features Clint Eastwood speaking, and narrating, an account of the American automobile industry rebounding after the Great Recession, as pictures of American workers appear onscreen.

The advertisement, described as "grim" in tone, is a two-minute montage of video scenes showing "ordinary Americans" at first despairing, then in solidarity with another, and finally hopeful. It closes with a close-up of Eastwood's face, and then the "Imported from Detroit" logo first introduced in Chrysler's 2011 Super Bowl advertisement.

== Production ==
The commercial was filmed in the Los Angeles Memorial Coliseum, New Orleans, and Northern California, with archival footage from Detroit and Madison, Wisconsin.

== Script ==
The script of this ad was prepared by Kevin Jones, Smith Henderson and Matthew Dickman. It is as follows:

It's halftime. Both teams are in their locker room discussing what they can do to win this game in the second half. It's halftime in America, too. People are out of work and they're hurting. And they're all wondering what they're going to do to make a comeback. And we're all scared, because this isn't a game.

The people of Detroit know a little something about this. They almost lost everything. But we all pulled together, now Motor City is fighting again. I've seen a lot of tough eras, a lot of downturns in my life. And, times when we didn't understand each other. It seems like we've lost our heart at times. When the fog of division, discord, and blame made it hard to see what lies ahead. But after those trials, we all rallied around what was right, and acted as one. Because that's what we do. We find a way through tough times, and if we can't find a way, then we'll make one.

All that matters now is what's ahead. How do we come from behind? How do we come together? And, how do we win? Detroit's showing us it can be done. And, what's true about them is true about all of us. This country can't be knocked out with one punch. We get right back up again and when we do the world is going to hear the roar of our engines. Yeah, it's halftime America. And, our second half is about to begin.

== Public reaction ==
The commercial became a viral video, and was compared to the Morning in America commercial in Ronald Reagan's 1984 presidential campaign.

The ad drew criticism from several leading U.S. conservatives, who saw the commercial as an endorsement of the United States automotive bailout of 2008 and 2009 that helped steer Chrysler out of bankruptcy protection. They also suggested that its messaging implied that President Barack Obama deserved a second term in office and, as such, was political payback for Obama's support for the federal bailout. Republican political consultant Karl Rove, who had been opposed to the automotive bailout, said he was "offended" by it, and called it a sign of Chicago-style politics. Asked about the criticism in a 60 Minutes interview with Steve Kroft, Sergio Marchionne, the CEO of Chrysler at the time, responded "just to rectify the record I paid back the loans at 19.7% Interest. I don't think I committed to do to a commercial on top of that" and characterized the Republican reaction as "unnecessary and out of place".

Additional discussion focused on a short scene in the commercial filmed at an evening protest held by members of a local education union at the Wisconsin State Capitol during the 2011 Wisconsin protests. For the commercial, video frames were digitally edited to replace pro-union, pro-public education messages on the picket signs, during a segment where Clint Eastwood's "gravely voice intones 'the fog, division, discord, and blame made it hard to see what lies ahead.'"
