= Kate Morgan Chadwick =

American actress and singer

- Other name: Katie Chadwick
- Education: Fordham University
- Occupations: Actress; singer; film producer; writer
- Years active: 2005–present
- Spouse: Clayton Apgar
- Father: Dr. David Chadwick
- Relatives: Margaret Lee Chadwick (grandmother)
- Website: katemorganchadwick.com

Kate Morgan Chadwick is an American actress, singer, film producer and writer whose work includes roles in Hail, Caesar! (2016), Rated (2016), Bed (2016) and Oh, Baby! (2020).

== Early life and education ==
Chadwick grew up in La Mesa, California, the youngest of two children, with brother Teddy, born to parents Michele West Chadwick and the late Dr. David Chadwick, and graduated from the private Francis Parker School in San Diego in 2001. As a child, she performed at San Diego Junior Theatre. She continued acting in high school and college, earning a bachelor of arts degree in theater performance from Fordham College at Lincoln Center. She also trained at Upright Citizens Brigade, an improvisational and comedy group.

== Career ==
Chadwick toured nationally on Broadway in 2009 in Grease, co-starring as Frenchy with Taylor Hicks. The play was produced on tour by Paul Nicholas and David Ian. The following year, she performed in the a cappella musical comedy Perfect Harmony at Off-Broadway's Acorn Theater at Theater Row in New York City.

In 2012, Chadwick played the role of the lovelorn schoolteacher Samantha in Nobody Loves You at San Diego's Old Globe Theater, which The New York Times called "a delightful chamber musical." That year she also co-starred as Private Lindsay Skinner in Bad Apples, a rock musical premiere about Abu Ghraib at Circle X Theatre Company in Los Angeles.

In 2013, Chadwick performed the song "Surrender," accompanied by composer/lyricists Beth Thornley and Rob Cairns, at the 44th Annual Los Angeles Drama Critics Circle Awards show. The following year, she co-wrote and produced the short film Dryve.

She performed with Josh Brolin in 2016's comedy film Hail, Caesar!, which was chosen by the National Board of Review as one of the year's top 10 films.

Also in 2016, Chadwick co-starred in Echo Theater Company's world premiere of Sheila Callaghan's play Bed at the Atwater Village Theatre. Broadway World called it "a funny, sexy and unconventional romance with music." Jennifer Chambers directed. Also in 2016, she again played Private Skinner in the play Bad Apples, this time at ACT Theatre in Seattle.

In 2017, she starred in an immersive theater production of Amos: A Play With Music at the Bootleg Theatre in Los Angeles. Play reviewer Noah J. Nelson with No Proscenium described it as "a new work by the writing team of Eva Anderson and Michael Cassady set within the world of Ukraine’s EDM scene."

Chadwick was cast in the lead role as Rebecca for the 2017 world premiere of Part of the Plan, a musical written by Kate Atkinson and Karen Harris and featuring the songbook of Dan Fogelberg, at the James K. Polk Theatre in Nashville, Tennessee. Chadwick and co-star Harley Jay previewed the play on WTVF's "Talk of the Town" show on News Channel 5, Fox's affiliate in Nashville. Chadwick, along with fellow cast members, also interviewed on tape with Out & About Nashville.

Guest television appearances include a lead role in Lifetime's My Crazy Ex, plus appearances in the Showtime series Shameless and TNT's Major Crimes.

Chadwick was executive producer, co-writer and star of Oh, Baby! a short film green-lighted by Seed&Spark and in post production in August 2019. It co-stars actor T.J. Linnard, with director and co-writer Brooke Trantor, producer and assistant director Danielle Argyros, executive producer Arden Grier, director of photography Kara Johnson, and unit production manager Courtney Stewart. The film showed at the San Diego International Film Festival in October 2021. Before that, it won the Best in Block audience award at the Blackbird Film Festival and the audience award for best short film at the Dances With Films festival. It was also nominated for best narrative short at the 2020 Florida Film Festival.

== Reception ==
Chadwick received multiple reviews for her performance as Rebecca in the production of Part of the Plan (2017). Out & About Nashville described her portrayal as "a powerful performance" that was "sweet, but incredibly strong." The Williamson Herald called the character of Rebecca "played brilliantly by Kate Morgan Chadwick," while Broadway World Nashville described the performance as "played with unyielding grace and authenticity by Kate Morgan Chadwick."

The Los Angeles Times, in its review of Bed at the Echo Theater Company in Los Angeles, in which Chadwick played the character Holly, called her performance "fiery" and the actors "convincing." LA Weekly wrote, "Chadwick’s conclusive and full-blooded portrayal of a character that comes off as sort of a charismatic, riot grrrl–reoriented Courtney Love by way of Kathleen Hanna." On State & Screen wrote, "Chadwick in particular has a magnetic stage presence."ArtsBeatLA called her portrayal of Holly as "played brilliantly by Kate Morgan Chadwick."

Theater critic Stephen Fife, writing about the Stage Raw Awards event in May 2017, described Chadwick, who appeared on stage in casual attire to accept her award, as "alive to the comic possibilities of the moment."

In a review of Bad Apples, LA Weekly wrote that Chadwick's role as Lindsay Skinner was "outstanding." Natalie Pace with Huffington Post, in its review ofBad Apples, wrote, "... I found myself close to tears in the third act, when Kate Morgan Chadwick sings, 'Nothing Sweeter Than Surrender'." LAist wrote that Chadwick's "comedic timing is sharp."

In 2021, The Music City Drive-In reviewed Oh, Baby!, describing Chadwick's role as "a multi-facet performance that is downright perfect." Reel News Daily wrote that "Trantor and Chadwick easily capture the humor and anxiety that come along with dating, in general. Heightening that concept with impending childbirth gives Oh, Baby! a modern twist."

== Acting and producing recognition ==
=== Awards ===
- Oh, Baby!, a short film co-produced by and starring Chadwick, won Best in Block audience award at the Blackbird Film Festival.
- Oh, Baby! won Audience Award for Best Short Film at Dances With Films festival.
- Named First Night's Top Ten Outstanding Actresses in a Musical for 2018 of the best in Tennessee theater for her performance in Part of the Plan.
- Placed 2nd at the 2017 Broadway World Nashville Regional Awards for Best Actress in a Musical for Part of the Plan while the play itself placed first for Best New Work.
- Named "Leading Female Performance" at Stage Raw awards ceremony on May 15, 2017, at the Los Angeles Theatre Center for her work in The Echo Theater Company's production of Bed by Sheila Callaghan.
- Winner of the 2002 National Youth Arts Award as Miss Adelaide in San Diego Junior Theatre's Guys and Dolls production.

=== Nominations ===
- Oh, Baby! nominated for best narrative short at the 2020 Florida Film Festival.
- Nominated for a Gregory Award in 2017 for her theater role as Lindsay Skinner in Bad Apples.
- Nominated for 2016 Ovation Award's "Lead Actress in a Play" for her role in Bed.
- Also for Bed, nominated for "Best Lead Performance" from the 2016 Los Angeles Drama Critics Circle.
- 2016 Gypsy Rose Lee Award nomination in the category "Excellence in Performance in a Musical as a Lead Actor (Female)" for her performance in Bad Apples.
- Nominated in 2013 for L.A. Weekly Theater Award's "Female Musical Performance" for her role in Bad Apples.
- Nominated for 2013 Ovation Award for "Lead Actress in a Musical" for her role as Lindsay Skinner in Bad Apples.

== Personal life ==
In 2013, Chadwick married Clayton Apgar, an actor who now works in career recruitment. The couple moved from Los Angeles to Chadwick's hometown of La Mesa in 2021 with their son Cal. She is the granddaughter of Margaret Lee Chadwick and Cmdr. Joseph Chadwick, founders of Chadwick School on the Palos Verdes Peninsula in Los Angeles County.

== Filmography ==
=== Film ===
| Year | Title | Role | Director | Notes |
|---|---|---|---|---|
| 2020 | Oh, Baby! | Jane | Brooke Trantor | Short film |
| 2017 | Plea | Jill Sandy | Joseph Oppenheimer | Short film |
| 2016 | Rated | Julie | John Fortson | Short film |
| 2016 | Hail, Caesar | Departing Woman | Ethan Coen, Joel Coen | |
| 2014 | Dryve | Kate | | Short film |
| 2014 | Rojas and Retribution | Principle role | Daniel Porter | Short film |
| 2013 | Imprints | Sarah | Anthony Sellitti | Short film |

=== Television ===
| Year | Title | Role | Episode |
|---|---|---|---|
| 2017 | The Young and the Restless | Betsy | #1.11125 |
| 2015 | Shameless | Shana | "Love Songs" |
| 2014 | Major Crimes | Katherine 'Kiki' Weinberger | "Cutting Loose" |
| 2013 | Jules and Jess | Melissa | "The Dating Game" |
| 2012 | Happy Endings | Waitress | "Cocktails & Dreams" |
| 2011–12 | Whatever, the Series | Mickey | 5 episodes |

== Theatre ==
| Year | Title | Role | Notes |
|---|---|---|---|
| 2006-07 | Mamma Mia! | Ali | Las Vegas production at Mandalay Bay |
| 2008-10 | Grease | Frenchy | Broadway tour |
| 2010 | The Butcherhouse Chronicles | Honey | Off-Broadway |
| 2010 | Perfect Harmony | Mickey D | Theatre Row, New York |
| 2010 | Stupid Kids | Judy | The Red Room, New York |
| 2010 | The History of Tears | Veronika/Lotte | Theatre Row, New York |
| 2010 | The American Dream | Mrs. Barker | Arthur Saleen Theatre, New York |
| 2012 | Bad Apples | Private Lindsay Skinner | Circle X Theatre, Los Angeles |
| 2012 | Nobody Loves You | Samantha, Bonnie | Old Globe Theater, San Diego |
| 2016 | Bed | Holly | Atwater Village Theatre, Los Angeles |
| 2012 | Bad Apples | Lindsay | Circle X Theatre, Los Angeles |
| 2017 | Part of the Plan | Rebecca (lead) | James K. Polk Theatre, Nashville |
| 2017 | Amos: A Play With Music | Viktor’s muse (lead) | Bootleg Theatre, Los Angeles |
