= Elissa Schappell =

American writer and publisher

- Education: New York University (MFA)
- Occupations: Novelist; short story writer; editor; essayist
- Spouse: Rob Spillman

Elissa Schappell is an American novelist, short-story writer, editor and essayist. She was a co-founder and editor of the literary magazine Tin House.

== Writing career ==
Schappell graduated from New York University with an MFA in creative writing. Her first job in publishing was with Spy magazine in the 1980s.

Schappell's first book of fiction, Use Me, a collection of 10 linked short stories, was published in 2000 by William Morrow, and was runner-up for the PEN/Hemingway Award. A second book of fiction, Blueprints for Building Better Girls, was published by Simon & Schuster in 2011. It was chosen as a "Best Book of the Year" by The San Francisco Chronicle, The Boston Globe, The Wall Street Journal Newsweek/The Daily Beast, and O, The Oprah Magazine.

Schappell's articles, fiction, interviews and essays have been published in magazines including GQ, Vogue, Spin, BOMB, One Story and Nerve. She has written book reviews for The New York Times, Bookforum, and The Daily Telegraph. She was the longtime author of the "Hot Type" book column in Vanity Fair, where she is also a contributing editor.

Schappell was one of the founders and editors of the literary magazine Tin House. She was previously a Senior Editor at The Paris Review.

Schappell teaches at schools including Columbia University, NYU, and Queens University.

== Personal life ==
Originally from Delaware, Schappell now lives in Brooklyn. She is married to Rob Spillman, with whom she co-founded Tin House.

== Publications ==
- "Novice Bitch" in the anthology The KGB Bar Reader (1998)
- Use Me (William Morrow, 2000)
- Contributed an article about Allen Ginsberg to The Paris Review anthology Beat Writers at Work
- "Crossing the Line in the Sand: How Mad Can Mother Get?" in The Bitch in the House: 26 Women Tell the Truth About Sex, Solitude, Work, Motherhood, and Marriage (2002)
- "That sort of woman" in The Mrs Dalloway Reader (2003)
- "Sex and the Single Squirrel" in Cooking and Stealing: The Tin House Nonfiction Reader (2004)
- Co-edited and contributed to The Friend Who Got Away: Twenty Women's True-Life Tales of Friendships That Blew Up, Burned Out or Faded Away
- Essay on Naked Lunch in Bound to Last: 30 Writers on Their Most Cherished Book (2010)
- Blueprints for Building Better Girls (Simon & Schuster, 2011)
- "High-Strung Knitter" in Knitting Yarns: Writers on Knitting (2013)
