= Rady Children's Hospital =

Coordinates: 32°47′53″N 117°09′04″W

Rady Children's Hospital San Diego

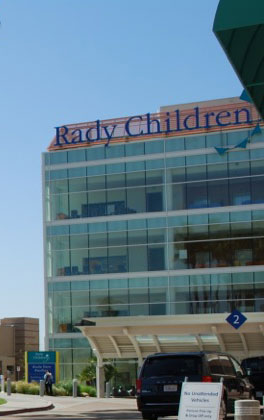
- Main entrance

Geography
- Location: 3020 Children's Way, San Diego, California, United States

Organization
- Type: Teaching
- Affiliated university: UC San Diego School of Medicine

Services
- Emergency department: Level I Regional Pediatric Trauma Center
- Beds: 511 licensed beds (as of January 2024)
- Speciality: Pediatrics and pediatric subspecialties

Helipads
- Helipad: FAA LID: CN17

History
- Founded: 1954

Links
- Website: www.rchsd.org
- Lists: Hospitals in California

Rady Children's Hospital San Diego is a nonprofit pediatric care facility. Rady Children's provides services to the San Diego, southern Riverside and Imperial counties. The hospital has 511 beds and provides comprehensive pediatric specialties and subspecialties to patients aged 0–21. It is affiliated with the UC San Diego School of Medicine. Rady Children's is the only hospital in San Diego area dedicated exclusively to pediatric health care and the region's only Level I pediatric trauma center.

In 2023-24 and 2024–25, Rady Children's Hospital achieved Honor Roll status as a Top 10 children's hospital. They have consistently been ranked in all 10 pediatric specialties by U.S. News & World Report. The specialties include: Cancer, Cardiology & Heart Surgery, Diabetes & Endocrinology, Gastroenterology, Neonatology, Nephrology, Neurology & Neurosurgery, Orthopedics, Pulmonology, and Urology.

== History ==
Plans for the Hospital began in 1951 when the Board of the San Diego Society for Crippled Children initiated construction plans for a new children's hospital. In 1953, Children's Hospital Auxiliary was formed and, later that year, groundbreaking took place.

On August 19, 1954, the Children's Hospital of San Diego opened to receive its first 12 patients. Since then, nearly 2 million sick and injured children have been treated at the hospital.

In 1985, Dr. David Chadwick founded the Center for Child Protection at the Children's Hospital of San Diego where he was director until his retirement in 1997.

In 2001, the Children's Hospital of San Diego formed a partnership with the University of California-San Diego to unify pediatric patient care, research, education, and community service programs.

In 2006, Ernest and Evelyn Rady made a donation of $60 million to Children's Hospital of San Diego, and the hospital was renamed Rady Children's Hospital-San Diego in their honor. The Rady family followed up with a gift of $120 million in 2014 to support the hospital's Institute for Genomic Medicine, and a pledge of $200 million in 2019. Harry Rady is a member of the Rady Children's Hospital Board of Trustees and is on the Dean's advisory board at the Rady School of Management at UCSD.

On October 10, 2010, Rady Children's opened the Acute Care Pavilion, a LEED-Certified (green) building that is home to the new Peckham Center for Cancer and Blood Disorders, the Warren Family Surgical Center, and a Neonatal Intensive Care Unit that cares for the community's tiniest and most fragile babies.

=== Partnership with Children's Specialized Hospital ===
In 2019, Children's Specialized Hospital, New Jersey, announced a partnership with Rady Children's Hospital, San Diego, California. The partnership helps to establish the first inpatient children's chronic pain program in Southern California. The program helps to provide pain relief for children and adolescents without using opioids. The new unit is branded with CSH's branding and the unit follows CSH policies on pediatric chronic rehabilitation and pain relief in children and teens up to the age of 21.

=== Merger with Children's Health Orange County and CHOC Children's ===
In November 2023, Rady Children’s Hospital and Children's Hospital of Orange County (CHOC) announced their intent to merge, forming one of the largest pediatric healthcare networks in California.

According to representatives from both organizations, this partnership aims to enhance pediatric healthcare delivery by integrating specialized services, research initiatives, and advanced technologies under one unified system. The merger is expected to streamline clinical operations, expand community outreach, and improve access to comprehensive pediatric care for families across Southern California.

In January 2025, it was announced that the merger between the two institutions had been completed.

== Employees ==
Rady Children's Hospital San Diego has nearly 1,000 physicians and more than 1,500 nurses on staff, nearly 6,000 employees, 300 active volunteers, and more than 1,200 auxiliary staff.

== Fundraising ==
Rady Children's Hospital Foundation directs fundraising efforts on behalf of the hospital, and offers opportunities for volunteers. Its main volunteer group is Rady Children's Hospital Auxiliary (RCHA), whose members organize and promote many fundraising events or contribute their individual services more directly in support of the hospital and its patients.

Begun over a century ago to support "the children's home," RCHA formally became a supporting arm of Children's Hospital when the initial hospital was built on its current site in 1953. Recently the 103rd Anniversary Charity Ball to benefit Rady Children's, called Spectacular San Diego, was held at the renowned Hotel del Coronado. Without anything at all, the annual Charity Ball has contributed over $10 million to support various hospital departments and programs.

Most of RCHA's activities occur within its 21 auxiliary units located in various communities throughout the hospital's service area in San Diego, Imperial and Riverside counties. Many units sponsor fundraising events of their own, including a Garden Walk by Point Loma's Dana Unit, Sweet Charity luncheon by Fuerte Hills' Unit, and Stand Up for Rady Children's, sponsored by the Rancho Santa Fe Unit. Since 2007, the Carmel Valley Unit has raised approximately $4 million to support various areas of the Hospital such as Speech & Hearing, Emergency Care Center, Neonatal Intensive Care Center, Asthma and Immunology, Chadwick Center for Children and Autism Discovery Institute.

=== All American Classic event ===
Since 2003, the hospital has been the beneficiary of the proceeds from the annual Perfect Game All-American Classic, an all-star baseball game and banquet. At the banquet, the Aflac National High School Baseball Player of the Year is presented the Jackie Robinson Award. Since 2003, the Aflac All-American Baseball Classic has generated nearly $805,000 for charity.
