= Alfred McCormack =

20th-Century American attorney and official in military intelligence (1901–1956)

Colonel Alfred McCormack, CBE (1901–1956), was a trained attorney of Cravath, Swaine & Moore who during and after World War II served in the US Military Intelligence Service, where he proved crucial in developing military analysis of cryptographic intercepts in Operation Magic.

== Background ==
Alfred T. McCormack was born on January 13, 1901, in Brooklyn, New York. In 1921, he graduated Phi Beta Kappa from Princeton University and in 1925 received a law degree from Columbia University.

== Career ==
In 1926, McCormack clerked for Supreme Court Justice Harlan Fiske Stone. Later that year, he joined a Wall Street law firm of Cravath, de Gersdorff, Swaine and Wood (whose name became Cravath, Swaine & Moore in 1944), where he became a partner in 1935.

In January 1942, five weeks after the Japanese attack on Pearl Harbor, Secretary of War Henry Stimson tapped McCormack to head up a new intelligence branch whose central purpose was to collect, digest, and swiftly disseminate deciphered code messages from the enemy, principally Germany and Japan. Stimson was convinced that all of the necessary information to anticipate, and even prevent, the attack on Pearl Harbor had been in American hands, but that the military intelligence system had failed to analyze or use it properly.

This information was the work product of Operation Magic, the enemy message traffic decryption program. McCormack immediately put in place an entirely new system for interpreting and distributing intercepted communications to the departments that needed them.

According to author Bruce Lee:

The first so-called Magic Summaries that McCormack produces are rough. But they are far better than reading raw original texts without the benefit of expert opinion. By mid-March 1942, McCormack's new operation is churning out a daily Summary for the Chief of Staff that contains complex information written clearly in grammatical English. For the first time, these Summaries present Marshall, Stimson and others with a detailed daily briefing of world events as seen through the eyes of Tokyo and its representatives stationed around the world. Reading them carefully gives one a sense of viewing World War II through the eyes of the Foreign Minister of Japan. It is an eerie, awesome and frightening sensation.

In June 1942, McCormack received a commission as colonel in the US Military Intelligence Service, known as the Military Intelligence Corps as part of the US Department of War's general staff.

McCormack advocated that attorneys were ideal candidates to conduct cryptographic analysis, and he set about hiring many whom he knew. According to Henry Clausen, another investigator who worked closely with Stimson:

Within a couple of months [McCormack] completely revamped the army's intelligence system, and he had his own men, civilian lawyers from Wall street, percolating throughout G-2 (Intelligence). McCormack was top-notch.... What you needed were people of intellect and vision. Alfred could read the slightest scrawl on the wall and make sense out of it.

McCormack worked closely with British intelligence on procedure and in exchanges of personnel, formation, and intelligence. (As part of the 1943 BRUSA Agreement, McCormack, Colonel Telford Taylor of Military Intelligence, and Lieutenant Colonel William Friedman visited Bletchley Park in April 1943, where they worked with Commander Edward Travis (RN), head of the British communications intelligence (COMINT) facility, and shared their solution to the Japanese Purple machine.) On July 1, 1944, he became Director of Intelligence for the Military Intelligence Service.

McCormack was involved in The Pond.

McCormack opposed the use of Black. Among others, he suspected that the British were reading the dispatches in the American "Black" code, not the Germans. He concluded that was not the case, but considerable ill feeling had been aroused (Churchill had told Roosevelt in February 1942 that he had stopped British work on American diplomatic codes, a warning to tighten them up).

McCormack resigned on April 23, 1946, in a memo to Dean Acheson, then acting Secretary of State, with the following explanation:

The series of Departmental Orders issued yesterday, relating to the intelligence organization within the Department, provide for dismembering the Office of Research and Intelligence and transferring its functions to a group of separate research divisions under the Political Offices, and they contain other organizational provisions that I regard as unworkable and unsound. I had hoped that the compromise proposal worked out by Colonel Tyler Wood, which appeared to meet all points of substance raised by the Political Offices, would be found acceptable, and I was therefore disappointed to find that the orders as issued conformed almost exactly to the so-called "Russell Plan," proposed by the Assistant Secretary for Administration last December. ...While the plan adopted will give needed reinforcements to the Political Offices, and in that respect will be beneficial, it will make impossible the establishment of a real intelligence unit within the Department; that it will weaken the Department, vis-a-vis the military components of the National Intelligence Authority, who already have the advantage of a three to one representation in the Central Intelligence Group, as compared with that of the State Department; and that it will prevent the carrying out of the long-range plans for postwar intelligence which you and I had in mind when you asked me to come into the Department... Feeling as I do that the organization as now to be set up is unsound and not in the best interests of the Government, I cannot conscientiously present the case to the Senate, and I believe that the best interests of the Department and the Government will be served by my immediate resignation.

In its obituary, the New York Times later stated that McCormack had resigned in October 1946 "after a sharp difference in opinion over the organization of the department's intelligence functions." Henry Clausen's summary was: "Army bureaucracy got him in the end. Poor McCormack never got the thanks he deserved."

He returned to Cravath in 1946.

In January 1952, McCormack reported to the Secretary of War "to study certain aspects of military intelligence."

== Personal life and death ==
On May 31, 1930, McCormack married Winifred Byron Smith and had three sons, including publisher Win McCormack.

McCormack served as chair of the Board of Visitors for Columbia Law School. In his law practice, he "devoted much of his time to the affairs of the late Maj. Edwin H. Armstrong, prominent inventor in the radio field."

Alfred McCormack died age 55 on January 12, 1956, of cancer at Greenwich Hospital in Greenwich, Connecticut.

== Awards ==
- 1945: Distinguished Service Medal (United States)
- (date?): Order of the British Empire, Honorary Commander

== Legacy ==
Columbia Law School has a chair named the "Alfred McCormack Professor of Law" in his honor, whose recipients include Robert E. Scott and E. Allan Farnsworth. The Redding Land Trust includes a "Col. Alfred McCormack Preserve" near Danbury, Connecticut.

== See also ==
- Magic (cryptography)
- Military Intelligence Division (United States)
- Military Intelligence Corps (United States Army)
- The Pond (intelligence organization)
- 1943 BRUSA Agreement

== External sources ==
- Redding Land Trust - Col. Alfred McCormack Preserve
- Letter From the Secretary of State’s Special Assistant for Research and Intelligence (McCormack) to the President’s Chief of Staff (Leahy) (October 31, 1945)
- 19 June 1950: To: Alfred McCormack. From: Roy W. Howard
