= Girls Burn Brighter =

2018 novel by Shobha Rao

- Author: Shobha Rao
- Published: 6 March 2018
- Publisher: Flatiron Books (Macmillan Publishers)
- Publication place: United States; India
- Pages: 309
- ISBN: 9781250074256

Girls Burn Brighter is a 2018 novel by Indian-American writer Shobha Rao. It was published on 6 March 2018 by Flatiron Books (a subdivision of Macmillan Publishers), and is Rao's debut novel. It tells the story of two girls, Poornima and Savitha, from the village of Indravelli in Telangana, India.

== Writing ==
Rao, who was born in Kanpur to a family from the weaver caste of an Andhra town called Mangalagiri, has said, "I grew up observing the lives of women around me, this subset who had poor education, poor health their lives were very devalued. I've always been interested in the specific vulnerabilities of some women, especially in times of conflict." She stated that the novel was written over the course of two months in the Badlands of South Dakota, without access to television, internet or radio. She also revealed that she initially wrote the book as a single narrative, before editing it to jump between the two girls' points of view. In another interview, she said that the violence in the book was partly based on the stories of abuse victims she had heard during her years as a legal advocate in the field of domestic violence.

== Plot ==
Poornima is a girl born into a poor family of weavers in the Indian village of Indravelli in Telangana. Her mother dies of cancer when she is 16. Soon after, Poornima's father hires a local girl, 17-year-old Savitha, to help with the looms. Poornima and Savitha strike up a friendship. One night as Savitha is working at Poornima's house, Poornima's father rapes her. As punishment, the village elders rule that he must marry her. Savitha runs away from the village but falls into the hands of a pimp, called Guru, who forces her into prostitution.

Meanwhile, Poornima has an arranged marriage to an accountant in the nearby village. Her father can only pay a portion of the dowry at the time of marriage but promises to pay the remaining within a year. A year passes but the dowry remains unpaid. Enraged, Poornima's husband and mother-in-law douse her in hot oil, leaving her face permanently disfigured. Poornima flees and eventually finds her way to Guru after one of his scouts indicates he knew Savitha. Due to her disfigurement, she is saved from prostitution and instead hired to keep the ring's accounting books, a skill she picked up during her marriage.

Over time, Poornima comes to learn that Savitha belonged to the ring and has been sent to Seattle, USA, supposedly as domestic help. Her arm was amputated so that she could obtain the necessary medical visa to enter the US. Determined to be reunited with her, Poornima convinces Guru to use her as a “shepherd” – a middleman to deliver girls from the pimp to foreign clients. Guru eventually agrees and she is assigned to shepherd a girl to Seattle.

Upon reaching Seattle, Poornima learns that Savitha has escaped from her owner. With the help of the owner's son, who has feelings for Savitha, Poornima sets out to find her. The book ends with Savitha and Poornima on either side of a bathroom door, neither having seen the other one yet.

== Reception ==
The book received mostly positive reviews from critics. The Free Press Journal praised the book's "psychological streak, nay blitzkrieg, which shines and blazes through their association and interminable obstacles they were subject to" but warned the book was "a tad boring for those who look for a flux of plots in a novel." San Francisco Chronicle likened it to "a Thomas Hardy novel on steroids — if not leavened with subtle moments of humanity and joy, smaller emotions conveyed with tremendous lyricism". The Guardian called it "a timely and harrowing portrayal of human trafficking, cultural misogyny and the battles still fought every day by millions of women worldwide" but also noted that "the relentlessness of the abuse [means] that by the time we reach the novel’s final act of sexual brutality, there is a feeling of weary acceptance – by both Savitha and the reader – that this is just how life is". The New York Times echoed this sentiment, and also called the portrayal of India in the book as "hazardous in the current global moment [...] If all Indians really were so relentlessly cruel as the characters in Rao’s novel, you couldn’t blame someone for not wanting them living next door".
