= Margaret Lee Chadwick =

American nonfiction author (1893–1984)

- Born: Margaret Lee; April 26, 1893; Spanish Fork, Utah, U.S.
- Died: May 2, 1984 (aged 91); Palos Verdes Peninsula, California, U.S.
- Education: Wooster College; Stanford University
- Occupation: Educator
- Years active: 1935–1963
- Known for: Chadwick School
- Spouse: Joseph Chadwick (m. 1921; died 1970)
- Children: 3

Margaret Lee Chadwick (née Lee; April 26, 1893 – May 2, 1984) was a nonfiction writer and founder and headmistress of the K-12 Chadwick School, located on the Palos Verdes Peninsula in Los Angeles County, California, United States.

== Early life and education ==
Chadwick, born in Spanish Fork, Utah, was the daughter of Anna Myrtilla (Wray) and Theodore Lee, a Utah Presbyterian minister, and one of eight children. In 1910, she enrolled at Wooster College in Ohio, and then transferred to Stanford University on a scholarship.

After college graduation, Chadwick accepted a teaching position in the now defunct city of Metropolis, near Elko, Nevada. After a year, she traveled to China, where her brother Paul Lee was stationed. He introduced her to Naval Officer Joseph Chadwick, who was also stationed there. The couple married in Shanghai in 1921 and relocated to California. They had three children, Theodora, also a graduate of Stanford, Joseph Jr., who also joined the Navy, and David, a pediatrician engaged in research and lecturing and who joined the Navy as well, in its V-12 Navy College Training Program.

== School founder ==
One of her husband's final tours was to San Pedro, California. The couple enrolled their children in local schools, which both parents found unsatisfactory. So, in 1935, Chadwick founded the open-air home school on the front porch of her home on Le Grande Terrace in San Pedro with four students, two of them her own sons. The other two were Mark and Jean Roessler, whose parents Fred and Edna, early residents on the Palos Verdes Peninsula. Through deeding more than 33 acres from developer Frank A. Vanderlip for a permanent site and the initial buildings paid for by the Robert Roessler family, in 1939, the school moved to a hilltop in Palos Verdes with 75 day and boarding students, and was the first high school on the Palos Verdes Peninsula. Her husband, Lt. Commander Joseph Chadwick, helped run the school.

In 1963, the Chadwicks retired. At the same time, the Roessler-Chadwick Foundation was formed and trustees were named. Margaret Chadwick wrote in her 1978 book A Dipperful of Humanity, her emphasis on the school was a "dedication to enrolling a student body, that reflects a broad economic, cultural and ethnic mix," mirroring the real world and stressing the importance of attracting a student body that represented "a dipperful of humanity."

In October 2018, her youngest son, David Chadwick, 13 months before his 2020 death, was given the 2019 Distinguished Alumnus Award from Chadwick School, from which he graduated in 1942.

=== Chadwick-Ansel Adams connection ===
Thirteen pictures by Ansel Adams, which were on display during a January 2011 exhibition at the Palos Verdes Library, came about in 1941 after Chadwick hired Adams to do a three-day photo shoot for her school's fifth-anniversary promotional catalog. In 1942, Adams returned to the campus to shoot a tennis exhibition featuring professional tennis star Jack Kramer. Negatives for some of those prints are in the official Adams archive at the University of Arizona's Center for Creative Photography.

Adams also took a portrait of Chadwick and her husband, in uniform after he was called back to duty during World War II. The photo once decorated the archives office in the school's library. The couple originally met Adams during an annual ski trip to Yosemite on which Commander Chadwick would take the then small student body.

Found in Chadwick's records upon her death was a letter Adams sent to the Chadwicks in 1974. The Chadwicks, he wrote, "infused the entire organization with a kind of creative drive (and evoked a marvelous human quality) ... it was an unforgettable experience, and I only wish I had done more and better work for the school." Also in Chadwick's records were photographic Christmas cards that Adams and his wife Virginia sent the Chadwicks each year.

== Books ==
Chadwick wrote three nonfiction books. The first, Looking at the Sunset Upside Down: The Autobiography of Margaret Lee Chadwick, was released in 1976 by Omega Books.

In 1978, Anchor Press released A Dipperful of Humanity: The Chadwick Adventure in Education about the Chadwick School.

Her third book, The Lee Family of Spanish Fork, Utah, was released in paperback by Anchor Press in 1979. It outlined Chadwick's Utah heritage.

== Personal life ==
Her husband died at age 77 on August 13, 1970. Chadwick, called "Aunt Maggie" by her students, died at 91 on May 2, 1984. She was the grandmother of actress and singer Kate Morgan Chadwick. She was portrayed by Priscilla Pointer in 1981 film Mommie Dearest.
