= David Chadwick (physician) =

American clinical and research pediatrician (1926–2020)

David L. Chadwick
- Born: David Lee Chadwick; September 12, 1926
- Died: January 19, 2020 (aged 93); La Mesa, California, U.S.
- Citizenship: U.S.
- Education: University of California, Berkeley; University of California, San Francisco
- Known for: Pioneer in child-abuse cases
- Children: Kate Morgan Chadwick; Ted Chadwick
- Medical career
- Field: Pediatrics
- Institutions: Children's Hospital Los Angeles; Rady Children's Hospital
- Sub-specialties: Clinical research
- Research: Pediatrics/child abuse
- Awards: Sister Elizabeth Kenny Foundation scholarship American Medical Association Scientific Achievement Award; C. Anderson Aldrich Award; American Professional Society's Lifetime Achievement Award; Distinguished Scholar Award; Distinguished Alumnus Award

David L. Chadwick (September 12, 1926 – January 19, 2020) was an American clinical and research pediatrician, author, founder of the Chadwick Center for Children and Autism Discovery Institute in San Diego, and director emeritus at Rady Children's Hospital. He became an international pioneer in identifying, treating and preventing child abuse and a recognized expert in the field who started a movement.

== Early life and education ==
Chadwick grew up the youngest of three siblings in San Pedro, California, and attended the private Chadwick School founded by his parents, headmistress Margaret Lee Chadwick and Comdr. Joseph Chadwick, a career Naval officer. Chadwick attended the University of California, Berkeley, and after completing the bachelor's degree course work in two years, he enrolled in the V-12 Navy College Training Program that trained medical personnel. At the end of his service, he used the G.I. bill to complete his medical education to become a doctor.

== Career ==
Chadwick began his career in 1949 working as a medical student intern under Dr. Henry Kempe, an early leader in identifying and treating child abuse, at the University of California-San Francisco. The following year, while at UCSF's Department of Pediatrics in the Medical School, Chadwick was awarded a five-year, $35,000 scholarship from the Sister Elizabeth Kenny Foundation for a research program seeking the causes of post-infection encephalitis.

He then joined Children's Hospital Los Angeles in 1958 as a faculty pediatrician after Helen Boardman, a social worker who once served on the founding board of Parents Anonymous recruited him to look at child abuse. Chadwick also worked as a pediatrician, as well as a researcher and lecturer, at the University of Southern California Medical School. He contributed to the 1962 original model for the Child Abuse Reporting Law, which became one of the nation's first mandatory abuse-reporting laws.

Chadwick left Los Angeles in 1968 to become the first employed pediatrician at San Diego Children's Hospital, rising as its first chief medical officer before leaving hospital administration to focus on founding its Center for Child Protection.

He wrote an editorial in 1972 for the San Diego County Medical Journal suggesting that Children's Hospital University of California-San Diego, Mercy Hospital, Kaiser Permanente, and the United States Navy combine their resources into a single world-class children's hospital. By 1985, Chadwick had founded the Center for Child Protection at Rady Children's Hospital in San Diego.

Chadwick spoke before the U.S. Congress in September 1985 about the Child Health Incentive Reform Plan, on behalf of the Western Association of Children's Hospitals. He also co-founded in 1986 the American Professional Society on the Abuse of Children, serving as its second president.

He spoke at a California State Senate task force in 1989 about Senate Resolution 7, for a statewide implementation of a Family Relations Division, which would have coequal status with criminal and civil divisions.

He was a researcher on shaken baby syndrome in the 1990s and a member of the American Academy of Pediatrics's child abuse and neglect committee. He also served as director of the Center for Child Protection at what is now Rady Children's Hospital-San Diego.

He served as chair of the American Medical Association's National Advisory Council on Family Violence. After his retirement from San Diego Children's Hospital in 1997, he worked half-time as a research professor of pediatrics at the University of Utah's department of pediatrics and at the Primary Children's Center for Safe and Healthy Families in Salt Lake City.

After leaving his positions in Salt Lake City, Chadwick had a stroke that left him with a hemiparesis. He learned voice transcription and authored the Child Abuse Doctors. He also developed the Cooperative Scientific Knowledge Exchange (CSKE), whose mission is to develop a system for dissemination of scientific knowledge about violence and abuse at the lowest cost.

=== Chadwick Center ===
The Rady's Center for Child Protection in 2004 was renamed after Chadwick, its founder, as the Chadwick Center for Children and Families.

In retirement, Chadwick continued as director emeritus at the Chadwick Center, and his work and co-writing continued to appear in periodicals and magazines, including the European Journal of Epilepsy in 2016.

The American Professional Society on the Abuse of Children, in its online tribute, called Chadwick a "life-long rebel and innovator who made the world a better place through his thinking, sharing, and action."

The Chadwick Center was the beneficiary, for the first time, of the 114th Anniversary Charity Ball at the Hotel del Coronado in February 2023, with a $1 million donation made in advance by the Manchester Family Foundation. The Ball had previously benefited Rady Children's Hospital.

== Awards and scholarships ==
In 1950, Chadwick was awarded the Sister Elizabeth Kenny Foundation scholarship for research.

In 2002, he received the C. Anderson Aldrich Award for "outstanding service to maltreated children."

In 2010, the American Medical Association presented him the Scientific Achievement Award for his pioneering work in child abuse treatment and prevention.

In 2016, Chadwick received a Lifetime Achievement Award from the American Professional Society on the Abuse of Children.

In 2017, he was a recipient of the Distinguished Scholar Award by the Academy on Violence and Abuse.

In October 2018, Chadwick was given the 2019 Distinguished Alumnus Award from Chadwick School, from which he graduated in 1942.

== Books ==
- Chadwick's Child Maltreatment, Volumes 1, 2 and 3 (978-1936590285), released in 2014 by STM Learning.
- The Child Abuse Doctors (978-1878060693) released in 2011 by STM Learning.
- Color Atlas of Child Sexual Abuse (978-0815116059) released in 1989 by Year Book Medical Publishers.
- Child Abuse Pocket Atlas Series, Volumes 1-4 (978-1936590612), by David L. Chadwick with Randell Alexander, Angelo Giardino, Debra Esernio-Jenssen and Jonathan Thackeray, STM Learning, 2016.

== Personal life ==
Chadwick and his second wife, Michele West Chadwick, had two adult children, Teddy Chadwick and Kate Morgan Chadwick. With his first wife, Lois Bartholomew, Chadwick had four adult children, Joseph, Cathleen, James, and David (Bart). Chadwick died on January 19, 2020, in his La Mesa, California home with his wife Michele and his children by his side. He was remembered as "a visionary and an innovator."
