= Greg Hrbek =

American novelist

- Occupations: Author, writer
- Children: 2
- Writing career
- Notable works: Not on Fire, But Burning

Greg Hrbek is an American fiction author and educator.

== Early years ==
Hrbek graduated from Kent School in Kent, Connecticut in 1986.

== Teaching ==
After earning a Bachelor of Arts from Vassar College in 1990, Hrbek taught kindergarten for three years in San Francisco and New York City, before studying for a Master of Fine Arts degree in English at the Iowa Writers' Workshop, which he completed in 1995. The University of Iowa awarded him an Iowa Arts Fellowship, and he won a James A. Michener Fellowship in 1995, which allowed him to write in California for a year, before returning to Vassar to teach half time in the English Department.

From 1999 to 2000, Hrbek taught fiction writing full-time at Butler University, then was awarded the year 2000 Alfred Hodder Fellowship from Princeton University, where he lived as fiction writer in residence. Since 2001, Hrbek has been teaching fiction writing courses as Writer-in-Residence at Skidmore College in Saratoga Springs, New York, where he lives with his wife, son and daughter.

== Writing ==
In 1996, at the age of 27, Hrbek won the James Jones First Novel Award for his first novel in progress, The Hindenburg Crashes Nightly, a complex story of obsessive, lifelong love. He had worked on this book for two years at the Iowa Writers' Workshop, and in California, and at Vassar while teaching. It was published in 1999 by Bard/Avon (ISBN 978-0380977413), and was widely reviewed, favorably by Publishers Weekly and Atlanta Journal-Constitution, mixed by The New York Times and Rocky Mountain News.

Since 1999, Hrbek has written short fiction, with stories appearing in Harper's Magazine, Salmagundi, Idaho Review, Conjunctions, and Black Warrior Review. His short story "Green World" (Harper's), was a finalist for the 1999 National Magazine Award in Fiction. "Bereavement" was a finalist for the 2007 Robert Olen Butler Prize, while "The Cliffs at Marpi" was a finalist for the 2006 Bridport Prize, each appearing in the respective anthologies. "Sagittarius" was a selection for The Best American Short Stories 2009. A collection of these short stories, Destroy All Monsters, was published by Bison Books in 2011, ISBN 978-0-8032-3644-8. It won the 2010 Prairie Schooner Book Prize in Fiction.

== Bibliography ==
- The Hindenburg Crashes Nightly (1996)
- Destroy All Monsters, and Other Stories (2011)
- Not on Fire, but Burning (2015)
