= Win McCormack =

American publisher and editor

- Born: Winthrop Laflin McCormack; 1944 or 1945 (age 81–82)
- Education: Harvard University (BA); University of Oregon (MFA)
- Relatives: Alfred McCormack (father)
- Website: Official website

Winthrop Laflin "Win" McCormack (born 1944/1945) is an American banking heir, political activist, publisher, and editor from Oregon.

He is editor-in-chief of Tin House magazine and Tin House Books, the former publisher of Oregon Magazine, founder and treasurer of MediAmerica, Inc., and a co-founder of Mother Jones magazine. He serves on the board of directors of the journal New Perspectives Quarterly. His political and social writings have appeared in Oregon Humanities, Tin House, The Nation, The Oregonian, and Oregon Magazine. McCormack's investigative coverage of the Rajneeshee movement was awarded a William Allen White Commendation from the University of Kansas and the City and Regional Magazine Association.

As a political activist, McCormack served as Chair of the Oregon Steering Committee for Gary Hart's 1984 presidential campaign. He was chair of the Democratic Party of Oregon's President's Council and a member of the Obama for President Oregon Finance Committee. Additionally, McCormack sits on the Board of Overseers for Emerson College, and is a co-founder of the Los Angeles–based Liberty Hill Foundation.

In February 2016, McCormack purchased The New Republic magazine from Chris Hughes.

== Early life and family ==
McCormack is the son of attorney Alfred McCormack and Winifred Byron Smith McCormack.

Reed Magazine reports that, after his mother’s death, he inherited money that helped him acquire Oregon Times magazine. He has been described as “an heir to a midwestern banking fortune.” On his mother’s side, a published genealogy identifies Winifred Byron Smith as the child of Walter Byron Smith. A contemporary profile of Walter Byron Smith states that he was the second son of Byron Laflin Smith, who founded The Northern Trust Company in 1889.

== Education ==
He received an A.B. from Harvard College and an MFA from the University of Oregon.

== Books ==
- 2008 You Don't Know Me: A Citizen's Guide to Republican Family Values. Portland, Oregon: Tin House Books. ISBN 978-1-135-89772-7.
- 2010 The Rajneesh Chronicles. Portland, Oregon: Tin House Books. ISBN 978-0-9825691-9-1.
