= Jessica Gottlieb =

American blogger and speaker (born 1970)

Jessica Wilzig Gottlieb (née Wilzig, born March 28, 1970) is an American blogger and speaker who resides in Los Angeles, California. She writes JessicaGottlieb.com which focuses on being a mom, also known as “Mommy Blogging”. Gottlieb, born in Manhattan Beach, California, attended Chadwick School, and graduated with a BS from Colorado State University Pueblo and with an MA Ed from Pepperdine University. Currently, she resides in Los Angeles with her husband, a television executive, her daughter, and son.

== Online career ==
Gottlieb initiated her online career on eBay and was recognized as a successful eBay retailer, being interviewed for the book The eBay Success Chronicles by Angela Adams. She started blogging for Celsias.com in 2007, GreenOptions.com, National Lampoon and anonymously on Pissed Off Housewife, a blog that focused on daily life as a mother in Los Angeles, but coincided with the death of her best friend from AIDS. After the passing of her friend, Gottlieb left Pissed Off Housewife in 2007, creating JessicaGottlieb.com. The eponymously named site discusses daily life that relates to motherhood.

Gottlieb's expertise in the area of “Mommy Blogging” has been utilized on the Dr. Phil Show, where Gottlieb has been a guest multiple times. She has also worked with a number of large companies such as HP, Kenmore, Tupperware and many more. In 2008 and 2009, Nielsen awarded Gottlieb the title of Power Mom. In 2009 and 2010, she was listed by Babble.com as a Top 50 Mom Blog. Also in 2010, Forbes listed Gottlieb as one of the most influential women on Twitter.

Currently, Gottlieb is a participant in the video vlog “Momversation”, which focuses on issues that affect moms and gives different perspectives of other mom bloggers, including Heather Armstrong, of the blog Dooce. Gottlieb traveled with Oprah Winfrey to help promote her fledgling network in 2012. As a frequent commentator on CNN and HLN Gottlieb was on The Daily Show after Dr Keith Ablow declared he was not a pedophile.
