= Leopoldine Core =

American poet and short story writer

- Born: 1984 or 1985 (age 41–42); Manhattan, New York, U.S.
- Education: Hunter College
- Occupations: Poet; short story writer
- Writing career
- Notable awards: Whiting Award in Fiction (2015)

Leopoldine Core (born 1984/1985) is an American poet and short story writer. She has published a poetry collection, Veronica Bench (2015), and a short story collection, When Watched (2016). She is a winner of the Whiting Award in Fiction, as well as a finalist for the Lambda Literary Award for Bisexual Fiction and the PEN/Hemingway Award for Debut Novel.

== Biography ==
Core was born in the East Village, Manhattan, and raised in a railroad apartment nearby Tompkins Square Park. She graduated from Hunter College, and she planned to be a therapist afterwards before finding herself, as she recalled, "too emotional to have that job". She subsequently decided to go into writing. She was a 2012 Center for Fiction Emerging Writers Fellow and a 2012 Fine Arts Work Center Fellow.

In 2015, Core published her debut book-length poetry collection Veronica Bench. That same year, she won a Whiting Award in Fiction.

In 2016, Core published her first short story collection, When Watched; the book's nineteen stories focus on "a similar cast of downtown types" similar to Core's own artist friends from her Manhattan upbringing. Steph Eckhardt of W said that "if 'write what you know' is creative writing’s biggest axiom, Core has become its biggest disciple", while Alexandra Kleeman of The New York Times subsequently drew comparisons with Jane Bowles, William S. Burroughs, and Mary Gaitskill.

Core's story "Hog for Sorrow" was featured in The Best American Short Stories 2017. In 2017, she was honored as one of the National Book Foundation's 5 Under 35. She was a finalist for the 2017 PEN/Hemingway Award for Debut Novel and the 2017 Lambda Literary Award for Bisexual Fiction.

Core cites Mark Gonzales' Non Stop Poetry, Nella Larsen's Passing, and Jenny Zhang's Hags as her inspirations.

Core is dyslexic. She was once in a relationship with poet Eileen Myles.

== Bibliography ==
- Veronica Bench (2015)
- When Watched (2016)
