= Suffolk University Law Review =

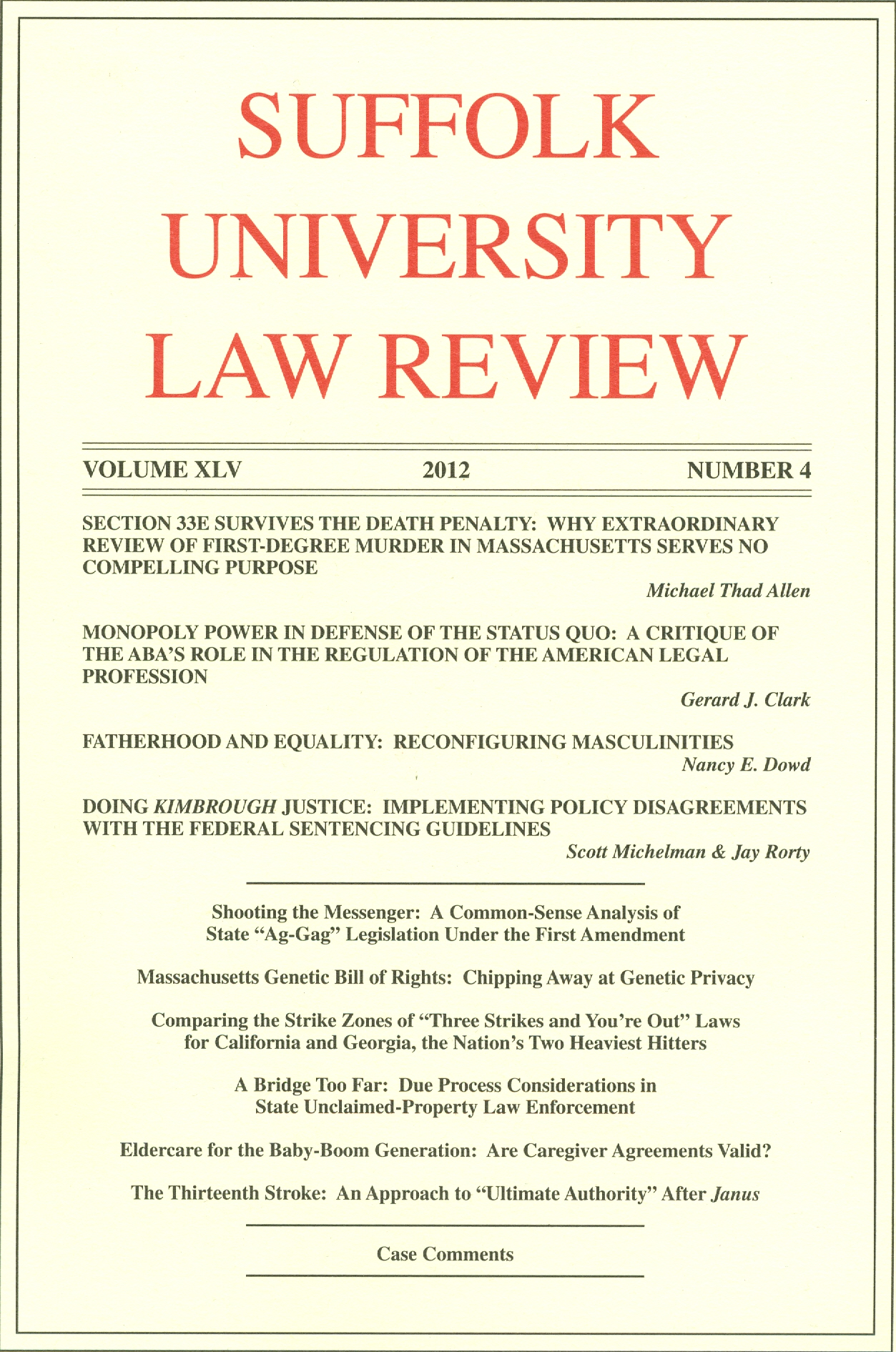
A representative volume of the Suffolk University Law Review

The Suffolk University Law Review is a law review published at Suffolk University Law School in Boston, Massachusetts by an independent student group.

== Overview ==
The law review's membership consists entirely of second and third year law students at Suffolk University Law School. These students are selected from an annual writing competition, and eligibility to compete is based on exceptional first-year grades. Suffolk University Law Review was established in 1967 and publishes all of its articles in both print form and online.

== Donahue Lecture Series ==
The Suffolk University Law Review sponsors the Donahue Lecture Series, which annually attracts lecturers from among the nation's top legal scholars and jurists. Each Donahue Lecturer is an exceptionally prominent legal scholar who delivers a lecture at Suffolk University Law School that forms the basis for a Lead Article to be published in the Law Review shortly thereafter.

The Law Review instituted this lecture series in 1980 to commemorate the Honorable Frank J. Donahue, former faculty member, trustee, and treasurer of Suffolk University. Judge Donahue graduated from Suffolk University Law School in 1921, and served as an Associate Justice of the Superior Court of Massachusetts for forty-two years—the longest term in that court's history. As Chairman of the Law School Committee of the Board of Trustees, Judge Donahue played an active role in the expansion of the faculty, library, and other facilities at the law school. For many years, he served as president of the Law School Alumni Association, and in that capacity personally raised thousands of dollars of scholarship funds to promote, encourage, and reward the pursuit of scholastic excellence.

Over the years, the Donahue Lecture Series has featured a number of outstanding legal scholars and jurists, including: Chief Justice William Rehnquist, Associate Justices Antonin Scalia, Stephen Breyer, and Sonia Sotomayor, Judge Richard Posner, former United States Attorney General Edwin Meese, and consumer protection activist Ralph Nader.

The Following is a Representative, but Currently Incomplete List of Prior Donahue Lecturers

Speaker	Title
Bernard Schwartz	Webb Professor of Law, New York University Law School
Peter L. Strauss	Professor of Law, Columbia University School of Law
A. Leon Higginbotham, Jr.	United States Court of Appeals for the Third Circuit
Philip B. Kurland	William R. Kenan, Jr., Distinguished Service Professor, University of Chicago Law School
Theodore J. St. Antoine	James E. and Sarah A. Degan Professor of Law, University of Michigan Law School
G. Edward White	Professor of Law, University of Virginia School of Law
Grant Gilmore	Professor of Law, Vermont Law School
Lawrence M. Friedman	Marion Rice Kirkwood Professor of Law, Stanford Law School
Antonin Scalia	Associate Justice of the United States Supreme Court
John E. Nowak	Professor of Law, University of Illinois School of Law
Edward D. Re	Chief Judge of the United States Court of International Trade
Derrick A. Bell, Jr.	Dean, University of Oregon School of Law
Paul R. Verkuil	Dean of the Law School, Tulane University School of Law
Raoel Berger	Charles Warren Senior Fellow, Harvard University Law School
Jerold S. Auerbach	Professor and Chairman of the History Department, Wellesley College
Dorothy W. Nelson	United States Court of Appeals for the Ninth Circuit
Jerome A. Barron	Dean of the George Washington University National Law Center
Richard A. Posner	United States Court of Appeals for the Seventh Circuit
William H. Rehnquist	Associate Justice of the United States Supreme Court, later Chief Justice of the Supreme Court
Ronald D. Rotunda	Professor of Law, University of Illinois
Ralph Nader	Lawyer and Consumer Protection Activist
Irving Younger	Marvin J. Sonosky Professor of Law, University of Minnesota Law School
Constance Baker Motley	United States District Court for the Southern District of New York
L. Kinvin Wroth	Dean of the University of Maine School of Law
Lino A. Graglia	Rex G. Baker and Edna Heflin Baker Professor of Constitutional Law, University of Texas School of Law
Charles E. Rice	Professor of Law, University of Notre Dame Law School
Jules B. Gerard	Professor of Law, Washington University School of Law
Bernard H. Siegan	Distinguished Professor of Law, University of San Diego School of Law
Edwin Meese III	Former United States Attorney General
Sarah Weddington	Lawyer and Lecturer, University of Texas and Texas Women's University
Stephen Breyer	United States Court of Appeals for the First Circuit, now Associate Justice of the United States Supreme Court
Stanley Sporkin	United States District Judge for the District of Columbia
Louis Fisher	Senior Specialist in Separation of Powers Congressional Research Service of the Library of Congress
Jack Greenberg	Dean of Columbia University
Patricia McGowan Wald	United States Court of Appeals for the District of Columbia
Cass R. Sunstein	Karl N. Llewellyn Professor of Jurisprudence, University of Chicago Law School
Owen M. Fiss	Alexander M. Bickel Professor of Public Law, Yale University Law School
Rodney A. Smolla	Arthur B. Hanson Professor of Law and Director, Institute of Bill of Rights Law, College of William and Mary, Marshall-Whythe School of Law
Douglas J. Whaley	James W. Shocknessy Professor of Law, Ohio State University College of Law
Shirley S. Abrahamson	Justice, Wisconsin Supreme Court
A.E. Dick Howard	White Burkett Miller Professor of Law and Public Affairs, University of Virginia
E. Allan Farnsworth	Alfred McCormack Professor of Law, Columbia University
Michael J. Perry	Howard J. Trienens Professor of Law, Northwestern University Law School
A. Kim Cambell	Former Canadian Prime Minister
George P. Fletcher	Cardozo Professor of Jurisprudence, Columbia University School of Law
Emma Coleman Jordan	Professor of Law, Georgetown University Law Center
Paul B. Stephan, III	Percy Brown, Jr. Professor of Law and the Hunton & Williams, Research Professor, University of Virginia
Bruce M. Selya	United States Court of Appeals for the First Circuit
Sonia Sotomayor	United States District Court for the Southern District of New York, now Associate Justice of the United States Supreme Court
Daniel R. Coquillette	Former Dean and Professor of Law, Boston College Law School
Akhil Reed Amar	Southmayd Professor of Law, Yale Law School
Charles Fried	Associate Justice for the Massachusetts Supreme Judicial Court
Patti B. Saris	United States District Judge for the United States District Court for the District of Massachusetts
Richard J. Leon	Partner, Baker & Hostetler, now District Judge, United States District Court for the District of Columbia
Alex Kozinski	United States Court of Appeals for the Ninth Circuit
Edward D. Re	Chief Judge Emeritus for the United States Court of International Trade and Distinguished Professor of Law, St. John's University School of Law
Nancy Gertner	United States District Court for the District of Massachusetts
Loren A. Smith	Chief Judge of the United States Court of Claims
Erwin Chemerinsky	Sydney M. Irmas Professor of Law and Political Science, University of Southern California Law Center
Joyce London Alexander	United States District Court for the District of Massachusetts
Dean Alice Gresham Bullock	Dean and Professor, Howard University School of Law
Sandra L. Lynch	United States Court of Appeals for the First Circuit
Charles H. Whitebread	George T. Pfleger Professor of Law, The Law School, University of Southern California
Gerald E. Rosen	United States District Court for the Eastern District of Michigan
Laurie L. Levinson	Professor of Law, William M. Rains Fellow, Loyola Law School
Professor David D. Cole	Professor of Law, Georgetown University Law Center

Last Update: February 22, 2013
