= Black (code) =

Secret code used by US military attachés in early WWII

The Black Code (more formally, Military Intelligence Code No. 11) was a secret code used by US military attachés in the early period of World War II. The nickname derived from the color of the superencipherment tables/codebook binding. The code was compromised by Axis intelligence, the information leak costing a great many British lives.

== Theft of the Black Code ==
Unknown to the U.S. government, details of the Black code were stolen from the U.S. embassy in Italy by Italian spies in September 1941. Embassy worker Loris Gherardi took copies of the embassy keys. These were passed on to the Italian Military Intelligence Service, who were able to break in, copy, and replace the documents.

The Italians did not pass on the full code to the Chiffrierabteilung, their German counterparts, only providing limited information such as decoded American messages. However, the limited information still assisted the Germans in their own independent efforts and they too were able to crack the Black Code. Beginning in mid-December 1941 Germany was able to read the reports of Bonner Fellers, U.S. military attaché in Cairo.

Fellers' radiograms provided detailed information about troop movements and equipment to the Axis. The information was extensive and timely to the Axis powers. Information from Fellers' messages alerted the Axis to British convoy operations in the Mediterranean Sea, including efforts to resupply the garrison of Malta. Beginning in January 1942 information about the numbers and condition of British forces was provided to General Erwin Rommel, the German commander in Africa. He could thus plan his operations with reliable knowledge about the opposing forces. The Germans referred to Fellers as "die gute Quelle" (the good source). Rommel referred to him as "the little fellow".

In June 1942 the British informed Washington that the "Cairo Code" was compromised and the U.S. Army Signals Intelligence Service promptly sent a SIGABA machine to Cairo. The leak ended on June 29, when Fellers switched to the new U.S. code system. But some, like Colonel Alfred McCormack, were unconvinced and suspected that the British were reading the dispatches in the American "Black" code, not the Germans. McCormack finally concluded that was not the case, but considerable ill feeling had been aroused (Churchill had told Roosevelt in February 1942 that he had stopped British work on American diplomatic codes, a warning to tighten them up). Meanwhile, the Allies benefited from reports by Japanese attachés in Germany and by Ambassador Hiroshi Ōshima.
