= Treasure State (short story) =

Short story by Smith Henderson

- Short story by Smith Henderson
- The cover of Tin House vol. 16, #4, where "Treasure State" first appeared
- Country: United States
- Language: English

Publication
- Published in: Tin House
- Publication date: 2015

"Treasure State" is a short story by American author Smith Henderson, originally published in Tin House in 2015, and then in the 2016 edition of The Best American Short Stories. Anthology editor Junot Díaz called “Treasure State” a “bruising portrait of brotherly rage”.

== Plot ==
After learning that their father is getting out of prison, two brothers leave home and try to drive from Indiana to Montana, financing their trip by robbing the houses of the dead, during funerals. When they're nearly caught in the act after one funeral party arrives home early, the younger brother (Daniel) befriends the deceased's niece and tries to take her with them, a plan that the older brother immediately stops.

At another town, Daniel meets a second young woman and insists his older brother allow her to join them. The girl discovers that the older brother is not driving west, but in a loop.

In the next town, the older brother hides under a bed for hours after he's nearly caught breaking into the home of a young widow. After escaping, he has Daniel and the young woman drop him off at their dying father's house, and realizes his father is so ill he's not worth killing.

== Background ==
Henderson stated that the story was born not from laborious planning but from a singular moment of inspiration:

For some reason, “Treasure State” didn’t require much to get into shape. I’d read an article about some clever rural burglars, and the whole story just fell out of my head—thunk!—like an ingot onto the desk.
