= American Nerd =

Book by Benjamin Nugent

American Nerd: The Story of My People
- Author: Benjamin Nugent
- Language: English
- Publisher: Scribner
- Publication date: May 13, 2008
- Publication place: United States
- Media type: Print (Hardback & Paperback)
- Pages: 240 pages (Hardcover)
- ISBN: 978-0-7432-8801-9

American Nerd: The Story of My People is a book by Benjamin Nugent. The book discusses the history and origin of the term nerd, as well as what the term means in today's age. Some of the important topics discussed include the racial differences for the term nerd, such as how race played into Urkel, a nerdy character played by Jaleel White on the TV series Family Matters.

== Appearances ==
The book and the author were featured on Last Call with Carson Daly as well as The Sound of Young America on NPR.
