= Harriet Fasenfest =

American writer, urban gardener and food preservation educator

Harriet Fasenfest (born 1953) is an American writer, urban gardener, and food preservation educator in Portland, Oregon. A former owner/operator of several restaurants and cafes, she uses the term "householding" when referring to the practice of home food growing, canning and storage. She published her first book, A Householder's Guide to the Universe, in 2010.

== Biography ==
Fasenfest was born and raised in Bronx, New York. She moved to the Pacific Northwest in 1978 where she owned and operated the Bertie Lou's and Harriet's Eat Now cafes. In 1990 she traveled the country, married and moved back to California. In 1992 she moved to Georgia where she began working with Habitat for Humanity International. In 1997 Fasenfest returned to Portland to work as director of the Performance Salon Series at North Portland's North Star Ballroom, an events arena which combined art and performance with social activism. In 2000 she opened her most recent cafe, Groundswell.

In 2004 she transformed her backyard in Northern Portland into a producing garden. She grows produce for home canning and storing, and teaches classes in food preservation and backyard gardening. She is the co-owner of Preserve, an educational center for home gardening and food preservation, and creator of the PortlandPreserve.com, on which she writes a blog called The Householder's Grab Bag. She also blogs for Culinate.com.

Fasenfest regards home food preservation as a political and economic statement. She uses the term "householding" rather than "homemaking" or "home economics" to describe her work. She published her views on home gardening and food preservation in A Householder's Guide to the Universe: A Calendar of Basics for the Home and Beyond. The book is organized by month and season.

She lives in Portland, Oregon.

== Bibliography ==
- A Householder Guide to the Universe: A Calendar of Basics for the Home and Beyond. Portland, Oregon: Tin House Books. 2010. ISBN 978-0-9825691-5-3.
- Preserving With Friends DVD: An easy step-by-step instructional guide to putting up the harvest. Preserving With Friends, LLC. 7 June 2011. ISBN 978-0-615-47698-8.

=== Book reviews ===
- Smith, Sarah E. (17 November 2010). "Harriet Fasenfest 'A Householder's Guide To The Universe'". Willamette Week. Archived from the original on 2 October 2016.
- Passaro, Jamie (14 November 2010). "Getting back to the land". The Register-Guard.
- "The Householders Guide To The Universe". City Farmer News. 2010. Archived from the original on 7 October 2011.
