= Thomas Jefferson Dreams of Sally Hemings =

Historical-fiction novel by Stephen O'Connor

- First edition (publ. Viking Press)
- Author: Stephen O'Connor
- Language: English
- Publication date: 2016

Thomas Jefferson Dreams of Sally Hemings is a 2016 historical fiction novel by American writer Stephen O'Connor. The novel depicts the relationship between Thomas Jefferson, third President of the United States, and Sally Hemings, his slave and sister-in-law. The depiction, which portrayed the relationship as consensual and romantic, was the focus of controversy due to questions about Hemings's status as a slave and her age difference with Jefferson.

== Synopsis ==
The novel utilizes several storytelling devices through which O'Connor depicts a fictionalized account of the relationship between Hemings and Jefferson. Per the book jacket, " O'Connor's protagonists are rendered via scrupulously researched scenes of their lives in Paris and at Monticello that alternate with a harrowing memoir written by Hemings after Jefferson's death, as well as with dreamlike sequences in which Jefferson watches a movie about his life, Hemings fabricates an "invention" that becomes the whole world, and they run into each other "after an unimaginable length of time" on the New York City subway."

== Development ==
O'Connor chose to title the novel Thomas Jefferson Dreams of Sally Hemings after discussing it with his editor, as there was concern that the title "indicated that this book was neither nonfiction—history or biography—nor a conventional historical novel." He further noted that the novel presented Jefferson who "has and lacks power simultaneously" and that the novel's dream-like and surreal states was chosen because he "wanted to render some of the complexity of the real world, especially when it comes to someone like Jefferson, whose character seems such a mix of the admirable and despicable that his biographer, Joseph Ellis, called him an "American Sphinx." During his time developing the book, Steven O'Connor, who taught non-fiction writing at Sarah Lawrence College, gave his students the assignment to use research to write their own stories about Thomas Jefferson and Sally Hemmings. "

== Release ==
Thomas Jefferson Dreams of Sally Hemings was first released in the United States on April 5, 2016 through Viking in hardback. A paperback edition was released through Penguin Books the following year.

== Reception ==
Upon release Thomas Jefferson Dreams of Sally Hemings has received both praise and criticism. Criticism for the novel focused on the portrayal of the relationship between Thomas Jefferson and Sally Hemings; praise centered upon O'Connell's writing.

Jean Zimmerman of NPR gave the novel a favorable review, praising O'Connell's research and writing while also noting that the relationship between Jefferson and Hemings made them uncomfortable but that "history's discomforts have their attractions all the same." Ron Charles of the Washington Post also praised O'Connell's writing and research. Meredith Maran of the Chicago Tribune felt that O'Connell "takes a risky stance, characterizing a multi-decade sexual relationship between a slave owner and a slave as anything other than rape. What justifies the risk is his insistence on using a full palette and tiny brushes to draw these characters, rejecting broad brush strokes in black and white."

=== Depiction of the Jefferson-Hemings relationship ===
O'Connell's depiction of the relationship between Jefferson and Hemings received criticism from some media outlets and on social media. Points of contention focused on whether Hemings was capable of consenting to a relationship due to being a slave as well as the age difference between the two; Jefferson was in his 40s while Hemings was approximately 14 years old when their relationship is believed to have begun.

Constance Grady of Vox and K.W. Colyard of Bustle both noted that as Hemings was a slave, she would be incapable of giving or withdrawing consent, with Colyard further stating that "You can't wave a magic wand and make historical tragedies disappear because you want to write a shocking, "sexy" story." The novel was criticized on social media and by authors such as Ijeoma Oluo and Roxane Gay.

Of the relationship between the two historical figures, O'Connell wrote in an author's note that he "At the beginning I assumed that Jefferson and Hemings' relationship had commenced with rape and amounted to, at best, a grudging submission on her part to demands she was powerless to resist …. Eventually I came to believe that Hemings's feelings for Jefferson might well have fallen somewhere along the spectrum between love and Stockholm syndrome." Ron Charles noted that depicting the relationship between Hemings and Jefferson was difficult, as if "he makes Sally a willing participant in this relationship, he risks excusing the malignancy in our national mythology. But if he portrays Sally as a wholly powerless victim, he denies her ability to negotiate the contradictory forces at work in Jefferson's delusional paradise."

Brendan Wolfe of Encyclopedia Virginia was critical of Grady's Vox article, as he felt that they were viewing the novel and Hemings through a modern day perspective. He stated that there was no concrete evidence that Jefferson fathered Hemings's children as the DNA evidence could only show that a male of the Jefferson family was the father. Wolfe also wrote that the relationship between Jefferson and Hemings was something of which that historians only recently began to argue in favor. He also questioned the accuracy of the term 'teenager' in the time period that the book was set, as it was a more recent term and that in Hemings's time she would be seen more as an adult than a child or anything in between.
