= Alex Lemon =

American poet and memoirist

Alex Lemon (born in 1978) is an American poet and memoirist.

Lemon is the author of five books: The poetry collections Mosquito (Tin House Books 2006), Hallelujah Blackout (Milkweed Editions 2008), Fancy Beasts (Milkweed Editions 2010), and The Wish Book (Milkweed Editions 2014) and Happy: A Memoir (Scribner 2010).

Lemon is an editor-at-large for Saturnalia Books; poetry editor of descant, TCU's literary journal, sits on the editorial board of TCU Press and The Southern Review's advisory board. His awards and honors include a 2005 Literature Fellowship in Poetry from the National Endowment for the Arts, a 2006 Minnesota Arts Board Grant, and inclusion in the Best American Poetry 2008 anthology. He lives in Fort Worth, Texas and teaches at Texas Christian University.

Lemon's works are in 544 libraries, according to WorldCat.

== Bibliography ==
2006 — Mosquito. Tin House Books. ISBN 0-9773127-4-7
2008 — Hallelujah Blackout. Milkweed Editions. ISBN 978-1-57131-431-4
2010 — Happy. Scribner. ISBN 978-1-4165-5023-5
2010 — Fancy Beasts. Milkweed Editions. ISBN 978-1-57131-443-7
2014 — The Wish Book. Milkweed Editions.
2017 — Feverland: A Memoir in Shards. Milkweed Editions.
2019 — Another Last Day. Milkweed Editions.
