= New Ohio Review =

American literary magazine

- Editor: David Wanczyk
- Former editors: J. Allyn Rosser, Catherine Taylor
- Frequency: Biannual
- Circulation: 2,500
- Publisher: Ohio University
- Founded: 2007
- Country: United States
- Based in: Athens, Ohio
- Language: English
- Website: https://newohioreview.org/

New Ohio Review is a national literary magazine produced by the creative writing program of Ohio University in Athens, Ohio. Published biannually since 2007, the magazine showcases short fiction, poetry, and essays. Writers published by New Ohio Review have included Tony Hoagland, Robert Pinsky, Rosanna Warren, and Rachel Zucker, among others. Pieces Appearing in New Ohio Review have been included in such anthologies as The Best American Series and the Pushcart Prize anthology. The journal is a recipient of a National Endowment for the Arts grant.

== History ==
The first issue of New Ohio Review was published in the spring of 2007. In 2008 that first issue received both "Creative Best" and the Jury's prize at the Columbus Design Awards. Later, in 2010, Writer's Digest devoted a full-page feature to the journal. That same year, editor J. Allyn Rosser received the Ohioana Library Association's James P. Barry Award for Editorial Excellence. In 2011, New Ohio Review received a National Endowment for the Arts grant. From 2012 to 2015, the magazine was awarded Ohio Arts Council grants. In 2017, pieces from that year's issues received 14 Pushcart Prize nominations; that same year, New Ohio Review received an OAC ArtStart grant. In 2019, New Ohio Review also received Pushcart Prize nominations and an Ohio Arts Council Sustainability Grant.

== Contest ==
In addition to its regular output, New Ohio Review hosts an annual contest in which writers can submit their work for the chance to win a prize of $1000 in each genre. Winning submissions are published in the journal's fall issue. Submissions are reviewed by outside judges. Judges for the contest have included Ann Beattie, Tony Hoagland, Phillip Lopate, Elena Passarello, and Colm Tóibín, among others. Winners have included Rachel Cochran, Julie Hanson, Christopher Kempf, Suzanne McConnell, Michael Pearce, and Leslie Rodd.

== Appearances in The Best American Series ==
Poems and short stories in these collections were first published in New Ohio Review.

The Best American Poetry:

- The Best American Poetry 2011, Robert Pinsky's "Horn" and Bob Hicok's "Having Intended Merely to Pick on an Oil Company..."
- The Best American Poetry 2012, Steve Orlen's "Where Do We Go After We Die" and David Yezzi's "Minding Rites"
- The Best American Poetry 2013, Nathan Anderson's "Stupid Sandwich"
- The Best American Poetry 2015, Bethany Schultz Hurst's "Crisis on Infinite Earths: Issues 1-12"
- The Best American Poetry 2016, Eleanor Wilner's "To Think of How Cold"
- The Best American Poetry 2017, Billy Collins's "The Present" and David Brendan Hopes's "Certain Things"
- The Best American Poetry 2020, Tony Hoagland's "Sunday at the Mall"
- The Best American Poetry 2021, Darius Simpson's "What Is There To Do In Akron, Ohio", Emily Lee Luan's "When my Sorrow was Born", Hannah Marshal's "This is a Love Poem to Trees", and Nancy Miller Gomez's "Tilt-A-Whirl"

The Best American Short Stories:

- The Best American Short Stories 2012, Carol Anshaw's "The Last Speaker of the Language"
- The Best American Short Stories 2015, Kevin Canty's "Happy Endings"
