= Sharon Solwitz =

Fiction writer and professor (born 1945)

- Born: 1945
- Occupations: Short story writer, Novelist, College Professor

Sharon Solwitz is a fiction writer and professor based in Chicago, Illinois. She is the author of the short story collection Blood and Milk and the novels Bloody Mary and Once, in Lourdes. Tom Perotta and Heidi Pitlor selected her story "Alive" for inclusion in The Best American Short Stories 2012, and her story "Gifted" was chosen for the 2016 collection. She earned a Ph.D. from the University of Illinois at Chicago in 1991, and teaches creative writing at Purdue University.
