= Stephen O'Connor =

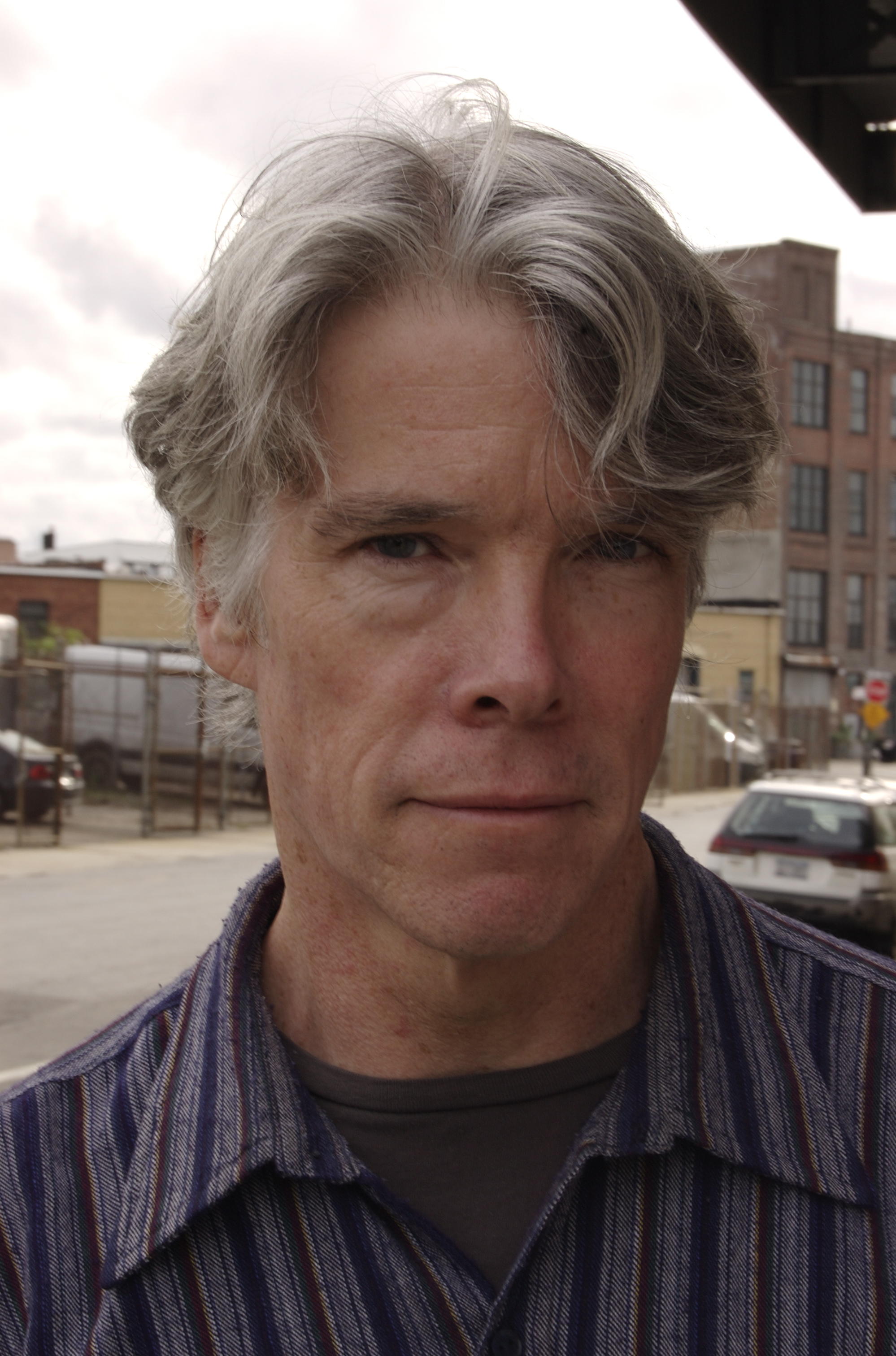
- Born: May 21, 1953 (age 73); New York City, U.S.
- Education: Columbia University; University of California, Berkeley
- Occupation: Writer
- Writing career
- Genres: Fiction; non-fiction; poetry
- Website: www.stephenoconnor.net

Stephen O’Connor (born May 21, 1952) is an American writer of fiction, non-fiction and poetry. His most recent novel Thomas Jefferson Dreams of Sally Hemings has been published by Viking. His short fiction has appeared in The New Yorker, The Best American Short Stories, Conjunctions, and New England Review. His essays have appeared in The New York Times, and Agni. His poems have been in Poetry, The Beloit Poetry Journal, and Missouri Review.

== Early life ==
O’Connor was born May 21, 1952, in Brooklyn, New York to an Irish father and a French mother. He grew up mainly in New Jersey, and attended Columbia University, where he studied with Kenneth Koch and U.C. Berkeley, where he studied with Leonard Michaels.

He published his first short story, “On the Wing”, in Partisan Review in 1981. His first book was Rescue (Harmony, 1989), a collection of short stories, some realistic, some surrealistic, and a long narrative poem about John Wesley Powell’s exploration of the Grand Canyon.

== Literary and teaching career ==
From 1988 until 1996, he directed a school-wide Teachers and Writers Collaborative program at a combined elementary and middle school in New York City, which became the subject of his second book, Will My Name Be Shouted Out? (Simon & Schuster, 1996). While this book is nominally a memoir, it primarily concerns a group of students whom O’Connor helped to write and perform plays about actual incidents of violence in New York City, and whose lives exemplify the ways that talented and hard-working Black and Latino children are ill-served by schools, social policy and many other aspects of American culture

O’Connor returned to the topics of poor children and social policy in his next book, Orphan Trains; The Story of Charles Loring Brace and the Children He Saved and Failed (Houghton Mifflin, 2001), a nonfiction account of a controversial nineteenth and early twentieth century effort, under which vagrant and/or orphaned children in New York City were sent, generally by train to the country where they would be taken in and sometimes exploited by local families.

Like Rescue, Here Comes Another Lesson (Free Press, 2010), O’Connor’s second collection of short fiction, contains a wide variety of surreal and realistic stories, one about a minotaur and a computer-game playing “new girl", another about a traumatized soldier just back from Iraq, and a series of stories about a professor of atheism.

Ron Charles from The Washington Post reviewed the most recent novel and said that "[...] with its magically engineered collection of fiction, history and fantasy, and particularly with its own capacious spirit, Thomas Jefferson Dreams of Sally Hemings doesn’t just knock Jefferson off his pedestal, it blows us over, too, shatters the whole sinner-saint debate and clears out new room to reconsider these two impossibly different people who once gave birth to the United States. It’s heartbreaking. It’s cathartic. It’s utterly brilliant."

== Publications ==
=== Books ===
- Thomas Jefferson Dreams of Sally Hemings, Viking
- Here Comes Another Lesson, Free Press
- Orphan Trains; The Story of Charles Loring Brace and the Children He Saved and Failed, Houghton Mifflin/U. Chicago
- Will My Name Be Shouted Out?, Simon & Schuster/Touchstone
- Rescue, New York, Harmony Books

=== Fiction ===
- Bell's Door ISBN 0-943568-01-3
- We Want So Much to Be Ourselves ISBN 9781954276581

=== Nonfiction ===
- “Against Assessment,” Beck, Heather, ed. Teaching Creative Writing in Higher Education
- “Charles Loring Brace,” Shweder, Richard A., ed. The Chicago Companion to the Child
