= Mark Slouka =

American novelist and essayist (born 1958)

- Born: 1958 (age 67–68); New York City, U.S.
- Education: Columbia University (PhD)
- Occupations: Novelist, essayist
- Writing career
- Language: English
- Notable awards: Guggenheim Fellow (2005)

Mark Slouka (born 1958 in New York City) is an American novelist and essayist who was awarded a Guggenheim Fellowship in 2005. He is a frequent contributor to Harper's Magazine.

== Education and career ==
Slouka was born to Czech immigrants, Olga and Zdenek Slouka. In 1987 he graduated with Ph.D. from Columbia University and became a teacher. From 1985 to 1989 he served as Teaching Fellow at Harvard University where he was giving courses in American Literature. After a one-year interlude at the Pennsylvania State University, Slouka moved to the University of California, San Diego, where from 2005 to 2006 he was a chairman of the Division of Creative Writing and in 1999 was a professor at Writing Division of the Columbia University.

== Literary works ==
Slouka's first subject matter was the 1996 book War of the Worlds: Cyberspace and the Assault on Reality which encompasses the extent to which virtual reality and blurring of real life with corporate fantasy has become a "genuine cultural phenomenon". In 2003, Slouka's first novel God's Fool fictionalized the life of conjoined twins Chang and Eng Bunker.

An essay of his entitled "Listening for Silence: Notes on the Aural Life" appeared in the 2004 anthology Audio Cultures. In this essay, Slouka inputs concepts and questions that pose a philosophical debate as to what silence is. Can silence really exist, or is it just what people decide to ignore that makes silence? Although people take notice of the visual landscape of our world, the change in aural landscape goes by seemingly unnoticed. Slouka views death as silence and, in some regards, it is because a human lacks the ability to hear any longer. Fear of silence is what creates the drive for noise and music. Slouka even says "fear forces our hand, inspires us, makes visible the things we love." Silence is an entity that brings out curiosity and there are other ways of describing it. Mainly, Slouka's contribution to the book made for some contrasting ideologies between musicians and authors such as Mark Slouka. In 2006 Slouka writes his short story "Dominion", originally published in TriQuarterly, was included within the anthology The Best American Short Stories 2006. His short story "The Hare's Mask", originally published in Harper's, was included in the anthology The Best American Short Stories 2011.

His second novel, The Visible World, tells the story of a son uncovering his flawed parents' earlier life in the Czech resistance. It gained notability in the UK following its inclusion in the 2008 Richard & Judy Book Club list.

In his book Essays from the Nick of Time, Slouka argues that "The humanities are a superb delivery mechanism for what we might call democratic values" In one of the essays, "Quitting the Paint Factory", he states, "Idleness is ... requisite to the construction of a complete human being; ... allowing us time to figure out who we are, and what we believe; by allowing us time to consider what is unjust, and what we might do about it."

His third novel (published in 2013) Brewster was called "instantly mesmerizing" by Pulitzer Prize–winner Jennifer Egan.

== Awards ==
In 2011, Slouka received the PEN/Diamonstein-Spielvogel Award for the Art of the Essay for Essays from the Nick of Time and a year later was awarded with the O. Henry Award.

== Bibliography ==
- —— (1996). War of the Worlds: Cyberspace and the High-tech Assault on Reality. Basic Books. ISBN 9780465004867.
- —— (1998). Lost Lake: Stories. Alfred A. Knopf. ISBN 9780375402159.
- —— (2002). God's Fool: A Novel. Alfred A. Knopf. ISBN 9780375402166.
- —— (2007). The Visible World: A Novel (hardcover 1st ed.). Houghton Mifflin Harcourt. ISBN 9780618756438.
- —— (2010). Essays from the Nick of Time: Reflections and Refutations. Graywolf Press. ISBN 9781555975715.
- —— (2013). Brewster: A Novel (hardcover 1st ed.). W. W. Norton & Company. ISBN 9780393239751.
- —— (2016). Nobody's Son: A Memoir. W. W. Norton & Company. ISBN 9780393292305.
- —— (2018). All That Is Left Is All That Matters: Stories. W. W. Norton & Company. ISBN 9780393292282.
