= Shobha Rao =

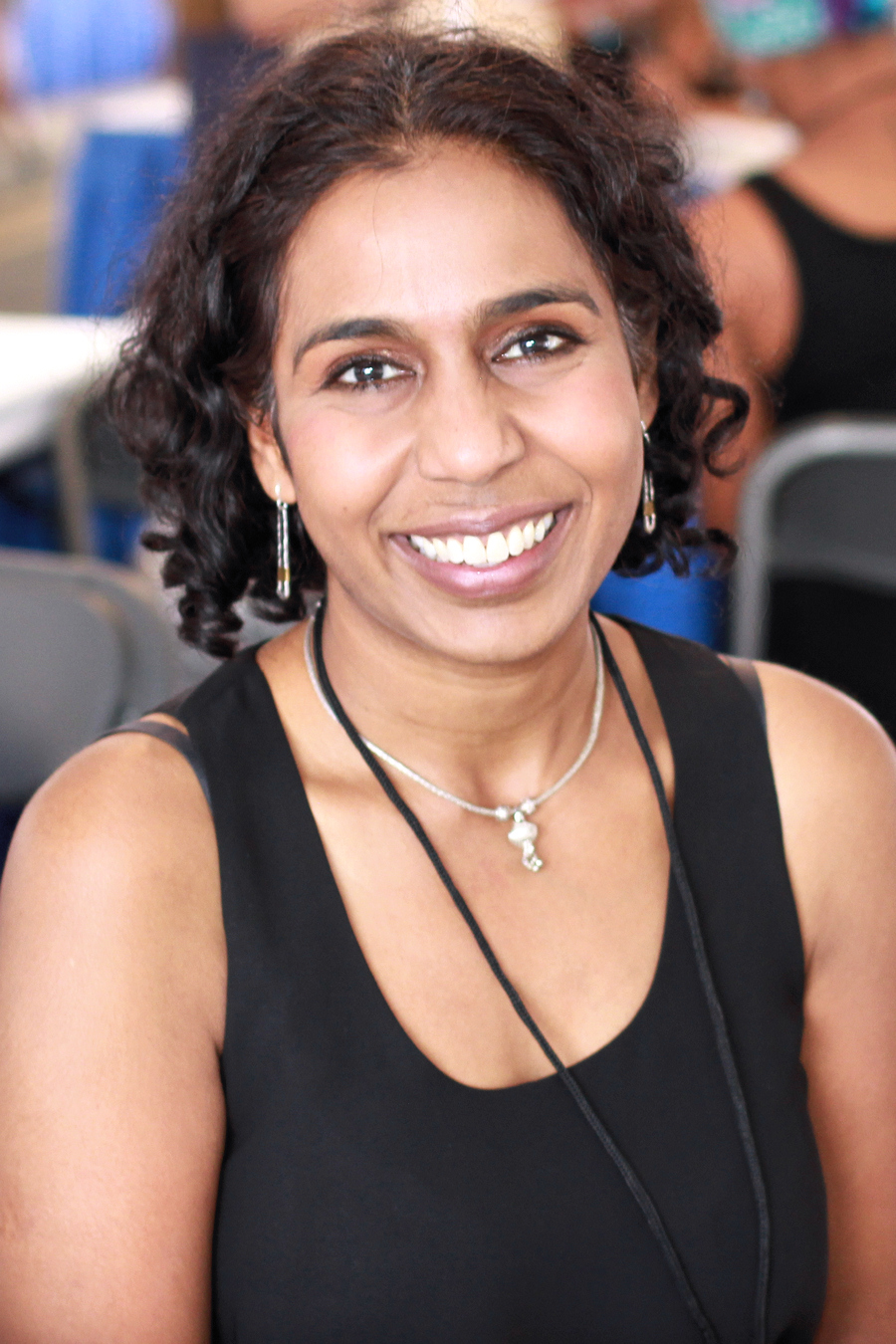
- Born: India
- Occupation: Author
- Writing career
- Genres: novel, short fiction
- Notable works: Girls Burn Brighter; An Unrestored Woman
- Notable awards: 2014 Katherine Ann Porter Prize for Fiction
- Website: shobharaowrites.com

Shobha Rao is an American novelist, having immigrated from India. She won the 2014 Katherine Anne Porter Prize in Short Fiction, is a recipient of the Elizabeth George Foundation fellowship, and has been anthologized in The Best American Short Stories 2015.

== Writing and reception ==
In 2016 Rao released An Unrestored Women, a collection of short stories connected to the division of British India into India and Pakistan.

Rao's 2018 debut novel, Girls Burn Brighter, has been praised for its "sustained and elegant prose", though USA Today said that the "empowering message gets lost in the overheated language and imagery"; the review concluded that once "Rao learns to dial down the melodrama, she’ll be a formidable writer". Another reviewer calls Rao "a natural storyteller". Rao's other work, An Unrestored Woman, is a short story collection that was called "a breathless and fascinating read".

In 2025 Rao released the novel Indian Country, which tells the story of a young married couple who move from Varanasi, India to Montana.

A theme throughout Rao's works is oppression, especially of women.

== Works ==
- An Unrestored Woman. Flatiron Books 2016. ISBN 9781250073822, OCLC 945954924
- Girls Burn Brighter. New York, N.Y.: Flatiron Books, 2018. ISBN 9781250074256, OCLC 1005782720
- Indian Country. Crown, 2025. ISBN 9780593798959
