= Chicago-style politics =

American political catchphrase

"Chicago-style politics" is a phrase which has been used to refer to the city of Chicago, regarding its hard-hitting, sometimes corrupt politics. It was used to refer to the Republican machine in the 1920s run by William Hale Thompson, as when Time magazine said, "to Mayor Thompson must go chief credit for creating 20th Century Politics Chicago Style."

The phrase was also used to refer to the Democratic Party machine, or "boss", politics of Chicago during the twentieth century. Political scientist Harold Gosnell wrote the most detailed analysis in Machine Politics: Chicago Model (University of Chicago Press, 1937). Paul E. Peterson extended the term to cover School Politics, Chicago Style (University of Chicago Press, 1976). Paul Kleppner looked at ethnic politics in the city in "Mayoral Politics Chicago Style: The Rise and Fall of a Multiethnic Coalition, 1983-1989", National Political Science Review 5 (1995): 152–180.

The term has been used by critics of the administration of Chicago Mayor Richard J. Daley, and to Chicago's history of political corruption more generally. More recently, the phrase was used by Republican Party politicians and activists during the 2008 presidential election and 2012 presidential election campaigns against Barack Obama, who had lived in Chicago since 1985.

The phrase has also been used in recent years to characterize a supposedly offensive "tough, take-no-prisoners approach to politics".

== Origins and meaning ==
Journalists Chuck McCutcheon and David Mark have described the phrase "Chicago politics" as a reference to the "unsavory and even corrupt" aspects of politics in Chicago, and noted that in the heyday of the Chicago machine, this included patronage, nepotism, and "activities that regularly drew the attention of federal prosecutors." According to McCutcheon and Mark, Chicago Mayor Richard J. Daley's tenure as mayor "is often considered Chicago-style politics at its worst."

The term "Chicago-style politics" was often used as a shorthand for political corruption. In 1970, for example, historian Humbert Nelli suggested in a historical profile of early twentieth-century mafia boss Anthony D'Andrea that Andrea had possessed all the qualities necessary to excel at "Chicago-style politics" - namely, the need to be "cynical, vicious, corrupt, pragmatic and well connected with criminal elements."

Nelli had been referring to the politics of Chicago around 1910, but the phrase was also used to describe contemporary Chicago politics during the 1970s. In 1977, for example, Chicago Tribune reporter Stanley Ziemba described "charges of corrupt patronage systems, mob influence, and political clout and reprisals" as the hallmarks of "Chicago-style politics" while reporting on civic elections in Chicago's suburbs.

Reporters have often used the term in this way since the 1970s. In 2003, for example, Seattle Weekly editor David Brewster, said that "Chicago-style politics" were "coming to Seattle" in reference to a local scandal over campaign contributions, defining the phrase as "this whole muscling-the-opposition, reward-your-friends and punish-your-enemies, tough-guy politics."

== Use in 2008 and 2012 elections ==
According to McCutcheon and Mark, the phrase "Chicago-style politics" took on "new resonance" in the political campaign advertisements of Republican presidential candidate John McCain when Democratic US Senator Barack Obama of Chicago, Illinois, ran for president in 2008. For example, McCain's political campaign said Obama practiced "Chicago-style politics", implying corruption.

Republican presidential primary candidate Mitt Romney introduced the phrase into the rhetoric of the 2012 presidential campaign when he described a recess appointment by President Obama as "Chicago-style politics at its worst." Romney supporters used "Chicago" as an epithet and referred disdainfully to "Chicago-style politics".

According to Jacob Weisberg of Slate magazine the phrase was "mainly" a way for Mitt Romney to "call Obama corrupt without coming out and saying so". The Chicago Tribune characterized the refrain as an attempt to discredit Obama through "guilt by geography", saying "Chicago has seen a goodly share of high- and low-profile officials and operatives shipped off to prison over the decades, and Republicans would like to prod voters into thinking that some of that dirt surely must have rubbed off on Obama." Drake University professor of political science Dennis Goldford, an expert on presidential politics, suggested that Republicans were using the phrase to imply that Obama was a product of an outdated large urban political organization based on unethical behavior and the use of force.

== See also ==
- Political history of Chicago
- Cook County Democratic Party
