= Eric Puchner =

American novelist and short story writer

Eric Puchner is an American novelist and short story writer.

== Life ==
His short stories have appeared in Tin House, Chicago Tribune, The Sun, The Missouri Review, and Best New American Voices. He was a fellow at Bread Loaf Writers' Conference. His story, "Beautiful Monsters", was selected by Tom Perrotta for the 2012 edition of The Best American Short Stories.

He attended Chadwick School high school. He taught at San Francisco State University, Stanford University, and Claremont McKenna College.

In February, 2025, Puchner's novel Dream State became Oprah Winfrey's 111th Book Club selection.

He currently teaches at Johns Hopkins University. He lives in Baltimore with his wife, novelist Katharine Noel, and their two children.

== Awards ==
- Pushcart Prize XXVIII
- Wallace Stegner Fellowship
- 2006 National Endowment for the Arts grant
- Music Through the Floor, which was a New York Times Book Review Editor's Choice and a finalist for the New York Public Library Young Lions Fiction Award.
- PEN/Faulkner Award Finalist

== Work ==
- "Animals Here Below". Zoetrope: All Story. 9 (3). Fall 2005.
- "Children of God". Zoetrope: All Story. 6 (4). Winter 2002.

=== Novels ===
- Model Home: A Novel, Simon and Schuster, 2010, ISBN 978-0-7432-7048-9
- Dream State, Penguin/Doubleday, 2025, ISBN 9780385550666

=== Short stories ===
- Music Through the Floor. Simon and Schuster. 2005. ISBN 978-0-7432-7046-5.
- Last Day on Earth. 2017

=== Non-fiction ===
- "I MARRIED A NOVELIST". Canteen. 4. 2009. Archived from the original on May 20, 2009.

=== Anthologies ===
- Best New American Voices 2005, John Kulka, Natalie Danford, Francine Prose (eds), Harcourt, 2004, ISBN 978-0-15-602899-8
