= Chadwick School =

School in Palos Verdes Peninsula, California, US

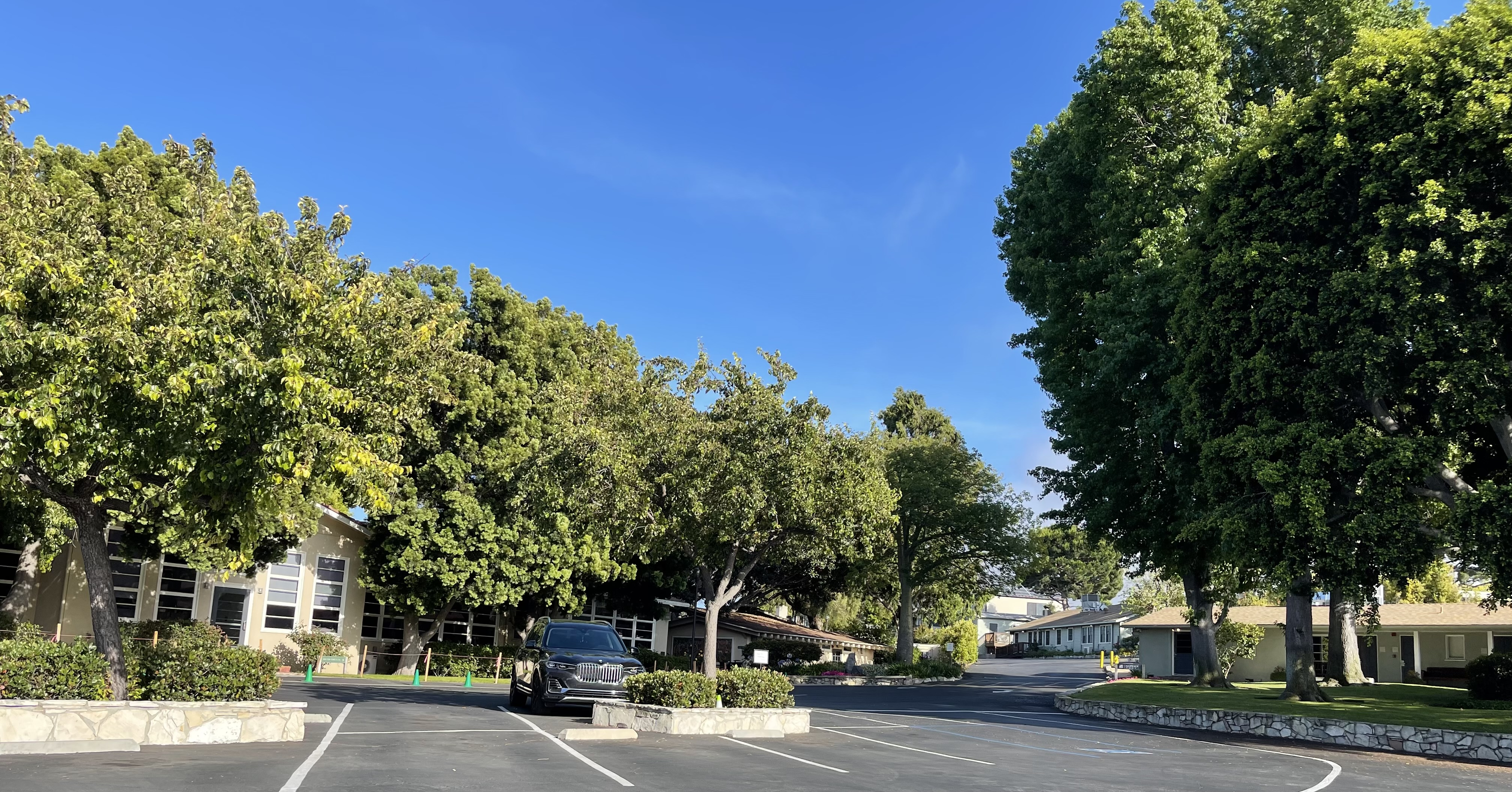

Location
- 26800 South Academy Drive; Palos Verdes Peninsula, California 90274; United States; 33°46′36″N 118°21′40″W

Information
- Type: Independent
- Established: 1935; 91 years ago
- Head of school: Jessica Donovan
- Faculty: 106
- Grades: K-12
- Enrollment: 830 (2013-2014: Village School(K-6): 320; Middle School(7-8): 150; Upper School(9-12): 360)
- Campus: Suburban
- Campus size: 45 acres (18 ha)
- Colors: Navy and white
- Athletics: 24 CIF Varsity teams
- Athletics conference: CIF Southern Section Prep League
- Mascot: Pacific bottlenose dolphin
- Endowment: $20,706,482
- Website: chadwickschool.org

Chadwick School is a nonsectarian independent K-12 day school located in an unincorporated area on the Palos Verdes Peninsula in Los Angeles County, California, United States. Specifically it is located at the top of the neighborhood referred to as Academy Hill, which is bounded by a canyon, a precipice, Crenshaw Boulevard, and Palos Verdes Drive North.

== History ==
The school was founded in 1935 by Margaret Lee Chadwick and Commander Joseph Chadwick in San Pedro, California. In 1938, the school moved to Palos Verdes, California. In the beginning, Chadwick was an open-air day and boarding school for 75 students, named Chadwick Open Air School.

In 1938, the Chadwick Seaside School officially opened on land donated by Palos Verdes developer, Frank Vanderlip. Chadwick School’s co-founders, the Roesslers also provided financial support.

After the retirement of the Chadwick family in 1963, the school created a board of trustees and in 1968 discontinued its boarding program.

In 1972, Chadwick joined the Cum Laude Society.

Up until the 1970s, the school owned all of the hill leading up to it, which was sold off to establish the school's endowment. As a result of the ensuing neighborhood development, the school's growth and traffic are constrained by a conditional-use permit with the Academy Hill Homeowners Association. Since the 1970s, the school has opened more buildings, such as the Geoffrey Alan Laverty Center for the Performing Arts, Leavenworth Library Learning Center, and Pascoe Pavilion Gymnasium. Chadwick School currently sits on 45 acres of land with 26 educational buildings.

It is accredited by the Western Association of Schools and Colleges. The movie adaptation of the book Mommie Dearest was filmed at Chadwick in 1981.

=== Student and faculty profile ===
2025 student enrollment is 854 students across three schools: the Village School (K-6), the Middle School (grades 7-8), and the Upper School (grades 9-12). The student to faculty ratio is 8:1. According to Niche 2025 rankings, the school ranked in the top 5% of independent schools in California and in the Los Angeles area. 80 percent of the faculty members held advanced degrees in the 2024-25 school year according to FindingSchool.com.

=== Chadwick International ===
Chadwick International's four-story atrium

On January 13, 2010, the school announced that it would be administering and integrating a sister school in South Korea. Chadwick was the third school chosen to administrate the new school after a deal with Vancouver International Primary and Secondary School fell through. Prior to that, the International School Service had submitted plans to run the school but withdrew them. Later in the process, the school's opening was delayed by Chadwick administrators when they failed to submit paperwork on time.

The school is located in the Songdo International City, a city renowned for its efforts to "go green" and is administratively a near replica of Chadwick School in Palos Verdes. Headmaster Ted Hill has stated that the sister school will remain in contact with the originating school through the use of Telepresence equipment supplied by Cisco.

The school opened on September 6, 2010, and completed its first year in June 2011. As of the 2013-14 school year, Chadwick International enrolled 780 students in grades pre-K through 10. Eleventh grade was added in September 2014, and the school graduated its first class in 2015-16. There are now frequent exchanges and visits between the two Chadwick campuses.

=== Sperm whale skull fossil ===
On February 5, 2014, a fossil of a sperm whale skull embedded in a boulder of Middle Miocene Era Altamira Shale located on the grounds of Chadwick School was removed to be studied at the L.A. County Natural History Museum. An expert from the museum believed that the skull might be of a previously unknown species. This event was widely covered by Los Angeles area news outlets.

== Extracurricular activities ==
=== Athletics ===
Commander field in preparation for a game

Chadwick's main rivals are Polytechnic School in Pasadena, California and Flintridge Preparatory School in La Cañada, California.

Chadwick participates in 23 Varsity CIF sports. They include boys' football, tennis, volleyball, waterpolo, basketball, soccer, baseball, golf, and girls' tennis, volleyball, water polo, equestrian, basketball, soccer, golf, lacrosse, softball, and cheerleading. They also include coed cross country, swimming, and track and field.

In 2007, Chadwick reevaluated its image and decided that yellow was not an appropriate school color. It also realized that its athletics logo featured a non-native dolphin. After these realizations, the school designed a new blue, grey, and white logo featuring a native and more aggressive-looking dolphin.

In 2022, the school updated their baseball and softball fields with a $1.5 million gift from businessman and philanthropist Warren Lichtenstein, whose son attended Chadwick School. The fields were renamed the Lichtenstein Family Field.

=== School newspaper ===
The school newspaper, The Mainsheet, is published in print and online. Online publication was restarted at the beginning of March 2012. In the school year of 2025-2026, The Mainsheet switched to a different website, which is still in use today.

=== Performing Arts ===
Chadwick offers robust programs in Theater, Vocal Music, Instrumental Music and Dance. Performances take place throughout the community and at the Geoffrey Alan Laverty Center for the Performing Arts. In 2015 the school was invited by producer John Gertz to pilot the first American school production of Zorro the Musical. In 2025 (as well as in many previous years), the Chadwick Upper School Chorus took place in the National Youth Choir Festival at Carnegie Hall.

== Intracurricular activities ==
=== Robotics ===
In 2006 members of the high school community started Wicked Wobotics, team 2150, a FIRST Robotics Competition team. The team won the Judges' choice award at the 2008 FIRST Robotics competition in Las Vegas, Nevada and was ranked sixth after the qualifying rounds. The FRC team was discontinued in 2010. The remaining team focused on the simpler and less expensive VEX Robotics Competition.

In 2011, the school added an optional robotics class to its science curriculum and moved into a larger room previously occupied by the maintenance department. In 2014, the team had 30 members and had to move to a much larger classroom. Chadwick Robotics also collaborates with the robotics program at the Chadwick International campus in Songdo, South Korea, sharing engineering techniques and innovative strategies for each year's contest.

== Notable alumni ==
=== Business ===
- Danese Cooper - computer scientist and open-source advocate, Wikipedia
- Jann Wenner - owner of Rolling Stone magazine

=== Medical ===
- David Chadwick - clinical research pediatrician, author, founder of Chadwick Center for Children and Autism Discovery Institute-San Diego, 2019 recipient of Chadwick School Distinguished Alumnus

=== Entertainment ===
- Christina Crawford - actor and author of Mommie Dearest
- Peter Davis - winner of the 1974 Academy Award for Best Documentary for Hearts and Minds
- Chuck Dukowski - bass player for 1970s punk rock band Black Flag
- Jessica Gottlieb - author
- Brandon Lee - actor and martial artist, son of Bruce Lee
- Shannon Lee - daughter of Bruce Lee, sister of Brandon Lee
- Mike Lookinland - actor, The Brady Bunch
- Liza Minnelli - winner of the Emmy, Grammy, Academy and Tony Awards
- Rick Moses - actor/singer/songwriter
- Maureen Reagan - actor, child of Ronald Reagan
- Pippa Scott - actress
- Robert Towne - screenwriter/director, winner of an Academy Award for the screenplay of Chinatown
- Michael Viner - record and audiobook producer
- Mark Sonnenblick - songwriter and composer, co-writer for "Golden" from K-Pop Demon Hunters which won Grammys, Golden Globes, Critics' Choice and an Oscar.

=== Literature ===
- Susan Berman - author and screenwriter
- Eric Puchner - novelist and short story writer
- George Starbuck - poet, winner of the 1983 Lenore Marshall Poetry Prize
- Peter Zuckerman - journalist (The Oregonian) and author

=== Athletics ===
- Lindsay Davenport - No. 1 ranked female tennis player
- Christen Press - Professional Soccer player. Two-time World Cup Champion, Olympian, recipient of the 2010 Hermann Trophy.
- Rebecca Smith - Olympic soccer player
- John Thorrington - soccer player/LAFC Co-President & General Manager

== Notable staff ==
- Margaret Lee Chadwick - school founder and headmistress (1935 to 1963)
- Latario Rachal - athletics coach
- Cedric Wright - photography teacher, recruited Ansel Adams to arrange darkroom and photograph school events
- Robert Lynn - Water Polo Coach and PE Teacher

== In literature ==
=== Nonfiction ===
- Hedy Lamarr: The Most Beautiful Woman in Film by Ruth Barton
- Getting Their Stories Straight, by Cris Mazza
- Indigenous: growing up Californian by Cris Mazza
- Mommie Dearest by Christina Crawford
- The Milk of Almonds: Italian American Women Writers on Food and Culture by Edvige Giunta
- The Boys of Riverside by Thomas Fuller

=== Fictional Chadwick School novels ===
- Surviving Chadwick: A Novel by Phillip Wilhite
- THE TRUST: A Secret Society Novel by Tom Dolby
- White Lines by Jennifer Banash. Several fictional teachers in the novel share their names with Chadwick faculty. For example, the character Mr. Cass in the novel shares his last name with a Chadwick teacher. Dr. Banash herself taught English at Chadwick.

=== Poetry ===
- From a Balcony in Palos Verdes by Sean McGrath, written while he lived in faculty housing on the campus of Chadwick School.

== Filmography ==
Film
Year	Film	Notes
1981	Mommie Dearest	Shot in main parking lot
