= Glimmer Train =

- Discipline: Literary journal
- Language: English

Publication details
- History: 1990-2018
- Publisher: Glimmer Train Press (United States)
- Frequency: Quarterly

Standard abbreviations
- ISO 4: Glimmer Train

Indexing
- ISSN: 1055-7520
- OCLC no.: 23298128

Links
- Journal homepage

Glimmer Train was an American short story literary journal. It was published quarterly, accepting works primarily from emerging writers. Stories published in Glimmer Train were listed in The Best American Short Stories, as well as appearing in the Pushcart Prize, The PEN/O. Henry Prize Stories, and anthologies for New Stories from the Midwest, New Stories from the South, and Best American Short Stories. The journal held 12 short story fiction contests a year, paying out over $50,000 on an annual basis.

== Background ==
Glimmer Train was founded in 1990 by Linda Swanson-Davies and her sister, Susan Burmeister-Brown, in Portland, Oregon. While the journal received over 40,000 submissions per year, only about 40 stories are published (a rate of 0.001, or 1/10 of 1%).

Burmeister-Brown advises writers to: "Unplug yourself from the hurly-burly of life on a regular basis so your subconscious has time to make some good compost."

== See also ==
- List of literary magazines
