= Tin House =

American literary magazine and book publisher

- Founded: 1998; 28 years ago
- Founder: Win McCormack
- Country of origin: United States
- Headquarters location: Brooklyn, New York and Portland, Oregon
- Distribution: W. W. Norton
- Publication types: Magazines, Books
- Official website: www.tinhouse.com

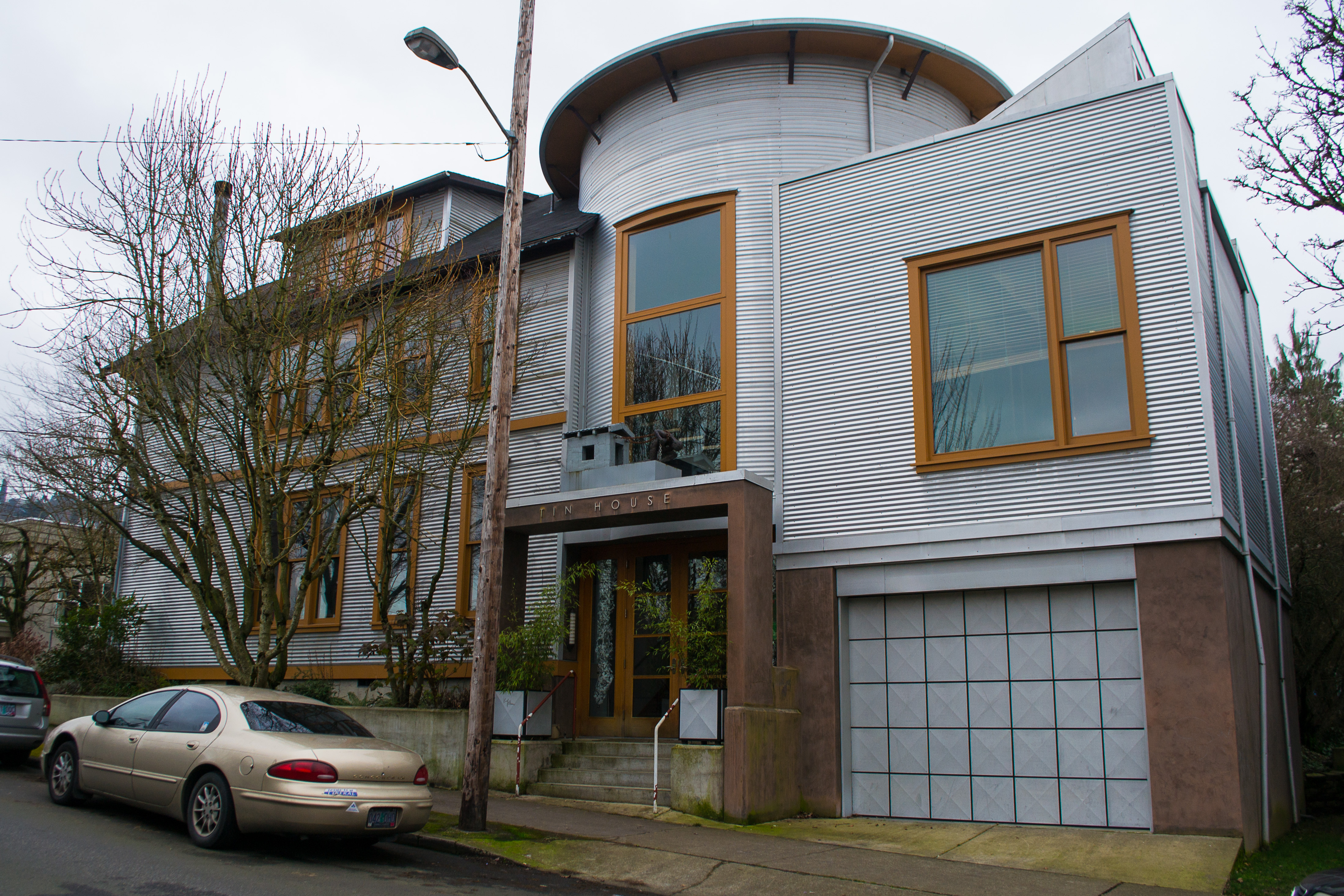
Tin House headquarters

Tin House is an American literary magazine and book publisher based in Portland, Oregon, and New York City.

== History ==
Portland publisher Win McCormack originally conceived the idea for a literary magazine called Tin House in the summer of 1998. He enlisted Holly MacArthur as managing editor and developed the magazine with the help of two experienced New York editors, Rob Spillman and Elissa Schappell.

In 2005, Tin House expanded into the book division, Tin House Books. They also began to run a by-admission-only summer writers' workshop held at Reed College.

Tin House
- Editor-in-chief: Win McCormack
- Categories: Literary magazine
- Frequency: Quarterly
- First issue: 1999
- Final issue: June 2019
- Country: United States
- Based in: Brooklyn, New York and Portland, Oregon
- Language: English
- Website: www.tinhouse.com
- ISSN: 1541-521X

Tin House was honored by major American literary awards and anthologies, particularly for its fiction. A story from the Summer 2003 issue, "Breasts" by Stuart Dybek, was featured in The Best American Short Stories for 2004, and in 2006, "Window" by Deborah Eisenberg was a "juror favorite" in The O. Henry Prize Stories.

In December 2018, Tin House announced that they were shuttering their literary magazine after 20 years, in order to focus on their book releases and workshops. The magazine was closed after the release of its June 2019 20th-anniversary issue.

In March 2025, Tin House Books was acquired by Zando.

== Content ==
Tin House published fiction, essays, and poetry, as well as interviews with important literary figures, a "Lost and Found" section dedicated to exceptional and generally overlooked books, "Readable Feast" food writing features, and "Literary Pilgrimages", about visits to the homes of writing greats. It was also distinguished from many other notable literary magazines by actively seeking work from previously unpublished writers to feature as "New Voices".

== Staff ==
- Publisher and Editor-in-Chief: Win McCormack
- Editor: Rob Spillman
- Art Director: Diane Chonette
- Deputy Publisher: Holly Macarthur
- Managing Editor: Cheston Knapp
- Executive Editor: Michelle Wildgen
- Senior Editor: Emma Komlos-Hrobsky
- Editor-at-Large: Elissa Schappell
- Associate Editor: Thomas Ross
- Poetry Editor: Camille T. Dungy
- Senior Designer: Jakob Vala
- Paris Editor: Heather Hartley
- Copy Editors: Meg Storey and Jess Kibler

== Writers whose work has appeared in Tin House ==
- Chris Adrian
- Sherman Alexie
- Dorothy Allison
- Steve Almond
- Yehuda Amichai
- Rebecca Aronson
- Tom Barbash
- Charles Baxter
- Aimee Bender
- Sarah Shun-lien Bynum
- Lucy Corin
- Ariel Dorfman
- Stuart Dybek
- Deborah Eisenberg
- Faiz Ahmed Faiz
- Richard Ford
- William Gay
- Allan Gurganus
- Seamus Heaney
- Ann Hood
- Bret Anthony Johnston
- Miranda July
- Yasunari Kawabata
- James Kelman
- William Keohane
- Stephen King
- Phil Klay
- Stanley Kunitz
- Jonathan Lethem
- Kelly Link
- Patricia Lockwood
- Rick Moody
- Alice Munro
- Pablo Neruda
- Sharon Olds
- Dawn Powell
- Peter Rock
- Marilynne Robinson
- Karen Russell
- Edward W. Said
- James Salter
- John Sanford
- Charles Simic
- Donna Tartt
- Quincy Troupe
- Danielle Trussoni
- David Foster Wallace

== Tin House Books ==
=== Staff ===
- Senior Editor: Masie Cochran
- Senior Editor: Tony Perez
- Assistant Editor: Elizabeth DeMeo
- Director of Marketing & Rights: Nanci McCloskey
- Director of Publicity: Molly Templeton
- Publicity and Marketing Assistant: Yashwina Canter
- Art Director: Diane Chonette
- Senior Designer: Jakob Vala
- Designer: Jeremy Cruz

=== Books published ===
- Best of Tin House (2006). ISBN 0-9773127-1-2
- Do Me: Tales of Sex and Love from Tin House (2007). ISBN 978-0-9794198-0-5
- Food and Booze: A Tin House Literary Feast (2006). ISBN 0-9773127-7-1
- The World Within (2007). ISBN 978-0-9776989-6-7
- Arnold-Ratliff, Katie. Bright Before Us (2011). ISBN 978-1-935639-07-7
- Becker, Geoffrey. Hot Springs (2010). ISBN 978-0-9820539-4-2
- Beha, Christopher. What Happened to Sophie Wilder (2012). 978-1935639312
- Bogan, Louis, trans. and ed. The Journal of Jules Renard (2008). ISBN 978-0-9794198-7-4
- Boren, Karen Lee. Girls in Peril (2006). ISBN 978-0-9773127-2-6
- Braver, Adam. "November 22, 1963" (2008). ISBN 978-0-9802436-2-8
- Corin, Lucy. The Entire Predicament (2007). ISBN 978-0-9776989-8-1
- DeVoto, Bernard. The Hour: A Cocktail Manifesto (2010). ISBN 978-0-9825048-0-2
- Erens, Pamela. The Virgins (2013). ISBN 1-935639-62-5
- Fasenfest, Harriet. A Householder's Guide to the Universe (2010). ISBN 978-0-9825691-5-3
- Freed, Dolly. Possum Living: How to Live Well Without a Job and With (Almost) No Money (2010). ISBN 978-0-9820539-3-5
- Fuller, Claire. Our Endless Numbered Days (2015). ISBN 978-1-9410400-1-0
- Goldfaden, Josh. Human Resources (2006). ISBN 0-9776989-1-2
- Grimes, Tom. Mentor: A Memoir (2010). ISBN 978-0-9825048-8-8
- Hallman, J. C. ed. The Story About the Story: Great Writers Explore Great Literature (2009). ISBN 978-0-9802436-9-7
- Harvey, Matthea, illustrated by Zechel, Elizabeth. The Little General and The Giant Snowflake (2009). ISBN 978-0-9776989-8-1
- Heyns, Michiel, introduction by A. L. Kennedy. "The Children's Day" (2009). ISBN 978-0-9802436-6-6
- Hirvonen, Elina. "When I Forgot" (2009). ISBN 978-0-9802436-5-9
- Hunt, Samantha. "The Seas" (2018). ISBN 978-1-9410409-5-9
- Krusoe, Jim. "Erased." (2009) ISBN 978-0-9802436-7-3
- Krusoe, Jim. Girl Factory (2008). ISBN 978-0-9794198-2-9
- Lawrence, Sarahlee. River House (2007). ISBN 978-0-9825691-3-9
- Lemon, Alex. Mosquito (2006). ISBN 0-9773127-4-7
- Matheson, Michele. Saving Angelfish (2006). ISBN 0-9773127-6-3
- McCormack, Win. You Don't Know Me: A Citizen's Guide to Republican Family Values (2008). ISBN 978-0-9794198-6-7
- Michaels, Sean. Us Conductors (2014).
- Montgomery, Lee and Tony Perez, eds. "The Writer's Notebook" (2009). ISBN 978-0-9794198-1-2
- Morris, Keith Lee. Call It What You Want (2010). ISBN 978-0-9825030-8-9
- Morris, Keith Lee. The Dart League King (2008). ISBN 978-0-9794198-8-1
- Nevai, Lucia. Salvation (2008). ISBN 978-0-9794198-3-6
- Otis, Mary. Yes, Yes Cherries (2007) ISBN 978-0-9776989-0-5
- Parker, Jeff, Mikhail Iossel, eds. Francine Prose, intro. "Rasskazy: New Fiction from a New Russia" (2009). ISBN 978-0-9820539-0-4
- Parker, Jeff. Ovenman (2007). ISBN 978-0-9776989-2-9
- Pashley, Jennifer. The Scamp (2015). ISBN 978-1-941040-11-9
- Pico, Tommy. Nature Poem (2017). ISBN 978-1-941040-63-8
- Shaughnessy, Brenda and C. J. Evans, eds. "Satellite Convulsions: Poems from Tin House" (2008). ISBN 978-0-9794198-9-8
- Smith, Robert Paul, illustrated by Smith, Elinor Goulding. How to Do Nothing with Nobody All Alone by Yourself (2010). ISBN 978-0-9820539-5-9
- Smith, Zak. Pictures Showing What Happens on Each Page of Thomas Pynchon's Novel Gravity's Rainbow (2006). ISBN 0-9773127-9-8
- Smith, Zak. "We Did Porn" (2009). ISBN 978-0-9802436-8-0
- Sparling, Scott. Wire to Wire (2011). ISBN 978-1-935639-05-3
- Specktor, Matthew. American Dream Machine (2012). 978-1935639442
- Taylor, Kimball. The Coyote's Bicycle (2016). ISBN 978-1-941040-20-1
- van Niekerk, Marlene. Agaat (2010). ISBN 978-0-9825030-9-6
- Vanasco, Jeanie. The Glass Eye (2017). ISBN 978-1-941040-77-5
- Watson, Jan Elizabeth. Asta in the Wings (2009). ISBN 978-0-9802436-1-1

== See also ==
- List of literary magazines
