= PEN/Nora Magid Award for Magazine Editing =

The PEN/Nora Magid Award for Magazine Editing given by the PEN America (formerly PEN American Center) is awarded biennially to "a magazine editor whose high literary standards and taste have, throughout his or her career, contributed significantly to the excellence of the publication he or she edits." It was established in 1993.

Candidates include "current editors-in-chief, literary editors, and 'back-of-the-book' editors of serious general interest magazines, book reviews, or literary reviews and quarterlies, whose intellectual discernment and wide range of interests recall the late PEN member Nora Magid, who was for many years the literary editor of The Reporter."

The award is one of many PEN awards sponsored by International PEN affiliates in over 145 PEN centres around the world. The PEN American Center awards have been characterized as being among the "major" American literary prizes.

== Award winners ==
PEN/Nora Magid Award for Magazine Editing
Year	Recipient	Ref.
1993	Peter Stitt, editor of The Gettysburg Review	
1995	Herbert Leibowitz, editor of Parnassus	
1997	Wendy Lesser, editor of The Threepenny Review	
1999	Stan Lindberg, editor of The Georgia Review	
2001	Askold Melnyczuk, editor of AGNI	
2003	Robert Fogarty, editor of The Antioch Review	
2005	Willard Spiegelman, editor of Southwest Review	
2007	Bradford Morrow, editor of Conjunctions	
2009	Hannah Tinti, editor of One Story	
2011	Brigid Hughes, founding editor of A Public Space	
2013	Monika Bauerlein and Clara Jeffery, co-editors of Mother Jones	
2015	Rob Spillman, Tin House	
2017	Michael Archer and Joel Whitney, Guernica	
2019	Alexandra Watson, Apogee magazine	
2021	Kwame Dawes, editor of Prairie Schooner	
2025	Charles Henry Roswell, editor of Callaloo	
