= Moukawsher =

Moukawsher may refer to:

- Edward Moukawsher (born 1952), American politician
- Thomas G. Moukawsher (born 1962), American judge
