= Askold Melnyczuk =

American writer (born 1954)

- Born: December 12, 1954 (age 71); Irvington, New Jersey. U.S.
- Education: Cranford High School; Antioch College; Rutgers University (B.A.); Boston University (M.A.)
- Occupations: Novelist, essayist, memoirist, poet,
- Writing career
- Period: 1974–present
- Genres: Fiction, memoir, essay, poetry,
- Movements: popular, literary,
- Website: askoldmelnyczuk.net

Askold Melnyczuk (born December 12, 1954) is an American writer whose publications include novels, essays, poems, memoir, and translations. Among his works are the novels What Is Told, Ambassador of the Dead, House of Widows and Excerpt from Smedley's Secret Guide to World Literature. His work has been translated into German, Polish, Russian, and Ukrainian.

Melnyczuk also founded the literary journal AGNI and Arrowsmith Press (2006).

== Early life ==
Melnyczuk was born in Irvington, New Jersey. He was raised in Roselle Park and Cranford, New Jersey, 20 miles (32 km) south of New York City. His younger sister, Hanna, is a painter and teacher. His parents, Edward Melnyczuk and Olena Zahajkewycz Melnyczuk, were Ukrainian refugees who fled Peremyshl, Poland, in 1944, along with his grandfather, the noted scholar and educator, Bohdan Zahajkewycz. After five years in a refugee camp in Berchtesgaden, Germany, they were finally granted permission to emigrate to the United States. In 1975, the family, who sheltered a number of Jewish friends during the war, were designated "righteous among gentiles" and invited to plant a tree at Yad Vashem in Israel.

Melnyczuk graduated from Cranford High School, where a twelfth-grade English teacher underscored the single most important lesson for any writer: the art of revision. In high school, he won both a national essay contest and a state poetry prize. With friends, he also founded AGNI, which began as an "underground" newspaper and sold for a penny. While attending Antioch College, from 1972 through 1973, he transformed AGNI into a literary journal. He received his Bachelor of Arts degree from Rutgers University in 1976. That same year, he moved to Boston, Massachusetts, to attend Boston University's celebrated Creative Writing Program. Studying with poet George Starbuck and novelist Rosellen Brown, he graduated with a Master of Arts degree in 1977.

Melnyczuk met his future wife, writer Alexandra Johnson, while teaching in the Expository Writing Program at Harvard in 1990. They married in 1995, settling in Medford, Massachusetts.

His first national publication, a poem, appeared in The Village Voice in 1974. He began publishing fiction in national literary journals in 1979.

== Later life and works ==
Melnyczuk was introduced at the launch for his first novel, What is Told, by poet Seamus Heaney. Published in 1994, it was named a "New York Times Notable Book". Writing in The New York Times Book Review, Alida Becker observed: "To fall in love with Melnyczuk's voice is no trouble at all." His second novel, Ambassador of the Dead (2001), selected as one of the "Best Books of the Year" by the Los Angeles Times, was described "a triumph of style and storytelling" by Scott Morris. House of Widows (2008) is a "big novel…about love, war, duty, honor, betrayal, history, and politics," noted Booklist, the journal of the American Library Association, adding that it was "hard to put down and harder to forget," and naming it an "Editor's Choice" for the year. Kirkus Reviews noted that the "hallucinatory tale achieves something of the fierce, distracting power of D.H. Lawrence's nerve-grating masterpiece Women in Love."

Author Jill McCorkle said that Melnyczuk's fourth novel, Excerpt from Smedley's Secret Guide to World Literature, "charms the reader and steals the heart", while critic George Scialabba noted that "Jonathan Wainwright is the lambent essence of today's adolescence."

Melnyczuk received a Lila Bell Wallace-Reader's Digest Award in Fiction in 1997, as well as the McGinnis Award in Fiction from the Southwest Review in 1991. In 2001, he was awarded the biannual PEN/Nora Magid Award for Magazine Editing by the PEN American Center which cited AGNI as "one of America's, and the world's, best literary journals". That same year, he was honored by PEN New England with its "Friend to Writers" Award. In 2011, he received the George Garrett Award for Outstanding Community Service in Literature from the Association of Writers & Writing Programs. He has also received grants from the Massachusetts Cultural Council in fiction, poetry, and non-fiction. Stories and essays have both been listed on the Honor Roll of The Best American Short Stories (2001) and The Best American Essays (2008, 2010).

Melnyczuk's nonfiction and memoir has been published in AGNI, The Boston Globe, Epiphany, Harvard Review, the Los Angeles Times, Los Angeles Review of Books, The New York Times, Parnassus, The Threepenny Review, The Writer's Chronicle, and many other journals. His short stories have appeared in The Antioch Review, Boston Review, Chelsea, Denver Quarterly, The Gettysburg Review, Glimmer Train, Harvard Review, Irish Pages, The Massachusetts Review, The Missouri Review, Ropes (Ireland), Witness, and others. Poems have been anthologized in The McGraw Hill Anthology of Poetry, The Evolving Canon, and Under 35: The New Generation of American Poets, and have appeared in APR, The Alaska Quarterly Review, Boulevard, Denver Quarterly, Grand Street, The Nation, Partisan Review, Ploughshares, Poetry and many other publications.

Melnyczuk teaches at the University of Massachusetts Boston and in the Bennington College Writing Seminars.

== Arrowsmith Press ==
In 2006, Melnyczuk founded Arrowsmith Press, named after the late scholar and critic William Arrowsmith, which publishes "works of translation, original poetry, and prose, as well as a series of online columns exploring literature and our world." In 2019, Arrowsmith Press, in partnership with the Derek Walcott Festival in Port-of-Spain, Trinidad, and the Boston Playwrights' Theatre, began awarding the annual Derek Walcott Prize for Poetry to a full-length book of poems by a living poet who is not a US citizen published in the previous calendar year.

== Bibliography ==
=== Novels ===
- What Is Told (1994)
- Ambassador of the Dead (2001)
- House of Widows (2008)
- Excerpt from Smedley's Secret Guide to World Literature (2016)
- The Man Who Would Not Bow (2021)

=== Novellas ===
- Blind Angel (2002)

=== Poetry ===
- Under 35: The New Generation of American Poets (1989)
- The McGraw-Hill Book of Poetry (1993)
- The Evolving Canon (1995)

=== As editor ===
- Conscience, Consequence: On Father Daniel Berrigan (2006)
- On Bergstein (2007)
- From Three Worlds: New Writing from Ukraine (co-editor) (2000)
- Take Three Poetry Series ( 1996–1998)

=== As translator ===
- Girls by Oksana Zabuzhko (2005)
- Eight Notes from a Blue Angel by Marjana Savka (2007)
