= Bauerlein =

Bauerlein is a surname. Notable people with the surname include:

- Mark Bauerlein (born 1959), English professor and editor
- Monika Bauerlein (born 1965), American journalist
- Marita Bäuerlein (born 1944), German politician
