= Borzi =

Borzi is an Italian surname. Notable people with the surname include:

- Antonino Borzì (1852–1921), Italian botanist
- Phyllis Borzi, former Assistant Secretary for Employee Benefits Security of the United States Department of Labor
