= PromotionCode.org =

- Website type: Online coupons
- Available in: English
- Founded: Tallahassee, FL, U.S.
- Founders: Mike Catania, (CTO)
- Key people: Robert Russo, (CEO)
- Website: PromotionCode
- Launched: 2008
- Current status: Active

PromotionCode.org is a coupon website that provides promotional codes and print coupons to consumers. The corporation's headquarters is in Tallahassee, Florida and it has a west coast office in Las Vegas, Nevada.

== History ==
PromotionCode.org was founded in 2008 by Mike Catania while he was a part-time music technology instructor at the Florida State University. Originally, the site was an online forum and coupon rewards website for teachers. After being highlighted by Jean Chatzky on The Today Show and its website, PromotionCode.org transitioned from its forum format into its current structure with promotion codes organized by store. In 2012, the company had a dozen full-time employees and was originating over ten thousand new coupons monthly. In 2013, merchant services and coupon syndication were added to allow stores to manage their own offers.

Catania and PromotionCode.org have been mentioned, quoted or featured in media outlets including CBS News, USA Today's Home magazine, Yahoo! Finance, MSN, The Street, U.S. News & World Report, and Huffington Post. The site has also appeared in several books including William Keeley's Tech Tactics and Clarke Montgomery's How To Save Tons of Money Shopping Online

== Products and services ==
PromotionCode.org is a free resource for online shoppers and maintains affiliate partnerships with major retailers such as Target, Wal-Mart, HP and Verizon. The site both originates and disseminates print coupons and online promotion codes. PromotionCode.org maintains a community of shoppers that exchange user-submitted codes and a codes-by-email option where subscribers can receive codes for selected stores via email without having to visit the site.

In 2014, PromotionCode.org released an Android application with over 7,500 users. The app functions similarly to the website, allowing users to search for coupons and deals from both national and local retailers.
