= Edelman Financial Engines =

American financial services company

- Formerly: Edelman Financial Services; Financial Engines
- Type: Private
- Industry: Financial services
- Founded: 1986; 40 years ago
- Headquarters: Santa Clara, California
- Number of locations: 145 (2023)
- Key people: Ralph Haberli (CEO and President)
- AUM: US$270 billion
- Number of employees: 1,500 (2024)
- Website: edelmanfinancialengines.com

Edelman Financial Engines (EFE) is an American financial planning and investment advisory company. As of December 31, 2023, it has more than $270 billion in assets and more than 1.3 million clients. The company was formed by the 2018 merger of Financial Engines (founded in 1996) and Edelman Financial Services (founded in 1986).

== History ==
=== Edelman Financial Services ===
Edelman Financial Services, a financial advisory firm, was founded in 1986 by married couple Jean and Ric Edelman. Sanders Morris Harris Group, a publicly traded wealth management firm, purchased a majority stake of Edelman Financial Services in 2005. Sanders Morris Harris Group changed its name to Edelman Financial Group in March 2011, and Ric Edelman was named co-CEO of the company with George Ball. Private equity firm Hellman & Friedman purchased a controlling stake in Edelman Financial Services in October 2015, at which point the company was managing $15 billion in assets.

=== Financial Engines ===
Financial Engines was founded in 1996 by Nobel Prize-winning economist William Sharpe, Stanford Law professor Joseph Grundfest, and attorney Craig W. Johnson. In 1998, it offered its first retirement planning and fund picking software. The company launched its managed accounts offering to a small number of employers in September 2004. By December 2004, it had $1 billion in assets under management. Financial Engines acquired registered investment advisory firm The Mutual Fund Store for $560 million in 2015. By 2018, the company managed $160 billion in assets and was the largest provider of managed accounts in the defined-contribution market. The company provided 401(k) investment advice managed by a proprietary technology platform with access to human advisers. In 2018, its clients included Comcast NBCUniversal and IBM.

=== Edelman Financial Engines ===
Hellman & Friedman acquired Financial Engines in 2018 for $3 billion and merged it with Edelman Financial Services. The new firm became the largest independent registered investment adviser in the United States, managing $191 billion. Financial Engines CEO Larry Raffone became president and CEO of the combined company, while Ric Edelman was made its chairman of financial and investor education. In November 2018, the merged company announced it would operate under the name Edelman Financial Engines. One objective of the merger was to combine the companies' workplace retirement and financial planning services.

For six consecutive years between 2018 and 2023, Barron's ranked Edelman Financial Engines as the #1 registered financial advisory firm in the United States. Former Department of Labor assistant secretary Phyllis Borzi joined the company's board in November 2018.

As of December 31, 2023, the company managed more than $270 billion in assets for more than 1.3 million clients, mostly in 401(k) plans.

In March 2021, Edelman Financial Engines announced that Warburg Pincus would be taking a minority stake in the company. The transaction represented a valuation of $7.3 billion, a 62% increase in the company's value since its formation in 2018.

In June 2021, Edelman Financial Engines announced that Ric Edelman would step down from his role as chairman of financial education and client experience but stay on as a strategic adviser and board member. He also remains the firm's largest individual shareholder.

In January 2022, Edelman Financial Engines launched Everyday Wealth with Soledad O’Brien and Jean Chatzky, a financial and investment advice podcast hosted by Jean Chatzky and Soledad O’Brien. The weekly episodes covered personal finance, the economy, wealth management, and other financial topics. The podcast ended in early 2024.

== Services ==
Wealth Management - As of January 2020, the company employed 320 financial planners overseeing nearly $40 billion across 92,000 retail clients.

Workplace - This service manages 401(k) accounts for 1.1 million clients across 7,000 companies as of November 2020. The company is the largest provider of managed accounts in the United States, and has more clients than any other independent financial advisor. It also offers Income+, an income service for customers entering or in retirement.

Tax Planning - In May 2021, to create a new internal tax planning division, Edelman acquired Viridian Advisors, a Washington State-based financial firm specializing in tax planning.
