= Bradford Morrow =

American writer (born 1951)

- Born: April 8, 1951 (age 75); Baltimore, Maryland, U.S.
- Education: University of Colorado Boulder (BA)
- Occupation: Novelist
- Writing career
- Notable works: The Prague Sonata, The Forgers, Trinity Fields, Giovanni's Gift
- Movement: Postmodern
- Website: bradfordmorrow.com

Bradford Morrow is an American novelist, editor, essayist, poet, and children's book writer. Professor of literature and Bard Center Fellow at Bard College, he is the founding editor of Conjunctions literary magazine.

== Life ==
Born in Baltimore, Maryland, on April 8, 1951, Morrow grew up in Littleton, Colorado, and, "after a decade of vagabonding from Honduras to France, Italy to England", settled in New York City, where he remains. In 1966, he was selected by the Colorado Medical Association to serve with a small number of other teenage volunteers as a medical assistant with the Amigos de las Americas program, giving inoculations and working with health-care professionals in poor, very rural areas in Honduras. The following year, 1967–1968, Morrow was a foreign exchange student under the auspices of the American Field Service, completing his final year of high school at a Liceo Scientifico in Cuneo, Italy. After completing his B.A. in English Literature at the University of Colorado Boulder, 1969–1972, where he graduated summa cum laude with a Phi Beta Kappa, he received a Danforth Fellowship to continue graduate studies in English and comparative literature at Yale University. Upon leaving Yale, Morrow moved first to Ithaca, New York, where he began research on a full-scale bibliography of Wyndham Lewis, consulting the archives at Cornell University, and then to Santa Barbara, California, where he met John Martin, of Black Sparrow Press, who would publish the bibliography in 1978.

The literary biannual journal Conjunctions was conceived in late 1980 as "Morrow sat in Beat poet Kenneth Rexroth's library in Santa Barbara, California. The two friends had the idea to assemble a Festschrift for James Laughlin, the beloved editor of New Directions." After being published by David R. Godine (1985–1987) and Collier Books/Scribner (1988–1989), the journal was picked up by Bard College in Annandale-on-Hudson, New York, which was the journal's publisher for 33 years. Bard ceased publishing Conjunctions after the Spring 2025 issue.

Morrow became Rexroth's literary executor in 1982, and has edited and introduced a number of the poet's books, including The Selected Poems of Kenneth Rexroth (1984), Classics Revisited (1986), World Outside the Window: Selected Essays of Kenneth Rexroth (1987), More Classics Revisited (1989), and with Sam Hamill coedited The Complete Poems of Kenneth Rexroth (2002).

He has taught at Princeton, Brown, and Columbia Universities, as well as the Naropa Institute. A professor emeritus, from 1990 to 2025 he was a professor of literature and Bard Center Fellow at Bard College.

The Review of Contemporary Fiction published a "Bradford Morrow issue" in 2000, which included essays by Sven Birkerts, Forrest Gander, Patrick McGrath, Robert Creeley, Joanna Scott, Brian Evenson, William T. Vollmann, Maureen Howard and others.

== Works ==
=== Novels ===
- The Forger's Requiem (New York: Grove Atlantic/Atlantic Monthly Press, 2025)
- The Forger's Daughter (New York: Grove Atlantic/Mysterious Press, 2020)
- The Prague Sonata (New York: Atlantic Monthly Press, 2017)
- The Forgers (New York: Grove Atlantic/Mysterious Press, 2014)
- The Diviner's Tale (New York: Houghton Mifflin Harcourt, 2011)
- Ariel’s Crossing (New York: Viking, 2002); Second volume of his "New Mexico Trilogy"
- Giovanni's Gift (New York: Viking, 1997)
- Trinity Fields (New York: Viking, 1995); First volume of his "New Mexico Trilogy," Finalist for the 1995 Los Angeles Times Book Award
- The Almanac Branch (New York: Simon & Schuster, 1991); Finalist for the 1992 PEN/Faulkner Award
- Come Sunday (New York: Weidenfeld & Nicolson, 1988)

=== Short fiction ===
- The Nature of My Inheritance (New York: Mysterious Bookshop, Bibliomystery Series #19, 2014.)
- The Uninnocent (New York: Pegasus, 2011)
- Fall of the Birds (E-book, New York: Open Road Media, 2011, Kindle Single)

=== Illustrated books ===
- Didn’t Didn’t Do It (Illustrated by Gahan Wilson. New York: Putnam, 2007)
- A Bestiary (a book of fables; illustrated by 18 contemporary artists including Gregory Amenoff, Joe Andoe, James Brown, Vija Celmins, Louisa Chase, Eric Fischl, Jan Hashey, Michael Hurson, Mel Kendrick, James Nares, Ellen Phelan, Joel Shapiro, Kiki Smith, David Storey, Michelle Stuart, Richard Tuttle, Trevor Winkfield and Robin Winters. New York: Grenfell Press, 1991)

=== Poetry collections ===
- After a Charme (New York: Grenfell Press, 1984)
- The Preferences (New York: Grenfell Press, 1983)
- Danae's Progress (San Francisco: Cadmus Editions/Arion Press, 1982)
- Posthumes (Santa Barbara: Cadmus Editions, 1982)
- Passing From the Provinces (Santa Barbara: Cadmus Editions, 1981)

=== Works in progress ===
- Meditations on a Shadow, selected essays.

=== Edited books ===
- Conjunctions (Founder and editor. Bi-Annual Volumes of New Writing. Annandale-on-Hudson: Bard College, 1981–2025. Seventy-two volumes to date. Over twenty thousand pages of innovative work by some thousand novelists, poets, playwrights, essayists, and other artists.)
- The Inevitable: Contemporary Writers Confront Death (Co-edited with David Shields. W. W. Norton, 2011)
- The Complete Poems of Kenneth Rexroth. (Co-edited with Sam Hamill. Port Townsend: Copper Canyon, 2002. Los Angeles Times Book of the Year.)
- The New Gothic (Coedited with Patrick McGrath. New York: Random House, 1991)
- More Classics Revisited (by Kenneth Rexroth. Edited and introduction by Bradford Morrow. New York: New Directions, 1989.)
- Thirty Six Poems of Tu Fu (translated by Kenneth Rexroth. Edited and introduction by Bradford Morrow, with afterword by John Yau and etchings by Brice Marden. New York/Zurich: Peter Blum Editions, 1987.)
- The Houses of Children (by Coleman Dowell. Afterword by Bradford Morrow. New York: Weidenfeld & Nicolson, 1988.)
- World outside the Window: Selected Essays of Kenneth Rexroth (Edited and introduction by Bradford Morrow. New York: New Directions, 1987.)
- Classics Revisited (by Kenneth Rexroth. Edited and introduction by Bradford Morrow. New York: New Directions, 1986.)
- The Selected Poems of Kenneth Rexroth (Edited and introduction by Bradford Morrow. New York: New Directions, 1984)

=== Contributions to anthologies ===
- The Big Book of Christmas Mysteries (New York: Vintage, 2013. Edited by Otto Penzler. Includes story The Uninnocent.)
- New Jersey Noir. (Edited by Joyce Carol Oates. New York: Akashic Books, 2011. Includes story The Enigma of Grover's Mill.)
- Best American Noir of the Century. (Eds. James Ellroy and Otto Penzler. New York: Houghton Mifflin Harcourt, 2010. Includes Morrow's The Hoarder.)
- Chronotopes & Dioramas. (Edited by Dominique Gonzalez-Foerster and Karen Kelly. New York: DIA Art Foundation, 2010. Includes essay A Wild Bookery: Nine Reflections.)
- River of Words: Portraits of Hudson Valley Writers. (Edited by Nina Shengold. Photographs by Jennifer May. Albany: Excelsior Editions, State University of New York Press, 2010. Includes essay/interview about Morrow and photographic portrait.)
- Poe’s Children. (Edited by Peter Straub. New York: Doubleday, 2008. Includes short story Gardener of Heart.)
- Paraspheres: Fabulist and New Fabulist Stories. (Edited by Rusty Morrison and Ken Keegan. Richmond: Omnidawn, 2006. Includes short story Gardener of Heart.)
- Murder in the Rough. (Edited by Otto Penzler. New York: Warner Books/Mysterious Press, 2006. Includes short story The Hoarder.)
- The O'Henry Prize Stories, 2003. (New York: Anchor Books, 2003. Edited by Laura Furman. Includes short story Lush.)
- Pushcart Prize XXVII. (Edited by Bill Henderson. Wainscott, New York: Pushcart, 2003. Includes short story Amazing Grace which was also shortlisted for the O'Henry Prize, 2002.)
- A Convergence of Birds. (Edited by Jonathan Safran Foer. New York: Distributed Art Publishers, 2001. Includes Morrow's For Brother Robert.)
- Searching For Your Soul. (Edited by Katherine Kurs. New York: Schocken, 1999. Includes essay Meditations on a Shadow.
- Hover (Anthology of writings by Morrow, Joyce Carol Oates, Rick Moody, Darcy Steincke, with photographs by Gregory Crewdson. San Francisco: Artspace Books, 1998. Includes short story “A Different Kind of Arbor.”)
- The Norton Anthology of Love. (Edited by Diane Ackerman. New York: W.W. Norton, 1997. Includes excerpt from The Almanac Branch.)
- Bomb/Speak: Writers in Conversation. (New York: Gordon & Breech, 1997. Includes interview with Morrow conducted by Jim Lewis, published in Bomb magazine, 1994.)
- The Place Within: Portraits of the American Landscape by Twenty Contemporary Writers. (Edited by Jodi Daynard. New York: Norton, 1997. Includes essay The Journey to Trinity.)
- The Literary Insomniac: Stories and Essays for Sleepless Nights (Eds. Elyse Cheney and Wendy Hubbert. New York: Doubleday, 1996. Includes essay The Night Watch.)
- Communion: Contemporary Writers Reveal the Bible in Their Lives. (Edited by David Rosenberg. New York: Anchor, 1996. Includes essay Meditations on a Shadow.)
- The Future of Fiction: Review of Contemporary Fiction 16.1. Edited by David Foster Wallace. Normal: Dalkey Archive Press, 1996. Includes essay Rivages Roses for Niels Bohr.)
- Blast III. (Edited by Seamus Cooney. Santa Rosa: Black Sparrow Press, 1989. Includes essay *History of an Unapologetic Apologia.)

== Awards and honors ==
- Guggenheim Fellowship (2007)
- PEN/Nora Magid Award for Magazine Editing (2007)
- O. Henry Prize for short story “Lush” (2003)
- Academy Award for Literature, American Academy of Arts and Letters (1998)
- Member, board of trustees, PEN American Center (1998–2002) and chair of the PEN Forums Committee
