= Nancy DeMarinis =

American politician (1930–2020)

Member of the Connecticut House of Representatives from the 40th district
- In office 1993–2003
- Preceded by: Thomas G. Moukawsher
- Succeeded by: Edward Moukawsher

Personal details
- Born: September 11, 1930 Glen Ridge, New Jersey, U.S.
- Died: October 27, 2020 (aged 90) Groton, Connecticut, U.S.
- Party: Democratic
- Spouse: Frederick L. Allen
- Children: 5
- Education: Mohegan Community College; University of Connecticut (BS); Southern Connecticut State University (MS)

Nancy A. DeMarinis (September 11, 1930 – October 27, 2020) was an American politician who served in the Connecticut House of Representatives from 1993 to 2003, representing the 40th district as a Democrat.

== Personal life and education ==
DeMarinis was born on September 11, 1930, in Glen Ridge, New Jersey. She attended the University of Connecticut, where she earned a bachelor's degree, and Southern Connecticut State University, where she earned a master's degree in counseling. She worked as a teacher, a guidance counselor, and a private-practice psychotherapist. She was married to Frederick L. Allen and had five children.

DeMarinis died on October 27, 2020, in Groton, Connecticut. She was 90.

== Political career ==
DeMarinis was elected to the Connecticut House of Representatives in 1992 and served for four terms representing the 40th district as a Democrat. She did not run for reelection in 2002 and was succeeded by fellow Democrat Edward Moukawsher.

In a 1992 interview, while campaigning for the House of Representatives, DeMarinis expressed interest in receiving an endorsement from A Connecticut Party, commenting, "They asked me if I supported the income tax, am pro-choice and am for gay and lesbian rights, which I am".
