= Betsy Gibson =

American politician

Member of the Connecticut House of Representatives from the 40th district
- In office 1981–1985
- Preceded by: Patricia Hendel
- Succeeded by: Philip H. Tuthill

Personal details
- Born: Betsy Barbara Burghardt; 1945 or 1946
- Party: Democratic
- Spouse: Owen A. Gibson

Betsy Barbara Gibson (née Burghardt; born 1945 or 1946) is an American politician who served in the Connecticut House of Representatives from 1981 to 1985, representing the 40th district as a Democrat. She lived in Groton during her tenure.
