= Stephen Fried =

American journalist

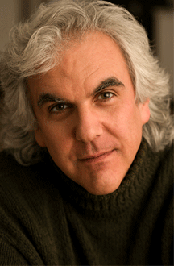
- Born: Stephen Marc Fried; January 19, 1958 (age 68); Harrisburg, Pennsylvania, United States
- Occupations: Investigative journalist, non-fiction writer
- Writing career
- Period: 1975–present
- Notable works: Thing of Beauty: The Tragedy of Supermodel Gia (1993); Bitter Pills: Inside the Hazardous World of Legal Drugs (1998); The New Rabbi (2002); Husbandry: Sex, Love & Dirty Laundry—Inside the Minds of Married Men (2007); Appetite for America: How Visionary Businessman Fred Harvey Built a Railroad Hospitality Empire That Civilized the Wild West (2010); Rush: Revolution, Madness, and Benjamin Rush, the Visionary Doctor Who Became a Founding Father (2018)
- Notable awards: National Magazine Award; Vidocq Society Medal of Honor; National Headliner Award

Stephen Fried is an American investigative journalist, non-fiction author, and lecturer who teaches at Columbia University and the University of Pennsylvania. His first book, Thing of Beauty: The Tragedy of Supermodel Gia (Pocket), a biography of model Gia Carangi and her era, was published in 1993. He has since written Bitter Pills: Inside the Hazardous World of Legal Drugs (Bantam 1998), an investigation of medication safety and the pharmaceutical-industrial complex; The New Rabbi (Bantam 2002), which weaves the dramatic search for a new religious leader at one of the nation's most influential houses of worship with a meditation on the author's Jewish upbringing; Husbandry (Bantam 2007), a collection of essays on marriage and men; Appetite for America: Fred Harvey and the Business of Civilizing the Wild West—One Meal at a Time (Bantam 2010), the bestselling biography of restaurant and hotel entrepreneur Fred Harvey; and RUSH: Revolution, Madness & the Visionary Doctor Who Became a Founding Father (Crown 2018). In 2015, he co-authored the New York Times bestseller A Common Struggle: A Personal Journey Through the Past and Future of Mental Illness and Addiction (Blue Rider 2015) and Profiles in Mental Health Courage (Dutton 2024) with former Congressman and mental health advocate Patrick J. Kennedy.

Fried is also an award-winning writer, a two-time recipient of the National Magazine Award, and has written for Vanity Fair, GQ, Rolling Stone, Glamour, Smithsonian, Parade, Ladies' Home Journal and Philadelphia magazine, where he was also editor-in-chief in 1999 and 2000. He lives in Philadelphia with his wife, author Diane Ayres.

== Early life and education ==
Fried was born and grew up in Harrisburg, Pennsylvania. As a child, he attended Pinemere Camp in the Pocono Mountains. He enrolled in the University of Pennsylvania in 1975, where he wrote for and co-edited 34th Street, the university's weekly magazine. While in college, he also became part of a small network of future journalists, authors and editors taught and nurtured by Nora Magid, a Canadian-born editor and professor whom Fried has referred to as a "one-woman journalism school." The self-dubbed "Nora-ites"—whose ranks include writers and editors Eliot Kaplan, Jean Chatzky, Randall Lane, David Borgenicht, Stefan Fatsis, Joe Siegel, Lisa DePaulo, Miriam Around, and Sandee Brawarsky—created a mentorship prize in Magid's name in 2003. Fried eulogized Magid eleven years earlier in a piece for Philadelphia magazine, in which he shared experiences from her first-ever Advanced Expository Writing class in 1977. He graduated with a B.A. in International Relations from the University of Pennsylvania in 1979.

== Books ==
Fried published his first book, a biography of high-fashion model and AIDS victim Gia Carangi, in 1993. Titled Thing of Beauty: The Tragedy of Supermodel Gia, the book grew out of a lengthy Philadelphia magazine piece and was reviewed positively in The New York Times and The Boston Globe upon its release. Fried's book was optioned by Paramount but was also used as the basis for the 1998 HBO film Gia, which went on to win an Emmy Award and two Golden Globe Awards, including one for Angelina Jolie in the title role. Fried is also credited with having invented the word "fashionista" for Thing of Beauty, which he used as shorthand for anyone involved in the creation and manufacturing of high fashion. His name appears in the Oxford English Dictionary entry for the word.

In 1998, Fried published his second book, Bitter Pills: Inside the Hazardous World of Legal Drugs. An outgrowth of his award-winning Philadelphia magazine piece "Less Than One Percent," prompted by his wife's serious adverse reaction to one pill of a new antibiotic, the book investigated prescription drug manufacturers, the safety of their products and FDA regulation (or lack thereof). The New York Times Book Review called it "the best popular book on the subject," the American Journalism Review named Bitter Pills one of the fifteen best books in the genre of investigative reporting, and The San Diego Union-Tribune said the book "could save your life." It was also a finalist for the Investigative Reporters and Editors book prize, was named one of the best books of the year by The Philadelphia Inquirer and Men's Health, and was featured on The Oprah Winfrey Show and Dateline.

His third book, 2002's The New Rabbi, combined several years of reporting on the effort to choose a new spiritual leader at Philadelphia's influential Har Zion Temple with Fried's own spiritual search after the death of his father. The book, initially controversial among some clergy, went on to receive very favorable reviews from The New York Times, The Washington Post Book World and The Philadelphia Inquirer, which called it "brave...remarkable...a book about leadership you don't have to be Jewish to appreciate." It was also named one of the ten best spiritual books of the year by Beliefnet, and is used as a seminary textbook and read by congregations preparing to choose new leaders. His following book, Husbandry: Sex, Love & Dirty Laundry—Inside the Minds of Married Men, was a collection of 31 essays about men and relationships, originally written for his Ladies' Home Journal column "Heart of a Husband."

Fried's fifth book, titled Appetite for America: How Visionary Businessman Fred Harvey Built a Railroad Hospitality Empire That Civilized the Wild West, was published in March 2010. The product of five years of cross-country research, the book is the first-ever full-length biography of restaurant and hotel mogul Fred Harvey, his innovative family business, the Harvey Girls, the Santa Fe railway, and the America they helped create. The book draws on newly discovered datebooks and letters of Fred Harvey and his son, Ford (who actually ran the company much longer than his father), which had been in family hands for decades. In support of the book, Fried embarked upon a train tour along the old Santa Fe route from Chicago to Los Angeles, visiting many of the classic mid- and southwestern cities where Harvey establishments thrived from the late 19th century well into the 20th. He was also interviewed by Melissa Block of NPR's All Things Considered, and the book won accolades from The New York Times and The Wall Street Journal upon its release — the second of which complimented Fried's "crisp prose and delightful detail" and praised the book as "sweeping social history populated with memorable characters." The Wall Street Journal also named the book one of its Ten Best of the Year for 2010. It earned the same honor from The Philadelphia Inquirer, was named one of the ten best business books by Amazon.com and won the Athenaeum of Philadelphia Literary Award, a prize given to Philadelphia-area writers since 1949, for non-fiction. The book has helped fuel a renaissance of interest in Harvey, the Harvey Girls and the company’s historic hotels, several of which have been in constant use (El Tovar at the Grand Canyon, La Fonda in Santa Fe) and others that have been restored (including La Posada in Winslow, AZ and, most recently, Castaneda Hotel in Las Vegas, NM) Since its publication, Fried has been invited to lecture at museums and universities across the country about the book. He now oversees the annual Fred Harvey History Weekend each fall at the New Mexico History Museum in Santa Fe, highlighted by the Fred Harvey Foodie Dinner & Auction.

His sixth book, co-authored with former Patrick J. Kennedy, was A Common Struggle: A Personal Journey Through the Past and Future of Mental Illness and Addiction, published in September, 2015. It was an overnight New York Times bestseller, was featured on “60 Minutes” and included as appendices a complete political agenda for the future of American mental health and addiction care. In its aftermath, Fried wrote a cover story for The Forward about how faith communities can help change the lives of people with mental illness and addiction, and their families. He now does “Brain Health & Faith” presentations across the country.

Fried’s seventh book, RUSH: Revolution, Madness & the Visionary Doctor Who Became a Founding Father was published in September 2018. A finalist for the George Washington Book Prize, RUSH was also named an American Library Association Notable Book of the Year, and was an inaugural selection for the DAR Library Book Club. It was featured on CBS This Morning and NPR’s “Morning Edition” The New Yorker called it “entertaining...Benjamin Rush has been undeservedly forgotten. In medicine ... [and] as a political thinker, he was brilliant.” The Philadelphia Inquirer said it was “superb” and “reminds us eloquently, abundantly, what a brilliant, original man Benjamin Rush was, and how his contributions to ... the United States continue to bless us all.”

His eighth book, co-authored with Patrick J. Kennedy, is Profiles in Mental Health Courage was published in April 2024 by Dutton.

Fried is currently writing a biography of controversial early twentieth century business and political hero William Gibbs McAdoo, the progressive New York entrepreneur who dug the first tunnels under the Hudson River (now the PATH system), was the landmark Secretary of the Treasury during WWI, co-founded United Artists Studios with Charlie Chaplin, almost became President of the United States (twice), and later was an influential U.S. Senator from California during the New Deal.

== Career in journalism ==
Fried first became known as a writer for Philadelphia, where he began in 1982, worked full-time until 1989 and remained for another decade as a contract writer and editorial consultant. During that time he was also a contributing writer and music columnist at GQ from 1987 to 1991, a contributing writer at Vanity Fair from 1994 to 1997, a contributing editor at Glamour from 1996 to 1998, and a regular contributor to The Washington Post Magazine, Rolling Stone and others. In 1999, he began a two-year stint as the editor-in-chief of Philadelphia, after which he returned to writing and editorial consulting. He also began teaching and lecturing about the subjects of his books and articles. He returned to Glamour as a contributing editor from 2001 to 2008, was a contributing writer and columnist at Ladies Home Journal from 2003 to 2008, returned to Philadelphia Magazine as a writer-at-large in 2011, and has since freelanced for Smithsonian magazine, Deseret Magazine and a variety of other publications.

In 2002, he began teaching narrative nonfiction magazine writing as an adjunct professor at Columbia University Graduate School of Journalism; in 2008, he also joined the adjunct faculty at Penn as a lecturer in the Center for Programs in Contemporary Writing. He taught Magazine Writing Workshop B at Columbia J-school from 2003-2015, and then oversaw masters’ projects until 2019, after which he began teaching selected Columbia physicians and staff, initially in the Department of Psychiatry. In the spring of 2020, he was hired by Columbia Medical School’s landmark Narrative Medicine department to create a journalism workshop for Columbia clinicians and trainees who wanted to learn to write narratively and journalistically for the general public. The Narrative Medicine Journalism Workshop he started is now supported by the Robert Wood Johnson Foundation, and its members—most of whom had never published outside of medical journals—have now had pieces published in the New York Times, Washington Post, The New Yorker, and Vice among other publications.

Fried's best-known magazine piece is "Cradle to Grave", the April 1998 Philadelphia cover story that led the biggest maternal homicide case in history to be reopened and solved. In it, he investigated the family tragedy of Art and Marie Noe, a Philadelphia-area couple who lost ten infant children from 1949 through 1968 to undetermined causes. Fried explored whether the Noes might have been responsible for those deaths, and his investigation led the Philadelphia homicide unit — which had officially closed the Noe file three decades earlier — to begin reexamining the deaths. One day after his story ran, the police interrogated Mr. and Mrs. Noe and received a confession from Marie that she had suffocated eight of her own children (two died of natural causes), leading to a guilty plea and a controversial sentence — which was to include house arrest and probation, along with her cooperation in an unprecedented analysis of her medical history and actions by top experts in fields that study post-partum violence (an analysis which was never carried out). For his work on the Noe case, Fried became the first journalist to receive the Medal of Honor from the Vidocq Society, an elite international group of criminologists, pathologists and police investigators. The piece was also part of his winning entry for the 1999 National Headliners Award for Outstanding Feature Writing, won a Clarion Award from national Women in Communications, and was a finalist for the National Magazine Award for Reporting.

Among his earlier notable magazine stories are "Over the Edge" (Philadelphia, October 1984), an investigation of a series of teen suicides in a small town in Bucks County, which won a Clarion Award and was a finalist for the Livingston Award, and "Boy Crazy" (Philadelphia, November 1987), about a homosexual pedophile police chief in a community nearby to Philadelphia, which won the national Sigma Delta Chi/Society of Professional Journalists award for Magazine Reporting. His January 1989 Philadelphia story "The Three Mrs. Lymans", about the battle over the estate of singer Frankie Lymon, inspired the Warner Brothers film Why Do Fools Fall in Love.

In 1993 he won his first National Magazine Award in the field of Special Interest as one of the writers on a Philadelphia feature about the simple pleasures of life in and around the city. Fried's contribution, an essay on returning to fishing after many years' absence, was later expanded into a 1995 Philadelphia feature called "Reeling in the Years", which was selected as a notable story of the year in Best American Sports Stories.

The next year, Fried won his second National Magazine Award in the field of Public Interest Reporting for a series of three stories in Philadelphia on the prescription drug Floxin. The first piece in the series, titled "Less than One Percent" (April 1993), chronicled his wife's adverse reaction to a single dose of Floxin and examined the FDA's regulatory process for prescription drugs. Parts two and three called for (and later prompted) tougher FDA rules on antibiotic drugs.

Fried went on to publish three award-winning pieces about mental health care. "War of Remembrance" (Philadelphia, January 1994), was the first in-depth investigative treatment of the "false memory syndrome" and the Freyds family of Philadelphia, who invented and popularized it. It won a Health Journalism Gold Award and is generally credited with leveling the playing field in the contentious debate over false memory syndrome's validity. His Washington Post Magazine cover story "Creative Tension" (April 16, 1995) was the first major national profile of Johns Hopkins psychologist Dr. Kay Redfield Jamison, and the first time she "came out" as having manic-depressive illness – the disease she had devoted her life to researching and treating (laying the groundwork for her bestselling memoir, An Unquiet Mind). "Creative Tension" won a 1995 Easter Seals Equality, Dignity and Independence Award for enhancing the image of people with disabilities, as did Fried's Philadelphia story the same month, "The Incredible Shrinking Institute", about the rise and fall of the nation's first psychiatric institution (and the birthplace of the American Psychiatric Association). In 1999, his final year as a writer at Philadelphia magazine, he received the National Headliner Award for Feature Writing on a Variety of Subjects for his investigation of the Noes as well as "Family Business" (September 1998), the first in-depth story about the family that had built – and was in the process of slowly destroying – the Rite Aid drugstore chain.

While Fried was editor-in-chief at Philadelphia, the magazine was a National Magazine Award finalist for Feature Writing and Profiles in 2000. The same year, it won the Clarion Award for Best Magazine in Philadelphia's circulation category as well as the award for Most Improved Magazine, and Philadelphia earned gold medals from the City and Regional Magazine Association for General Excellence and Excellence in Writing. Since returning to magazine and book writing, he won the Epilepsy Foundation's Distinguished Journalism Award for "How Far Would You Go To Save Your Health?" (Glamour, August 2004), which followed for a year the case of a young woman having a temporal lobectomy — an extreme surgical procedure — as a last resort to stop treatment-resistant seizures.

From 2018 until 2021, Fried did weekly interviews in Philadelphia with Dr. Aaron Beck, the founder of Cognitive Behavioral Therapy, who was approaching 100 years of age but still working. After Beck’s death in October 2021, their time together was captured in a long magazine piece “Tim Beck’s Final Brainstorms” in the Pennsylvania Gazette and a possible book project.

== Books ==
- Thing of Beauty: The Tragedy of Supermodel Gia (1993)
- Bitter Pills: Inside the Hazardous World of Legal Drugs (1998)
- The New Rabbi (2002)
- Husbandry: Sex, Love & Dirty Laundry—Inside the Minds of Married Men (2007)
- Appetite for America: How Visionary Businessman Fred Harvey Built a Railroad Hospitality Empire That Civilized the Wild West (2010)
- A Common Struggle: A Personal Journey Through the Past and Future of Mental Illness and Addiction by Patrick Kennedy and Stephen Fried (2015)
- Rush: Revolution, Madness, and Benjamin Rush, the Visionary Doctor Who Became a Founding Father (2018)
- Profiles in Mental Health Courage by Patrick J. Kennedy and Stephen Fried (2024)
