= Jean Chatzky =

American journalist (born 1964)

Jean Sherman Chatzky
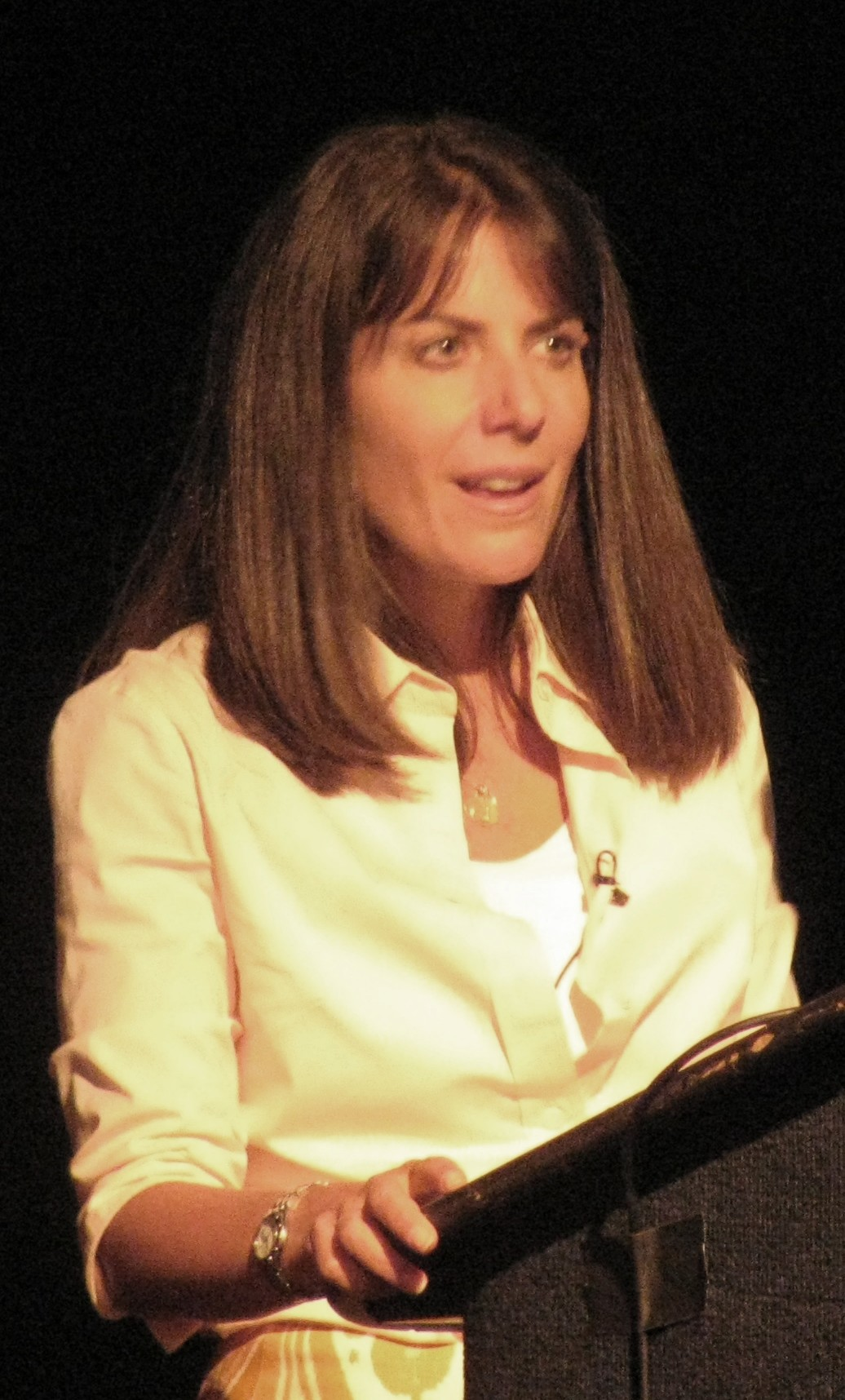
- Chatzky in 2009
- Born: September 7, 1964 (age 62); Michigan
- Education: University of Pennsylvania
- Occupations: Journalist, Author, Motivational Speaker
- Spouse: Peter Chatzky (divorced) Eliot Kaplan (m. 2009)
- Website: hermoney.com

Jean Sherman Chatzky (born September 7, 1964) is an American journalist, a personal finance columnist, financial editor of NBC's TODAY show, AARP's personal finance ambassador, and the founder and CEO of the multimedia company HerMoney.

== Early life and education ==
Born in Michigan and raised in Wisconsin, Indiana and West Virginia, Chatzky holds a BA in English from the University of Pennsylvania. Her father was a college professor. Her family is Jewish.

== Career ==
Starting her career in 1986 at Working Woman, Chatzky rose from editorial assistant to the assistant editor. In 1989 she left journalism and joined the equity research department of Dean Witter Reynolds, returning to journalism two years later as a reporter/researcher at Forbes. She moved to the Dow Jones/Hearst start-up SmartMoney in 1992, rising from staff writer to senior editor. After a five-year run, Chatzky joined Money Magazine in 1998.

Chatzky has appeared on Oprah, Live With Regis and Kelly, The View and other programs. She has written for Parents, Seventeen, Cosmopolitan, was a staff writer for SmartMoney and a fact checker for Forbes.

Chatzky is also the financial editor for NBC's Today Show. Jean also maintains a daily blog on her website. In 2011 Chatzky became the director of education and editor in chief for the financial advice site SavvyMoney.com.

In 2018, she launched HerMoney, a multimedia company changing the relationships women have with money — inspired by her weekly podcast, HerMoney with Jean Chatzky.

Chatzky is a best-selling author. Her 2017 book with Michael F. Roizen AgeProof: Living Longer Without Running Out of Money or Breaking a Hip, became a New York Times and Wall Street Journal bestseller. Her book Women with Money: The Judgment-Free Guide to Creating the Joyful, Less Stressed, Purposeful (and, Yes, Rich) Life You Deserve was published by Grand Central Publishing in March 2019.

In early 2015, Chatzky and the division of Time Inc., Time for Kids, launched a magazine called Your $ to teach financial literacy to fourth, fifth, and sixth graders. The PwC Charitable Foundation provided financial support for the magazine, which had the goal of reaching 2 million American students. In January 2022, Chatzky and journalist Soledad O'Brien began hosting Everyday Wealth with Soledad O'Brien and Jean Chatzky, a weekly radio program and podcast on personal finance. It is sponsored by Edelman Financial Engines.

== Personal life ==
In May 2009, Chatzky married magazine executive Eliot Kaplan in Irvington, New York. She supports various service groups, and is on the advisory committee for the annual University of Pennsylvania Nora Magid Mentorship Prize, established in 2003 by investigative journalist Stephen Fried and her husband. The prize is given to a senior who shows exceptional ability and promise in writing, reporting, or editing. She is also on the Communications Committee for the University of Pennsylvania.

She is a resident of Briarcliff Manor, New York, where her former husband Peter Chatzky served as mayor.

She is the mother of Jake "Jets Jake" Chatzky of New Heights podcast fame.

== Books ==
- The Difference: How Anyone Can Prosper in Even The Toughest Times (March 2009)
- Make Money, Not Excuses (March 2008)
- Pay It Down: From Debt to Wealth on $10 A Day (January 2006). ISBN 978-1-59184-063-3
- The Ten Commandments of Financial Happiness (January 2005)
- Talking Money (January 2001)
- Not Your Parents' Money Book: Making, Saving and Spending Your Own Money (August 2010)
- Money rules: the simple path to lifelong security (2012). ISBN 978-1-60961-860-5

== Awards and recognition ==
Chatzky received the Clarion Award for magazine columns from the Association for Women in Communications in 2002, and her radio show received a Gracie Award from the American Women in Radio and Television in 2012. She has also been nominated twice as part of a three-person writing team each time for National Magazine Awards in Personal Service, and was named one of the best magazine columnists in the country by the Chicago Tribune in 2003 for her writing in Money. In 2009, the Consumer Federation of America awarded Chatzky the Betty Furness Consumer Media Service Award for her nearly two decades of pioneering personal finance education.
