= Bradford P. Campbell =

American government official

Bradford P. Campbell is an American lawyer who served as the Assistant Secretary for Employee Benefits Security of the United States Department of Labor (DOL), leading the Employee Benefits Security Administration (EBSA). Campbell was nominated by President George W. Bush as Assistant Secretary on May 3, 2007, and was unanimously confirmed by the United States Senate on August 3, 2007. He held the position until January 20, 2009. Prior to his confirmation as Assistant Secretary, Campbell had served as Acting Assistant Secretary since October 30, 2006 and as EBSA's Deputy Assistant Secretary for Policy since March 5, 2004.

As the Assistant Secretary of Labor for Employee Benefits, Campbell oversaw more than 700,000 covered retirement plans, approximately 2.5 million covered health plans, and similar numbers of other welfare benefit plans, such as those providing life or disability insurance, offered by private employers in the United States. The employee benefit plans under EBSA’s jurisdiction at the time held about $6.1 trillion in assets and covered approximately 150 million Americans. As Assistant Secretary, Campbell was the primary Federal regulatory and enforcement official for Title I of the Employee Retirement Income Security Act of 1974 (ERISA). Campbell reflected on his service in a Spring 2009 interview with InBrief, a publication of Center for Tax Law and Employee Benefits at the John Marshall Law School.

Following his service as Assistant Secretary, Campbell joined the national law firm Schiff Hardin LLP on September 16, 2009. As a nationally recognized figure on employer-sponsored retirement, health and other welfare benefit plans, he provides his clients with insight and knowledge across a broad range of ERISA-plan related issues. Campbell concentrates his practice in employee benefits, executive compensation and ERISA litigation, specializing in ERISA Title I issues, including fiduciary conduct and prohibited transactions.

Campbell serves on the Advisory Board for the John Marshall Law School (Chicago)'s Graduate Employee Benefits Programs. Prior to joining EBSA, Campbell was Senior Legislative Officer at the Department of Labor. Prior to joining the Department of Labor, Campbell served as Legislative Director for then-Congressman Ernest Fletcher and as Senior Legislative Assistant to former Congressman and SEC Chairman, Christopher Cox. Campbell received his A.B. from Harvard University, and his J.D., cum laude, from the Georgetown University Law Center.
