= Employee Benefits Security Administration =

U.S. government agency under the Department of Labor

Agency overview
- Formed: 1970
- Jurisdiction: Federal government of the United States
- Headquarters: Washington, D.C.
- Employees: 1,000
- Agency executive: Daniel Aronowitz, Assistant Secretary of Labor for Employee Benefits Security
- Website: www.dol.gov/agencies/ebsa

The Employee Benefits Security Administration (EBSA) is an agency of the United States Department of Labor responsible for administering, regulating and enforcing the provisions of Title I of the Employee Retirement Income Security Act of 1974 (ERISA). At the time of its name change in February 2003, EBSA was known as the Pension and Welfare Benefits Administration (PWBA). Prior to January 1986, PWBA was known as the Pension and Welfare Benefits Program. Originally the Program was established as an Office within the Labor Management Services Administration reporting the then Assistant Secretary Paul Fasser and his successors from 1974 through 1986.

== Leadership ==
EBSA is led by the Assistant Secretary of Labor for Employee Benefits Security, a Sub-Cabinet-level position requiring nomination by the President of the United States and confirmation by the United States Senate. The office was last held by Lisa Gomez, who was sworn in as Assistant Secretary on October 11, 2022. Gomez vacated her seat in January 2025, and the installation of a new Assistant Secretary is pending before the Trump administration.

The previous Assistant Secretary of Labor for Employee Benefits Security and head of the Employee Benefits Security Administration was Preston Rutledge. Past Assistant Secretaries include Phyllis Borzi, Bradford P. Campbell, Ann L. Combs, and Olena Berg-Lacy.

== Organization ==
EBSA is organized into nine program offices:

- Exemption Determination (OED) - Processes requests for individual and class exemptions from ERISA’s prohibited transaction provisions.
- Enforcement (OE) - Conducts EBSA's national and field enforcement program.
- Policy and Research (OPR) - Provides policy analysis, economic research, and tracking of all benefits policy-related developments and activities.
- Health Plan Standards and Compliance Assistance (OHPSCA) - Provides regulations and interpretive guidance related to health plans and provides education, technical assistance and other support to health plans, other government agencies with related responsibilities, policy makers and Employee Benefits Security Administration program offices on health care matters.
- Regulations and Interpretations (ORI) - Primarily responsible for carrying out EBSA’s regulatory agenda and interpretive activities, as well as the development, analysis and implementation of pension and health care policy issues by providing technical assistance and support to the Assistant Secretary, external groups and other offices within EBSA.
- The Chief Accountant (OCA) - Responsible for annual reporting and audit requirements by employee benefit plans, and enforcement of those provisions through the imposition of civil penalties against a plan administrator whose annual report is rejected.
- Technology and Information Services (OTIS) - Provides computer office automation, information processing, and local wide area, and Internet connectivity for EBSA staff nationwide.
- Participant Assistance (OPA) - Provides participant and compliance assistance directly to the public through a staff of Benefits Advisors, located in EBSA’s field offices, who answer inquiries and complaints received by phone, mail, electronically or in person. OPA coordinates the development of the Agency’s Strategic Plan for Outreach, Education and Assistance, establishes policies and operating procedures for the program, provides oversight and support to the Regional Offices in carrying out these activities, and oversees quality reviews and customer satisfaction surveys related to the program.
- Program Planning - Provides advice and leadership in the development and implementation of EBSA's policy, strategic planning and evaluation, financial management, budgeting, human resources and administrative programs designed to assure effective management of Agency operations and resources.

EBSA also maintains 13 regional and district field offices throughout the US to conduct investigations to detect and correct violations of Title I of ERISA and related criminal laws, and answer inquiries and complaints received by phone, mail, electronically or in person.

== See also ==
- Title 29 of the Code of Federal Regulations
- Pension Rights Center
