= Lisa DePaulo =

American journalist, magazine writer

- Born: Lisa DePaulo; 1961 (age 64–65); Scranton, Pennsylvania
- Education: University of Pennsylvania (1982)
- Occupations: Journalist, correspondent, adjunct instructor

Lisa DePaulo (born January 1961) is an American journalist, feature magazine writer, correspondent and editor whose articles have appeared in The New York Times, George, Elle, New York Magazine, Vanity Fair, GQ, Harper's Bazaar and Philadelphia magazine, among others.

== Early life and education ==
DePaulo was born in Scranton, Pennsylvania to Joseph and Josephine DePaulo, one of four children. At Dunmore High School, from where she graduated in 1978, she received a Breslin journalism award for her reporting for the school newspaper. She graduated with a journalism degree from the University of Pennsylvania in 1982 and then went to work as a writer for Philadelphia Magazine, where she interned during college, ultimately writing for the magazine for more than 10 years.

== Career ==
She left Philadelphia in January 1998 after John F. Kennedy Jr., editor and co-founder of George magazine, offered her a full-time writing position at his magazine, where she stayed until the publication folded in 2001, two years after JFK Jr.'s death. DePaulo continued writing feature stories for national magazines. After 23 years living and working in New York City, she returned to Philadelphia in 2021.

DePaulo sits on the advisory committee for the annual Nora Magid Mentorship Prize at The University of Philadelphia.

She taught writing part-time at New York University's Graduate Journalism School.

=== Writings ===
DePaulo wrote an article for The Hollywood Reporter on the 20th anniversary of JFK Jr.'s death, which included interviews from former George magazine staff writers, editors and celebrities.

She traveled on assignment to Iraq, where she interviewed General David Petraeus.

For years, DePaulo covered real estate heir Robert Durst's lengthy investigation into the murder of Durst's decades-long friend and mafia daughter Susan Berman and the eventual trial, at which Durst was convicted in September 2021. DePaulo began writing about Durst when her editors at New York Magazine assigned her to cover Durst soon after Berman's December 2000 murder. DePaulo temporarily halted writing about Durst before she testified for the prosecution because of information she gleaned during interviews with Durst and Berman's family and friends.

A story by DePaulo about a paralegal named Julia Law, found dead in the bathtub of her boss and lover, prominent Philadelphia defense attorney Chuck Peruto, was released in 2013 as a true crime ebook by Philadelphia Magazine.

== Appearances ==
In 2010, she appeared on "Hardball With Chris Matthews," on MSNBC to discuss DePaulo's interview with Rielle Hunter, the woman who had an affair and a child with former Presidential candidate John Edwards. The interview was published in GQ magazine.

She appeared on "Larry King Live" in 2002 to talk about the Chandra Levy missing person case.

=== The Jinx, Part Two Documentary ===
DePaulo appeared in the documentary The Jinx: Part Two, released on HBO Max in April 2024, and talked about Durst and his sense of entitlement that contributed to his crimes. He acted as if, "I'm Bob Durst. I can do whatever I want," DePaulo told the BBC in an article about the documentary. "And I think there was part of him that wanted to get caught... and when he did get caught, he thought he would beat the system."

=== Lawsuit ===
In 2015, DePaulo signed a work-for-hire agreement with Jeanine Pirro, a TV personality and former Westchester County prosecutor, to write a book for the Simon and Schuster publishing house about then-accused killer Robert Durst for Berman's murder. But, according to a lawsuit filed against Pirro, DePaulo said that Pirro had "little regard for truth and accuracy" as Pirro directed the writer to "describe events and circumstances that never occurred and to aggrandize" Pirro's "role in the story at the expense of the truth." Pirro terminated the collaboration and did not make a second $37,500 payment to DePaulo, as per the agreement. The case went to arbitration but failed to settle.

DePaulo noted that Pirro forced her to perform menial tasks and tried to include material in the book that she knew to be untrue. Pirro eventually went on to complete her book, titled He Killed Them All: Robert Durst and My Quest for Justice, with another collaborator, releasing it in November 2015.

== Bibliography ==
=== eBook ===
- The Dead Girl in the Bathtub (AIN B00ESWXY8G)
