= Thomas G. Moukawsher =

American judge (born 1962)

Thomas Moukawsher

Judge of the Connecticut Superior Court
- In office March 6, 2013 – 2023
- Appointed by: Dannel Malloy

Member of the Connecticut House of Representatives from the 40th district
- In office 1991–1993
- Preceded by: Jay B. Levin
- Succeeded by: Nancy DeMarinis

Personal details
- Born: 1962 (age 63–64) New London, Connecticut, U.S.
- Relatives: Edward Moukawsher (brother)
- Education: University of Connecticut (JD)
- Website: thomasmoukawsher.com

Thomas Moukawsher (born 1962) is a former American politician, judge, legal scholar, and legal writer. From 2013 to 2023, he served as a judge of the Connecticut Superior Court.

== Early life and education ==
Moukawsher was born in 1962 in New London, Connecticut. He attended The Citadel Military College, where he served as a member of the school's honor court. In 1983, he graduated with high honors after attending The Citadel for three years. Moukawsher then attended the University of Connecticut School of Law, where he served on the board of the Connecticut Law Review and the Connecticut Moot Court Board, graduating with honors in 1986. He is the brother of fellow politician Edward Moukawsher.

== Career ==
During law school, Moukawsher served a year in the office of Connecticut Governor William A. O'Neill as an intern and a paid law clerk. In 1985, he became a lobbyist for the Connecticut Bankers Association, serving until he was elected to the Connecticut General Assembly in 1990. Prior to his election to the state legislature, Moukawsher was elected to two terms on the Town Council of Groton, Connecticut. After losing a state senate race in 1992, Moukawsher became special counsel to Connecticut Senate president pro tempore John B. Larson, whom he served there and as an outside counsel after Larson's election to Congress in 1998, including during his tenure as chair of the House Democratic Caucus during the 111th and 112th United States Congress. Moukawsher served for eighteen years on the Democratic State Central Committee of Connecticut and also served two terms as counsel to the Democratic Party of Connecticut.

Moukawsher's law practice ultimately focused on federal-court fiduciary litigation under the Employee Retirement Income Security Act of 1974 (ERISA). From 1991 to 2013, he litigated pension fraud and fiduciary litigation on behalf of plans and plan participants in thirteen U.S. District Courts and seven United States Courts of Appeals. His victories included a win before an eleven-member en banc panel of the San Francisco, California-based Ninth Circuit Court of Appeals in Bins v. Exxon and as co-counsel to a class that won a landmark favorable ruling from the United States Supreme Court in 2011 in CIGNA v. Amara.

In practice, Moukawsher was a regular lecturer on ERISA litigation. He served as co-chair of the American Bar Association's Committee on Employee Benefits and as a co-author and editor of its book, Employee Benefit Law. He served as a fellow of the American College of Employee Benefit Counsel. He is a sustaining life fellow of the American Bar Foundation.

== Judgeship ==
Moukawsher was nominated to be a judge of the Connecticut Superior Court in 2013 by Governor Dannel P. Malloy. He assumed office on March 6, 2013, and served for a year in the Court's Criminal Division as the presiding judge of an experimental drug crimes docket in Danielson, Connecticut. Moukawsher ultimately presided over criminal, civil, housing, and family cases before his transfer to the Hartford Judicial District in 2015.

For eight of his ten years on the bench Moukawsher has presided over complex litigation. From 2015 to 2021, Moukawsher was a complex civil litigation judge in Hartford, Connecticut.

In 2016, he was the author of a nationally quoted decision on a challenge to the constitutional adequacy of the Connecticut education system in CCJEF v. Rell. Moukawsher held the system was adequately funded, but held that state policies concerning the distribution of aid, the evaluation of teachers, and special education were all deficient under the Connecticut Constitutional provision guaranteeing all students a free public education. Moukawsher labelled the state's high school graduation standard "a sugar-cube boat. It dissolves before it's half launched." He was described by the New York Times as a "New England judge with a Southerner's flair for metaphor," saying that he "criticized 'uselessly perfect teacher evaluations' as part of a rating system 'that is little more than cotton candy in a rainstorm.'" The New Yorker described Moukawsher's case as a "smartly written, sometimes sardonic, and unusually pointed ninety page opinion." In 2018, by a 4–3 vote, the Connecticut Supreme Court upheld Moukawsher's first ruling about funding levels and overturned the second ruling on policy inadequacies, leaving state policies unchanged.

In 2019, in City of New Haven v. Purdue Pharma he controversially dismissed claims by cities and towns suing opioid manufacturers during the opioid epidemic in the United States, holding that US states and victims had a right to sue while local government costs "are a long radius and many concentric circles away from the simple observation that promoting more addiction creates more addicts." "[Putting precise numbers" on damages...would be..."junk justice"... The decision won praise in two Wall Street Journal editorials for “rebuking the trial bar and grasping politicians.”

The decision was appealed but the appeal was mooted by bankruptcies and settlements.

In 2021 amidst the COVID-19 pandemic, Moukawsher decided a constitutional challenge to Connecticut Governor Ned Lamont's assumption of emergency powers in CT Freedom Alliance v. Lamont. After a review of historical exercises of emergency powers, Moukawsher agreed with the state that a bona fide emergency existed but held that the doctrine of separation of powers meant that the power required time limits on its exercise, ratification by the General Assembly of past decrees, and the establishment of a system for the General Assembly to overturn gubernatorial decrees. An appeal of the ruling was later dismissed as moot. Following the decision, the Connecticut General Assembly adopted provisions addressing each of the decision's major points.

In September 2021, Moukawsher was appointed the presiding judge of the Regional Family Trial Docket, a statewide docket for the trial of complex family cases. In 2021 the state faced an enormous backlog of family cases in the wake of the COVID-19 shutdown. Moukawsher has written that court credibility turns on expeditious handling of cases and rulings that litigants can easily read and understand. The Connecticut Law Tribune said of Moukawsher's decision, "Judge Thomas Moukawsher's decision on mandated masks in Connecticut schools illustrates in clear and engaging prose, the historic and current importance of the separation of powers... By explaining the reasoning, history and context behind his ruling in an easy-to-understand language, the judge did the public - the sovereign, if you will - a favor. In that sense, this was an opinion fit for a king."

Moukawsher has been praised for his writing and creative thinking on the bench in the New York Times, The New Yorker, the Wall Street Journal, and elsewhere.

== Writing and commentary ==
In 2023, Brandeis University Press published Moukawsher's book, The Common Flaw: Needless Complexity in the Courts and 50 Ways to Reduce It. The book critiques modern litigation and judicial practices and proposes fifty innovations to bring greater efficiency to court proceedings and greater public respect for the courts. Since publication of The Common Flaw, Moukawsher has become a regular commentator on legal issues for national news sources with his work appearing in publications including Newsweek, CNN, USA Today, Salon, and the Hill.
