= Connecticut's 40th House of Representatives district =

American legislative district

Connecticut's 40th State House of Representatives district
Representative
Dan Gaiewski; D

Connecticut's 40th House of Representatives district elects one member of the Connecticut House of Representatives. It encompasses parts of Groton and Ledyard. It has been represented by Democrat Dan Gaiewski since 2025.

== List of representatives ==
List of representatives from Connecticut's 40th State House district
Representative	Party	Years	District home	Note
William S. Mayer	Republican	1967–1971	East Granby	Seat created
Astrid Hanzalek	Republican	1971–1973	Suffield	
James H. McGill	Republican	1973–1975	Groton	
Patricia Hendel	Democratic	1975–1981	New London	
Betsy Gibson	Democratic	1981–1985	Groton	
Philip H. Tuthill	Republican	1985–1987	Groton	
Jay B. Levin	Democratic	1987–1991	New London	
Thomas Moukawsher	Democratic	1991–1993	Groton	
Nancy DeMarinis	Democratic	1993–2003	Groton	
Edward Moukawsher	Democratic	2003–2015	Groton	
John F. Scott	Republican	2015–2017	Mystic	
Christine Conley	Democratic	2017–2025	Groton	Resigned
Dan Gaiewski	Democratic	2025–	Groton	Elected in special election

== Recent elections ==
=== 2026 ===
2026 Connecticut State House of Representatives election, District 40
Party	Candidate	Votes	%
Democratic	Dan Gaiewski (Incumbent)	TBD	TBD
Republican	Isabelle Roode	TBD	TBD
	Total Votes	TBD	TBD
Result: TBD	Winner: TBD	TBD	TBD

=== 2025 Special Election ===
2025 Connecticut State House of Representatives special election, District 40
Party	Candidate	Votes	%
Democratic	Dan Gaiewski	1,518	66.03
Republican	Robert Boris	716	31.1
Working Families	Dan Gaiewski	65	2.83
	Total Votes	2,299	100.0
Democratic Hold	Winner: Dan Gaiewski	1,583	68.9

=== 2024 ===
2024 Connecticut State House of Representatives election, District 40
Party	Candidate	Votes	%
Democratic	Christine Conley (Incumbent)	5,682	60.7
Republican	Susan Deane-Shinbrot	3,167	33.8
Working Families	Christine Conley (Incumbent)	284	3.0
Independent Party	Christine Conley (Incumbent)	229	2.5
	Total Votes	9,362	100.0
Democratic Hold	Winner: Christine Conley (Incumbent)	6,195	66.2

=== 2022 ===
2022 Connecticut State House of Representatives election, District 40
Party	Candidate	Votes	%
Democratic	Christine Conley (Incumbent)	3,929	74.72
Republican	Scott Westervelt (Withdrew)	0	0
Working Families	Christine Conley (Incumbent)	407	7.74
Independent Party	Lauren Gauthier	922	17.5
	Total Votes	5,258	100.00
Democratic Hold	Winner: Christine Conley (Incumbent)	4,336	82.46

=== 2020 ===
2020 Connecticut State House of Representatives election, District 40
Party	Candidate	Votes	%
Democratic	Christine Conley (incumbent)	5,011	56.15
Republican	Lauren Gauthier	3,454	38.70
Working Families	Christine Conley (incumbent)	242	2.71
Independent Party	Lauren Gauthier	217	2.43
Total votes		8,924	100.00
Democratic hold			

=== 2018 ===
2018 Connecticut House of Representatives election, District 40
Party	Candidate	Votes	%
Democratic	Christine Conley (Incumbent)	3,815	58.4
Republican	John Scott	2,720	41.6
Total votes		6,535	100.00
Democratic hold			

=== 2016 ===
2016 Connecticut House of Representatives election, District 40
Party	Candidate	Votes	%
Democratic	Christine Conley	4,078	54.25
Republican	John Scott (Incumbent)	3,439	45.75
Total votes		7,517	100.00
Democratic hold			

=== 2014 ===
2014 Connecticut House of Representatives election, District 40
Party	Candidate	Votes	%
Republican	John F. Scott	2,572	56.6
Democratic	Edward Moukawsher (Incumbent)	1,969	43.4
Total votes		4,541	100.00
Republican hold			

=== 2012 ===
2012 Connecticut House of Representatives election, District 40
Party	Candidate	Votes	%
Democratic	Edward Moukawsher (Incumbent)	3,427	54.00
Republican	Andrew Lavery	2,923	46.00
Total votes		6,350	100.00
Democratic hold			
