= NFTY =

Reform Jewish youth organization

NFTY: The Reform Jewish Youth Movement
- The NFTY logo
- Abbreviation: NFTY
- Formation: 1939
- Type: Youth Organization
- Purpose: Religious
- Headquarters: New York City, New York, U.S.
- Location: 633 Third Avenue, 7th Floor New York City, NY 10017, U.S.
- Region served: North America
- Members: 8,500
- President: Lillian Spratt
- Parent organization: Union for Reform Judaism
- Affiliations: Reform Judaism Netzer Olami (snif)
- Website: nfty.org

The North American Federation for Temple Youth or NFTY, formerly known as the National Federation for Temple Youth, is an organized youth movement of Reform Judaism in North America (also known as The Reform Jewish Youth Movement). Funded and supported by the Union for Reform Judaism (URJ), NFTY supplements Reform youth groups at the synagogue level.

== History ==
Founded on January 15, 1939, by the Union of American Hebrew Congregations (now called the Union for Reform Judaism), the then-titled National Federation of Temple Youth was a program to encourage college students to engage in synagogue life. NFTY was originally focused in just three regions - New York City, Chicago, and Pennsylvania, but it soon expanded to all areas of the UAHC. The first national officers were Richard Bluestein (president), Bernard Sang (first vice-president), Lewis Held (second vice-president), Daniel Miller (third vice-president), and Lenore Cohn (secretary.) The executive committee of NFTY met in June 1939 in New York and discussed college activities, publications and social justice, while also confirming cooperation with the UAHC as an affiliate and to cooperate with the National Conference for Community and Justice in interfaith work.

Rabbi Sam Cook organized one of the first regional Labor Day Conclaves of the Union of American Hebrew Congregations (UAHC) Pennsylvania State Federation, held at Pinemere Camp in 1939. The February 1940 convention in Chicago featured former President Herbert Hoover as keynote speaker. National conventions continued every two years until 1948 and the organization began to focus on High School aged students.

In the 1950s, NFTY began to focus on social action and mitzvah themes. Local, regional, and national social action efforts were commonplace on issues ranging from the releases of Russian Jews to the fight against poverty to hunger. Mitzvah Corps groups were established in many regions.

In 1952, NFTY began Jewish summer camping in the newly purchased facility in Oconomowoc, Wisconsin, later called the Olin-Sang-Ruby Union Institute Camp (or OSRUI). In 1964, the Kutz Camp in Warwick, New York, became NFTY's North American leadership camp and the site of North American board meetings. UAHC and the Jewish camping movement had a significant impact on American Reform Judaism development.

In 1961, NFTY began Israel programming with the URJ Heller High School (formerly Eisendrath International Exchange) semester in Israel. Trips to Europe, mitzvah trips to locations such as Puerto Rico and Mexico, and archaeological digs have also been sponsored by NFTY in recent decades.

From 1962 to 1965, NFTY focused on innovation in international programming. The NFTY Summer Antiquities Tour brought NFTYites to see the sights and meet the Jewish youth of Europe and Israel. The NFTY Bible Institute provided a thorough touring experience in Israel. Mitzvah Corps programs sprung up in Puerto Rico, Israel, and Mexico, as well as in New York and Chicago. Today, almost every NFTY Region has a Mitzvah Corps Program.

In 1965, NFTY the URJ Kutz Camp in Warwick, NY opened as their summer location. Beginning that summer, Kutz became the site for NFTY's Leadership Institutes, Board Meetings, and other national programs. It continues to be the headquarters for NFTY Leadership Training.

In 1983, NFTY reintroduced the NFTY Convention in Washington, D.C. Every other year on President's Day weekend, hundreds to thousands of Reform Jewish teenagers gather for study, prayer, music, and socializing in a major North American city. A youth advisor's professional training conference was added to run concurrently in 1999 with a youth clergy track added in 2001. Convention typically alternates between the East and West coast.

In February 2005, the biennial NFTY Convention in Los Angeles formalized NFTY’s role as the North American branch of Netzer Olami, the global Progressive Zionist youth movement.

In 2020, the URJ sold the property that Kutz Camp operated on to the town of Warwick, New York.

In 2014, about 750 local youth groups were affiliated, representing over 8,500 members.

Past NFTY members and leadership can be found as numerous rabbis, cantors, educators, social workers, synagogue leaders, and active Reform Jews across the world.

== Mission ==
Throughout the 2014–2015 NFTY year, the Regional Presidents Network drafted a new mission statement to reflect the cohesive values, aspirations, and goals of the North American Federation of Temple Youth. This mission statement was formally adopted by the NFTY Board, General Board, and adult leadership after being presented at the 2015 NFTY Convention in Atlanta. The mission statement reads as follows:

- NFTY is a movement that builds strong, welcoming, inspired communities through teen-powered engagement. Together, we pursue Tikkun Olam, personal growth, youth empowerment, and deep connections, all rooted in Reform Judaism.

== Structure ==
NFTY is divided into three levels: Temple Youth Group (TYG), Regional, and North American. At each level, authority is divided between elected youth boards and supervisors employed by the URJ or local synagogue. Boards vary widely between youth groups and regions, but typically include positions such as: President, Programming Vice-President, Social Action Vice-President, Religious & Cultural Vice-President, Membership Vice-President, Communications Vice-President, Treasurer, and Secretary.

=== TYG Level ===
TYGs, or Temple Youth Groups, are individual youth groups affiliated with Reform congregations and are the foundation of NFTY. TYGs are youth-run and offer participants educational, social, action, and religious programs. Most TYGs have a youth group board and an adult advisor appointed by the congregation. The youth group advisor or director is sometimes a volunteer in the congregation, a parent, a part-time staff person, or, in a small, but increasing number of synagogues, a full-time position. While the board structure is at the direction of each group, most are modeled after the regional or North American board.

=== Regions ===
NFTY is divided into nineteen regions which hold events to bring together different TYGs based on geographical distribution. For example, NFTY-STR (Southern Tropical Region), the most populous region, includes around 30 TYGs and over 600 members.

As of 2004 regions include:

- NFTY-CAR: Chicago Area Region
- NFTY-CWR: Central West Region

Northern California, Nevada, Hawaii, and Utah.

- NFTY-GER: Garden-Empire Region

Northern and Central New Jersey and parts of downstate New York.^{[3]}

- NFTY-MAR: Mid Atlantic Region

Maryland, the District of Columbia, Virginia, eastern West Virginia and parts of Northern North Carolina.

- NFTY-MI: Michigan
- NFTY-MV: Missouri Valley: Illinois (except Chicago), Missouri, Iowa, Kansas, Nebraska, Colorado, and Wyoming.
- NFTY-NAR: the New York metropolitan area, including New York City, Westchester, Long Island, Fairfield County, and Connecticut, as well as Puerto Rico, and the US Virgin Islands ^{[2]}
- NFTY-NE: Northeast

Massachusetts, Connecticut, Vermont, New Hampshire, Rhode Island, Maine, northeastern New York, and parts of Canada.^{[3]}

- NFTY-NEL: Northeast Lakes

Around the Great Lakes (both in the US and Canada) including parts of the states of Ohio, Pennsylvania, New York, and all of Ontario, Canada.^{[3]}

- NFTY-NO: Northern

Minnesota, Wisconsin, Rockford, Illinois, North and South Dakota, Saskatchewan, Manitoba

- NFTY-NW: Northwest

It is physically the largest region, spanning Alaska, Alberta, British Columbia, Idaho, Montana, Oregon and Washington.

- NFTY-OV: Ohio Valley

Indiana, Ohio, Tennessee, Kentucky, West Virginia

- NFTY-PAR: Pennsylvania Area Region

Pennsylvania (excluding Erie, PA), Southern NJ, Delaware, and parts of West Virginia.

- NFTY-SAR: Southern Area Region

North Florida, Georgia, South Carolina, Charlotte, NC, and Chattanooga, TN ^{[1]}

- NFTY-SO: Southern

Arkansas, Alabama, Louisiana, Mississippi, Western Tennessee and the Florida Panhandle.

- NFTY-SoCal: Southern California

From Atascadero to San Diego

- NFTY-STR: Southern Tropical Region

All of Florida outside of the panhandle, except Pensacola and the Bahamas ^{[1]}

- NFTY-SW: Southwest

Las Vegas, Arizona, New Mexico, El Paso

- NFTY-TOR: Texas-Oklahoma Region

Texas and Oklahoma

^{[1]} Until 2001, NFTY-SAR and NFTY-STR comprised one region, known as NFTY-SER (formerly known as SEFTY). The regions still work together to run certain social action projects.

^{[2]} Until 2003/2004 NFTY-NAR (New York Area Region) comprised three regions, NFTY-NYC (New York City, formerly known as CRaFTY), NFTY-LI (Long Island, formerly known as LIFTY), and NFTY-W/F (Westchester/Fairfield and parts of Connecticut, formerly known as WooFTY).

^{[3]} NFTY-Central New York (formerly known as CNFTY) existed until 1995. In that year, the Central New York region, which included synagogues along the Hudson Valley from Rockland County, New York, north to Albany and west to Syracuse, New York, was split among the Northeast region, the Northeast Lakes region, and the Garden Empire region (formerly known as JFTY).

== NFTY Board (North American Board) ==
The NFTY board is elected each year to establish general policy and themes for the organization as a whole, as well as lead the various leadership networks. The board members are typically recent high school graduates, although there are occasional exceptions to this trend.^{[a]}

Board Members 2020-Present
Term	President	Programming VP	Social Action VP	Religious & Cultural VP	Engagement & Recruitment VP^{[d][g]}	Communications VP	Development VP^{[e]}
2026-2027	Cade Crane	Natalia Rossen	Max Zhiss	-	Violet Jonas	Aleah Rosenberg	Josephine Varon
2025-2026	Lillian Spratt	Mira Krain	-	-	Mischa Dolgin	Maddie Rothstein (elected as Marketing VP)	Josh Cooper
2024-2025	Benji Rosenblum	Frogby Sachs	Shayna Levy	Mads Barenboim	Mali Cooper	Sara Borek	Zoe Babione (elected as Fellowships & Immersives VP)
2023-2024^{[f]}	Henry Barron	Barak Landis, Lainey Weissman, Espi Reynolds, Ezra Frohlich, Nadine Katz					
2022-2023	Noa Apple	Aiden D'Antonio	Daniella Abbott	Simon Warner	Cameron Samuels	Arianna "Ari" Walker	Evan Jaffe
2021-2022	Lev Mosbacher	Sam Goldstone	Madeline "Maddy" Denker	Owen Thomas	Riley Genevieve Miner	Jacob "Fishy" Fishman	
2020-2021	Fletcher Block	Josh Rosenblum	Liana Friedman	Madison Rosenfield	Catherine "Cat" Orange	Hannah Finkelstein	

Board Members 2010-2020
Term	President	Programming VP	Social Action VP	Religious & Cultural VP	Membership VP^{[c]}	Communications VP^{[c]}
2019-2020	Maya Levy	Hannah Bender	Jessica Becker	Brandon Morantz	Jacob Forstein	Maya Levy
2018-2019	Lila Greene	Marissa Klass	Zoe Terner	Garrett Layton	Ione Heigham	Zenobia "Nobie" Fried
2017-2018	Zachary Herrmann	Max Zucker	Adam Friedman	Eliza Lieberman	William Saltzburg	Asher Suloway-Baker
2016-2017	Kathryn Fleisher	Jordan Iserson	Shelby Shoup	Kathryn Fleisher	Andrew Oestricher	Deni Budman
2015-2016	Jeremy Cronig	Alexa "Lexi" Chavin	Taylor Gleeson	Celia Tedde	Joey Penn	Aly Silverberg
2014-2015	Deborah Rabinovich	Scott Rubenstein	Olivia Kessler	Max Spivak	Talia Capozzoli	Jacob Maier
2013-2014	Andrew Keene	Morgan Weidner	Gordon Kaye	Micah Friedman	Aaron Heft	
2012-2013	Evan Traylor	Jordan Rodnizki	Joy Nemerson	Jacob Georginow	Marlee Ribnick	
2011-2012	Forrest Yesnes	Liza Moskowitz	Avra Bossov	Austin Zoot	Taylor Lyles	
2010-2011	Daniel Landesberg	Julia Carpey	Molly Goldberg	Rio Cheyenne Blue	Aly Pavela	

Board Members 2000-2010
Term	President	Programming VP	Social Action VP	Religious & Cultural VP	Membership & Communications VP^{[b]}
2009-2010	Aliza Gazek	Tyler Benjamin	Sophie Vener	Josh Levin	Alyssa Kress
2008-2009	Jessica Goodman	Noah Wolf-Prusan	Michelle Cravez	Elaina Marshalek	Zach Bronstein
2007-2008	Zachary Newburgh	Benjamin Judah Phelps	Mookie Kideckel	Joshua Morris, Ivy Cohen	Jeremy Carlson, Emily Harry
2006-2007	Dean Carson	Benjamin Levine	Aaron Arbiter	Mark Swick	Seth Gordon-Lipkin
2005-2006	Andy Shoenig	Sarah Ruben	Jordyn Jacobs	Nina Loftspring	Elyse Greenberg
2004-2005	Daniel Zadoff	David Silverstein	Mira Lyon	Jeremy Gimbel	Justin Felder
2003-2004	Allison Tatarsky	Adam Roe	Dana Tarley	Matt Reber	Adrienne Levy
2002-2003	Chad Rochkind	Will Dempster	Matt Berns	David Ladon	Debra Eichenbaum
2001-2002	Ashley Habas	Becky Frank	Anna Avery	Jesse Friedman	
2000-2001	Sean Thibault	Becky Elias	Rachel Van Thyn	Marc Zeiger-Guerra	

Board Members 1990-2000
Term	President	Programming VP	Social Action VP	Religious & Cultural VP
1999-2000	Jeremy Rosenberg	Melanie Ross	Ryan Roman	Helayne Hashmall
1998-1999	Juliesue Thorner	Jessica Olean	Randi Levine	Michael Simon
1997-1998	Matt Kunofsky	Ilana Chernow	Nicole Scaglione	Stephanie Leifer
1996-1997	Jacob Zlotoff	Betsy Walter	Asher Knight	Adam Hollander
1995-1996	Rinat Manhoff	Tamar Anitai	Eric Magnus	Marla Swartz
1994-1995	Abby Holland	Jenn Siegel	Scott Lyons	Lauren Grabelle
1993-1994	Jeff Berger	Karen Reiser	David Kaley	Anthony Scaglione
1992-1993	Brigitte Senson	Mimi Cotton	Michael Friedman	Ari Gauss
1991-1992	Jonathan Crane	Joui Hessel	Aaron Gauss	Marc Sternberg
1990-1991	Deborah Sternberg	David Widzer	Aaron Gross	

^{[a]} A list of past NFTY Board members from 1939-2014 was archived on a previous version of the NFTY website.

^{[b]} In 5762 (2002) Debra Eichenbaum was elected the first North American Membership & Communications Vice President.

^{[c]} In 5774 (2014), the position of Membership & Communications Vice President was split into Membership Vice President and Communications Vice President.

^{[d]} In 5782 (2022) the position of Membership Vice President was renamed Engagement and Inclusion Vice President.

^{[e]} In 5782 (2022) the position of Development Vice President was created by the North American Board.

^{[f]} In 5783 (2023) there were no non-President individual positions. For the 2023-2024 year members of the Board were known as members of the North American Leadership Team.

^{[g]} In 5786 (2026) the position of Engagement and Inclusion Vice President was renamed Engagement and Recruitment Vice President.

== Youth safety ==
In 2021, an article by New Voices investigated how safe participants in US Jewish youth groups, including NFTY, were from sexual harassment and assault. Lev Mosbacher, president of NFTY at the time, issued a statement NFTY Remains Committed To Creating A Safe and Accepting Community describing past and ongoing work by NFTY to enhance youth safety from sexual harassment and violence. The statement referred to a 2017 Resolution Affirming NFTY's Stance on Preventing Sexual Violence.
