= Christine Conley =

American politician (born 1982)

Member of the Connecticut House of Representatives from the 40th district
- In office January 4, 2017 – January 7, 2025
- Preceded by: John F. Scott
- Succeeded by: Dan Gaiewski

Personal details
- Born: February 4, 1982 (age 44)
- Party: Democratic
- Education: Bay Path University (BS); Western New England University (JD)

Christine Conley (born February 4, 1982) is an American politician who served in the Connecticut House of Representatives from the 40th district from 2017 to 2025.
