= Conjunctions (journal) =

- Discipline: Literary journal
- Language: English
- Edited by: Bradford Morrow

Publication details
- History: 1981–present
- Publisher: Bard College (United States)
- Frequency: Biannual

Standard abbreviations
- ISO 4: Conjunctions

Indexing
- ISSN: 0278-2324

Links
- Journal homepage

Conjunctions is a biannual American literary journal founded in 1981 by Bradford Morrow, who continues to edit the journal. In 1991, Bard College became the journal's publisher and remained so until July 2026, when Morrow once again took over publishing responsibilities by establishing The Conjunctions Foundation Inc of which he is the president. Morrow received the PEN/Nora Magid Award for Magazine Editing in 2007. Conjunctions has been the recipient of numerous awards and honors, including the Whiting Foundation Prize for Literary Magazines, and work from its pages is frequently honored with prizes such as the Pushcart Prize, the O. Henry Award, and the PEN/Robert J. Dau Short Story Prize for Emerging Writers.

The journal publishes innovative fiction, poetry, criticism, drama, art and interviews by both emerging and established writers. It provides a forum for nearly 1,000 writers and artists "whose work challenges accepted forms and modes of expression, experiments with language and thought, and is fully realized art", according to the "Letter from the Editor" on its website. It aims to maintain consistently high editorial and production quality with the intention of attracting a large and varied audience. The project is meant to present a wide variety of individual voices. The publication is unusually thick, often containing about 400 pages per issue.

Conjunctions' editorial approach is often collaborative. Both the editor and the distinguished staff of active contributing editors — including Walter Abish, John Ashbery, Mei-mei Berssenbrugge, Mary Caponegro, Elizabeth Frank, William H. Gass, Peter Gizzi, Jorie Graham, Robert Kelly, Ann Lauterbach, W.S. Merwin, Rick Moody, Joanna Scott, Brian Evenson, Karen Russell, Brandon Hobson, John Edgar Wideman, and more — rely on the advice of fellow writers across the country. Final selection of the material is made by the editor.

The journal's issue 80 is themed Ways of Water.

== Awards ==
- Rick Moody's essay, "Notes on Lazarus," appeared in The Best American Essays 2018.
- Richard Powers' short story, "Modulation," appeared in The Best American Short Stories 2009.
- Joyce Carol Oates' short story, "Dear Husband," appeared in The Best American Mystery Stories 2009.
- Kelly Link's short story, "Stone Animals," appeared in The Best American Short Stories 2005.
- Rachel Blau DuPlessis's poem, "Draft 55:Quiptych", appeared in The Best American Poetry 2004.
- David Foster Wallace's short story, "Good Old Neon", appeared in The O. Henry Prize Stories 2002.
- Mei-mei Berssenbrugge's poem, "Chinese Space," appeared in The Best American Poetry 1998.

Conjunctions has also received more Pushcart Prizes than any other literary publication in recent years with the exception of Ploughshares.

== See also ==
- List of literary magazines
