= Pinemere Camp =

Jewish summer camp in Pennsylvania

Coordinates: 41°00′03″N 75°19′31″W

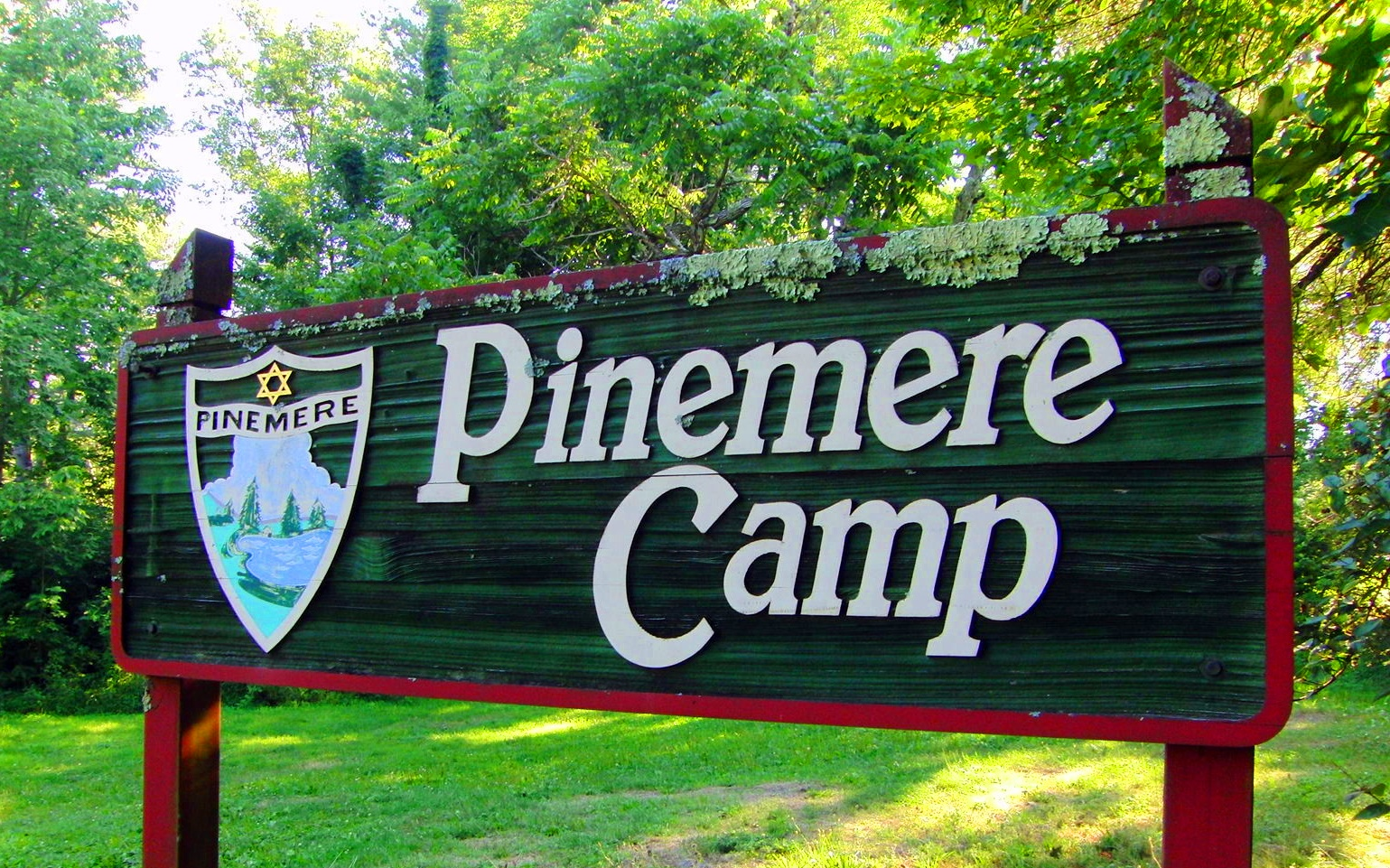

- Location within Pennsylvania
- Location: 865 Bartonsville Woods Road, Stroudsburg, Pennsylvania 18360
- Operated by: Jewish Community Center
- Owner: Pinemere Camp Association
- Established: 1942 (83–84 years ago)
- Website: pinemere.com

Pinemere Camp is a Jewish overnight summer camp for children in grades 2–10. Its 300 campers are primarily drawn from the United States.

Pinemere is located in a mountain setting, with cabins and a lake. It is on Bartonsville Woods Road, Stroudsburg, on Stoney Run in the Pocono Mountains in Northeastern Pennsylvania. The camp is 2 miles (3.2 km) from the Camelback Mountain Resort, and about 45 miles (72 km) north of Allentown, Pennsylvania. The camp grounds are 180 acres (4,050 square meters).

Pinemere's name refers to the reflection of its pine trees upon its lake. The camp was officially established in 1942.

== History ==
=== 1930s–1957 ===
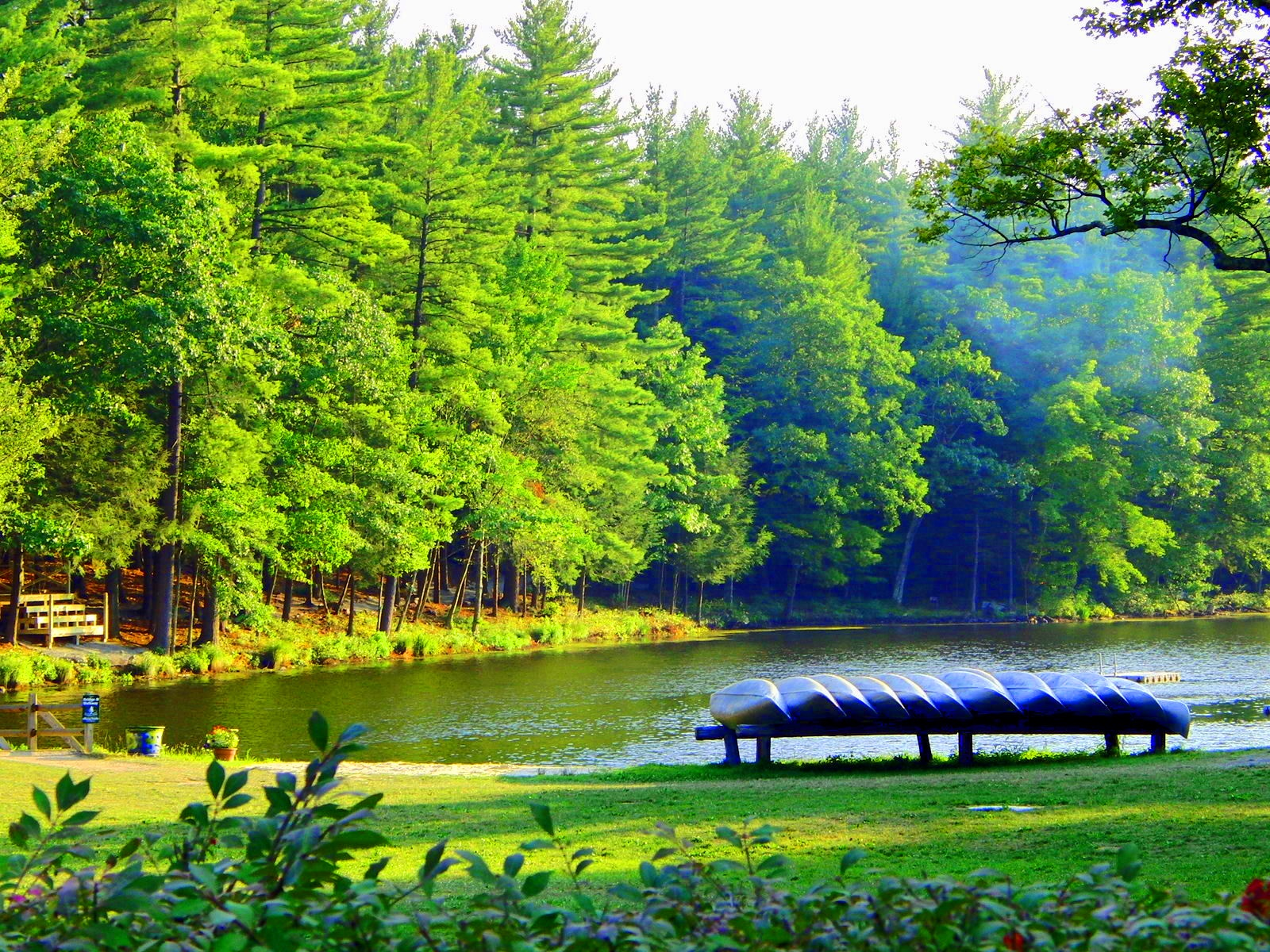
Pinemere Camp

Pinemere Camp began operations in the 1930s. A lake for swimming and boating was built. Originally, it was a girls-only camp.

Mrs. Cohen then purchased the property from the McCluskey family and Joseph Nye. Shortly after the official establishment in 1939 of the North American Federation of Temple Youth (NFTY), the organized youth movement of Reform Judaism in North America, Rabbi Sam Cook organized what may have been the first regional Labor Day Conclave for the Union of American Hebrew Congregations (UAHC) Pennsylvania State Federation at Pinemere.

Subsequently, the Philadelphia Jewish Welfare Board purchased the camp. Pinemere Camp was officially established in 1942 by the Jewish Welfare Board (which subsequently became the Jewish Community Center Association (JCCA)) to provide a resident camp experience for Jewish children in the Mid-Atlantic region of the United States. It focused especially on providing a camp experience to children from smaller communities that did not have a synagogue. At that point, it became co-ed. In the late 1940s, John Bernheimer, a prominent Philadelphia attorney, served on its board of directors. American interior designer and former daytime television host Nate Berkus's grandparents met at the camp, where his grandfather was the water sports director.

=== 1958–99 ===
From 1958 to 1999, Robert H. Miner was Pinemere Camp's director, leading more than 15,000 campers and young counselors. In 1980, it formed the Pinemere Alumni Association. In 1988, it dedicated its new Pinemere Indoor Facility.

In 1991, Stephen H. Holden, a Cherry Hill, New Jersey, attorney, was elected president of the Pinemere Camp Association. In 1995, the camp had 205 campers. Starting in the mid-1990s, some of its buildings were used as accommodation for ski groups, including those of other faiths.

=== 2000–present ===
In 2000, Aaron Selkow became the camp's Executive Director; he held that position until 2008. In 2008, 18 campers who attended Pinemere did so with a grant from the Overnight Camp Incentive Program, a program designed to attract new campers to Jewish identity-building camps. It is a joint project of the Philadelphia-based Neubauer Family Foundation, the Foundation for Jewish Camp, and the Jewish Federation of Greater Philadelphia. The program provided grants for campers in amounts ranging from $750 to $1,250. The majority of the Pinemere campers who received grants chose to return the following summer.

That same summer, the camp began an environmental education program. Activities include gardening and repurposing discarded items into new items.

In 2008, Toby Ayash became executive director; a position she held for five years. Pinemere began offering three-day sports clinics in basketball, tennis, baseball, softball, football, soccer, golf, horseback riding, lacrosse, field hockey, and wilderness survival. It brought in the full-time Athletic Director of the Pocono Mountain East High School so campers could work on sports drills. The clinics are taught by professional coaches; the golf clinic is taught by a PGA-certified coach, and the one-day basketball clinic known as the Sixers Summer Hoops Tour is run by the Philadelphia 76ers, with visits by 76ers legends.

In 2010, the camp began to offer an abbreviated option of a one-week mini-session, with 5 rising third-graders. By June 2012, 42 campers had signed up.

In the summer of 2012, two dozen Jewish teenagers from Germany attended Pinemere Camp in an arrangement with the Zentralrat der Juden in Deutschland (the Central Council of Jews in Germany), the umbrella organization of Germany’s Jewish communities. In December 2012, two dozen American Pinemere campers joined their German counterparts in the ski village of Fürstenhof in Natz in the Italian Alps.

In 2013 Mitch Morgan was hired as Executive Director, and successfully led Pinemere for 8 years. In 2021 Eytan Graubart was hired as Executive Director.

Pinemere Camp has 250-300 campers and 100-150 staff every session. About half of the campers are from the Philadelphia area, and the rest come from communities all around North America. In addition to many former campers, Pinemere’s staff includes a large delegation from Israel and representatives from around the world.

== Today ==
Pinemere Camp has campers from the ages of 6 to 16. The camp attracts children who both do and do not attend Hebrew school or synagogue, and some campers who attend Hebrew day schools.

Pinemere offers boating, canoeing, pioneering, dramatics, arts and crafts, team sports, archery, and tennis. The camp offers sports clinics in basketball, baseball, softball, football, soccer, tennis, golf, horseback riding, lacrosse, and field hockey.

All meals at the camp are kosher, and the camp observes shabbat. The camp also offers gluten-free food for campers with celiac disease and other options for various dietary needs.

Pinemere offers campers the options of various sessions: either a one-, three-, four-, or seven-week session. It also offers a 3-day "SPARK weekend," so first-time campers can try it out.

The camp is owned by Pinemere Camp Association. It is affiliated with JCC Association of North America.

=== Staff ===
The camp's Interim Executive Director is Aaron Singer. Pinemere’s Director of Camp Experience is Linz Etter Haft. Pinemere’s Director of Finance and Operations is Jeremy Ferman.

== Notable persons ==
=== Campers ===
- Diane Ackerman, author, poet, and naturalist; her first summer at the camp was in 1961
- Stephen Fried, investigative journalist, non-fiction author, essayist, and adjunct professor at the Columbia University Graduate School of Journalism
- Toby Lightman, singer-songwriter attended Pinemere in the 90's and was a CIT at Pinemere in 1994.
