= Clara Jeffery =

American editor and essayist (born 1967)

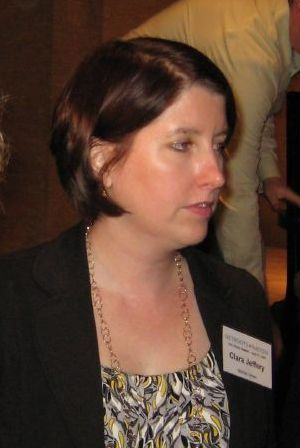
- Jeffery in 2009
- Born: August 25, 1967 (age 59); Baltimore, Maryland, U.S.
- Education: Carleton College (BA); Northwestern University (MA)
- Occupations: Editor, essayist
- Writing career
- Genre: Non-fiction

Clara Jeffery (born August 25, 1967) is an American journalist. She has been editor-in-chief of Mother Jones since 2006. When the magazine merged in 2024 with The Center for Investigative Reporting, Jeffery was named editor-in-chief of the combined organization. She is a recipient of a PEN award for magazine editing.

== Career ==
Jeffery was born in Baltimore, Maryland, and was raised in Arlington, Virginia, and attended the Sidwell Friends School (1985), before going to Carleton College (1989). She earned a master's degree from the Medill School of Journalism at Northwestern University in 1993.

Between 1993 and 1995, Jeffery was a staff editor and writer at Washington City Paper. She was a senior editor at Harper's Magazine (1995–2002), where she edited six articles nominated for a National Magazine Award, including essays by Barbara Ehrenreich that became Nickel and Dimed. While at Harper's, Jeffery also contributed occasional articles.

In 2002, she was hired as deputy editor of Mother Jones, a position she held for four years before being promoted in August 2006 to co-editor-in-chief, along with Monika Bauerlein. In May 2015, Jeffery became sole editor-in-chief and Bauerlein was named CEO.

In their joint leadership at Mother Jones, Jeffery and Bauerlein aimed to put greater emphasis on staff-generated, daily news and original reporting. The magazine received a National Magazine Award for General Excellence in 2008, 2010, and 2025, and in 2017, it won magazine of the year. In 2025, its collaboration with the Center for Public Integrity and Reveal, "40 Acres and A Lie," was selected as a Pulitzer Prize finalist in the explanatory reporting category. In 2012, Mother Jones broke the story about Mitt Romney's "47 percent" remarks, which were controversial prior to Barack Obama winning reelection. In 2013, Jeffery and Bauerlein were co-recipients of the PEN award for magazine editing. In 2019, they received the I.F. Stone Medal for Journalistic Independence.

Besides her work for Harper's and Mother Jones, Jeffery has also written articles and essays for Slate, the Huffington Post, San Francisco magazine, and the Chicago Reporter.
