= Dan Gaiewski =

American politician

Member of the Connecticut House of Representatives from the 40th district
- Incumbent
- Assumed office February 28, 2025
- Preceded by: Christine Conley

Personal details
- Born: c. 2000 (age c. 26)
- Party: Democratic

Dan Gaiewski (born c. 2000) is an American politician who has been the member for the 40th district in the Connecticut House of Representatives since 2025. He is a member of the Democratic Party.

Gaiewski grew up in Groton, Connecticut and went to Fitch High School. He ran Track & Field and was part of jazz band.

Gaiewski attended Franklin and Marshall College and ran Cross Country and Track & Field. There, he ran personal records of 4:57 in the mile and 17:01 for the 5k. From 2023 to 2024, he was the assistant Track and Field coach at Wesleyan University. Prior to being elected he worked for the Connecticut House Democratic Caucus.

== Political career ==
Gaiewski was elected as a Democrat to the Groton town council in November 2023, after being appointed in August of that year.

On January 7, 2025, Christine Conley, who represented the 40th district in the Connecticut House of Representatives, resigned after being nominated as an administrative law judge for the Workers' Compensation Commission. Gaiewski was the Democratic and Working Families nominee in the election. He defeated Republican Robert Boris with 68.9% of the vote in the February 25 special election.

== Electoral history ==
2023 Groton town council election
Party	Candidate	Votes	%
Democratic	David McBride (incumbent)	3,017	7.56
Democratic	Portia Bordelon (incumbent)	2,989	7.49
Democratic	Rachael Franco (incumbent)	2,796	7.01
Democratic	Dan Gaiewski (incumbent)	2,757	6.91
Democratic	Jill Rusk	2,739	6.86
Democratic	Juliette Parker (incumbent)	2,729	6.84
Democratic	Bruce Jones (incumbent)	2,563	6.42
Democratic	Roscoe Merritt	2,397	6.01
Democratic	Adam J. Puccino, Sr.	2,288	5.73
Republican	Harry Watson	2,074	5.20
Republican	Pantea Umrysz	1,707	4.28
Groton Independents	Lauren Gauthier	1,566	3.92
Republican	Susan Deane-Shinbrot	1,543	3.87
Republican	Thomas Frickman	1,506	3.77
Republican	John Scott	1,502	3.76
Groton Independents	Bruce McDermott	1,488	3.73
Groton Independents	Bill Furgueson	1,478	3.70
Groton Independents	Scott Westervelt (incumbent)	1,472	3.69
Groton Independents	Genevieve Cerf	1,288	3.23
Total votes		39,899	100.0

2025 Connecticut's 40th House of Representatives district special election
Party	Candidate	Votes	%	±%
Democratic	Dan Gaiewski	1,518	66.03%	▲5.34%
Working Families	Dan Gaiewski	65	2.83%	▼0.20%
Total	Dan Gaiewski	1,583	68.86%	▲2.69%
Republican	Robert Boris	716	31.14%	▼2.69%
Total votes		2,299	100.00%	
