= Patricia Hendel =

American politician

Member of the Connecticut House of Representatives from the 40th district
- In office 1975–1981
- Preceded by: James H. McGill
- Succeeded by: Betsy Gibson

Personal details
- Born: Patricia Suzanne Thall
- Party: Democratic
- Spouse: Seymour Loren Hendel (m. 1951; died 2020)

Patricia Suzanne Hendel is an American politician who served in the Connecticut House of Representatives from 1975 to 1981, representing the 40th district as a Democrat. She lived in New London during her tenure, and she was married to Seymour Loren Hendel, a Connecticut Superior Court judge, from 1951 until his death in 2020.

== Personal life ==
She is Jewish.
