= Nora Magid =

Canadian-American writer and professor

Nora Magid (1926 - 1991) was a Canadian-American writer and professor in the department of English at the University of Pennsylvania. She was the literary editor of The Reporter and is the namesake of the Nora Magid Mentorship Prize and the PEN/Nora Magid Award for Magazine Editing.

== Career ==
Magid was the literary editor of The Reporter from 1954 to 1968. In 1970, Magid began teaching classes in nonfiction writing at the University of Pennsylvania and became a senior lecturer in 1984. In 1988, Magid won the Provost's Award for distinguished teaching.

Magid earned a reputation for being a skilled teacher and enthusiastic mentor, so much so that some former students of hers reportedly began calling themselves "Nora-ites." Magid's former students include Stephen Fried and Jean Chatzky. Upon Magid's death in 1991, Fried published an essay in Philadelphia magazine titled "My Last Paper for Nora: Notes on the passing of Penn's one-woman journalism school."

Works by Magid have appeared in numerous publications, including The New York Times and The Philadelphia Inquirer. Magid also had a long-term relationship with fellow writer and educator Gerald Weales.

== Death ==
Magid died of natural causes in her home in West Philadelphia in March 1991. She was 65 years old.

In 2003, a group of Magid's former students established the Nora Magid Mentorship Prize in her memory.
