= Parnassus (1973 magazine) =

Defunct American poetry magazine)

Parnassus: Poetry in Review
- The cover to Parnassus vol. 30, issues 1&2, published in 2008
- Editor and Publisher: Herbert Leibowitz
- Categories: Poetry, Fiction, Essays, Art, Reviews
- Frequency: Annually (print)
- Publisher: Poetry in Review Foundation
- Founded: 1973
- Final issue: 2019
- Country: United States
- Based in: New York City
- Language: English
- Website: www.parnassusreview.com
- ISSN: 0048-3028

Parnassus: Poetry in Review was an American literary magazine founded in 1973 that focused on reviews and literary criticism. It ceased publication in 2019.

== History and profile ==
Parnassus was founded by Herbert Leibowitz as editor and Stanley Lewis, the original publisher, in New York City. In 1976, Leibowitz set up the nonprofit Poetry in Review Foundation to sustain publication of the magazine, and he became publisher as well as editor.

The magazine stated on its website that its aim has been "to provide a forum where poets, novelists, and critics of all persuasions could gather to review new books of poetry, including translations ... with an amplitude and reflectiveness that Sunday book supplements and even the literary quarterlies could not afford. Reviews and essays, to be effective, would have to shun academic thinking and prose, and above all, embrace the diverse voices of democratic pluralism. Our literary profile has been defined by a passion for disinterested, wide-ranging, incisive commentary—and lilting prose; a poet's reputation has never guaranteed a favorable or negative review. We never impose a point of view on any of our writers."

Contributors of essays to the magazine included David Barber, Sven Birkerts, Hayden Carruth, Guy Davenport, Mary Karr, Wayne Koestenbaum, Seamus Heaney, Adrienne Rich, Helen Vendler, Eric Ormsby, and Marjorie Perloff.

The magazine published special theme issues on subjects including women and poetry, the long poem, words and music, autobiography, multiculturalism, and poetry and movies. In 2001, the journal's 624-page 25th anniversary issue contained a survey of international poetries. Most issues of the journal contained 400 pages with a distribution of 2,000 copies. In 1986, the journal published a special "Women in Poetry" issue that sold out its 2,500-copy print run.

Parnassus printed original art in every issue and commissioned portraits of poets from well-known artists such as Philip Pearlstein, Alice Neel, Red Grooms, Romare Bearden, as well as from young artists.

In 2007 the journal announced that it had lost its private funding, and that Volume 30 would be its last. In a piece in the Wall Street Journal (July 2007), Willard Spiegelman compared the fates of Parnassus and Poetry magazine, which had been heavily endowed by a bequest from Ruth Lilly. Because of this essay, another donor came to the rescue, anonymously, and gave Leibowitz enough money to keep the journal afloat for two more big issues, through Volume 32 (2010).

Parnassus published one final issue, Volume 35 nos. 1 & 2, in 2019.
