= Edward Moukawsher =

American politician

Member of the Connecticut House of Representatives from the 40th district
- In office January 8, 2003 – January 7, 2015
- Preceded by: Nancy DeMarinis
- Succeeded by: John F. Scott

Personal details
- Born: November 1, 1952 (age 73) Groton, Connecticut, U.S.
- Party: Democratic
- Relatives: Thomas G. Moukawsher

Edward Moukawsher (born November 1, 1952) is an American politician who served in the Connecticut House of Representatives from 2003 to 2015, representing the 40th district as a Democrat. He is the brother of fellow politician Thomas G. Moukawsher.
