= AGNI (magazine) =

American literary journal

- Cover of the April 2025 issue
- Discipline: Literary magazine
- Language: English
- Edited by: Sven Birkerts; William Pierce

Publication details
- Former name: The Agni Review (1972–1987)
- History: 1972–present
- Publisher: Boston University (United States)
- Frequency: Biannual (print), Weekly (online)

Standard abbreviations
- ISO 4: AGNI

Indexing
- ISSN: 1046-218X
- JSTOR: 1046218X

Links
- Journal homepage

AGNI is an American literary magazine that publishes poetry, fiction, essays, reviews, interviews, and artwork twice a year in print and weekly online from its home at Boston University. The publication was founded in 1972 at Antioch College as The Agni Review. Its coeditors are Sven Birkerts and William Pierce.

== History and background ==
AGNI was founded in 1972 as The Agni Review at Antioch College by former undergraduate Askold Melnyczuk. After a brief residency in New Jersey, it moved to Cambridge, Massachusetts, and Sharon Dunn joined Melnyczuk as coeditor in 1977. From 1980 to 1987 Dunn was the magazine's editor, first in Cambridge, then for three years in Western Massachusetts. In fall of 1987 Melnyczuk resumed editorship, and AGNI relocated to Boston University, later moving into the former offices of The Partisan Review at 236 Bay State Road. In July 2002 Sven Birkerts assumed the editorship, and after fifteen years as senior editor, William Pierce joined Birkerts as coeditor in 2019. The magazine receives support from the Boston University College of Arts and Sciences. In addition, AGNI relies on funding from the National Endowment for the Arts, the Mass Cultural Council, and individual donors.

AGNI publishes two 240-page print issues annually. Each issue includes 30–40 contributors, with a minimum print run of 2,500. AGNI has subscribers across the United States and in many other countries. It is carried by university and public libraries, and is distributed to independent and chain bookstores within the U.S. and Canada. AGNI Online, an electronic extension of the print magazine, features new writing each week: reviews, blog posts, and interviews, as well as a small selection of each print issue's stories, poems, and essays. AGNI has featured writers from Afghanistan, Mexico, Uganda, South Africa, India, Malaysia, China, South Korea, Egypt, Russia, Nigeria, Djibouti, The Gambia, Syria, Botswana, Kenya, Zimbabwe, Brazil, and many other countries, along with translations from Urdu, Dutch, Latin, German, Spanish, Hungarian, Ukrainian, Yiddish, Chinese, Turkish, Greek and ancient Greek, Hebrew, Albanian, Old English, Polish, Italian, Slovenian, French, Latvian, and more.

According to the magazine's website, "At AGNI we see literature and the arts as integral to the broad, engaged conversation that underwrites a vital society. Our poets, storytellers, essayists, translators, and artists lift a mirror to nature and the social world. They not only reflect our age, they respond."

The magazine's name derives from Agni, the Vedic god of fire and guardian of mankind. AGNI's symbol, the flying monkey, was originally conceived of by Erin Belieu, the magazine's managing editor at the time of its redesign, beginning with AGNI 40, and AGNI interns Richard Curtis and John Mulligan. It has been used since to represent the magazine.

== Awards and contributors ==
Melnyczuk received the PEN/Nora Magid Award for Magazine Editing in 2001 for his work with AGNI. This biennial award "honors a magazine editor whose high literary standards and tastes have, throughout his or her career, contributed significantly to the excellence of the publication he or she edits." In the text of the award, PEN wrote:

"[AGNI] has become a beacon of international literary culture.... Among readers around the world, AGNI is known for publishing important new writers early in their careers, many of them translated into English for the first time."

Six AGNI writers have gone on to win the Nobel Prize in Literature. One of them, Seamus Heaney, wrote that AGNI is "a reader's delight, a standard achieved, a balance held between service to new writers and fidelity to what's what in writing itself."

Other prominent writers who have debuted work of note in AGNI include Jhumpa Lahiri, Ha Jin, Mark Doty, Susanna Kaysen, Glyn Maxwell, Sven Birkerts, Olena Kalytiak Davis, Cristina Rivera Garza, Joyce Carol Oates, Derek Walcott, Russell Banks, Brock Clarke, E. C. Osondu, and Cynthia Huntington. Work first published in AGNI has been reprinted in The Pushcart Prize anthologies, The Best American Short Stories, The Best American Poetry, The Best American Essays, The Best American Nonrequired Reading, The Best American Travel Writing, The Best New Poets, Harper's, The O. Henry Prize Stories, Utne Reader, Poetry Daily, and The Best Spiritual Writing.

== Submissions ==
AGNI reads submissions from September 1 to May 31 of each year. Writers can send their work by mail or submit it through the website. The magazine's guidelines allow simultaneous submissions; AGNI sponsors no contests.

== AGNI Online ==
AGNI launched its online supplement in 2003 as an extension of the print journal. It posts new writing weekly. The website hosts more than 110,000 visitors (distinct hosts) per year.

== AGNI and Boston ==
AGNI holds several public events each year in the Boston area. The new print issues are released with biannual events on the Boston University campus.

== See also ==
- List of literary magazines
