= The Antioch Review =

- Spring 2008 issue cover
- Discipline: Literary journal
- Language: English
- Edited by: Robert S. Fogarty (last Editor)

Publication details
- History: 1941 to 2020
- Publisher: Antioch College (United States)
- Frequency: Quarterly

Standard abbreviations
- ISO 4: Antioch Rev.

Indexing
- ISSN: 0003-5769
- JSTOR: 00035769

Links
- Journal homepage

The Antioch Review is an American literary magazine established in 1941 at Antioch College in Ohio. The magazine was published on a quarterly basis. One of the oldest continuously published literary magazines in the United States prior to it being put on hiatus by the college in 2020, it published fiction, essays, and poetry from both emerging and established authors.

== History ==
The Antioch Review was founded in 1940 by small group of Antioch College faculty with the goal of creating a platform for "the voice of liberalism in a world facing the forces of fascism and communism." The first publication was released in 1941. In its early years, it was edited by collective, among whom were Paul Bixler and George Geiger, and later Paul Rohmann.

While its pages have been populated by innumerous academics, The Antioch Review does not publish footnotes, thus their contributions have been largely non- (rather than anti-) academic and journalistic in nature. Among the magazine's notable contributions, it published an article by Robert K. Merton in 1948 that introduced the world to the concept of the "self-fulfilling prophecy."

Dr. Robert S. (Bob) Fogarty, who joined the Antioch faculty in 1968 and was editor of The Antioch Review from 1977 to 2021, received the PEN/Nora Magid Award for Magazine Editing in 2003.

The magazine continued to publish despite the temporary 2008 to 2011 closing of Antioch College, which reopened in 2011.

=== Hiatus ===
In April 2020, Fogarty was furloughed by the college, due to the COVID-19 pandemic. In August, Fogarty and Ben Zitsman incorporated a nonprofit called the Antioch Review Foundation to raise funds and be in a position to take responsibility for the publication from the college, but were served a cease-and-desist order barring their use of the magazine name without involvement of the college, and any other actions relating to the Review.

The college subsequently said that because of the college's financial challenges, the publication was being put on hiatus after the Winter 2020 issue, which saw delayed publication during the Summer of 2020, while the college explored options. By October 2020, publication of the Review “just sort of stopped,” according to the magazine's long-time production editor Jane Baker; and, the college did not respond regarding the future of the Review to the editors. Fogarty's title as Editor was officially removed in June 2021, when the college retitled him as Editor Emeritus of the publication. He died two months later.

As of the Fall of 2025, the publication was still on hiatus, although the Antioch website at one point had promised a Fall 2024 relaunch.

== See also ==
- List of literary magazines
