= Phyllis Borzi =

American government official

Phyllis C. Borzi
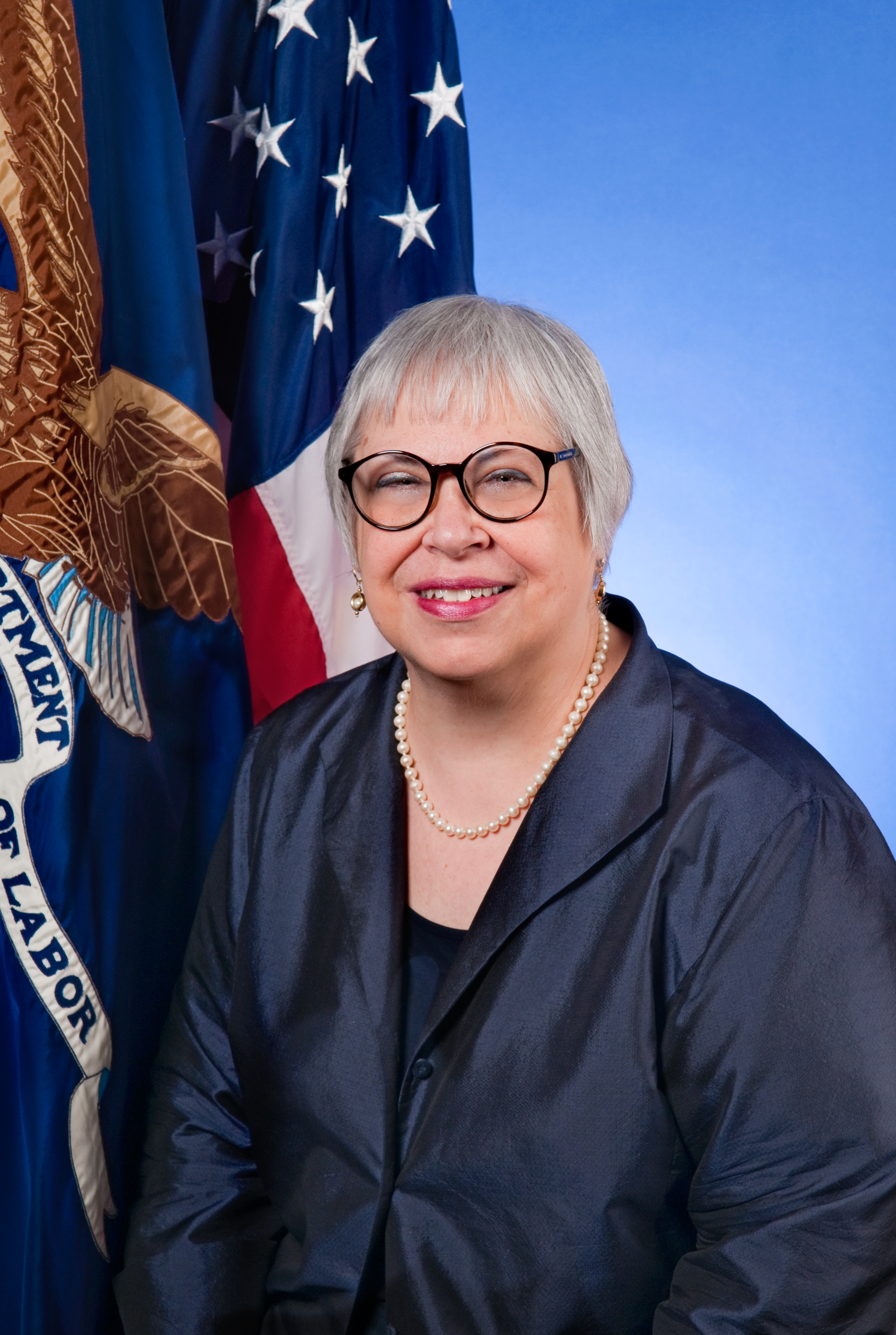

Assistant Secretary for Employee Benefits Security
- In office 2009–2017

Personal details
- Party: Democratic

Phyllis C. Borzi was the Obama administration's Assistant Secretary for Employee Benefits Security of the United States Department of Labor, the official in charge of the Employee Benefits Security Administration.

== Education ==
- Ladycliff College in Highland Falls, New York
- M.A. English, Syracuse University
- J.D. Catholic University

== Experience ==
- Research professor in the Department of Health Policy at George Washington University Medical Center’s School of Public Health and Health Services.
- Counsel with the Washington, D.C. law firm of O’Donoghue & O’Donoghue LLP, specializing in ERISA and other legal issues affecting employee benefit plan
- In 2008, appointed by the U.S. District Court for the Northern District of Ohio and served as a public member of the Administrative Committee for the Goodyear retiree health trust
- From 1979 to 1995, Borzi served as pension and employee benefit counsel for the U.S. House of Representatives, Subcommittee on Labor-Management Relations of the Committee on Education and Labor.
- In 1993, she served on working groups with the Clinton Task Force on Health Care Reform.
- Charter member and former President of the American College of Employee Benefit Counsel and served on its Board of Governors from 2000-2008
- Former member and former co-chair of the Advisory Board of the BNA Pension & Benefits Reporter;
- Former member of the Advisory Committee of the Pension Benefit Guaranty Corporation
- Former member of the Advisory Board of the Pension Research Council, The Wharton School, The University of Pennsylvania;
- Former member of the Board of the Women’s Institute for a Secure Retirement (WISER).

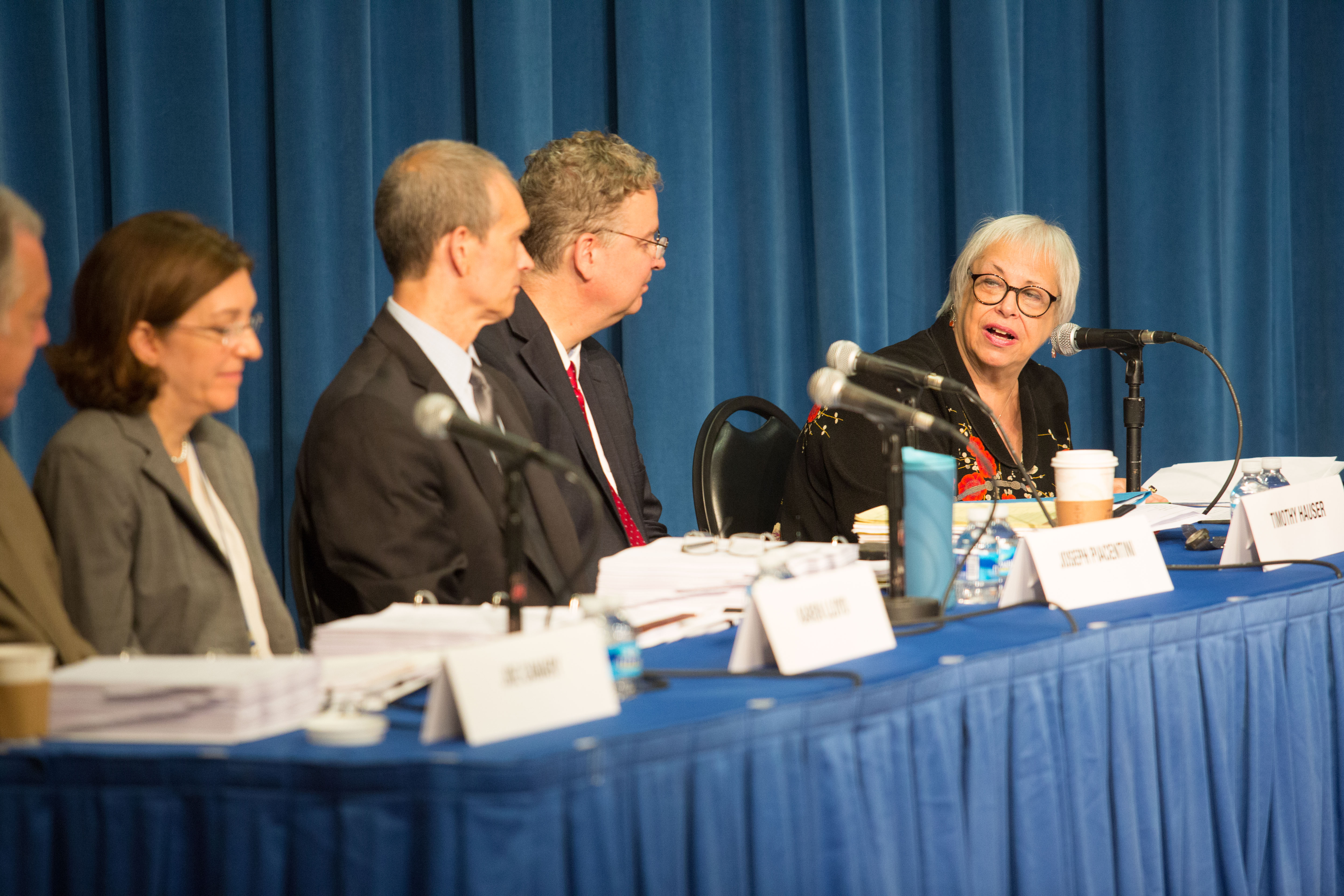
10 August 2015 – Washington, DC – Phyllis Borzi, Department of Labor Assistant Secretary for the Employee Benefits Security Administration (EBSA), delivers opening remarks at the Conflict of Interest (COI) public hearing.
