= Monika Bauerlein =

CEO of Mother Jones

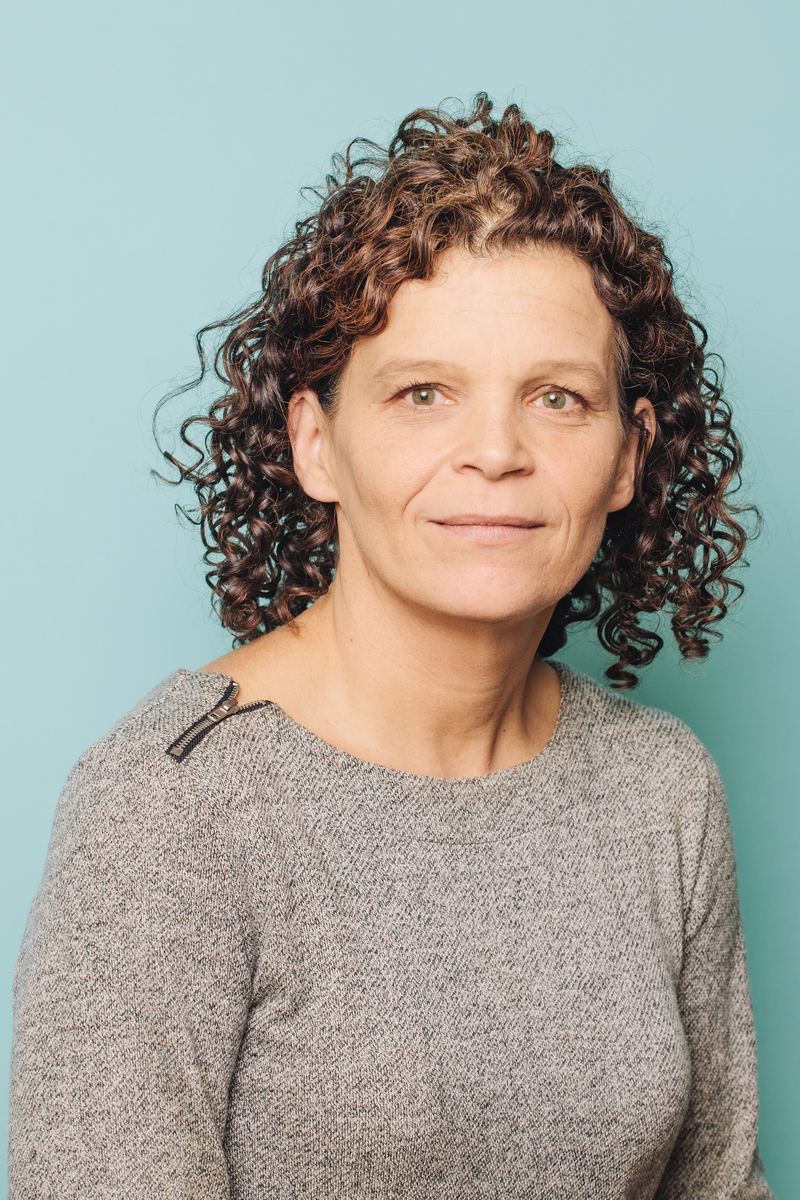
Monika Bauerlein

Monika Bauerlein (born 1965) is an American media executive who is the CEO of the Center for Investigative Reporting, which produces Mother Jones, the public radio show and podcast Reveal, and the podcast More To The Story. Previously she was co-editor of Mother Jones and, earlier in her career, a writer for other publications.

== Biography ==
Bauerlein was born in Germany, but has lived in several countries, including Italy, where her father, Heinz Bäuerlein, was a foreign correspondent. She came to America on a Fulbright scholarship and worked as a stringer for a variety of publications including Germany's Die Zeit and the Associated Press. Between 1991 and 2000, she was a writer, managing editor, and interim editor in chief at City Pages, which became the sister paper to the Village Voice in Minneapolis/St. Paul in 1997.

Bauerlein was promoted to the position of Mother Jones CEO in May 2015, following the departure of Madeleine Buckingham; previously she was the magazine's co-editor. Bauerlein first came to Mother Jones in 2000, and has, together with editor-in-chief Clara Jeffery, dramatically expanded its political and investigative reportage, as well as spearheaded the magazine's new investigative team and Washington bureau. In 2024, Mother Jones merged with the Center for Investigative Reporting, and Bauerlein became CEO of the merged organization.

Together, Bauerlein and Jeffery overhauled the website of Mother Jones, putting a greater emphasis on staff-generated, daily news and original reporting. During their tenure, the magazine has won 12 National Magazine Awards, including four for General Excellence, and in 2025, its collaboration with the Center for Public Integrity and Reveal, "40 Acres and A Lie" was selected as a Pulitzer Prize finalist in the explanatory reporting category. Mother Jones broke the "47 percent" story about Republican presidential candidate Mitt Romney, credited by some with having a significant effect on the 2012 United States presidential election.

In August 2013, Bauerlein shared the PEN/Nora Magid Award for Magazine Editing with Clara Jeffery for their work at Mother Jones. The judges wrote: "Mother Jones under Jeffery and Bauerlein has been transformed from what was a respected—if-under-the-radar—indie publication to an internationally recognized powerhouse [...] whose writers and reporters often put more well-known and deep-pocketed news divisions to shame."
