= Sven Birkerts =

American academic and writer

- Born: September 21, 1951 (age 74); Pontiac, Michigan, United States
- Education: University of Michigan; Cranbrook School
- Occupations: Essayist, literary critic
- Relatives: Gunnar Birkerts (father)
- Writing career
- Language: English

Sven Birkerts (born 21 September 1951) is an American essayist and literary critic. He is best known for his book The Gutenberg Elegies (1994), which posits a decline in reading due to the overwhelming advances of the Internet and other technologies of the "electronic culture." In 2006 he published a revised edition with new introduction and afterword, reflecting on the endurance of reading.

Birkerts was born in Pontiac, Michigan, and grew up in the metropolitan Detroit area. He graduated from Cranbrook School and from the University of Michigan in 1973.

After publishing several well-received books of collected essays on literature, Birkerts was appointed to many prominent editorial and teaching positions. He became the Director of the Bennington College Writing Seminars, a position he assumed after the death of Liam Rector. Birkerts was the editor of AGNI, the literary journal and has taught writing at Harvard University, Emerson College, Amherst College, and Mount Holyoke College.

He lives in Arlington, Massachusetts, with his wife Lynn. He has two children, Mara and Liam.

His father was noted architect Gunnar Birkerts, who based his practice in the Detroit area after immigrating to the United States following completion of his architectural degree in Stuttgart. The elder Birkerts was born and grew up in Latvia, leaving as a young man before the Soviet Army occupied the nation in the last days of World War II.

== Works ==
- An Artificial Wilderness: Essays on 20th Century Literature. (1987). New York: William Morrow. ISBN 9780688071134
- The Electric Life: Essays on Modern Poetry. (1989). New York: William Morrow. ISBN 9780688078614
- American Energies: Essays on Fiction. (1992). New York: William Morrow. ISBN 9780688106126
- The Gutenberg Elegies: The Fate of Reading in an Electronic Age. (1994). Boston: Faber and Faber. ISBN 9780571198498
- Literature: The Evolving Canon (1995) ISBN 9780205175154
- Readings. (1999). St. Paul, MN: Graywolf Press. ISBN 9781555972837
- My Sky Blue Trades: Growing Up Counter in a Contrary Time. (2002). New York: Viking. ISBN 9780670031092
- The Art of Time in Memoir: Then, Again (2007) ISBN 9781555974893
- Reading Life: Books for the Ages (2007) ISBN 9781555974640
- The Other Walk. (2011). St. Paul, MN: Graywolf Press. ISBN 9781555975937
- Changing the Subject: Art and Attention in the Internet Age. (2015). St. Paul, MN: Graywolf Press. ISBN 9781555977214
- The Miró Worm and the Mysteries of Writing (2024) ISBN 9798990405004

== Sources ==
- Alger, Derek. "Interview, May 1, 2005". pif Magazine.
