= American College of Employee Benefit Counsel =

The mission of the American College of Employee Benefits Counsel is to increase the public's understanding of employee benefits law and to raise its standards. It encourages the study, development and sponsors continuing legal education of employee benefits laws.
