= Sour Heart =

2017 short story collection by Jenny Zhang

Sour Heart: Stories
- Author: Jenny Zhang
- Genre: Literary fiction
- Publisher: Lenny
- Publication date: August 1, 2017
- Pages: 320
- ISBN: 978-0399589386

Sour Heart is a 2017 short story collection by Chinese American writer Jenny Zhang. Consisting of seven stories involving different Chinese families and their daughters, it was published by Lenny Books, Lena Dunham's Random House imprint.

The short story collection was critically acclaimed and named a best book of the year by several publications. It went on to win the Art Seidenbaum Award for First Fiction and the PEN/Robert W. Bingham Prize for Debut Short Story Collection.

== Table of contents ==
Title	Original publication, if any	Notes
"We Love You Crispina"	Glimmer Train	
"The Empty the Empty the Empty"	Diagram	
"Our Mothers Before Them"		
"The Evolution of My Brother"	Rookie	
"My Days and Nights of Terror"		
"Why Were They Throwing Bricks?"		Re-published in issue 28 of N+1 and winner of the 2018 O. Henry Prize
"You Fell into the River and I Saved You!"	The Iowa Review	

== Background ==
In The Brooklyn Rail, Zhang stated that "there's a span of fourteen years between when I wrote the first story of this collection and when this collection came to exist in the final state that it’s in now." Many of her stories, about Chinese girls, were written during her time at Stanford University and subsequently the Iowa Writers' Workshop, with "The Evolution of My Brother" being written during her sophomore year at the former and then revised at the latter.

As she shared and workshopped her drafts, Zhang received comments about how her short stories about Chinese girls lacked universality, after which she felt challenged to continue writing from her own perspective while still having resonance broadly: "it was a little test to myself, wanting to show that every type of story is possible with these characters."

In Iowa, Zhang realized that all of her short stories "exist in the same fictional universe." However, she struggled to find a literary agent who would pick up her short stories, which caused her to try to write a novel instead. Her subsequent "failure to write a novel" then led her to revisit her short stories, rewrite them "in a fairly painstaking way, going word-by-word and changing, in many cases, almost every word," and then sell them as a book.

Sour Heart was the first book to be published by Dunham's Lenny imprint at Random House. Dunham had read Zhang's poetry collection, Dear Jenny, We Are All Find, and the two connected over Twitter. Years later, Dunham had asked Zhang if she had any material that she would "want to show, say, an editor at Random House." At the time, Zhang had decided to try to sell Sour Heart.

== Themes ==
Zhang was born in Shanghai but moved to New York City when she began elementary school. Of Chinese heritage, Zhang stated that she often felt "a profound sense of loss," largely due to her waning ability to speak Chinese, as well as the estrangement of being a minority in the United States: "Being a 1.5 generation immigrant is to exist between pages, even between boundaries. It feels like I’m missing a history—I don’t have a past in America or in China."

Regarding the centrality of the second-generation Chinese American girl's voice to the short story collection, Zhang stated that she wanted to have an organizing principle for her short story collection based around "this period of my life, where I was interested in exploring four or five big questions in different ways over and over again." Girlhood, in Zhang's conception, "is a story of desire; innocence; fall from innocence; being desired; being not desired; being desired by the wrong people; by dangerous people; by the right people; by excitingly dangerous people" and thus bore limitless potential to her as a place of storytelling. Of the multiplicity of daughters shown in Sour Heart, Zhang stated:

I neither wanted these kids to be just cute and innocent and naive, but nor did I want to strip them of that innocence. I think these girls in particular, they are kind of left to their own devices in these stories because their parents are working or just very busy with survival ... I just found that period to be a time where anything is possible and everything you’re doing is almost for the first time. It was a feeling that was very easy for me to get into.

== Critical reception ==
Cleo Qian, writing for Electric Literature, recommended Sour Heart in a list of books regarding women's loneliness. Publishers Weekly stated that Zhang "has a gift for sharp, impactful endings, and a poet’s ear for memorable detail" and commended her short stories full of complexity regarding immigrant life in America. Kirkus Reviews panned the book, calling it full of possibility but falling short of narrative maturity.

Jia Tolentino, in The New Yorker, lauded the simultaneity of Zhang's tight, sophisticated prose with her hard-hitting sentimentality in stories such as "We Love You Crispina," as well as her unique and diverse angles on the nature of love in Chinese American families. The Guardian similarly remarked on Zhang's protagonists as "a chorus of voices rich with reinvention" that convey "many forms of expression at once."

Katy Waldman, in Slate, called Zhang's debut "gorgeous and grotesque" while commending her realism which "sets the 'model minority myth' on fire":

I cannot overstate how satisfying it is to hear such maximalist obscenity gushing from Asian American women, who are rarely afforded the luxury of coarseness when they appear in pop culture. It’s not that Zhang’s characters are tough-talking rebellious "types," but simply that they’re full of all the humanity that real people possess.

Christian Lorentzen, for Vulture, observed that child narrators are often hard to write from because "they are often obnoxious" but argued that Zhang's protagonists "speak in the language of childhood, with its unruly spirit and raw emotions" without the aforementioned problem. Calling Sour Heart one of "the knockout fiction debuts of the year," Lorentzen lauded Zhang's masterful control over time, memory, and nostalgia for coming of age in the eighties and nineties. The Fader, likewise, called the book "a deconstructed bildungsroman, hinged on the exhausting mindfuck of trying to figure out who you are."

Christine Mi, writing for The Brooklyn Rail, wrote that "The brilliance of Sour Heart is its ability to create fractals out of these intimate family portraits of three or four or five. These tiny self-sufficient worlds each tell a story that is unique yet enormous, a familiar and timeless tale of carving out a space in a crowded new world."

Terry Hong, in The Christian Science Monitor, concluded that Zhang's unflinching approach to autobiographical fiction led to rich, genuine narratives of childhood but still with a sense of "universal shared experience" that would resonate with any reader grappling with the complicated idea of home. Similarly, The Independent, rating the book three out of five stars, found it full of "universal truths about what it means to belong" and lauded Zhang for disparaging her peers' advice to stop writing about Chinese girls.

== Film adaptation ==
In 2017, A24 optioned the short story collection for film. Two years later, in 2019, the studio announced that they would finance, produce, and distribute a film adaptation of Sour Heart, retitled to Sour Hearts, directed by Cathy Yan and co-written by Yan and Zhang.

== Awards ==
- Art Seidenbaum Award for First Fiction, winner
- PEN/Robert W. Bingham Prize for Debut Short Story Collection, winner
- Young Lions Fiction Award, finalist
