= Naked Singularity (film) =

Film

- Official poster
- Directed by: Chase Palmer
- Written by: Chase Palmer; David Matthews
- Based on: A Naked Singularity by Sergio De La Pava
- Produced by: Tony Ganz; P. Jennifer Dana; Kevin J. Walsh; Ryan Stowell
- Starring: John Boyega; Olivia Cooke; Bill Skarsgård; Ed Skrein; Linda Lavin; Tim Blake Nelson; Robia Angelo DeVille
- Cinematography: Andrij Parekh
- Edited by: Katharine McQuerrey
- Music by: Brendan Angelides
- Production companies: 3311 Productions; Anton; Scott Free Productions; Wolf Entertainment
- Distributed by: Screen Media Films
- Release dates: April 9, 2021 (SFIFF); August 6, 2021 (United States)
- Running time: 93 minutes
- Country: United States
- Language: English
- Box office: $14,571

Naked Singularity is a 2021 American black comedy crime thriller film, directed by Chase Palmer in his directorial debut, from a screenplay by Palmer and David Matthews. It is based upon the 2008 novel of the same name by Sergio De La Pava. It stars John Boyega, Olivia Cooke, Bill Skarsgård, Ed Skrein, Linda Lavin, Robia Angelo DeVille and Tim Blake Nelson.

It had its world premiere at the San Francisco International Film Festival on April 9, 2021, and was released in a limited release on August 6, 2021, prior to VOD on August 13, 2021, by Screen Media Films.

== Plot ==
In New York City, public defender Casi is 26 years old and has been out of law school for three years, but he is frustrated not only about his job but about the inability for many people to get the help they need. Craig visits the city impound lot and tells clerk Lea he wants to get a friend's car out, offering her a lot of money and flirting. Later, he is using the computer at her apartment. Several days later, Casi's friend Dane tells him Lea wants Casi to handle her case. Lea explains that she went to the Lincoln Navigator that Craig wanted and found the drugs he wanted. The car is scheduled to be auctioned in ten days. The police agree to let Lea help them. Lea tells Craig that for the risk she is taking, she deserves a million dollars. Later, Craig and a very large man kidnap Lea and take her to a building where she sees a body in a freezer.

Casi gives bad advice to a defendant who escapes, and the strict Judge Cymberline threatens to end his career. Told he will get six month's suspension if he is lucky and disbarred if he is not, Casi starts talking with Dane about how they can benefit from the drugs in the SUV.

During a power outage, Casi and Lea end up in bed at her apartment. When Casi leaves, he is confronted by Craig and his goon.

On the day of the auction, Casi and Dane plot to get the SUV and the drugs, with Lea's help. Casi swaps the tracking device and Craig bids on the SUV, but a man with an accent wins the SUV. However, that man is pulled over by the police and the drugs are delivered to a building where men who appear to be Hasidic Jews are doing something illegal. Casi and Dane, dressed as Hasidic Jews, use tear gas to steal the money that was paid for the drugs. Casi and Dane rescue Lea from Craig.

Casi, Lea and Dane each take a share of the money. Casi ends up back in front of Judge Cymbeline working for himself, representing a defendant who wants to sue the city.

== Cast ==
- John Boyega as Casi
- Olivia Cooke as Leah Deleon
- Bill Skarsgård as Dane
- Ed Skrein as Craig Bayonne
- Tim Blake Nelson as Angus
- Robia Deville as Defendant
- Linda Lavin as Judge Cymbeline
- Kyle Mooney as The Golem
- Robert Christopher as Detective Winston
- Robert T. Bogue as Detective Coburn
- K. Todd Freeman as Jimmy
- Scott Barrows as The Whale
- Robert Lee Leng as Gold Grillz
- Rao Rampilla as Cabbie
- Lee Sellars as Detective Lynley

== Production ==
In December 2018, it was announced John Boyega had joined the cast of the film, with Chase Palmer directing from a screenplay he wrote alongside David Matthews. Ridley Scott will serve as an executive producer under his Scott Free Productions banner. Dick Wolf will also serve as an executive producer. In April 2019, Olivia Cooke joined the cast of the film. In May 2019, Ed Skrein and Bill Skarsgård joined the cast of the film.

Principal photography began in New York City in May 2019. The scenery was designed by Elizabeth Jones and executed by Roman Turovsky.

== Release ==
It had its world premiere at the San Francisco International Film Festival on April 9, 2021. In June 2021, Screen Media Films acquired distribution rights to the film. It was released in a limited release on August 6, 2021, prior to video on demand on August 13, 2021.

== Reception ==
On Rotten Tomatoes, the film holds an approval rating of 28% based on 40 reviews, and an average rating of 4.60/10. The critics' consensus reads: "Naked Singularity has wild ambition and a talented lead on its side, but neither ingredient is enough to offset the film's clumsy jumble of tones and ideas". On Metacritic, the film has a weighted average score of 36 out of 100 based on 12 critics, indicating "generally unfavorable reviews".
