= Skinship (short story collection) =

2021 short story collection by Yoon Choi

Skinship is a collection of eight short stories written by Yoon Choi and published on August 17, 2021 by Alfred A. Knopf. The stories give insight into the Korean American experience and are told from different generations of immigrants, giving the book as a whole and all-encompassing perspective. It has been praised for showing the complexity of the human experience, language, and relationships as cultures collide.

Yoon Choi was awarded the PEN/Robert W. Bingham Prize for Debut Fiction in 2022 for the book.

== Author ==
There is an excerpt in the beginning of the book giving a small biography of the author — "Yoon Choi was born in Korea and moved to the United States at the age of three. She has an MA from Johns Hopkins University and is a former Stegner Fellow at Stanford. Her stories and essays have appeared in New England Review, Narrative, and Best American Short Stories 2018. She lives with her husband and four children in Anaheim, California."

In interviews by The Korea Society and Kirkus, Yoon Choi emphasized that she did not want to write about her experiences as a Korean immigrant after she finished college. She felt the need to "Europeanize" her stories because she believed to be taken seriously, she needed to write like the western, white men that created the books she read and loved. In the live stream interview with The Korea Society, Choi admits that this line of thinking caused her to produce nothing at all. She struggled to come up with character names, resorting to reading through baby name books to find relatable, western names. It was only after stepping away from her writing efforts for a number of years that she returned to it to embrace her cultural experience after giving birth to her fourth child. In an interview with The Orange County Register, Choi said, "It's a collection I would have wanted to have on my bookshelf when I was younger."

== Culture ==
Skinship is a word used in Japanese culture to describe nonsexual, physical affection between family or friends. It is mostly known specifically for a mother showing affection to her children, but it is not limited to that. It is a mix of the words "skin" and "kinship." This is a word that has been used by Japanese for a long time, but as Japanese culture and media is becoming more popular in the west, it was recently added to the Oxford English Dictionary in 2021.

"Skinship" is the title of one of the short stories and the title of the book, but it also describes the theme throughout all eight short stories. It represents the complexity of the relationships between the characters and if skinship is shown in a loving or aggressive and violent way.

In the Kirkus interview, Choi says that "skinship" is a word that she grew up hearing her mother use. She explains, "Koreans are deeply emotional people. In Korea, there’s a sense of not only physical affection, but also national affection. There's something really lovely about that." This gives insight as to why the word "skinship" is powerful concept in the book and helps reflect Korean culture.

Korean culture has not been well represented in America until recently because the contemporary wave of Korean immigrants were just arriving between the 1960s and 1990s. This wave was due to the passing of the Immigration and Nationality Act of 1965. No longer being stalled by strict immigration laws and in search of a better home after the Korean War, immigrants came to America in great numbers. Yoon Choi herself was part of this wave and is now contributing to an accurate depiction of her culture that was missing from her childhood.

== Language ==
Due to the subject matter of these short stories, Yoon Choi had to make calculated decisions on how to illustrate language usage and differences caused from being bilingual. In an interview with Katherine Jin, another Asian American writer, Choi talks about her language choices in great detail. "There are just so many levels of communication going on that I found extremely challenging at first, and then I found extremely invigorating to think through those problems in writing." She explains that there are moments when she writes a Korean word phonetically for English readers or translate a Korean phrase into something interesting that would not make sense in a literate translation. She also had to consider staying true to how Korean people speak in English without adding on to the negative stereotype of how a Korean person sounds to an English speaker.

== Summary ==
=== The Church of Abundant Life ===
The reader is introduced to a married couple from Korea who own a convenient store in a poor neighborhood in Pennsylvania. It is told in first person point of view by the wife, Soo-ah, who reveals her true feelings on her experience in America. Her husband, Jae-woo, is taken with the American Dream and personally attacks Soo-ah when she disagrees with his business decisions. Their situation is not what she had pictured when she agreed to leave the country with him. There is clear tension in their marriage after years of struggling in a new world immersed in new cultures. Their dynamic, as well as concepts of the future and regret, is further explored when an old friend of theirs from Korea is giving a church revival in their town.

=== First Language ===
A Korean woman named Sae-ri is set up with an American man through a matchmaker after having a child out of wedlock, a son named Min-soo, with her English tutor as a teenager. Sae-ri carries this secret until her mother can no longer care for the child back home and she must admit to her husband the truth. Sae-ri explains her experience going through the matchmaking process and the conflicting feelings about leaving her son. She also tells how they have handled integrating her son into her and her husband's lives with two little girls, and handling his problematic behavior. This story highlights the differences between an American marriage and a Korean marriage in terms of love, duty, and forgiveness.

=== A Map of the Simplified World ===
A third grader from Korea named Ji-won moved to America the year before. Her teacher has a map of where everyone in his class is from because the teacher wanted to celebrate their diversity. While the students are contained in the classroom, pointing out their differences only makes them call each other racial slurs on the playground. Ji-won meets a new student who is Indian named Anjali and they develop a close friendship. Ji-won is aware of their cultural differences because her family only visits other Korean families and her mother makes negative comments about Indians. The young girls find refuge in each other despite this and have an unspoken agreement to not talk about their home life, seeing each other as individuals. Then with an outbreak of lice, the racial stereotypes suddenly hold meaning for Ji-won's character.

=== Solo Works for Piano ===
Albert is a man in his forties who is a well trained pianist with undiagnosed autism. He teaches piano and is left with bombarding memories of the past when a fellow student in his college class reconnects with him looking for a piano teacher for her daughter. The friend, Sasha, bring her daughter to him to learn because she has autism and Sasha assumes that Albert understood this about himself. After this interaction, it is clear that he does not and he must look inward to understand his view of the world.

=== Skinship ===
A young girl named So-hyun flees Korea with her brother, Ji-ho and their mother in an attempt to escape their abusive father. They fly to America to stay with the mother's sister and the girl's cousin Susie. So-hyun and Susie are the same age at twelve, but Susie makes it clear to So-hyun that she and her family is not welcome. Her mother seems to have exchanged one miserable situation with another and is treated like a maid around the home. Years later, So-hyun reconnects with her father showing change and transformation of the family's dynamic.

=== The Art of Losing ===
An elderly man named Mo-sae struggles with the early symptoms of Alzheimer's disease and his wife, Young-ja takes care of him. He struggles to hold on to his memories as they begin to fade, but not disappear. He expresses his awareness when his wife leaves and he reminds himself of all the things he must remember. Young-ja hides her own illness and the two struggle to find balance with each other.

=== The Loved Ones ===
A young Korean man named Happy Hyuk-jae was adopted by a white American woman and now shadows a nurse at a hospital because he cannot find a job. Their patient is a Korean war hero named Young-shik who is dying. Happy and Young-shik's granddaughter represent a manifestation of American ideology and a loss of Korean culture while Young-shik fought for it. Happy feels disconnected with his heritage due to being adopted but when the opportunity arises to learn more when taking care of Young-shik, he is preoccupied thinking about tattoos. These two characters foil each other as their experience with their own culture is wildly different.

=== Song and Song ===
After suffering the loss of her mother, a woman attempts to make connection with her sister, Minji, and her teenage daughter, Charis. Her and her sister have conflicting personalities and do not speak until ten years after their mother's death. Her and her daughter Charis are at a point of disconnection and teen angst in their relationship. She attempts to reconcile with her family through a trip to Europe and the complications of familial relationships is displayed.

== Reception ==
This book has received positive attention and exceptional praise for its contribution to Korean American content. The Asian/Pacific American Librarians Association commends Choi's work in their book review and focuses on the intricate familial bond, representation of the culture, her use of language. The review states, "APALA members will appreciate Choi’s clear, inventive, and elegant prose, perfectly tailored to unveil the vast emotional depth and spectrum about the Korean American hardships and resilient dreams of immigrant families."

In another review done by Alice Stephens for Washington Independent Review of Books, the author compliments Choi's quality of writing and how she touches on immigrants finding their place in the world. "But what lingers is not the prose but the weight of other worlds, absent ancestors, and the diaspora's awkward longing for a disappeared past and an unattainable future."

A book review by Maureen Corrigan for npr.org stresses how Choi is able to convey emotions and concepts that are not existent in the west. "Choi is the kind of writer whose work creates situations and emotions so complex, we don't even have the words for them, at least not in English."
