= A Naked Singularity =

2008 novel by Sergio De La Pava

- First edition cover
- Author: Sergio De La Pava
- Genre: Legal thriller
- Publisher: Xlibris
- Publication date: 2012
- Pages: 689 pages (first edition)
- Awards: PEN/Robert W. Bingham Prize
- ISBN: 9781436341981
- OCLC: 286351419

A Naked Singularity is a legal thriller and the debut novel of American author Sergio De La Pava. Originally self-published in 2008 through XLibris, it was commercially re-published in 2012 and subsequently won the PEN Prize for Debut Fiction in 2013.

== Reception ==
Literary site The Quarterly Conversation ran a review by Scott Bryan Wilson that called the book "one of the best and most original novels of the decade" and "a towering, impressive work." That review caught the eye of staff at The University of Chicago Press, who signed the book up and published it in paperback in April 2012. The book was named one of the ten best works of fiction of 2012 by The Wall Street Journal. In the Chicago Tribune, Julia Keller wrote, "A Naked Singularity is not about physics. It's about the American criminal justice system in a large and chaotic city, a place slowly crushed by hopelessness in the same way that an ancient star is gradually crushed by gravity. . . . It is about a city that teeters on the edge of total collapse and complete disaster, but that has the capacity to right itself (whew!) at the last possible second." A Naked Singularity went on to win the PEN/Robert W. Bingham Prize from PEN as the best debut novel of that year. On February 10, 2014, it was named one of eight books on the shortlist for the inaugural Folio Prize for the best book published in the United Kingdom in 2013.

== Film adaptation ==
On 18 December 2018, it was announced that Scott Free Productions will produce a film adaptation. Screenwriter Chase Palmer will make his directorial debut with David Matthews writing the script, Anton distributing, and starring John Boyega as Casi, Olivia Cooke, and Bill Skarsgård. The film, titled Naked Singularity, premiered at the San Francisco International Film Festival on 9 April 2021.
