= Furman L. Templeton =

Baltimore Civil Rights Leader

Furman Laurence Templeton was a campaigner for African American civil rights in Baltimore, Maryland. He served 25 years as the Executive Director of the Baltimore Urban League, 20 years as a member of Selective Service Board 13 in Baltimore, he was the former Vice-chairman of the Baltimore Housing Authority, a member of a Maryland Commission on Interracial Problems and Relations, and he was also a chairman of the Social Education and Action Committee of the Presbytery of Baltimore.

== Early life ==
Furman Laurence Templeton (1908–1970) was born in Hackensack, New Jersey. He earned a bachelor's degree at Lincoln University in Pennsylvania and was awarded an honorary doctor of laws degree by Morgan State College in Baltimore.

== Professional life ==
In his twenty-five year service to the Baltimore Urban League, Furman L. Templeton was awarded and honored with the Good Citizenship of the Alpha Phi Alpha fraternity, the Man of the Year Plaque of the Omega Phi fraternity, the Maryland Negro Achievement Medal, and the Certificate of Merit of the Veterans of Foreign Wars.

Templeton's first position at the Baltimore Urban League was as the Secretary of Industry in 1941, a position the Baltimore Urban League created to increase the number of African Americans working in profitable lines of employment. He was chosen for this position because after he graduated Lincoln University he was the first African American to be appointed an interviewer in the Baltimore office of the state employment service on August 15, 1933 by Oliver C. Short as the white State director. In his first year as the Secretary of Industry in the Baltimore Urban League, Templeton fought for African American painters of Baltimore rights to Union membership. Also that year, Templeton questioned the government purchase of Perryman, Maryland land. This land was going to be used to expand the southwest border of the Aberdeen proving grounds, and was also the home to about 150 families, a third of them were African Americans who were now forced to seek new homes and sell their homes for a quarter of the present purchase price per acre of land, and are buying white homes for more.

Later, when Furman L. Templeton served as the Executive Director for the Baltimore Urban League his focus was on education. He created a program for African Americans to advance their educations as well as provide avenues for job placement. Thanks to his efforts in education and involvement in civil rights causes Furman L. Templeton Elementary School, at 1200 Pennsylvania Ave of Baltimore, Maryland is named in his memory.

== Death ==
Upon his death on February 12, 1970, Furman L. Templeton left his wife Irene Roye-Templeton and their two sons, Furman L Templeton, Jr and Roye Stansbury Templeton, at their residence on the 1500 block of McCulloh Street. Because Templeton worked hard to create equality for the African Americans in Baltimore he left a lasting impact, and a small legacy in the school that is now his namesake. He also left a grandson, Stefan Templeton, b. 1967. A granddaughter Kimberly STempleton, b.1966 and grandson Evan Seth Templeton b . 1968.
