= PEN/Robert W. Bingham Prize =

Literary award for debut novels

The PEN/Robert W. Bingham Prize for Debut Short Story Collection is awarded by the PEN America (formerly PEN American Center) "to exceptionally talented fiction writers whose debut work — a first novel or collection of short stories ... represent distinguished literary achievement and suggests great promise." The winner is selected by a panel of PEN Members made up of three writers or editors. The PEN/Robert W. Bingham Prize was originally named the PEN/Robert Bingham Fellowship for Writers. The prize awards the debut writer a cash award of US$25,000.

The PEN/Robert W. Bingham Prize was established in memory of Robert W. Bingham, who died in 1999 at the age of 33, to commemorate his support of young writers, his love of literature, and his contribution to literary fiction.

The award is one of many PEN awards sponsored by International PEN affiliates in over 145 PEN centres around the world. The PEN American Center awards have been characterized as being among the "major" American literary prizes.

== Award winners ==
PEN/Robert W. Bingham Prize winners and finalists
Year	Author	Title	Result	Ref.
2002	Carolyn Cooke	The Bostons	Winner	
2002	Matthew Klam	Sam the Cat and Other Stories	Winner	
2002	Manil Suri	The Death of Vishnu	Winner	
2004	Jonathan Safran Foer	Everything Is Illuminated	Winner	
2004	Will Heinrich	The King's Evil	Winner	
2004	Monique Truong	The Book of Salt	Winner	
2006	Christopher Coake	We're in Trouble	Winner	
2007	Janna Levin	A Madman Dreams of Turing Machines	Winner	
2008	Dalia Sofer	The Septembers of Shiraz	Winner	
2009	Donald Ray Pollock	Knockemstiff	Winner	
2010	Paul Harding	Tinkers	Winner	
2011	Susanna Daniel	Stiltsville	Winner	
2011	Danielle Valore Evans	Before You Suffocate Your Own Fool Self	Winner	
2011	Teddy Wayne	Kapitoil	Runner-up	
2012	Vanessa Veselka	Zazen	Winner	
2012	Ben Lerner	Leaving the Atocha Station	Runner-up	
2013	Sergio De La Pava	A Naked Singularity	Winner	
2013	Wiley Cash	A Land More Kind than Home	Shortlisted	
2013	Jac Jemc	My Only Wife	Shortlisted	
2013	Lucia Perillo	Happiness Is a Chemical in the Brain	Shortlisted	
2013	Claire Vaye Watkins	Battleborn	Shortlisted	
2014	Shawn Vestal	Godforsaken Idaho	Winner	
2014	Anthony Marra	A Constellation of Vital Phenomena	Shortlisted	
2014		Brief Encounters with the Enemy	Shortlisted	
2014	Ian Stansel	Everybody's Irish	Shortlisted	
2014	Hanya Yanagihara	The People in the Trees	Shortlisted	
2014	Louise Aronson	A History of the Present Illness	Longlisted	
2014	Jim Gavin	Middle Men	Longlisted	
2014	Alan Grostephan	Bogotá	Longlisted	
2014	Christopher Hacker	The Morels	Longlisted	
2014	Paul Rome	We All Sleep in the Same Room	Longlisted	
2015	Jack Livings	The Dog: Stories	Winner	
2016	Mia Alvar	In the Country: Stories	Winner	
2016	Julie Iromuanya	Mr. and Mrs. Doctor	Finalist	
2016	Angela Flournoy	The Turner House	Finalist	
2016	Jennifer Tseng	Mayumi and the Sea of Happiness	Finalist	
2016	Viet Thanh Nguyen	The Sympathizer	Finalist	
2017	Rion Amilcar Scott	Insurrections: Stories	Winner	
2017	Clare Beams	We Show What We Have Learned	Finalist	
2017	Brit Bennett	The Mothers	Finalist	
2017	Yaa Gyasi	Homegoing	Finalist	
2017	Cote Smith	Hurt People	Finalist	
2018	Jenny Zhang	Sour Heart	Winner	
2018	Hannah Lillith Assadi	Sonora	Finalist	
2018	Venita Blackburn	Black Jesus and Other Superheroes: Stories	Finalist	
2018	Emily Fridlund	History of Wolves	Finalist	
2018	Carmen Maria Machado	Her Body and Other Parties: Stories	Finalist	
2019	Will Mackin	Bring Out the Dog	Winner	
2019	Chaya Bhuvaneswar	White Dancing Elephants	Finalist	
2019	Jamel Brinkley	A Lucky Man	Finalist	
2019	Helen DeWitt	Some Trick	Finalist	
2019	Akil Kumarasamy	Half Gods	Finalist	
2020	Mimi Lok	Last of Her Name	Winner	
2021	Michael X. Wang	Further News of Defeat: Stores	Winner	
2021	Dima Alzayat	Alligator & Other Stories	Finalist	
2021	Miriam Cohen	Adults and Other Children: Stories	Finalist	
2021	Mary South	You Will Never Be Forgotten	Finalist	
2021	Shruti Swamy	A House Is a Body: Stories	Finalist	
2022	Yoon Choi	Skinship	Winner	
2022	Carribean Fragoza	Eat the Mouth That Feeds You	Finalist	
2022	Dantiel W. Moniz	Milk Blood Heat	Finalist	
2022	Clare Sestanovich	Objects of Desire: Stories	Finalist	
2022	Chris Stuck	Give My Love to the Savages: Stories	Finalist	
2023	Morgan Talty	Night of the Living Rez	Winner	
2023	Sindya Bhanoo	Seeking Fortune Elsewhere	Finalist	
2023	Meron Hadero	A Down Home Meal for These Difficult Times	Finalist	
2023	Jasmine Sawers	The Anchored World: Flash Fairy Tales and Folklore	Finalist	
2023	Morgan Thomas	Manywhere: Stories	Finalist	
2024	Aaliyah Bilal	Temple Folk	Finalist	
2024	Stacie Shannon Denetsosie	The Missing Morningstar and Other Stories	Finalist	
2024	Kate Doyle	I Meant It Once: Stories	Finalist	
2024	Kenan Orhan	I Am My Country	Finalist	
2024	Gen Del Raye	Boundless Deep, and Other Stories	Longlisted	
2024	Kristen Gentry	Mama Said: Stories	Longlisted	
2024	Mai Nardone	Welcome Me to the Kingdom	Longlisted	
2024	Ada Zhang	The Sorrows of Others	Longlisted	
2024	Cleo Qian	LET'S GO LET'S GO LET'S GO	Withdrawn	
2024	Ghassan Zeineddine	Dearborn	Withdrawn	
2025	Amy Stuber	Sad Grownups	Winner	
2025	Megan Howell	Softie	Finalist	
2025	Annell López	I'll Give You a Reason	Finalist	
2025	Iheoma Nwachukwu	Japa and Other Stories	Finalist	
2025	Marguerite Sheffer	The Man in the Banana Trees	Finalist	
