= Jenny Zhang (writer) =

Chinese-American writer, poet, and essayist

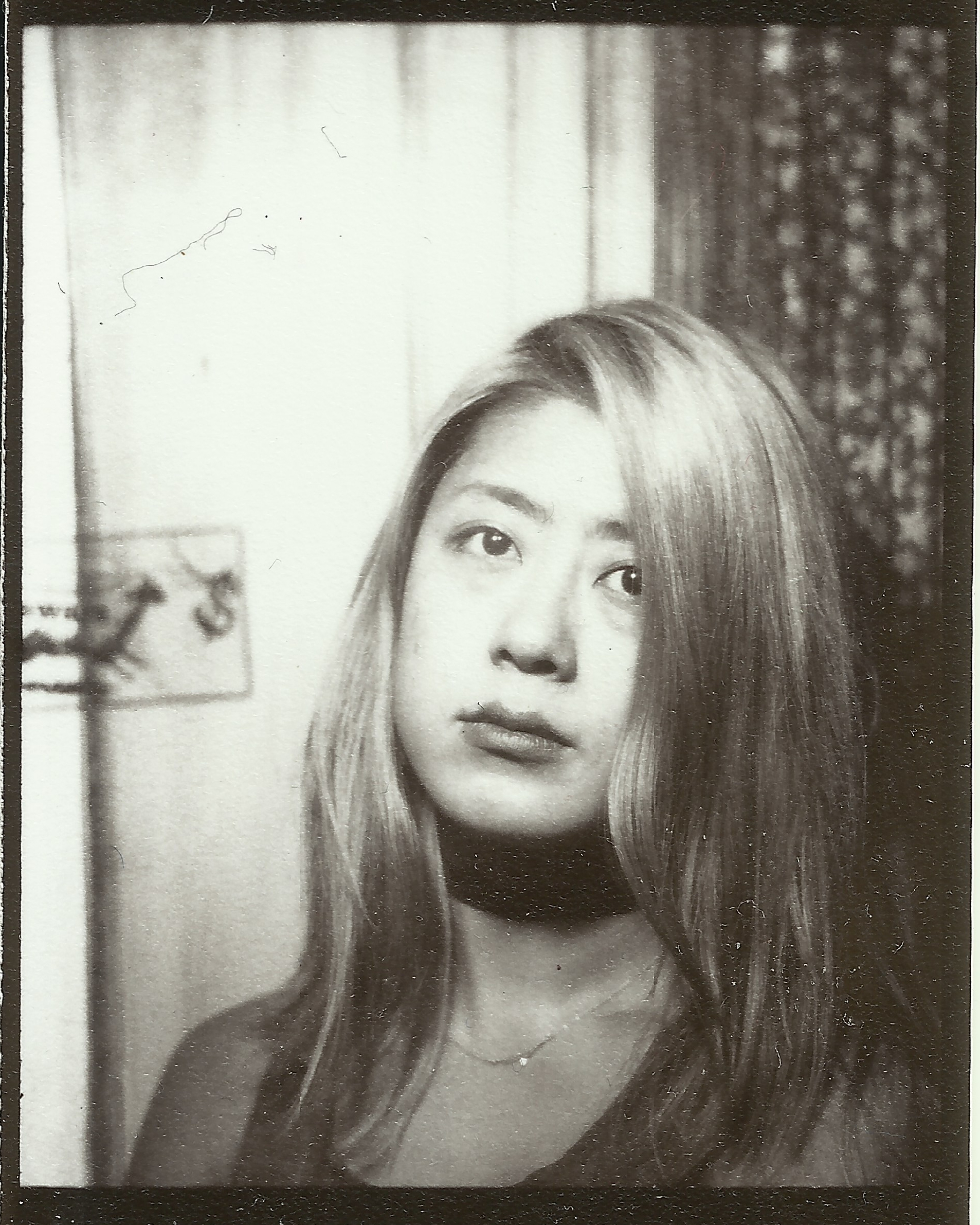
- Born: 1983 (age 42–43); Shanghai, China
- Other name: Jenny Bagel
- Education: Stanford University; Iowa Writers' Workshop
- Occupations: Writer; Poet; Essayist
- Years active: 2010-present

Jenny Zhang (born 1983) is an American writer, poet, and prolific essayist based in Brooklyn, New York. One focus of her work is on the Chinese American immigrant identity and experience in the United States. She has published a collection of poetry called Dear Jenny, We Are All Find and a non-fiction chapbook called Hags. From 2011 to 2014, Zhang wrote extensively for Rookie. Additionally, Zhang has worked as a freelance essayist for other publications. In August 2017, Zhang's short story collection, Sour Heart, was the first acquisition by Lena Dunham's Lenny imprint, Lenny Books, via Random House.

== Early life ==
Zhang was born in Shanghai, China. When she was five years old, Zhang immigrated to New York City to join her father, who was studying linguistics at New York University, and mother, who had come to the United States after the Chinese Cultural Revolution. Her father withdrew from the PhD program he was enrolled in, began to work as a teacher, and re-enrolled in school for computer programming, with the family eventually moving to Long Island where her father ran a computer repair business. She has a younger brother.

In 2005, Zhang graduated from Stanford University with a BA in Comparative Studies in Race & Ethnicity. In 2009, Zhang received a Master of Fine Arts in fiction from the Iowa Writers' Workshop.

== Career ==
After college, Zhang moved to San Francisco where she worked as a union organizer for Chinese home healthcare workers and as an organizer for the writing non-profit 826 Valencia which helps children and young adults learn how to write. Zhang spent a summer in Hungary teaching English as a second language.

While in graduate school at the Iowa Writers' Workshop, Zhang taught creative writing to undergraduates at University of Iowa. Zhang then taught high school students in the Bronx, Queens, and Brooklyn. She has also taught at the New School for Social Research and at Sackett Street Writers' Workshop.

From 2011 to 2014, Zhang was a regular contributor to the online magazine for teen girls, Rookie, for which she has written both fiction and nonfiction since the magazine's inception.

Among the essays Zhang wrote for Rookie were a 2012 tribute to the rapper M.I.A., The Importance of Angsty Art, an essay on embracing "bad" writing, Odd Girl In, an essay about the conflict between the impulse to rebel and the desire to join political movements, partly based on Zhang's experiences with organizing and activism in San Francisco, Empathy Excess, an essay about emotional abuse and the limits of empathy, and Far Away From Me, an essay about the search for decolonized love, a conflicted teenage love for Weezer, and a deconstruction and investigation into fetishization, objectification, and internalized racism.

In 2012, Zhang published a collection of poetry called Dear Jenny, We Are All Find. Zhang had written some of the poems that made up the collection during her time at Iowa Writers' Workshop, which she did in secret as the poetry program was separate from her fiction program. She wrote the rest of the poems while living in the south of France. The poems were submitted to a contest for a small press, Octopus Books.

In 2014, Lena Dunham asked her to join a promotional tour for her book, Not That Kind of Girl. This later led to Dunham publishing Zhang's 2017 book, Sour Heart.

2015's "Hags" is an essay Zhang wrote in one night after watching Senator Wendy Davis do a 13-hour filibuster of SB5, a Texas Senate bill that sought to limit access to abortion services. It was then published by Guillotine Books as a limited edition chapbook.

In July 2015, Zhang published an essay called "How It Feels" for an issue of Poetry magazine that was curated by Tavi Gevinson. The essay was a meditation on depression, suicide, excess, Tracey Emin, and poetry. It was nominated for a National Magazine Award.

In August 2015, one of Zhang's stories was included in the first issue of Lena Dunham's Lenny newsletter.

In September 2015, Zhang wrote about issues of racism in the literary community for BuzzFeed.

In August 2017, Zhang's short story collection, Sour Heart, was published by Lena Dunham's Lenny Books imprint on Random House. Many of the stories were written and evolved over a long period of time, with the oldest having initially been written when Zhang was 19 years old, the short story called "The Evolution of My Brother." Zhang said that the title and theme of the book came from a wish "to convey the unreality of childhood, the sweetness and the sourness of being so small, so helpless, and so dependent on adults. We tend to render childhood as purely idyllic and innocent, or totally nightmarish and traumatic, but there's a spectrum of nuance that lies between." Sour Heart, a group of seven bildungsroman stories, received positive reviews.

In May 2019, it was announced that Sour Heart would be made into a movie, to be directed by Cathy Yan.

== Selected works and publications ==
In chronological order by section

=== Poetry ===
- Zhang, Jenny (Summer 2012). "Everyone's Girlfriend" (PDF). Clock (3). Florence, MA: O'clock Press: 10–11.
- Zhang, Jenny (December 2012). "Flush in the spirals of black holes". Coconut (15).
- Zhang, Jenny (16 December 2012). "The Last Five Centuries Were Uneventful". HTMLGIANT.
- Zhang, Jenny (January 2013). "seppuku". Sink Review (10).
- Zhang, Jenny (January 2013). "goo goo water". Sink Review (10).
- Zhang, Jenny (26 April 2013). "The Universal Energy Is About to Intervene in Your Life". Bomb. Archived from the original on 7 October 2017.
- Zhang, Jenny (26 April 2013). "MY BABY FIRST BIRTHDAY". Bomb. Archived from the original on 7 October 2017.
- Zhang, Jenny (Spring 2013). "My baby first birthday". Pinwheel (2).
- Zhang, Jenny (Spring 2013). "You are the poorest person here". Pinwheel (2).
- Zhang, Jenny. "uncle boo." Adult
- Zhang, Jenny. "My baby first birthday." Adult
- Zhang, Jenny (Fall 2013). "I would have no pubes if I were truly in love" (PDF). Adult (1). Third Rail Quarterly: 9–10.
- Zhang, Jenny (Fall 2013). "It was a period when cunt was in the air" (PDF). Adult (1). Third Rail Quarterly: 67.
- Zhang, Jenny (25 June 2014). Adult. Archived from the original on 14 July 2014.
- Zhang, Jenny (26 September 2014). "I Would Have No Pubes If I Were Truly In Love". The Hairpin. Archived from the original on March 6, 2023.
- Zhang, Jenny (7 November 2014). "I'm a 30 year old White non racist male, with some of my closest friends being Black". The Hairpin. Archived from the original on March 6, 2023.
- Zhang, Jenny (November 2014). Dumb Theory. Prelude.
- Zhang, Jenny (22 January 2015). "It Is Finally Midsummer". The Hairpin. Archived from the original on March 6, 2023.
- Zhang, Jenny (27 February 2015). "Is There A Way To Drain A Lake You Are Afraid You Will One Day Drown In?". The Hairpin. Archived from the original on October 7, 2023.
- Zhang, Jenny (27 March 2015). "Anaphora". The Hairpin. Archived from the original on April 10, 2019.
- Zhang, Jenny (2015). "Don't Fucking Text Your Friends When I'm Reading A Poem It Took Two Years to Write". In Lauer, Lynn; Melnick, Lynn (eds.). Please Excuse This Poem: 100 New Poets for the Next Generation. New York: Viking/Penguin. ISBN 978-1-101-61538-6. OCLC 905345570.
- Zhang, Jenny (4 August 2017). "Follow Him". BuzzFeed.

=== Non-fiction ===
- Zhang, Jenny. "Untitled". Altered Scale.
- Zhang, Jenny. "The Empty The Empty The Empty". The Diagram. 9 (4). ISSN 1543-5784.
- Zhang, Jenny (July 2010). "The Truth". Glimmer Train Stories.
- Zhang, Jenny (13 January 2011). ""Tiger Mothers" Aren't The Whole Story". Jezebel.
- Zhang, Jenny (8 December 2011). "The Evolution of My Brother". Rookie (4).
- Zhang, Jenny (18 April 2012). "Outsider/Insider". Rookie (8).
- Zhang, Jenny (8 May 2012). "Parent Trap". Rookie (9).
- Zhang, Jenny (11 July 2012). "Sneaking Around". Rookie (11).
- Zhang, Jenny (26 July 2012). "Liberating Things". Rookie (11).
- Zhang, Jenny (19 September 2012). "Saving Yourself". Rookie (13).
- Zhang, Jenny (5 October 2012). "It Takes a Lot to Laugh". Rookie (14).
- Zhang, Jenny (10 October 2012). "Eat, Memory". Rookie (14).
- Zhang, Jenny (15 October 2012). "Literally the Best Thing Ever: M.I.A." Rookie (14).
- Zhang, Jenny (14 November 2012). "The Great Pretender". Rookie (15).
- Zhang, Jenny (23 November 2012). "Only in My Dreams". Rookie (15).
- Zhang, Jenny (31 December 2012). "Mad Love". Rookie (16).
- Zhang, Jenny (11 April 2013). "The Importance of Angsty Art". Rookie (20).
- Zhang, Jenny (28 February 2014). "Hold On, Sour Grape". Rookie (30).
- Zhang, Jenny (26 May 2014). "Odd Girl In". Rookie (21).
- Zhang, Jenny (15 July 2014). "Hello, Darkness". Rookie (23).
- Zhang, Jenny (25 July 2014). "Jenny Zhang's sisterhood is stranger than yours" (Excerpt from Hags). Dazed.
- Zhang, Jenny (16 February 2015). "February 14, 2015, Part III". Enormous Eye.
- Zhang, Jenny (28 April 2015). "Far Away From Me". Rookie (44).
- Zhang, Jenny (15 April 2015). "Empathy, In Excess". Rookie (44).
- Zhang, Jenny (July 2015). "How It Feels". Poetry. Poetry Foundation.
- Zhang, Jenny (11 September 2015). "They Pretend To Be Us While Pretending We Don't Exist". BuzzFeed.
- Zhang, Jenny (17 March 2016). "On Blonde Girls in Cheongsams". Racked.
- Zhang, Jenny (8 April 2016). "The Summer I Learned I Wasn't the Exception". New York. Archived from the original on 11 April 2016.
- Zhang, Jenny (12 June 2016). "Mitski: Beauty, Love, and Rivers Cuomo - Mitski in conversation with Jenny Zhang". Yours Truly.
- Zhang, Jenny (1 September 2016). "At the Salton Sea". Harper's Magazine.
- Zhang, Jenny (15 November 2016). "Against Extinction". The New Inquiry.
- Zhang, Jenny (9 March 2017). "25 Songs That Tell Us Where Music Is Going: #24: Your Best American Girl by Mitski". The New York Times.

=== Fiction, poetry, and essay collections ===
- Zhang, Jenny (Fall 2011). "We Love You Crispina". Glimmer Train Stories (80).
- Zhang, Jenny (Fall 2011). "You Fell Into the River and I Saved You!". The Iowa Review. 41 (2): 150–160. doi:10.17077/0021-065X.7038. JSTOR 23208462.
- Zhang, Jenny (30 September 2011). "There Was No Creek and I'm Still Alive". Rookie (1).
- Zhang, Jenny (2012). Dear Jenny, We Are All Find. Portland, Oregon: Octopus Books. ISBN 978-0-985-11820-4. OCLC 779872842.
- Zhang, Jenny (July 2014). Hags. Guillotine Series #7. Archived from the original on 1 July 2014.
- Zhang, Jenny (24 August 2015). "Settling". Lenny Letter. Archived from the original on 2 October 2017. – also known as Pity Our Errors, Pity Our Sins
- Zhang, Jenny (2015). The Selected Jenny Zhang (eBook). Emily Books.
- Zhang, Jenny (7 April 2017). "Why Were They Throwing Bricks?". N+1 (28).
- Zhang, Jenny (2017). Sour Heart: Stories. New York: Lenny. ISBN 978-0-399-58938-6. OCLC 962438345.
- Bolick, Kate; Zhang, Jenny; Machado, Carmen Maria; Smiley, Jane (2019). March Sisters: On Life, Death, and Little Women. New York: The Library of America. ISBN 978-1-598-53628-7. OCLC 1104646242.
- Zhang, Jenny (2020). My Baby First Birthday: Poems. Portland, Oregon: Tin House Books. ISBN 978-1-947-79381-1. OCLC 1125356711.

=== Other works ===
Video

- "The Last Five Centuries Were Uneventful"
- "Comefarts"

Photography

- Zhang, Jenny (18 July 2014). "The Right to Idle: Photos of Jenny's free days in Lithuania". Rookie (35).

== Honors ==
- 2009-2010: Iowa Writers' Workshop, Provost Fellowship
- 2009-2010: Iowa Writers' Workshop, Teaching-Writing Fellowship
- 2010: Zoetrope All-Story Short Fiction Contest, 2nd prize
- 2012-2013: Lower Manhattan Cultural Council, Workspace writer-in-residence
- 2016: National Magazine Awards, Essays and Criticism finalist for How It Feels
- 2016: APRIL Festival, Writer-in-Residence
- 2018: Los Angeles Times Book Prize, Art Seidenbaum Award for First Fiction
- 2018: PEN/Robert W. Bingham Prize for Sour Heart
