= Mia Alvar =

Filipino-American writer

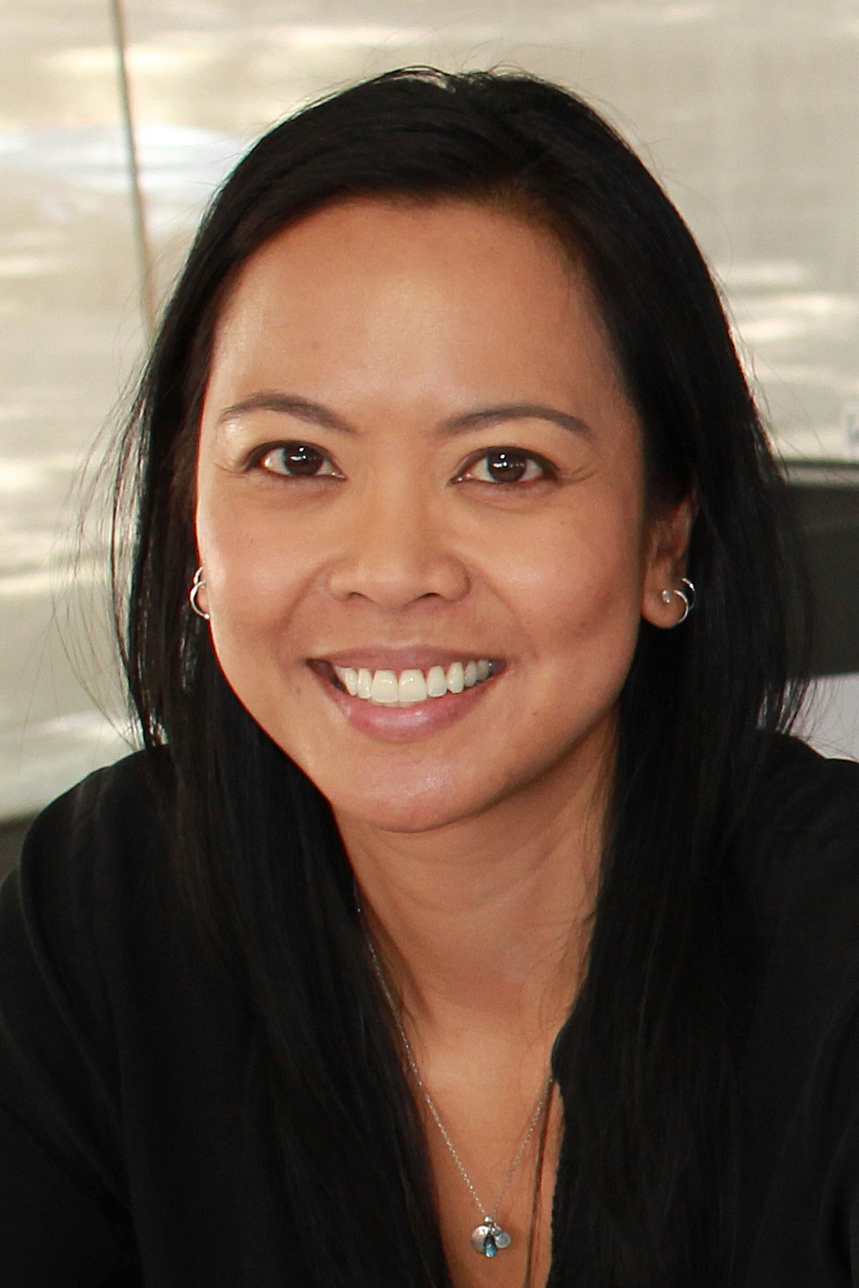
- Alvar at the 2015 Texas Book Festival.
- Education: Harvard College, Columbia School of Arts
- Occupation: Writer
- Writing career
- Language: English
- Notable work: In the Country: Stories (2015)
- Notable awards: B&N Discover Great New Writers 2015; NY Times Editors' Choice 2015; PW Best Book of 2015
- Website: miaalvar.com

Mia Alvar is a Filipino-American writer based in New York. She won a PEN/Robert W. Bingham Prize for In the Country.

== Life ==
Alvar was born in Manila and at six moved to Bahrain with her parents, joining her uncle already living there. After four years in Bahrain, they moved to New York City, where her mother then began graduate school in special education at Columbia University. She received her undergraduate degree at Harvard College in 2000 and earned her MFA from the School of Arts at Columbia University in 2007. While a senior in college, Alvar returned to the Philippines for the first time in ten years and began recording her experiences of Manila which provided material for her stories.

Her critically regarded debut work, In the Country (2015), features nine stories about exiled Filipino workers living in the Middle East and the United States who lead "morally messy" and "unpredictable" lives full of "contradictions and weaknesses". These characters are part of the Philippine diaspora: workers dispersed around the globe for economic reasons to work as maids and nurses and in other jobs. Alvar offers "deft portraits of transnational wanderers" who are "blessed and cursed with mobility," according to New York Times critic J. K. Ramakrishnan, with a major theme in her work being the cultural conflicts of immigrants.

Critic Maureen Corrigan on NPR described Alvar's writing style as gorgeous. Ramakrishnan compared her characters to ones written by Nadine Gordimer. Chicago Tribune critic Amy Gentry described Alvar's prose as "precise and patient" with a gift for "grounded human-scale metaphors". Christian Science Monitor critic Steve Donoghue described Alvar's talent as the "smart depiction of lives lived between two worlds" offering "vivid glimpses of street life in Manila." In the Country won numerous awards, including the PEN/Robert W. Bingham Prize, the Barnes & Noble Discover Great New Writers list, and was listed as a New York Times "Editors' Choice" book. In 2016, In the Country received the Janet Heidinger Kafka Prize, only the second short story collection to win in the award's history.

== Works ==
- In the Country: Stories, New York: Alfred A. Knopf, 2015. ISBN 9780804171496, OCLC 891324469
