= The Book of Salt =

2003 debut novel by Monique Truong

- Author: Monique Truong
- Language: English
- Genre: Historical fiction
- Set in: Paris, Vietnam
- Publisher: Houghton Mifflin
- Publication date: 2003
- Publication place: United States
- ISBN: 978-0-618-30400-4

The Book of Salt is the 2003 debut novel by Vietnamese-American author Monique Truong. It follows Bình, a Vietnamese cook in the Paris home of Gertrude Stein and Alice B. Toklas. This book is structured as a stream of consciousness narrative, in which events from the Lost Generation in Paris in the 1920s and 1930s are recounted alongside Binh's memories of his childhood in French-colonial Vietnam.

== Characters ==
=== Bình ===
Bình is a gay Vietnamese cook who, at the present time in the novel, is living in Paris, working as the personal chef to Gertrude Stein and Alice Toklas. Bình struggles to find a love, acceptance, and a home in Paris after traumatizing experiences in his youth in French-colonized Vietnam; in particular, he wrestles with his father's criticism and rejection of his homosexual son. Bình seeks to dispel his feelings of exile and alienation through romantic relationships and through becoming a part of Gertrude Stein's household, where he is privy to Stein's and Toklas's personal lives.

=== Gertrude Stein ===
Truong creates a creative depiction of Gertrude Stein's private life during her time in Paris. She is depicted as a private, but exuberant woman who delights in her weekly private salons and the attention she receives from them. Gertrude Stein abstains from the routines of domestic life, preferring to focus on her writing or inspiration for it and leaving the management of 27 rue de Fleurus to her lover, Alice Toklas.

=== Alice B. Toklas ===
Alice B. Toklas is another historical figure whom Truong fictionalizes in her novel. She lives with Gertrude Stein as her companion publicly and her lover privately; Miss Toklas manages the home, including Bình's employment, allowing Gertrude Stein freedom from daily routine and allowing her more time to write. Miss Toklas also types Stein's handwritten work and compiles her writings. Although continually assured of Gertrude Stein's love for her, Miss Toklas suffers from feelings of jealousy and insecurity, especially during the salons when talented young artists fawn over Stein as their idol.

=== Bình's family ===
- Bình's father, usually referred to as The Old Man, is, among other things, a Catholic pastor in a small Vietnamese town and an alcoholic. He is highly critical of Bình, eventually disowning his son upon the discovery of his homosexuality. "The Old Man" becomes Bình's interior voice of criticism in adulthood, even after the father's death.
- Bình's mother is a highly maternal figure. She reluctantly entered her marriage to Bình's father with no fortune and no family, and she detests her husband. She is the only member of the family who understands and appreciates Bình, and she pays him special attention by teaching him to cook and telling him hopeful stories.
- Minh, Bình's older brother, is the sous-chef in the Governor-General's house under Chef Blériot. Minh is an extremely hard worker, and he secures a position in the kitchen for Bình where he teaches him both cooking and French. Bình realizes, however, that despite Minh's hard work and skill, he can never become a head chef under French Colonialism in Vietnam.

=== Chef Blériot ===
Chef Blériot is the head chef at the Governor-General's house in Vietnam. He is a French chef who takes Bình, his kitchen boy, on as a translator in the Vietnamese produce market. The two develop a romantic relationship, the unprofessional and interracial nature of which results in Bình's dismissal from the kitchen.

=== The Man on the Bridge ===
Bình meets the Man on the Bridge years before he meets Gertrude Stein and Miss Toklas, in 1927. He is another Vietnamese man in Paris, who has been to many places and held various jobs in the past, including cook, kitchen boy, photograph retoucher, and letter writer on the Latouche Tréville. He is compared to the "scholar-prince" described in Bình's mother's stories. Bình later discovers a photograph of this man, named Nguyen Ai Quoc – the same name Ho Chi Minh used when he was in France. In reality, Ho Chi Minh was in Paris for a brief period in 1927, and he worked on a boat named the Latouche Tréville. Although these facts are never explicitly stated in the book, they suggest that the Man on the Bridge was Ho Chi Minh.

=== Sweet Sunday Man ===
The Sweet Sunday Man is an American mulatto iridologist living in Paris. His relationship with Bình begins with the employment of the chef and evolves into a romantic relationship. The two men are bonded by their status as exiles from their respective homelands. The Sweet Sunday Man is, however, primarily interested in Gertrude Stein and her work; he strives to gain entrance to her weekly salon and persuades Bình to steal one of Stein's manuscripts for him.

== Themes and motifs ==
=== Photographs ===
Much of Binh's story revolves around photographs. The book opens with him examining two pictures taken when his Mesdames leave for America. For both photos, Binh explains precisely what he is doing in the background of each. Later in the novel, Binh admires a photo of Gertrude Stein donning a kimono. He finds this photo hidden away in the cabinet where Gertrude Stein keeps her writing journals. Photography also surfaces when Sweet Sunday Man promises to get his photograph taken with Binh, only if Binh promises to give Sweet Sunday Man a copy of Gertrude Stein's work. Finally, the most valuable photograph becomes the one of the man on the bridge. After all, Binh decides to save his money for this photo, so he can purchase it from the photographer at a later date. Through this photograph, Binh also realizes the significant impact the evening with the man on the bridge had on Binh's life. Because of this man, Binh finds a reason for staying in Paris. Thus, through photographs, Binh finds his identity by uncovering a purpose for his life. He uses the photographs to tell his life story, only after Gertrude Stein has told her version of Binh's life. Although Binh has not mastered the proper languages needed to counteract Gertrude Stein's story of himself through the written word, Binh regains control over his own story by telling his tales through photographs. As a result, he shows that stories are just like pictures. There are many hidden meanings in each story and photograph, and the story or photograph presented does not always convey the full picture.

=== Colonialism ===
Since the novel takes place at a time when Vietnam is still a part of French Indochina, the colonial presence is very strong throughout the book, affecting Binh's life both in Vietnam and as an immigrant in Paris. Binh's older brother Minh represents one extreme of the colonized person's response to the colonizer. Minh embraces French culture and, especially, the French language, believing it holds the ticket to social advancement. The Man on the Bridge, if he indeed is Ho Chi Minh, could be seen as the other extreme: resistance. Binh represents a position in between these two extremes, as he assimilates into the French colonial structure to, for example, find work, but retains a running critique in his mind of all that he sees, thus allowing for a sort of internal rebellion.

One offshoot of colonialism, as put forth by Edward Said, is Orientalism, a system of studying, subjugating, and "othering" the Orient in order to set it off against the West. One result of Orientalism is that the Orient is seen as a collective whole, and differences between the groups that constitute the Orient are minimized. For example, Binh describes how in Paris he is simply seen as French Indochinese, with no effort being taken to ascertain if he is from Vietnam, Laos, or Cambodia. Another issue is that Binh is constantly considered an exotic "other," worthy of study. This becomes apparent when Binh discovers a notebook written by Gertrude Stein (entitled the Book of Salt) about him. The powerlessness felt by the colonized person is demonstrated by the fact that Binh can recognize his name countless times among the many words in the notebook, but since it is written in English, he does not know what is written about him. On the other hand, because the novel itself is written through the eyes of Binh, we are presented with a sort of reverse Orientalism. Binh, the "Oriental" narrator, turns the West into an object of study and critiques what he sees as its strange cultural practices, such as the Steins' pampering of their dogs.

=== Salt ===
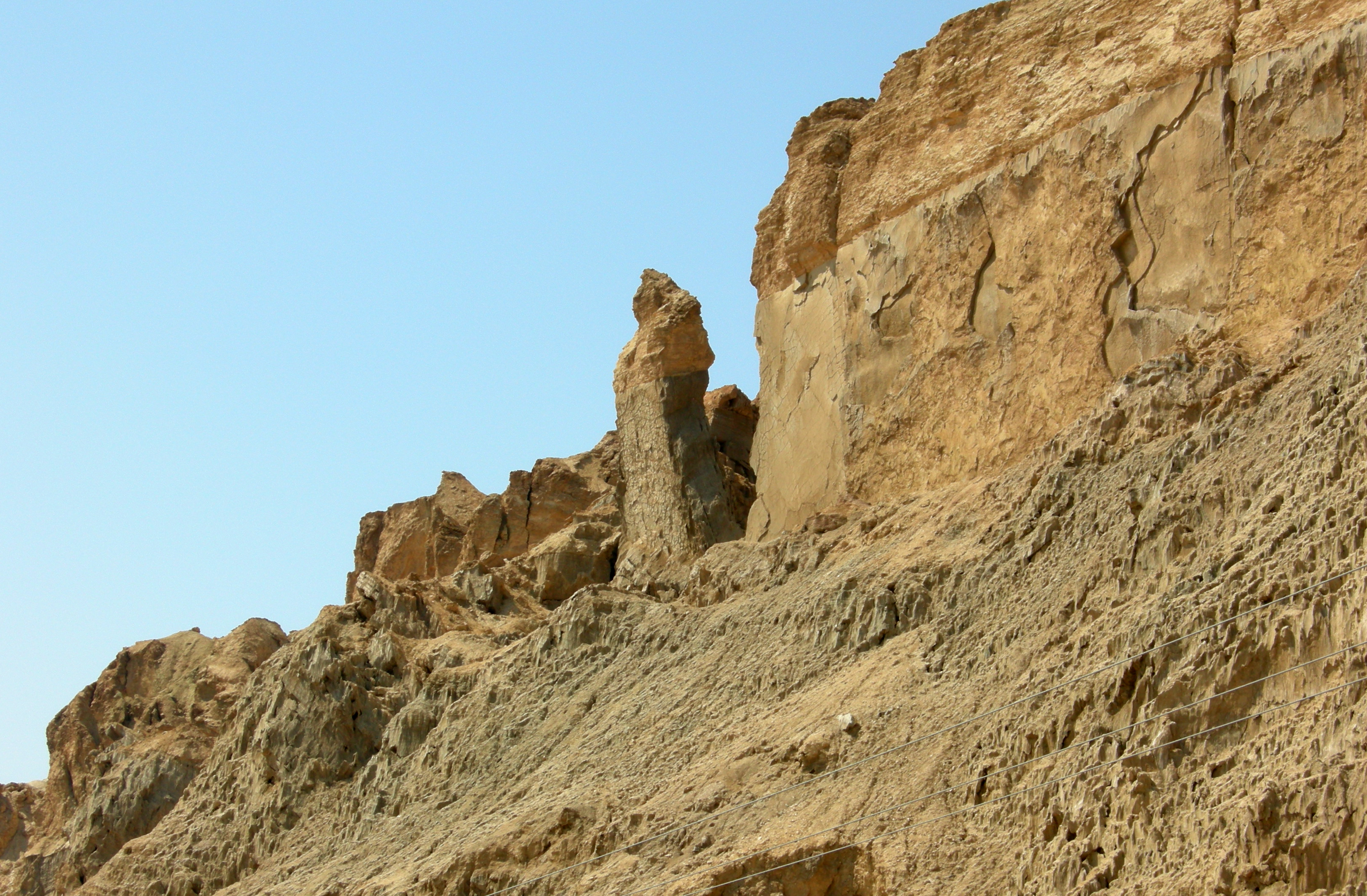
Mount Sodom, Israel, showing the so-called "Lot's Wife" pillar made of halite like the rest of the mountain.

As the title of the book suggests, salt is an important recurring image throughout the novel. Binh describes how salt can mean different things depending on where it comes from: kitchen, sweat, tears, or the sea. The word salary comes from the word salt, so salt is another way of saying labor, worth, value. Binh, after all, "is constantly made aware of his place in the household hierarchy." The book uses salt and its many connotations to connect themes of love and redemption. Food also adds to the meaning of salt in this context. Truong herself states that "Food or the preparation of food, at its best, is a profound act of intimacy." Salt also implies homosexuality in terms of the Biblical connotation of salt, in particular to the turning of Lot's wife into a pillar of salt for looking back at her home, to the city of Sodom. This is an implication that God not only disapproves the activities of the Sodomites but also of nostalgia.

=== Diaspora ===
Since Binh was born and raised in Vietnam but currently resides in Paris, he can be described as a first generation immigrant. He deals with many of the themes common amongst people in diaspora, including struggling to acquire a second language (in Binh's case, French), adapting to new social norms, and reaching out to other members from his same ethnic community (e.g., The Man on the Bridge). As a minority living in diaspora, Binh struggles to create an identity for himself which reconciles his new experiences and self-conception to his past.

== Awards and honors ==
- 2003 Lambda Literary Award, nominee
- 2004 PEN/Robert W. Bingham Prize, co-winner
- 2004 ALA Stonewall Book Award, winner
- 2004 Young Lions Fiction Award, winner
