= Bitter in the Mouth =

2010 novel by Monique Truong

- First edition
- Author: Monique Truong
- Language: English
- Publisher: Random House Publishing Group
- Publication date: August 31, 2010
- Publication place: United States
- Pages: 304
- ISBN: 9780679603429
- OCLC: 669071627

Bitter in the Mouth is a 2010 novel by Vietnamese-American author Monique Truong. The novel is written in a stream of consciousness narrative structure and follows the character of Linda Hammerick as she comes of age. Linda remembers her childhood in Boiling Springs, North Carolina, in the 1970s and her relationships that follow, through college and beyond. Her present mingles with her past as she learns of her heritage and deals with death, sexual abuse, cancer, adoption, unwanted pregnancies, and family issues. Throughout all of these experiences, Linda lives with a secret extra sense, the ability to taste words, which she later discovers is a form of synesthesia.

== Characters ==
=== Linda Hammerick ===
Linda is the main character of the novel. She is a New York lawyer who grew up in Boiling Springs, North Carolina, and she has a form of synesthesia that causes her to taste words when she hears them. Part one of the book, "Confession," focuses heavily on her childhood, with details about her adult life interspersed. Linda tells the story of her best friend Kelly, her next door neighbor Wade, and her rapist, Kelly's cousin Bobby. She also reflects on her close relationship with her great-uncle, whom she and most other people call Baby Harper, as well as her relationship with her mother DeAnne and her father Thomas. It is made clear that Linda's childhood was traumatic in several ways. In part two of the book, "Revelation," we learn more about her long-term relationship with Leo, which is only briefly mentioned in the first half of the novel. She also has to grapple with the death of Baby Harper and the prospect of returning to Boiling Springs.

Linda's Vietnamese roots are not revealed until the very last scene of "Confession," when she is graduating from Yale and they call out her birth name: Linh-Dao Nguyen. At this point, several pieces of the puzzle that is Linda's life fall into place for the reader, and throughout the second half of the novel, she directly addresses the problems she faced as a Southerner who looked different than people thought she should.

=== Kelly Powell ===
Kelly is Linda's best friend from childhood. They begin exchanging letters when they are children, and they continue to do so even after Linda moves out of Boiling Springs. The two bond quickly because of their mutual obsession with Dolly Parton—which they swear to tell no one about—and the fact that they live on the same street. Linda reveals her synesthesia to Kelly when they are young, which shows how deeply Linda trusts her. Kelly and Linda both experience sexual abuse at the hands of Kelly's male cousin, Bobby. The two also share a childhood crush, a boy named Wade. Linda eventually dates Wade, although she conceals it from Kelly. When Kelly is a teenager, she becomes pregnant and leaves town, only revealing the father of the child—the pair's shared childhood crush, Wade—when Linda returns to Boiling Springs as an adult. Although they had grown apart since Linda moved to New York, they became closer again when she returned to Boiling Springs after the death of Baby Harper.

=== Baby Harper ===
Harper is Linda's uncle. She considers him to be her "first love", and he is the member of her family with whom she has the closest relationship. He is a mentor, confidante, and parental figure for Linda. Baby Harper is a photographer and has a collection of photo albums he calls H.E.B.s, which are filled with photos of everyone but himself. While she is living in New York City, Linda receives photo albums from Baby Harper that contain photos of him dressing up as a woman. Baby Harper was closeted for a long time and would always be the one taking the photos rather than being in them, so this is a very important moment in his character arc. Linda describes that Baby Harper wishes he "would have inhabited a body different from the one that God gave him." In a reflection of his dislike of his body, Baby Harper did not look at himself in the mirror, having only one small mirror in his Greek Revival house. Harper is closeted for most of the novel, but reveals to his family that he is gay when he begins seeing Boiling Springs's funeral director, Cecil. When he and Cecil die suddenly in a plane crash, Linda returns to Boiling Springs and is able to come to terms with his death.

=== DeAnne Hammerick ===
DeAnne is Linda's adopted mother. She has trouble accepting Linda as her own child. The two are estranged for most of the novel because Linda believes that Deanne knew of her rape but did nothing about it. By the end of the novel, DeAnne reveals the story of Linda's adoption, and the reasoning for her difficulty accepting Linda becomes more clear.

=== Thomas Hammerick ===
Thomas is Linda's adopted father who corresponds with her Vietnamese mother, Mai-Dao, after she leaves him to go back to her fiancé in Vietnam. Thomas takes Linda in after writing to her mother and learning of the conditions in Vietnam over a period of years during the war. He is also the one who gives Linda a book on the history of North Carolina that she often comes back to reference throughout her story.

=== Iris Burch Whatley ===
Iris is Linda's grandmother, Baby Harper's older sister, and DeAnne's mother. She died in 1987. Iris was known for never telling a lie, which fearfully kept the family together. Iris and Linda did not have a close or loving relationship.

=== Minor characters ===
Other characters in the novel include Linda's neighbor and childhood-crush Wade and longtime boyfriend Leopold "Leo" Thomas Benton.

== Plot ==
Bitter in the Mouth is a story told nonlinearly. The reader is given pieces of the puzzle of Linda's life, slowly accumulating information until the whole picture can be seen. The novel opens with an epigraph from To Kill a Mockingbird, immediately followed by the title of the first half of the novel—"Confession"—which focuses most heavily on Linda's childhood. The opening scene introduces Baby Harper, Linda's beloved uncle. Then Linda recalls the death of her grandmother, Iris. Linda is haunted by the words her grandmother spoke while on her deathbed: "What I know about you, little girl, would break you in two." In response to this, Linda simply says, "Bitch," a reflection of her tumultuous relationship with Iris that is later revealed to be rooted in Linda's ethnicity. Shortly after, Linda explains her form of synesthesia: she can taste words, both when she says them and when other people say them.

We are then introduced to her best friend, Kelly. She and Kelly are neighbors, and become friends after Kelly sends Linda a letter welcoming her to the neighborhood. Kelly is the only person that she tells about her synesthesia. They devise a plan together for Linda to smoke so that the "incomings"—the tastes she senses—are stifled in order for Linda to focus in school. The two share a childhood crush; they both like a boy named Wade, but Kelly calls "dibs" on him, so Linda is unable to talk about her feelings toward Wade. Linda and Kelly are also both sexually assaulted by the same person: Kelly's cousin, Bobby. Kelly's encounters with Bobby are known fairly early, but Linda reveals the details of her rape slowly as the novel progresses.

Linda has an extremely close relationship with her uncle, Baby Harper; he acts as a parental figure for her. Linda talks about her uncle's passion for photography, but he is never in any of the photos himself. He collects his photos in albums that he labels H.E.B.'s, his initials. Linda then goes into detail describing what Baby Harper told her about her father's family.

Wade is then brought into the novel through his conversations with Linda at the bus stop. Immediately after, the reader is alerted to the fact that adult Linda was in an 8-year relationship with a man named Leo, whom she never told about her synesthesia, a fact that alerts the reader to the state of their relationship. There are also more hints about her rape at the hands of Kelly's cousin, but the full story still isn't revealed.

Linda then talks about the relationship that develops between her and Wade. They begin dating in secret; Linda knows she can't tell Kelly, and says that her friendship with Kelly matters a lot more than a boy. Eventually, Wade asks Linda to have sex with him, but then Bobby "enters the room"—trauma from her rape haunts her, and she tells Wade no. Their relationship ends, and he moves away.

It is then revealed that Linda once tried to tell her mother about her synesthesia, but her mother told her that she wouldn't tolerate craziness in her family. This is a nod toward Linda's adoption, which had not yet been addressed—the statement meant that if Linda wanted to be accepted into DeAnne's family, she couldn't step out of line.

We then come to learn the intimate details of Linda's rape as she tells them to Baby Harper. Bobby would mow the lawn of Linda's house, and DeAnne flirted with him constantly. One day, when DeAnne left, Bobby asked to use the bathroom, and when Linda let him in he raped her. She was left with bruises on her neck and thighs. It is understood that her mother knew what happened, but instead of being there for Linda, she pretended that her daughter had gotten her period. Then, before Bobby was going to come back to mow again, he died. He crashed his car into a telephone pole, his head went through the windshield, and DeAnne went to the funeral. When Linda told Baby Harper the story, he got red paint, and they went to the cemetery together. There, they each painted the word "rapist" on a side of the headstone. After learning about her rape, we also learn about the death of Linda's father, Thomas. He died in his car in the driveway of his young secretary, whom he was having an affair with.

The next big event in the novel is when Kelly gets pregnant. She goes away for the duration of her pregnancy, and her aunt adopts her child. The father of the baby isn't revealed until late in the novel.

The first section of the novel ends with Baby Harper coming to Linda's graduation from Yale. As she walks across the stage and her name is read, her Vietnamese background is revealed; her full name is Lihn-Dao Nguyen Hammerick. Up to this point in the novel, her Vietnamese heritage is alluded to but never explicitly stated.

The second part of the novel is called "Revelation," and focuses more heavily on Linda's adult life (though both parts of the novel are nonlinear, so we continue to learn details about Linda's childhood in this part as well). The fact that Linda was adopted is stated clearly. Linda recalls a time that she accused her grandmother of disliking her; Iris simply said that didn't stop her from being Linda's grandmother.

The novel then jumps forward, and Linda reflects on when she found out she had ovarian cancer. She went to the doctor at the request of Leo, her long-term boyfriend turned fiancé. Leo wanted children, and when he found out Linda couldn't have any, he immediately moved out of their shared house and left her. Linda then reveals their backstory.

Adult Linda lives in New York City and works as an attorney at a law firm. While she's in New York, she stays in communication with her uncle, Baby Harper. He sends her four of his H.E.B.s, but it isn't explained what's in them until later. At this point, Baby Harper has come out to his family as gay—something that Linda suspected for a long time, but he never said to anyone outright—and is with a man named Cecil, who has a funeral home. The two travel together, and Linda receives updates on their travels. One day, Linda gets a call from her mother, and she finds out that Baby Harper and Cecil have died in a plane crash. When Linda finally works up the nerve to tell Leo, instead of simply comforting her and going back to Boiling Springs as she asked him to, he proposes. Linda says yes, even though she doesn't love him. Shortly after, the contents of the photo albums are revealed to the reader: it's a series of photos Baby Harper took of himself dressed in women's clothing. The photos start with him as a teenager and slowly become more curated and sophisticated as time passes.

Linda goes home six months after Baby Harper's death. She sees Kelly again, who is staying in Baby Harper's house. She and her mother work on their relationship; she shows DeAnne a PBS program about synesthesia that she herself watched, hoping that her mother would understand. DeAnne watched the program four times, a sign that she wants to heal her broken relationship with her daughter. Cecil's nephew and his partner take over Cecil's funeral home, and Kelly is asked to live in Baby Harper's house permanently. Then Kelly tells Linda that Wade is the father, and Linda asks if Kelly knew about her relationship with Wade. Each woman already knew about the other's secret.

The novel ends with the story of Linda's early childhood. Her mother tells her all the details. Thomas, Linda's father, met a woman named Mai-Dao when he was in New York City for law school. He fell in love with her, but Mai-Dao went back to Vietnam and married the man she'd been engaged to. They kept in touch by writing each other letters. Mai-Dao eventually moved into a trailer in Chapel Hill with her husband, Khanh. During this time, bad things were happening in Vietnam, and they were scared for their family there. Thomas offered his help, and Khanh found out and was very unhappy. Then, their trailer burned down, and Linda's biological parents died. Thomas immediately drove to Chapel Hill and took Linda. DeAnne, who had learned about Thomas's relationship with Mai-Dao, agreed to adopt Linda only if they never spoke of her birth parents again. The novel's closing lines are, "We all need a story of where we came from and how we got here. Otherwise, how could we ever put down our tender roots and stay." Linda finally gets the full story of her life, and the pieces of the puzzle fit together for her at the same time as they fit together for the reader. Linda is able to blend together her Southern Vietnamese and Southern American roots in order to create her own "South," and become authentically herself.

== Critical response ==
Critics have looked at the novel in terms of Linda's synesthesia, race, sexuality, and experiences with trauma. Justin Mellette states that Bitter in the Mouth is an essential Southern novel in which a multiplicity of voices joins beyond the black/white racial binary to encourage readers to consider the "Global South". Denise Cruz discusses the novel in terms of the queer and multiracial South in her article, "Monique Truong's Literary South and the Regional Forms of Asian America." The novel also sparked interest among literary food studies critics. Jennifer Ho looks closely at Linda's perceived race in a chapter in her Racial Ambiguity in Asian American Culture. In Eating Identities: Reading Food in Asian Literature, Wenying Xu explains "the inextricable involvement of food and sexuality" in novels by Monique Truong and Mei Ng, looking at Linda's synesthesia. In a chapter in a collection about food and literature, Lisa Hinrichsen writes about Truong's novel by looking at the subject of trauma and food in the story. In a review in the journal Gastronomica, Margot Kaminski describes how the novel uses Linda's synesthesia as a way to make her more unique. Even so, Kaminski argues that this uniqueness does not make it harder for readers to relate to her, but adds another dimension to "what it's like to be Linda."

Another major theme within the book deals with the old South's history of slavery. Initially, Linda mentions early in the book that her family, the Hammericks, rose to their status of wealth through the cotton industry which she then clarified that means they owned slaves. This fact is also key in helping build the narrative that Linda has racial privilege associated with old South money and helps to better mask the secret of her Asian ethnicity. She brings back the juxtaposition of slavery and affluence later within the book when referencing the dorm she lived in while attending Yale. She says that the building is still rumored to still maintain slave quarters from its historic past. All of these nods toward slavery and racial inequality help to better build the plot point of Linda's racial identity in the context of Boiling Springs, North Carolina. This narrative style forces readers to look deeper past what is written and avoid making assumptions at face value.

Linda's synesthesia is a clever tool used by Truong to describe the experiences of embodiment and trauma that many immigrants feel when they are racialized in America, specifically the South. The uncontrollable bombardment of tastes—good and bad—released at the will of others affects Linda in many ways that are beyond her control. The synesthesia forces her to recall specific memories, good, bad, and traumatic, so that she is never allowed to forget what specific events felt like. This "gift" keeps Linda from concentrating in school, and she tries smoking and other forms of tobacco to try and numb the tastes. This experience is reminiscent of wartime trauma that Linda experiences in her own body and the many ways victims try to numb the memories. Borders are being crossed violently in Linda's own personal space, which reflects the broader global issues that she experiences, but are bigger than herself, such as the Vietnam War and the life of an immigrant in the American South. Linda's synesthesia is employed as another example, in addition to her race and sex, of how she is made to feel "other" and exploited. In her 2016 essay "Double Consciousness of the South Asian Identity", Vandana Pawa discusses how it feels to be made an "other" in the American South and tells how she feels constantly exploited for her South Asian ethnicity and consumed by whiteness. In the same way that Linda's synesthesia is both gift and disability, she experiences the gift and disability of her ethnicity and race in whitewashed America and must come to terms with her various identities.

Book reviews in major newspapers were generally positive. In his review in The New York Times, Roy Hoffman called the book "a moving investigation of invented families and small-town subterfuge, a search for self heightened by the legacy of Vietnam and the flavors of language." In the Los Angeles Times, Diane Leach wrote, "Truong's bone is the outsider's plight, and her pen is a scalpel, laying perfect words down along that nerve until even the happiest reader understands what it means to forever stand apart from your family and the larger society you inhabit." Writing in The Boston Globe, Diane Wright called the novel "a beautifully written, complex story of self-discovery." In a less favorable review in the San Francisco Chronicle, Joan Frank observed, "Truong's writing is workmanlike, its energy sustained, and now and again it yields a lovely line: 'Another word for pray was wish, and only children wished.' But Linda's tone to me often sounded as if she were reciting a series of grievances, secure in the knowledge they will appall."

Bitter in the Mouth was selected as one of the 25 Best Fiction Books of 2010 by Barnes & Noble and was awarded as an Honor Book, Asian/Pacific American Awards for Literature by Asian Pacific American Librarians Association.

== Intertextual references ==
Linda references several real-world figures and works throughout her story. The novel is prefaced by a quotation from To Kill a Mockingbird by Harper Lee; Linda later discusses how she relates to the character of Scout. Linda makes consistent references to a history book entitled North Carolina Parade: Stories of History and People by Richard Gaither that was given to her by her father. The history of Virginia Dare and the Wright Brothers' first flight plays a prominent role in her thoughts throughout the novel. Another historical figure that Linda relates to is George Moses Horton; his poetry and life are mentioned several times in the novel. By adding her narrative into these Southern references, Truong stresses the importance of re-examining the "body" represented in Southern literature.
