= A Madman Dreams of Turing Machines =

Janna Levin book

- Author: Janna Levin
- Language: English
- Genre: Historical fiction
- Publisher: Knopf Doubleday Publishing Group
- Publication date: 2007
- Pages: 240
- ISBN: 9781-4000-32402
- OCLC: 173851874

A Madman Dreams of Turing Machines is a 2006 book by Janna Levin that contrasts fictionalized accounts of the lives and ideas of Kurt Gödel and Alan Turing (who never met). The book won several awards, including the PEN/Bingham Fellowship Prize for Writers and the MEA Mary Shelley Award for Outstanding Fictional Work. It was also a runner-up for the Hemingway Foundation/PEN Award.

== Description ==
A Madman Dreams of Turing Machines contrasts fictionalized accounts of the lives and ideas of the 20th-century mathematicians Kurt Gödel and Alan Turing, who never met in reality.

In an interview with Sylvie Myerson in The Brooklyn Rail, Levin said of her book: "There was a lot that made me want to write it as a novel, one being this whole idea that sometimes truth cannot come out as a theorem even in mathematics, let alone in a retelling of two people's lives. Sometimes you have to step outside of the perfect linear logic of biographical facts."
