= Lucia Perillo =

American poet

Lucia Maria Perillo (September 30, 1958 – October 16, 2016) was an American poet.

In 2000, Perillo was recognized with a "genius grant" as part of the MacArthur Fellows Program.

== Life and career ==
Perillo was born in Manhattan on September 30, 1958 and grew up in Irvington.

Her work appeared in The New Yorker, The Atlantic and The Kenyon Review, among other magazines. A traditional poet of mostly free-verse personal reflection, she wrote extensively about living with multiple sclerosis in her poems and essays. Time Will Clean the Carcass Bones was her last book of poetry (Copper Canyon Press, 2016). Her 2012 collection of short fiction, Happiness is a Chemical in the Brain, was shortlisted for the 2013 PEN/Robert W. Bingham Prize. She died on October 16, 2016, in Olympia, Washington, aged 58.

== Awards ==
- 1989 Samuel French Morse Award, Northeastern University Press
- 1990 Norma Farber First Book Award, Poetry Society of America for Dangerous Life
- 1991 PEN/Revson Award, Pen American Center, NY
- Purdue University's Emery Poetry Prize
- 1993 Illinois Arts Council Award for Creative Non-Fiction
- 1994 Finalist, National Poetry Series
- 1995 Verna Emery Poetry Prize, Purdue University Press
- 1995 Iowa Poetry Prize
- 1997 Kate Tufts Discovery Award
- 1997 Balcones Prize, Austin Community College for The Body Mutinies
- 1998 Chad Walsh Poetry Prize, The Beloit Poetry Journal
- 1998 Pushcart Prize for "Bad Boy Number Seventeen"
- 2000 MacArthur Fellows Program award
- 2003 Pushcart Prize for "Shrike Tree"
- 2005 Pushcart Prize for "In the Confessional Mode"
- 2006 Finalist, Los Angeles Times Book Prize
- 2010 Washington State Book Award for Inseminating the Elephant
- 2010 Bobbit Prize, Library of Congress for Inseminating the Elephant
- 2010 Pulitzer Prize in Poetry finalist for Inseminating the Elephant
- 2012 WA State Governor's Arts Medal
- 2012 Frank O'Connor International Short Story Award finalist for Happiness is a Chemical in the Brain
- 2013 PEN/Robert W. Bingham Prize finalist for Happiness is a Chemical in the Brain
- 2013 National Book Critics Circle Award finalist in Poetry for On the Spectrum of Possible Deaths
- 2013 Shelley Memorial Award
- 2013 Pacific Northwest Booksellers Association Award for On the Spectrum of Possible Deaths

== Bibliography ==
=== Poetry ===
Collections

- Dangerous life. Northeastern University Press. 1989.
- The Body Mutinies. Purdue University Press. 1996. ISBN 978-1-55753-083-7.
- The Oldest Map with the Name America: New and Selected Poems. Random House. 1999. ISBN 978-0-375-50160-9.
- Luck is luck: poems. Random House, Inc. 2005. ISBN 9781400063239.
- Inseminating the Elephant. Copper Canyon Press. 2009. ISBN 978-1-55659-291-1.
- On the Spectrum of Possible Deaths. Copper Canyon Press. 2012. ISBN 978-1-55659-397-0.
- Time Will Clean the Carcass Bones. Copper Canyon Press. 2016. ISBN 978-1-55659-473-1

List of poems

Title	Year	First published	Reprinted/collected
Blacktail	2014	"Blacktail". The New Yorker. 90 (24): 33. August 25, 2014.	
The News (A Manifesto)	1986	"The News (A Manifesto)" Ploughshares Issue 41 Winter 1986	Dangerous Life (1989), Time Will Clean the Carcass Bones (2016)
First Job/Seventeen	1986	"First Job/Seventeen" Ploughshares Vol 12, No. 4 1986	Dangerous Life (1989), Time Will Clean the Carcass Bones (2016)
Dangerous Life	1989	"Dangerous Life" Dangerous Life 1989	Time Will Clean the Carcass Bones (2016)
The Revelation	1989	"The Revelation" Dangerous Life 1989	Time Will Clean the Carcass Bones (2016)

=== Non-fiction ===
- I've Heard the Vultures Singing. Trinity University Press. 2007. ISBN 978-1-59534-031-3.

=== Fiction ===
- Happiness Is a Chemical in the Brain. W. W. Norton & Company. 2012. ISBN 9780393083538.
