= Arabelle Sicardi =

American feminist fashion and writer

- Born: 1993 (age 32–33)
- Education: Rutgers University
- Occupation: Writer
- Writing career
- Subjects: Fashion; beauty
- Website: www.arabellesicardi.com

Arabelle Sicardi (born 1993) is an American feminist fashion and beauty writer.

== Life and career ==
As a teenager, Sicardi launched a blog entitled Fashion Pirate, becoming "Tumblr's go-to fashion philosopher and beauty oracle." Sicardi has also been a staff writer at Rookie, beauty editor at BuzzFeed and a freelance writer for Refinery29, The Daily Beast, and Jezebel. Sicardi attended Rutgers University.

Jezebel calls Sicardi "a visionary young queer feminist;" Bustle says Sicardi is a "queer beauty icon." The Huffington Post named Sicardi's essay "Beauty is Broken" to its list of "The Most Important Writing from People of Color in 2015." Bust said Sicardi has a "uniquely awesome wardrobe aesthetic" and "a knack for mixing and matching pieces that somehow draw together the perfect balance of quirk and chic."

Sicardi is particularly known for turning a critical lens on beauty.

In 2014, Sicardi and collaborator Tayler Smith mounted a show called "Most Important Ugly" at American Two Shot. Bust said the two "make art that matters." One of the photographs from the show was "sampled" by Zak Arctander and appeared in an article in The New Yorker. Sicardi and Smith later claimed this was creative theft and have been the subject of controversy in regards to the legality of Arctander's actions versus the ethical implications.

Sicardi is nonbinary and uses they/them pronouns.
