= Yoon Choi =

Korean American writer

Yoon Choi is an American writer and author of Skinship, a 2021 short story collection published by Alfred A. Knopf that won several accolades and made several end-of-year lists. She was a Stegner Fellow at Stanford University and winner of the Whiting Award. Themes of her work include Korean and Korean American identity, language and translation, and family.

== Early life ==
Choi grew up in Long Island, New York and attended the Manhattan School of Music. Later, she attended Johns Hopkins University as an undergraduate student. She then briefly attended New York University for an MFA but instead returned to Johns Hopkins University to complete a one-year MA and spend a subsequent year teaching. There, she encountered writers like Stephen Dixon, who was her advisor, Alice McDermott, and Jean McGarry.

== Career ==
Choi's stories have been published in New England Review and other publications. Her story, "The Art of Losing", was chosen by Roxane Gay for The Best American Short Stories 2018.

In 2021, she published Skinship, her debut short story collection, which was selected by Ling Ma, Manuel Muñoz, and Oscar Villalon for the PEN/Robert W. Bingham Prize in 2022. In addition to several other accolades and mentions, it was also considered a best book of the year by several publications including Kirkus Reviews and NPR.

Choi was a Stegner Fellow in fiction at Stanford University from 2017 to 2019, as well as a 2024 Winner in Fiction for the Whiting Award.

== Personal life ==
Choi is based in Orange County, California where she lives with her husband and four children.
