= Rion Amilcar Scott =

American short story writer

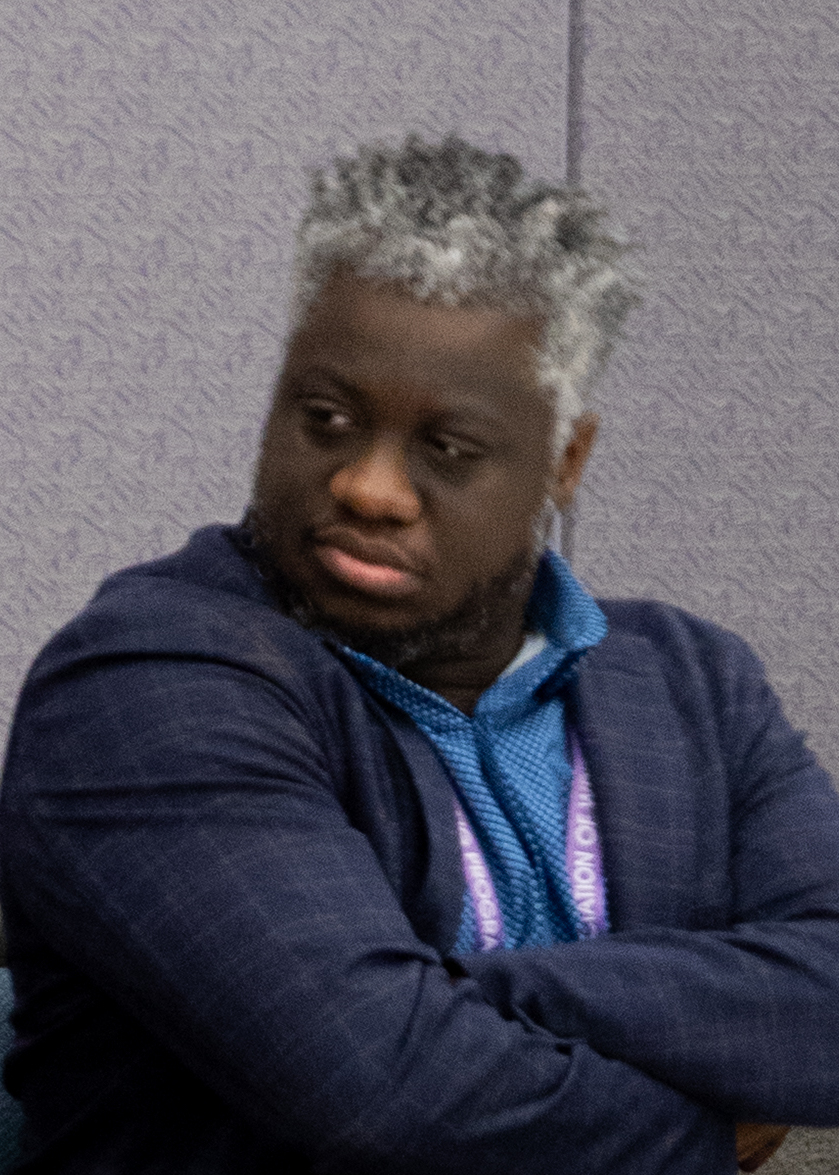
- Scott at AWP 2025
- Born: Washington, D.C.
- Writing career
- Genre: short story
- Notable awards: PEN/Robert W. Bingham Prize

Rion Amilcar Scott is an American short story writer. He won the PEN/Robert W. Bingham Prize for his 2016 book Insurrections.

== Life ==
Scott was born in Washington, D.C. and grew up in Silver Spring, Maryland. His parents are from Trinidad and came to the United States to study at Howard University. He graduated from George Mason University and teaches at The University of Maryland, College Park.

== Works ==
- Insurrections: Stories, Lexington, Kentucky: University Press of Kentucky, 2016. ISBN 9780813174402, OCLC 974471709
- The World Doesn't Require You, Liveright, 2019. ISBN 9781631495380
