= The City of Devi =

2013 novel by Manil Suri

- Author: Manil Suri
- Publisher: W. W. Norton & Company
- Publication date: February 4, 2013
- Pages: 352
- ISBN: 978-0-393-08875-5
- Preceded by: The Age of Shiva (2008)

The City of Devi is a 2013 novel by Manil Suri. In 2013, it won the Bad Sex in Fiction Award and the Bisexual Book Award for Fiction.

== Reception ==
=== Reviews ===
Kirkus Reviews described The City of Devi as "part international thriller, part romantic soap opera". They indicated that the "novel's driving force" is the "melodrama of romantic intrigue" and that the novel is "less satisfying than the author's previous works". On behalf of Booklist, Donna Seaman wrote, "By daringly yoking erotic longing with terrorism in a trinitarian tale of amped-up mythology and end-of-world chaos, Suri forges an incendiary love story and provocative improvisation on India's monumental epics."

Library Journal's Shirley N. Quan described Suri's writing as "smartly and fluidly written". Publishers Weekly also discussed Suri's writing style, calling it "dynamic" and "unabashed". They further indicated that the novel is "for the most part happily, perpetually off-balance and, though the tone is too unbound at times [...] the vibrancy and compelling plot carry through the occasional sag or inconsistency".

Quan concluded, "The strong plot and character development make the novel a page-turner, while insight into the taboos of interfaith and same-gender relationships in India and commentary on what true love really is add substance."

=== Awards and honors ===
Awards for The City of Devi
Year	Award	Result	Ref.
2013	Bad Sex in Fiction Award	Winner	
2013	Bisexual Book Award for Fiction	Winner	
2014	Lambda Literary Award for Gay Fiction	Finalist	
