= Barbara Tran =

American-Canadian poet (born 1968)

Barbara Tran (born 1968) is an American-born poet living in Canada. She received a Pushcart Prize in 1997.

== Career ==
Born in New York City, Tran received her BA from New York University and her MFA from Columbia University. She coedited the anthology Watermark: Vietnamese American Poetry and Prose (Asian American Writers' Workshop, 1998) and guest edited Viet Nam: Beyond the Frame, a special issue of Michigan Quarterly Review (Fall 2004).

She is the recipient of a Lannan Foundation Writing Residency, Bread Loaf Writers' Conference Scholarship, MacDowell Colony Fellowship, and Pushcart Prize, and is featured in filmmaker Yunah Hong's documentary Between the Lines: Asian American Women's Poetry.

Her poems have appeared in the Women's Review of Books, Ploughshares, and The New Yorker, as well as in the Williams College Museum of Art exhibit The Moon Is Broken: Photography from Poetry, Poetry from Photography.

Tran's first poetry collection, In the Mynah Bird's Own Words (Tupelo Press, 2002), was selected by Robert Wrigley as the winner of Tupelo Press's chapbook competition, and was a PEN/Open Book Award finalist.

In fall 2015, Tran was a writer-in-residence at Hedgebrook. She lives in Toronto.

== Awards and honors ==
Tran is a recipient of a Research and Creation grant and a Professional Development for Artists grant from the Canada Council, as well as a Literary Creation Project grant from the Ontario Arts Council.

She was longlisted for the 2018 CBC Nonfiction Prize.

Precedented Parenting was shortlisted for the Governor General's Award for English-language poetry at the 2024 Governor General's Awards.

== Works ==
- Tran, Barbara (1993). "Love and Rice". The Antioch Review. 51 (1): 91. doi:10.2307/4612672. JSTOR 4612672.
- Tran, Barbara (1997). "The Seamstress Cycle". Amerasia Journal. 23 (2): 171–176. doi:10.17953/amer.23.2.58q48hj603673135. ISSN 0044-7471.
- Tran, Barbara (1997). "from 'Rosary'". Ploughshares. 23 (1): 187–193. ISSN 0048-4474. JSTOR 40354753.
- Tran, Barbara; Truong, Monique T. D.; Luu, Truong Khoi, eds. (1998). Watermark: Vietnamese American Poetry and Prose. New York: Asian American Writers' Workshop. ISBN 1-889876-05-4. OCLC 39057048.
- Tran, Barbara (2002). In the Mynah Bird's Own Words. Dorset, Vermont: Tupelo Press. ISBN 0-9710310-5-3. OCLC 52139675. PEN/Open Book Award finalist.
- Tran, Barbara (2002). "Released". Mānoa. 14 (1): 49–50. ISSN 1045-7909. JSTOR 4230037.
- Tran, Barbara (July 2002). "Spider: Life after 1975". The Women's Review of Books. 19 (10–11): 21. doi:10.2307/4023887. JSTOR 4023887.
- Tran, Barbara, ed. (2004). "Introduction". Michigan Quarterly Review. 43 (4). hdl:2027/spo.act2080.0043.401. ISSN 0026-2420.
- Tran, Barbara (August 21, 2006). "Imaginary Menagerie". The New Yorker. p. 68.
- Tran, Barbara (2019). "Buttercups in Foil on the Windowsill". Ploughshares. 45 (4): 153. ISSN 0048-4474. JSTOR 26854701.
