= SPEAR Project =

The Standing Patrol for Emergency Assessment & Response (SPEAR) for emergency management, is an advisory unit activated for the purpose of rapidly providing relief authorities an estimate of the situation in disaster-affected areas. The Project was launched as a concept proposal by the Conceptium Group in 2004, an initiative taken by its founder, Stefan Templeton.

Teams that are trained and equipped for deep-field relief operations in conflict and/or disaster-affected areas are inserted to conduct rapid assessment and administer emergency aid. SPEAR teams support command and control with an information clearing house in three areas: hazard assessment, situational mapping, and communications from the field. SPEAR officers are assessment professionals who are trained in the sectoral needs of disaster-affected populations and maintain a state of readiness for immediate deployment to disaster-affected areas world-wide.

The goal of the SPEAR Project is the reduction of deaths and human suffering and the object is the improvement of the coordination of humanitarian actions and to allocate resources and labor in the most efficient way to relieve disaster situations as quickly as possible.

== See also ==
- Disaster Assistance Response Team
- Stefan Templeton
