= Monique Truong =

American novelist (born 1968)

- Monique T.D. Truong
- Born: May 13, 1968 (age 58); Saigon, South Vietnam
- Education: Yale University (BA); Columbia University School of Law (JD)
- Occupations: Writer, essayist
- Writing career
- Language: English
- Notable awards: Young Lions Fiction Award (2004); PEN/Robert W. Bingham Prize

Monique T.D. Truong (born May 13, 1968) is a Vietnamese American writer living in Brooklyn, New York. She graduated from Yale University and Columbia University School of Law. She has written multiple books, and her first novel, The Book of Salt, was published by Houghton-Mifflin in 2003. It was a national bestseller, and was awarded the 2003 Bard Fiction Prize and the Stonewall Book Award-Barbara Gittings Literature Award. She has also written Watermark: Vietnamese American Poetry & Prose, along with Barbara Tran and Luu Truong Khoi, and numerous essays and works of short fiction.

== Early life and education ==
Truong was born in Saigon, South Vietnam. In 1975, at the age of six, Truong and her mother left Vietnam for the United States as refugees of the Vietnam War. Her father, an executive for an international oil company, initially stayed behind for work but left the country after the fall of Saigon. The family lived in North Carolina, Ohio, and Texas.

Truong arrived in the United States in the summer of 1975. She lived with her family in Boiling Springs, North Carolina, which would later play an integral role in her writings. Truong describes her childhood and schooling experience in Boiling Springs as "exceedingly difficult and emotionally brutal." Truong experienced constant racism, discrimination, and bullying in her small town due to the fact that she was the only Vietnamese American child at her all-white elementary school.

Additionally, Truong credits her knowledge of the English language to Sesame Street. She learned English before she was enrolled in school but has stated that her accent was enough to have her placed in a class for children with speech impediments. Following these events and several others like this in her early life, Truong became familiar with the feeling of what it means to be the "other."

These critical experiences in her early life led to developments in her writings later in life, drawing inspiration from Boiling Springs and the feeling of being out of place. These places, ideas, and themes are all present in Truong's works.

Truong completed her undergraduate studies at Yale University, graduating in 1990 with a B.A. in literature. She earned a J.D. from Columbia University School of Law and went on to specialize in intellectual property law.

== Career ==
Truong co-edited the anthology Watermark: Vietnamese American Poetry & Prose (Asian American Writers Workshop, 1998) with Barbara Tran and Khoi Truong Luu.

Truong's first novel, The Book of Salt, published in 2003 by Houghton Mifflin Harcourt, takes place in post-World War I Paris, and tells the story of Binh, a Vietnamese cook who works for Gertrude Stein and Alice B. Toklas. The inspiration for the novel came from reading in The Alice B. Toklas Cookbook (1954) that Toklas and Stein had employed "Indo-Chinese" cooks. The novel explores themes of sexuality, diaspora, race, and national identity. The Book of Salt won numerous literary awards, including the New York Public Library Young Lions Fiction Award, the Bard Fiction Prize, and a Stonewall Book Award.

Her second novel, Bitter in the Mouth, published by Random House in 2010, tells the story of a Vietnamese-American adoptee growing up in the American South. The story's protagonist, Linda (also known as Linh-Dao), grapples with a life-long feeling of alienation informed by her race and synesthesia. Diane Leach wrote in The Los Angeles Times: "Monique Truong’s bone is the outsider’s plight, and her pen is a scalpel, laying perfect words down along that nerve until even the happiest reader understands what it means to forever stand apart from your family and the larger society you inhabit."

Truong's third novel The Sweetest Fruits (Viking, 2019) is a fictionalized recreation of the life of the Greek-Anglo Irish-Japanese writer Lafcadio Hearn, as told through the voices of three women in his life. It was named a best fiction book of 2019 by Publishers Weekly, Mental Floss, and PopMatters.

As of 2020, her novels have been translated into fourteen languages to date.

From 2011 to 2012, Truong wrote the food column, Ravenous, in T: The New York Times Style Magazine. She also received two James Beard Award nominations for contributing to Gourmet. Her essays on a variety of topics, including food, racism, the Vietnam War, and the American South, have appeared in The Wall Street Journal, O, The Oprah Magazine, The Washington Post, and The New York Times.

In collaboration with the composer/performer/sound artist Joan La Barbara, Truong has written the lyrics for a choral work and a song cycle, and is at work on a libretto for an opera inspired by Joseph Cornell and Virginia Woolf.

Truong serves on the Creative Advisory Council for Hedgebrook and the Board of Directors of the Authors Registry. As of 2024, she is an advisor for the Council of the Authors Guild after serving as its vice president beginning in 2018.

== Books ==
- Watermark: Vietnamese American Poetry & Prose, co-edited with Barbara Tran and Khoi Truong Luu (Asian American Writers' Workshop, 1998)
- The Book of Salt (Houghton-Mifflin, 2003)
  - New York Public Library Young Lions Fiction Award
  - Bard Fiction Prize
  - Stonewall Book Award-Barbara Gittings Literature Award
- Bitter in the Mouth (Random House, 2010)
  - Honor, Adult Fiction Asian/Pacific American Awards for Literature
- Vom Lasterleben am Kai, editor. (C.H. Beck, 2017)
- The Sweetest Fruits (Viking, 2019)

== Selected short fiction and essay publications ==
- Vietnam: Identities in Dialogue
- Bold Words: A Century of Asian American Writing
- An Interethnic Companion to Asian American Literature
- "Kelly"; "Notes to Dear Kelly", in Shawn Wong, ed., Asian American Literature: A Brief Introduction and Anthology (New York, Longman, 1995) pp. 288–293.
- "Kelly", in Amerasia Journal, 17.2 (1991)
- Yale University's The Vietnam Forum
- "Many Happy Returns", Food & Wine
- "My Father's Vietnam Syndrome," The New York Times
- "Why It's Every Person's Responsibility to Stand Up to Racism", O, The Oprah Magazine
- "The Hypocrisy of Eating at Mexican Restaurants," NPR's The Salt

== Honors ==
- Asian American Writers' Workshop Van Lier Fellowship
- Lannan Foundation Writing Residency
- Residencies at the Macdowell, Civitella Ranieri Foundation, Liguria Study Center, Yaddo, Hedgebrook, and the Fundacion Valparaiso
- 2020 John Gardner Fiction Book Award Winner for The Sweetest Fruits
- 2016 Sidney Harman Writer-in-Residence at Baruch College
- 2014–2015 U.S.-Japan Creative Artists Fellow in Tokyo
- 2012 Visiting Writer at the Helsinki Collegium for Advanced Studies
- 2011 American Academy of Art and Letters Rosenthal Family Foundation Award for Bitter in the Mouth
- 2010 Guggenheim Fellowship
- 2007 Princeton University Lewis Center for the Arts Hodder Fellowship
- 2004 New York Public Library Young Lions Fiction Award Winner for The Book of Salt
- 2004 Bard Fiction Prize for The Book of Salt
- 2004 PEN Oakland/Josephine Miles Award
- 2004 PEN/Robert W. Bingham Prize for The Book of Salt
- 2004 Stonewall Book Award—Barbara Gittings Literature Award for The Book of Salt
- 2021 Dos Passos Prize winner
