= Clare Beams =

American writer

- Born: 1981 or 1982 (age 43–44)
- Education: Columbia University (MFA)
- Occupations: Novelist; short story writer
- Children: 2
- Website: Official website

Clare Beams (born 1981 or 1982) is an American short story writer and novelist. She has published a collection of short stories and two novels, and her works are often about women's experiences.

== Life and career ==
Beams grew up in Connecticut. She graduated from Columbia University with an MFA in 2006. She taught high school English for nine years in Massachusetts, and later moved to Pittsburgh where she taught fiction at the Pittsburgh Center for the Arts. In 2014 she received a National Endowment for the Arts fellowship for prose. As of 2024 she teaches in the Randolph College MFA program. She and her husband have two daughters.

Beams' debut book, the short story collection We Show What We Have Learned, was published in 2016, and was listed by Kirkus Reviews as one of the best debut fiction books of that year. The review described it as a "richly imagined and impeccably crafted debut". Joyce Carol Oates described her as a "female/feminist voice for the 21st century". Reviews in The New York Times, the Star Tribune, the Pittsburgh Post-Gazette and Paste also praised the collection. The collection features themes of transformation and magical realism, and four of the nine stories are set in schools. It was a finalist for the PEN/Robert W. Bingham Prize, the Young Lions Fiction Award and the Shirley Jackson Award for best collection.

She was writer in residence at Bard College in 2020, having received the Bard Fiction Prize for We Show What We Have Learned. In the same year she published her first novel, The Illness Lesson. Set in 19th century Massachusetts, the novel is about an illness affecting a school of young women. It was described by The Washington Post as "Louisa May Alcott meets Shirley Jackson, with a splash of Margaret Atwood", and by The New York Times as "astoundingly original". It was longlisted for the Center for Fiction First Novel Prize.

Beams' second novel The Garden was published in 2024, and she has said it was inspired by the history of diethylstilbestrol, a drug prescribed to pregnant women in the mistaken belief that it would prevent miscarriage but that instead caused serious adverse side effects. The New York Times observed that "the genius of the novel is the way Beams continually intertwines fictional elements with true-to-life obstetric practices". The Pittsburgh Post-Gazette noted that "like her previous work, [Beam] writes with her eyes wide open, completely unafraid to embrace the macabre". She is the 2023-24 Walton Visiting Writer in Fiction at the University of Arkansas.

== Works ==
- We Show What We Have Learned (short story collection, Lookout Books, 2016)
- The Illness Lesson (novel, Doubleday, 2020)
- The Garden (novel, Doubleday, 2024)
