= Jac Jemc =

American horror fiction writer

- Education: MFA
- Alma mater: Art Institute of Chicago

Jac Jemc is an American fiction writer. In 2023 she was named a Guggenheim Fellow in Fiction. She was a finalist for the 2013 PEN/Robert W. Bingham Prize and did win the Paula Anderson Book Award. Jemc was awarded two Illinois Arts Council Grants. In 2014 Jemc was among a list of 25 Writers to Watch by the Guild Literary Complex. Her stories have been published in a number of magazines including Guernica, LA Review of Books, and The Southwest Review. She has been the writer in residence for a number of locations including the University of Notre Dame and The Danish Center for Writers and Translators.

Jemc completed her M.F.A at the Art Institute of Chicago and now teaches for University of California San Diego. She previously worked for Northeastern Illinois University. Jemc worked for Hobart as their web nonfiction editor.

== Bibliography ==
- My Only Wife, 2012
- A Different Bed Every Time, 2014
- The Grip of It, 2017
- False Bingo: Stories, 2019
- Empty Theatre, 2023
