= The Death of Vishnu =

2001 novel by Indian-American writer Manil Suri

- Author: Manil Suri
- Language: English
- Genre: Philosophical novel
- Publisher: W. W. Norton & Company
- Publication date: 2001
- Publication place: United States
- Media type: Print (hardcover)
- Pages: 295 pp (US hardcover edition)
- ISBN: 0-393-05042-4 (US hardcover edition)
- OCLC: 44676012
- Dewey Decimal: 813/.6 21
- LC Class: PS3569.U725 D43 2001

The Death of Vishnu (2001) is a novel by Indian-American writer Manil Suri. The book is about the spiritual journey of a dying man named Vishnu living on a landing of a Bombay apartment building, as well as the lives of the residents living in the building.

== Awards and honors ==
- 2001 Barnes & Noble Discover Great New Writers Award, winner
- 2001 Booker Prize, longlist
- 2001 Kiriyama Prize, finalist (fiction)
- 2002 McKitterick Prize, winner
- 2002 PEN/Robert W. Bingham Prize, co-winner
- 2002 PEN/Faulkner Award, nominee
- 2002 ALA Notable Books for Adults
