= Sergio De La Pava =

American novelist and lawyer

Sergio de la Pava
- De La Pava in 2026
- Born: 1970 or 1971 (age 55–56); New Jersey
- Occupations: Writer, lawyer
- Website: sergiodelapava.com

Sergio de la Pava (born 1970/71) is an American novelist and lawyer. He is best known for his novel A Naked Singularity.

== Biography ==
Sergio de la Pava was born and raised in New Jersey, to parents who immigrated from Colombia. He studied philosophy at Rutgers University and then attended Brooklyn Law School, where he met his wife. They live in New Jersey with their two children.

He works as a public defender in Manhattan, where he handles 70 to 80 cases at a time. He says of that work, "The stakes are a lot higher in that world than whether or not my book gets attention. On a given day, I have someone who really needs my help on a serious matter."

== Career ==
In 2008, De La Pava self-published his first novel, A Naked Singularity, through XLibris. In October 2010, literary site The Quarterly Conversation ran a review by Scott Bryan Wilson that called the book "one of the best and most original novels of the decade" and "a towering, impressive work." That review caught the eye of staff at University of Chicago Press, who signed the book up and published it in paperback in April 2012. The book was named one of the ten best works of fiction of 2012 by The Wall Street Journal. In the Chicago Tribune, Julia Keller wrote, "A Naked Singularity is not about physics. It's about the American criminal justice system in a large and chaotic city, a place slowly crushed by hopelessness in the same way that an ancient star is gradually crushed by gravity. . . . It is about a city that teeters on the edge of total collapse and complete disaster, but that has the capacity to right itself (whew!) at the last possible second." A Naked Singularity went on to win the PEN/Robert W. Bingham Prize from PEN America as the best debut novel of that year. On February 10, 2014, it was named one of eight books on the shortlist for the inaugural Folio Prize for the best book published in the United Kingdom in 2013.

In April 2011, De La Pava self-published his second novel, Personae. The University of Chicago Press published a new paperback edition of that book in September 2013. In The Wall Street Journal, Sam Sacks wrote, "[I]n this willfully cryptic book, Mr. De La Pava's sense of moral urgency is ever-present. In only his early 40s, he is already a writer of mercurial brilliance, and even his strangest detours are worth following." Bookforum called it " the most galvanizing meditation on the possibilities and ramifications of artistic process that I have read in recent memory."

In May 2018, De La Pava published the novel Lost Empress. In the Wall Street Journal Sam Sacks praised it as "Half farce, half serious social novel, half compendium of meditations on everything from Joni Mitchell’s early albums to the superiority of football’s 4-3 defensive alignment. That’s three halves, but as with A Naked Singularity, Lost Empress feels bigger than a single book.". Jonathan Dee in the New Yorker called it "hilariously profane" and "thrilling."

In November 2024, De La Pava published the novel Every Arc Bends Its Radian, which Vanity Fair called "a roiling, noirish, existential explosion of a novel.". Dwyer Murphy in the New York Times Book Review wrote, "De La Pava’s commitment to ideas — their creation and their interrogation — is so fervid that it lights up his prose."

== Works ==
=== Novels ===
- —— (2008). A Naked Singularity (paperback 1st ed.). Xlibris. ISBN 9781436341981.
- —— (2011). Personae (paperback 1st ed.). Xlibris. ISBN 9781456876968.
- —— (2018). Lost Empress (hardcover 1st ed.). New York: Pantheon. ISBN 9781524747220.
- —— (2024). Every Arc Bends its Radian (hardcover 1st ed.). New York: Simon & Schuster. ISBN 9781668056707.

=== Publisher prints ===
A Naked Singularity and Personnae were originally self-published through Xlibris. University of Chicago Press later released editions.

- —— (2012). A Naked Singularity (paperback ed.). Chicago: University of Chicago Press. ISBN 9780226141794.
- —— (2013). Personae (paperback ed.). Chicago: University of Chicago Press. ISBN 9780226078991.

=== Articles ===
- 2010: "A Day's Sail", published by Triple Canopy
