= Manil Suri =

American novelist (born 1959)

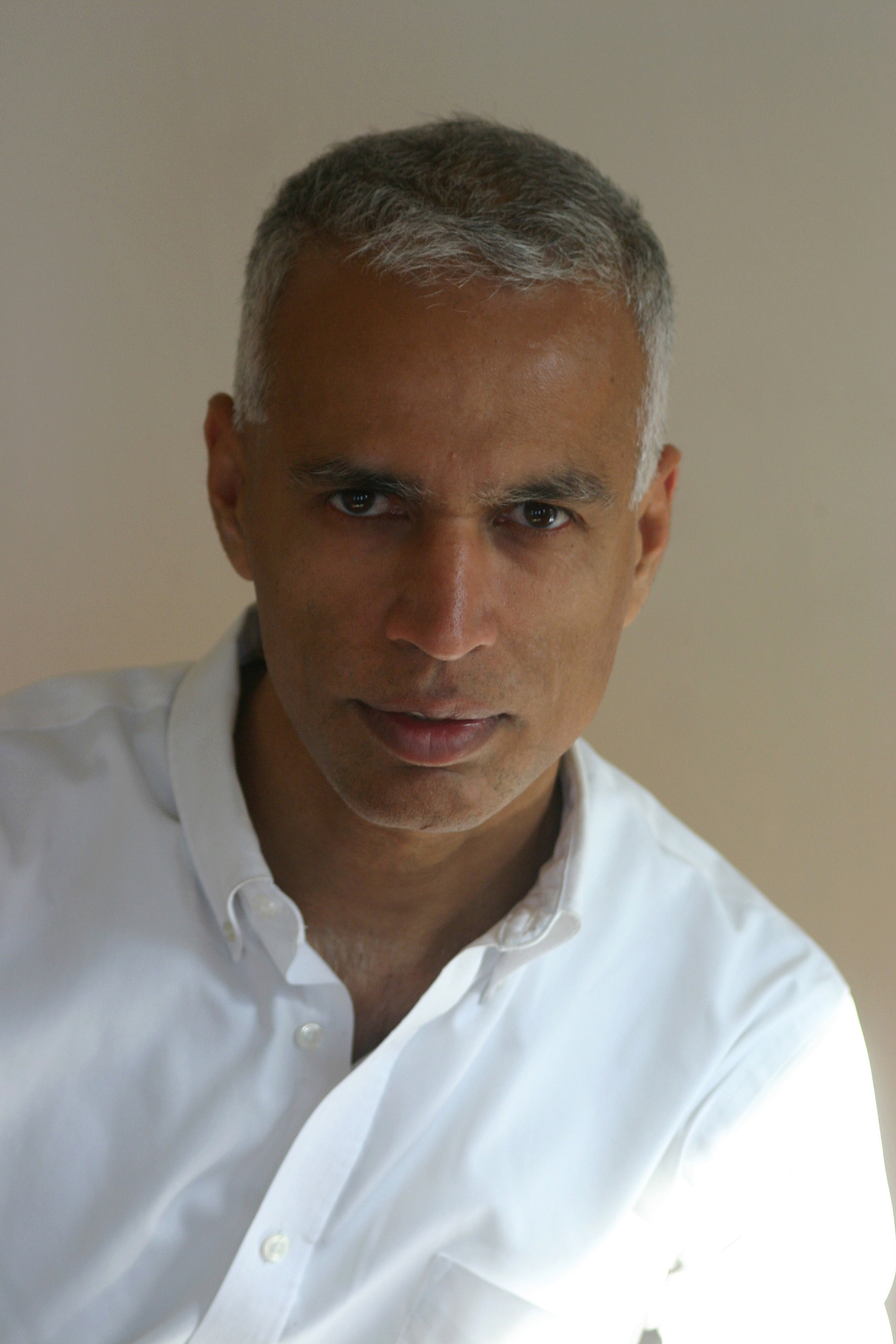
- Born: July 1959 (age 67); Bombay, India
- Education: Campion School Bombay; University of Bombay; Carnegie Mellon University (PhD)
- Occupations: Novelist, mathematician
- Website: manilsuri.com

Manil Suri (born July 1959) is an Indian-American mathematician and writer of a trilogy of novels all named for Hindu gods. His first novel, The Death of Vishnu (2001), which was long-listed for the 2001 Booker Prize, short-listed for the 2002 PEN/Faulkner Award and won the Barnes & Noble Discover Prize that year. Since then, he has published two more novels, The Age of Shiva (2008) and The City of Devi (2013), completing the trilogy.

== Biography ==
Suri was born in Bombay, the son of R.L. Suri, a Bollywood music director, and Prem Suri, a schoolteacher. He attended the University of Bombay before moving to the United States, where he attended Carnegie Mellon University. He received a Ph.D. in mathematics in 1983, and became a mathematics professor at University of Maryland, Baltimore County. Suri began writing short stories in the 1980s during his spare time, but none were published. In 1995 he began writing The Death of Vishnu, a novel about social and religious tensions in India taking place in an apartment building in contemporary Mumbai. An excerpt, "The Seven Circles", appeared in The New Yorker and the novel was published in 2001, becoming an international bestseller. Suri received a six-figure advance as a result of a bidding war between publishing houses, ultimately won by W.W. Norton. In 2002, Suri won the PEN/Robert W. Bingham Prize for The Death of Vishnu. His second novel, The Age of Shiva (2008), was listed as one of the best books of the decade by About.com. His third novel, The City of Devi (2013), was ranked number 12 in the 50 essential works of LGBT fiction list by Flavorwire.

Suri was planning to write a trilogy of novels with titles featuring the three Hindu gods Brahma, Vishnu and Shiva. The second book in the trilogy, The Age of Shiva, was published in 2008, with The Birth of Brahma slated as the third. This third novel ended up being based on Devi (the Mother Goddess) instead, with the title The City of Devi.

In December 2013, Suri won the "Bad Sex in Fiction" prize for the climactic sex scene in The City of Devi. However, a reviewer in the Wall Street Journal praised the sex writing in the book, as did a reviewer in The Times Literary Supplement, who also commented that Suri "admirably" handles the strands of "sex, mythology and global politics".

Suri has written an essay about growing up gay in India in the journal Granta and has published op-eds about gay issues in the New York Times and the Washington Post.

== Books ==
- The Death of Vishnu: A Novel (W. W. Norton, 2001)
- The Age of Shiva: A Novel (W. W. Norton, 2008)
- The City of Devi: A Novel (W. W. Norton, 2013)
- The Big Bang of Numbers: How to Build the Universe Using Only Math: (W.W. Norton, 2022)
