= Carolyn Cooke =

American short story writer and novelist

- Born: Mount Desert Island, Maine
- Education: Smith College; Columbia University
- Occupations: Writer and educator
- Notable work: The Bostons; Daughters of the Revolution; Amor and Psycho
- Spouse: Randall Babtkis
- Awards: PEN/Robert W. Bingham Prize

Carolyn Cooke is an American short story writer and novelist.

== Early life ==
Carolyn Cooke was born on Mount Desert Island in Maine. Cooke graduated with a BA from Smith College, following which she worked as a magazine editor in New York City for publications including Penthouse, OMNI, and Avenue. She then earned a Master of Fine Arts degree from Columbia University.

== Career ==
Cooke is currently a professor in the Department of Interdisciplinary Arts MFA Program at California Institute of Integral Studies in San Francisco, where she co-directs the Center for Transformative Media. She has received fellowships from the National Endowment for the Arts and the California Arts Council. Cooke's stories have appeared in numerous publications including AGNI, New England Review, The Paris Review, Ploughshares, and in two volumes each of Best American Short Stories and Prize Stories: The O. Henry Awards. The Bostons, Cooke's first collection of short stories (2001) won the PEN/Robert W. Bingham Prize (2002) for a first book and was cited as a New York Times Notable Book of the Year. The book contained nine interconnected short stories. Kirkus Reviews said of Cooke's debut work that her "attractive voice alternately thrusts bluntly and lilts poetically".

Her 2011 novel, Daughters of the Revolution, was a finalist for the Flaherty Dunnan First Novel Prize and was named one of the top ten books of the year by the San Francisco Chronicle and was among the Reviewers' Favorite books of 2011 by The New Yorker magazine. The book is set between 1963 and 2005, and explores issues of class against the backdrop of the sexual and political revolutions during the era.

In 2013, Cooke's third book, a collection of 11 stories collectively titled Amor and Psycho, was published by Alfred A. Knopf. The majority of the stories are set in and around San Francisco and New York City. In reviewing the book, critic Georgia Rowe referred to Cooke as one of America's "finest short-story writers". In 2019, Cooke wrote five episodes of Die Testament, a 65-episode "soapie" for Netwerk 24 in South Africa.

== Personal life ==
Cooke was married to her husband, poet Randall Babtkis, in 1987.

== Works ==
- Amor and Psycho. Penguin Random House. 2013.
- Daughters of the Revolution. Alfred A. Knopf. 2011. ISBN 978-0-307-59473-0.
- The Bostons. Houghton Mifflin Harcourt. 2001. ISBN 978-0-618-01768-3.
- What the Millions Want: Stories, Columbia University, 1986

=== O. Henry Award ===
- Larry Dark, ed. (September 15, 1997). Prize Stories 1997: The O. Henry Awards. Anchor. ISBN 978-0-385-48361-2.
- Larry Dark; Andrea Barrett, eds. (September 15, 1998). Prize Stories 1998 Pen/O. Henry Prize Stories. Anchor. ISBN 978-0-385-48958-4.

=== Best American Short Stories ===
- The Best American Short Stories 1997
- Sue Miller; Katrina Kenison, eds. (October 15, 2002). The Best American Short Stories 2002. Mariner Books. ISBN 978-0-618-13173-0.
- Walter Mosley; Katrina Kenison, eds. (2003). The Best American Short Stories 2003. Houghton Mifflin Harcourt. ISBN 978-0-618-19733-0. "Carolyn Cooke best american."
- Michael Chabon; Katrina Kenison, eds. (October 5, 2005). The Best American Short Stories 2005. Mariner Books. ISBN 978-0-618-42705-5.
