= Shawn Vestal =

American writer

Shawn Vestal is an American author based in the state of Washington. He is best known for his collection of short stories, Godforsaken Idaho, which earned him the PEN Robert W. Bingham Prize in 2014. He currently lives in Spokane where he served as a columnist for The Spokesman-Review. He retired from the newspaper in March 2024. He and his wife Amy Cabe have a son, Cole Vestal.

== Bibliography ==
- Godforsaken Idaho (2013) Little A/New Harvest ISBN 0544027760
- Daredevils (2016) Penguin Press ISBN 1101979895
