= David Matthews (author) =

American author (born 1967)

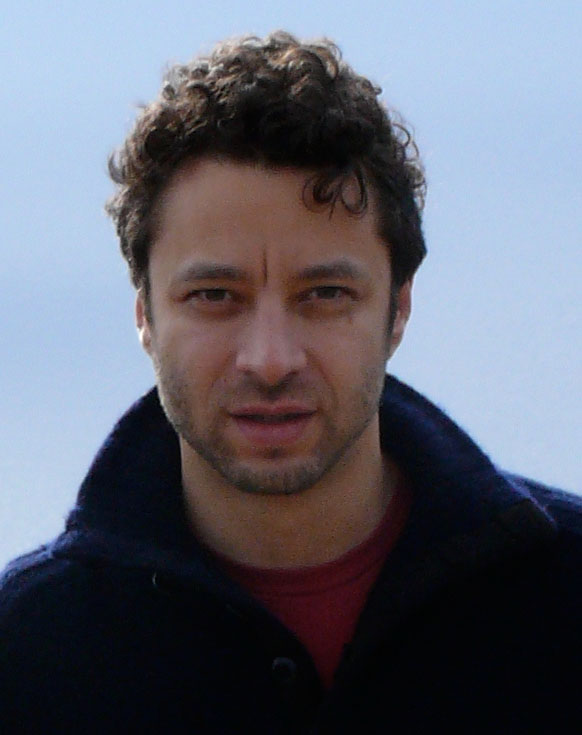
David Matthews

David Matthews is an American author. Matthews is of African-American and Jewish descent. His memoir Ace of Spades recounts his experience growing up in the Baltimore, Maryland area as a biracial child who could pass for white.

== Early life and education ==
Matthews' Jewish mother had schizophrenia and left his father when Matthews was only a few months old. As a result, Matthews was raised by his father, Ralph Matthews Jr., an African-American journalist who counted Malcolm X and James Baldwin among his friends. After living in the Maryland suburbs of Washington, D.C., the Matthews family moved to the segregated Bolton Hill area of Baltimore in 1977. Bolton Hill was a tiny enclave of rich, white families surrounded by the primarily black ghetto of west Baltimore. Matthews' memoir states that initially, he did not fit in with either the black children or the white children in his public elementary school. He chose to "pass" as white.

Matthews attended Baltimore City College High School, where he "passed" as white and self-identified as Jewish. Lacking any cultural knowledge of Jewish life, Matthews was not accepted as a Jew and continued to search for an identity.

== Career ==
Matthews is the author of two non-fiction books. His first, Ace of Spades (2007), is an autobiographical memoir about his experience as a biracial person growing up in Baltimore. Ace of Spades is presented in a somewhat acerbic coming-of-age literary style.

Matthews' second book, Kicking Ass and Saving Souls (2011), follows the adventurous life of Stefan Templeton.

Matthews' work has appeared in The New York Times, Salon, and The Huffington Post. He has contributed to "The Autobiographers Handbook". He also penned an introduction to the Paris Review edition of The Catcher in the Rye.

Matthews' television credits include Law & Order: Los Angeles; Law & Order: Special Victims Unit; HBO's Boardwalk Empire; F/X's Tyrant; and HBO's Vinyl.

== See also ==
- Stefan Templeton
