= The Best American Short Stories 2018 =

- First edition
- Editor: Roxane Gay and Heidi Pitlor
- Language: English
- Series: The Best American Short Stories
- Publisher: Houghton Mifflin Harcourt
- Media type: Print (hardback & paperback)
- ISBN: 9780547868868 (paperback)
- Preceded by: The Best American Short Stories 2017
- Followed by: The Best American Short Stories 2019

The Best American Short Stories 2018, a volume in the Best American Short Stories series, was edited by Heidi Pitlor and by guest editor Roxane Gay.

== Short stories included ==
Author	Story	Where story previously appeared
Maria Anderson	"Cougar"	The Iowa Review
Jamel Brinkley	"A Family"	Gulf Coast
Yoon Choi	"The Art of Losing"	New England Review
Emma Cline	"Los Angeles"	Granta
Alicia Elliott	"Unearth"	Grain
Danielle Evans	"Boys Go to Jupiter"	The Sewanee Review
Carolyn Ferrell	"A History of China"	Ploughshares: Solos Omnibus
Ann Glaviano	"Come on, Silver"	Tin House
Jacob Guajardo	"What Got Into Us"	Passages North
Cristina Henríquez	"Everything Is Far From Here"	The New Yorker
Kristen Iskandrian	"Good with Boys"	ZYZZYVA
Jocelyn Nicole Johnson	"Control Negro"	Guernica
Matthew Lyons	"The Brothers Brujo"	Tough
Dina Nayeri	"A Big True"	The Southern Review
Téa Obreht	"Items Awaiting Protective Enclosure"	Zoetrope
Ron Rash	"The Baptism"	The Southern Review
Amy Silverberg	"Suburbia!"	The Southern Review
Curtis Sittenfeld	"The Prairie Wife"	The New Yorker
Rivers Solomon	"Whose Heart I Long to Stop with the Click of a Revolver"	Emrys Journal
Esmé Weijun Wang	"What Terrible Thing It Was"	Granta
