= Stefan Templeton =

R. Stefan Templeton is the founder of the SPEAR Project (Standing Patrol for Emergency Assessment and Response and Studio 2412.

== Humanitarian missions ==
Ten days after the tsunami that ensued due to the 2004 Indian Ocean earthquake, Templeton helped insert 27 medical personnel in Aceh Jaya (Indonesia) to conduct emergency assessment and coordinate delivery of supplies with the support of Newmont Mining Corporation CEO Richard Ness. Templeton flew 24 surveillance and GPS mapping missions in order to provide geo-referenced intelligence to the UNJLC. Between January 5 and February 14, 2005, the team completed a pediatric vaccination campaign of 3,150 children.

In March 2007 and November 2007, in collaboration with the Kush Organization and the U.S. Institute of Peace, Templeton conducted missions in Abyei province in Southern Kordofan (Southern Sudan) to assess the situation in Agok, with special emphasis on analyzing water supply. An evacuation plan based on access to drinking water was set up in preparation for what seemed to be an imminent attack by Janjaweed forces. The mission was documented by writer David Matthews, who was writing a feature article for The Washington Post. When Abyei Town was attacked and destroyed by SAF forces on May 14, 2008, the evacuation plan was implemented.

== See also ==
- SPEAR Project
