= Janna Levin =

American theoretical cosmologist

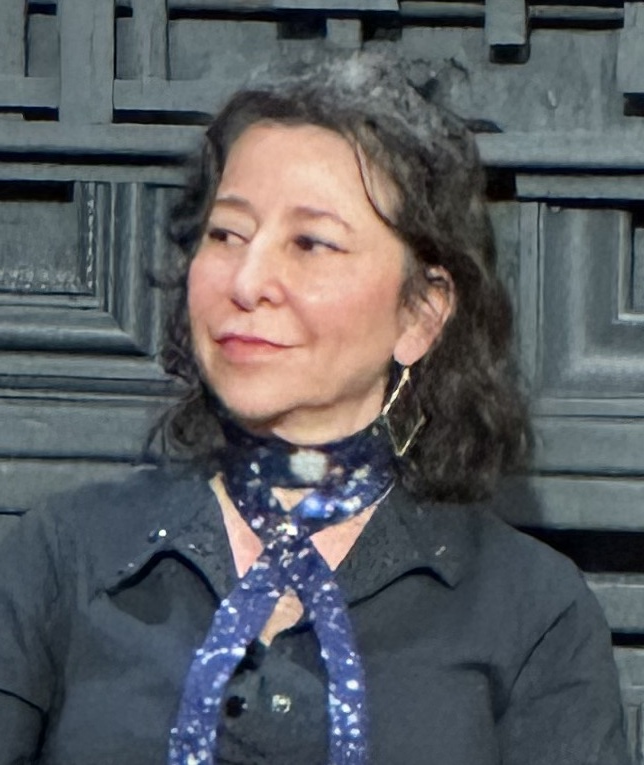
- Levin at the 2024 Sundance Film Festival
- Born: 1967 (age 58–59); Texas, U.S.
- Education: Barnard College 1988; Massachusetts Institute of Technology 1993
- Known for: A Madman Dreams of Turing Machines
- Children: 2
- Awards: Guggenheim Fellow 2012
- Scientific career
- Fields: Cosmology; Black holes; Gravitational waves
- Workplaces: Barnard College
- Thesis: MAD Gravity and the Early Universe: a Possible New Resolution to the Horizon and Monopole Problems (1993)
- Doctoral advisor: Katherine Freese

Janna J. Levin (born 1967) is an American theoretical cosmologist and a professor of physics and astronomy at Barnard College. She earned a Bachelor of Arts in astronomy and physics with a concentration in philosophy at Barnard College in 1988 and a PhD in theoretical physics at the Massachusetts Institute of Technology in 1993. Much of her work deals with looking for evidence to support the proposal that our universe might be finite in size due to its having a nontrivial topology. Other work includes black holes and chaos theory. She joined the faculty at Barnard College in January 2004 and is currently the Claire Tow Professor of Physics and Astronomy.

== Biography ==
Levin was born to Yiddish-speaking Jewish parents in Texas. Her grandparents were immigrants from eastern Europe, who eventually gave up keeping Kashrut. She describes her household as mostly not religious (Levin was not brought to synagogue and was not bat mitzvahed). Levin attended Columbia University for her bachelor's degree and MIT for her Ph.D., graduating in 1993. In 2002 she held a research fellowship at Cambridge University (England).

Janna Levin is a professor of physics and astronomy at Barnard College of Columbia University with a grant from the Tow Foundation. She researches black holes, the cosmology of extra dimensions, and gravitational waves in the shape of spacetime. In addition she is the director of sciences at Pioneer Works.

Levin is the author of the popular science book How the Universe Got Its Spots: Diary of a Finite Time in a Finite Space. In 2006, she published A Madman Dreams of Turing Machines, a novel of ideas recounting the lives and deaths of Kurt Gödel and Alan Turing.

Levin has written a series of essays to accompany exhibitions at several galleries in England, including the Ruskin School of Drawing and Fine Art and the Hayward Gallery. Levin was featured on Talk of the Nation on July 12, 2002. She appeared as a guest on Stephen Colbert's Comedy Central show The Colbert Report on August 24, 2006. She also appeared as the featured guest on the Speaking of Faith radio show on February 22, 2009, where she discussed her book A Madman Dreams of Turing Machines with the show's host Krista Tippett. Levin presented "The sound the universe makes" on TED.com on March 1, 2011. She was named a Guggenheim Fellow in 2012.

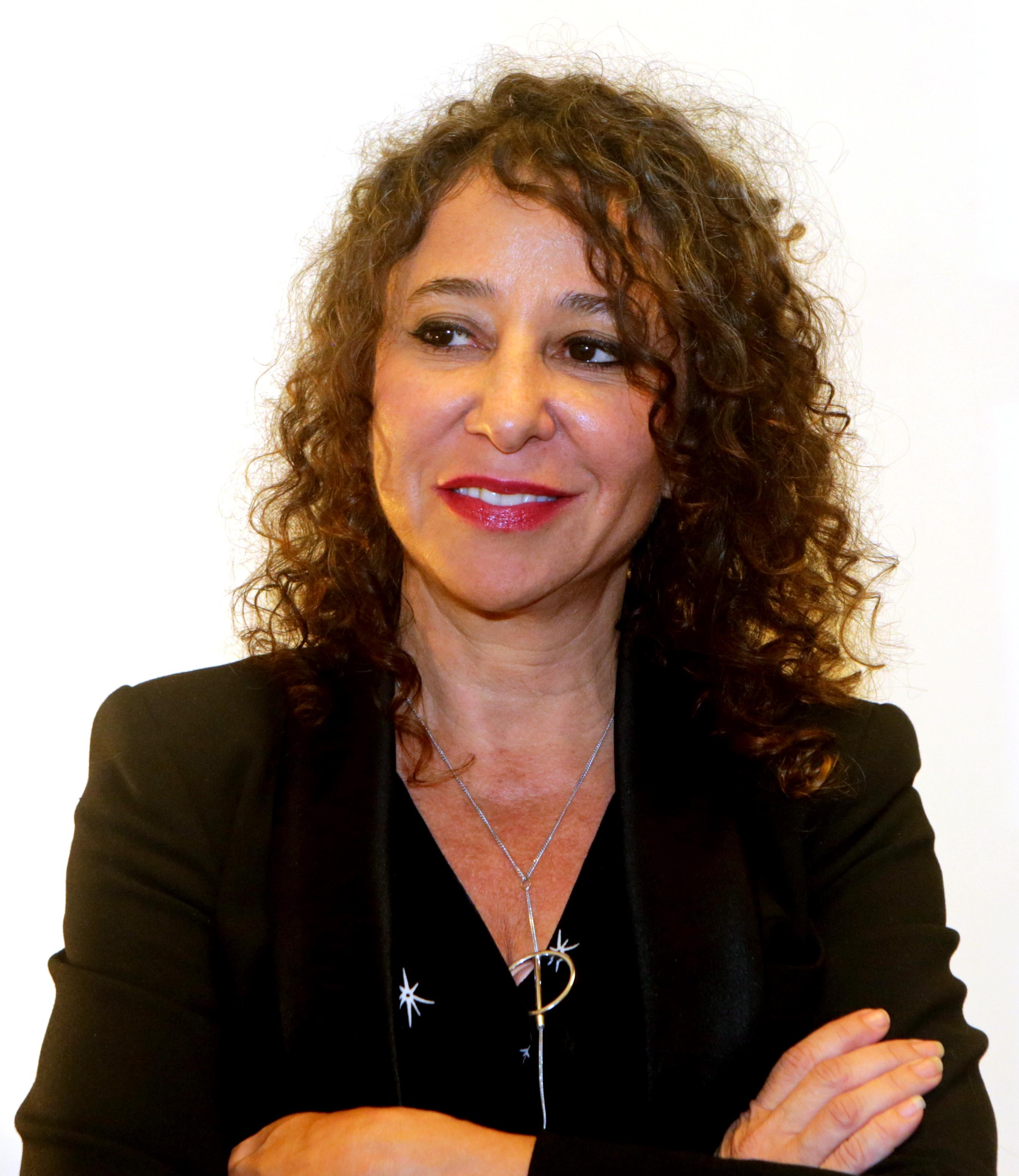
Levin in 2019

Her book Black Hole Blues and Other Songs from Outer Space was published in March, 2016. The book is about the history of the Laser Interferometer Gravitational-Wave Observatory and the 2015 discovery of gravitational waves. In a review of the book published in The Wall Street Journal, British astrophysicist John Gribbin wrote, "This is a splendid book that I recommend to anyone with an interest in how science works and in the power of human imagination and ability." In January 2018 she hosted Nova's award-winning episode "Black Hole Apocalypse."

== Personal life ==
Levin did not officially graduate from high school, as she was in a serious car accident and hospitalized for a time.

Levin is the parent of two children, a son born in 2004 and a daughter born in 2007. Her partner, Warren, is a musician.

== Bibliography ==
- How the Universe Got Its Spots: Diary of a Finite Time in a Finite Space, Orion Publishing Group, 2002
- A Madman Dreams of Turing Machines, Anchor, 2009
- Black Hole Blues and Other Songs from Outer Space, Knopf, 2016
- Black Hole Survival Guide, Knopf, 2020
