= Lenny Letter =

Feminist newsletter founded by Lena Dunham and Jenni Konner

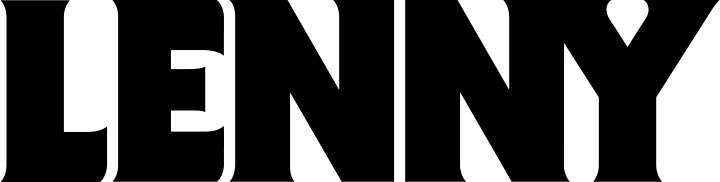
- Editor: Jessica Grose
- Deputy Editor: Laia Garcia
- Editor at Large: Mikki Halpin
- Publisher: Condé Nast
- Founder: Lena Dunham; Jennifer Konner
- Founded: 2015
- First issue: October 23, 2015
- Final issue: October 19, 2018
- Country: United States
- Language: English
- Website: LennyLetter.com

Lenny Letter, also known as Lenny, was a weekly online feminist newsletter created by Lena Dunham and Jennifer Konner. Lenny also had a book imprint called Lenny Books on Random House. It was shut down in October 2018.

== History ==
In September 2015, Dunham and Konner started Lenny Letter as a self-funded project that would give a platform to young female voices to discuss feminist issues. The newsletter featured political essays, personal stories, interviews, artwork and even an advice column from Dunham and Konner themselves called "Letters to Lenny". Benjamin Cooley was the CEO. Laia Garcia was made deputy editor in July 2015.

Notable articles include an essay written by actress Jennifer Lawrence about the gender wage gap in Hollywood; one written by singer Alicia Keys about her decision to start wearing little to no make-up; and another by singer Kesha on the release day of her single "Praying", her first in close to four years, about her public struggles against producer Dr. Luke (detailed in Kesha v. Dr. Luke).

Lenny Letter was supported by Hearst Corporation advertising. After December 2017, it was supported by Condé Nast.

In addition to the regular newsletter, Lenny Letter published a fiction issue and a poetry issue during fall 2015. Lenny Letter was developing a possible HBO short film series.

In July 2017, Lenny Letter announced its first Lenny book imprint with Random House, writer Jenny Zhang's short story collection, Sour Heart.

In November 2017, following Dunham and Konner's controversial letter denouncing Aurora Perrineau's accusation of sexual assault by Murray Miller, Zinzi Clemmons announced that she would no longer contribute to the newsletter, saying Dunham's racism was "well-known" and called for all women of color to "divest" from Dunham.

In October 2018, it was announced the website would be shutting down, reportedly due to a decline in subscribers and failure to build momentum upon other platforms. Contributors were told a week prior to the shut down, receiving fees for unpublished written works.

== Publications ==
- Zhang, Jenny (2017). Sour Heart: Stories. New York: Lenny. ISBN 978-0-399-58938-6. OCLC 962438345.
- Ngozi Adichie, Chimamanda; Ross, Tracee Ellis; Waters, Alice; Wu, Jason (2017). Haramis, Nicholas (ed.). Courage Is Contagious (Collection of essays). New York: Lenny. ISBN 978-0-399-59261-4. OCLC 971091570.

== Featured ==
- Bett Williams
- Lupe Valdez
- Jeneca Jones
- Else Bostelmann
- Mya Spalter
