= Rookie (magazine) =

American online teen magazine

- Website type: Online magazine
- Editor: Tavi Gevinson
- Website: rookiemag.com
- Commercial: Yes
- Current status: Defunct

Rookie was an American online magazine for teenagers created by fashion blogger Tavi Gevinson. Rookie published art and writing from a wide variety of contributors, including journalists, celebrities, and the magazine's readers. The subject matter ranged from pop culture and fashion to adolescent social issues and feminism. Rookie's content was divided into monthly "issues," each built around a theme. It updated five days a week, three times a day: roughly just after school, at dinnertime, and "when it's really late and you should be writing a paper but are Facebook stalking instead."

== History ==
In November 2010, Gevinson announced on her blog, Style Rookie, that she would be launching a new magazine with Jane Pratt, founding editor of Sassy. Though Sassy had ceased publication in 1996, the year Gevinson was born, the fashion blogger had on several previous occasions expressed her admiration for the defunct indie teen magazine and lamented the fact that her generation did not have a Sassy heir to call its own.

Negotiations began between Pratt, Gevinson, and Say Media, the internet publisher behind Pratt's women's lifestyle site xoJane. This American Life host Ira Glass acted as a consultant to Gevinson and her manager and father, Steve, during the negotiations. Eventually, Pratt withdrew from official involvement in the venture, enabling Gevinson to maintain ownership. Pratt remains credited on the Rookie contributors' page as the magazine's "fairy godmother."

Rookie launched in September 2011, with Gevinson serving as editor-in-chief, former New York Times Magazine fact-checker Anaheed Alani serving as editorial director and story editor, and Lauren Redding serving as the managing editor. The magazine was published monthly with themed editorial issues and content ranging from photo journals, collages, Q&As, beauty tutorials, comics, and articles. Gevinson curated the issues from reader submissions, with the intention of nurturing young writers; the writing style of Rookie contributions was typically conversational and creative. Photographer Petra Collins was an early contributor to the magazine and heavily influenced the aesthetic appearance of it after being inspired by fashion designer Meadham Kirchoff. Arabelle Sicardi was another early regular contributor to the publication, and went on to write for Teen Vogue, Jezebel, and ELLE. Rookie published four anthologies, described as yearbooks, which consisted of compilations of online submissions as well as featured pieces from celebrities such as Donna Tartt, Ariana Grande, Solange. Rookie Yearbook One was released in 2012, and was accompanied by a cross-country tour by Gevinson, who hosted zine-making events, banner-making parties, and pinball tournaments. The magazine hosted additional meet-ups, such as Rookie Prom and the Rookie Road Trip, for fans and staff, as they had no official office space.

On November 30, 2018, it was announced that Rookie would be closing. Due to the changing media landscape, Rookie would have had to find new sources of funding, which, after exploring the possibilities available at the time, did not fit with its founder and editor's approach. Tavi Gevinson announced that, after a seven-year run, the website would regrettably shut down and cease publication immediately. As of July 2024, an archive of the issues remains online at the website.

== Reception ==
Rookie has received much attention from the blogosphere and traditional news outlets. Kara Jesella, former Teen Vogue editor and co-author of How Sassy Changed My Life: A Love Letter to the Greatest Teen Magazine of All Time, praised Rookie for its "easy" and "unapologetic" marriage of fashion and feminism. Eva Wiseman of The Observer described Gevinson as "one of the sanest, most articulate voices in the media today" and wrote, "The world worries for teenage girls today. All the porny influences, the sexting, the surgery – all the saturated pink. But counteracting these pressures to conform are the voices like those on Rookie, ones that are non-prescriptive, enthusiastic, embarrassing, funny. Ones that, by unpicking the awkwardness of female adolescence and providing a place to talk about it, have helped feminism become almost fashionable." A number of Rookie's features—such as "Ask a Grown Man/Ask a Grown Woman," in which adult celebrities answer questions submitted by teen readers—also received popular attention.
