= Julia Keller =

American writer

- Born: Huntington, West Virginia, U.S.
- Education: Marshall University; Ohio State University
- Occupations: Writer; journalist
- Writing career
- Notable awards: Pulitzer Prize for Feature Writing (2005); Barry Award (2013)
- Website: www.juliakeller.net

Julia Keller is an American writer and former journalist. Her awards include the Pulitzer Prize for Feature Writing.

== Life ==
Keller was born in Huntington, West Virginia and lived there throughout her early life. Her father was a mathematics professor who taught at Marshall University. She graduated from Marshall University in Huntington, West Virginia, and earned a doctoral degree in English literature from Ohio State University. Her master's thesis was an analysis of the Henry Roth novel, Call It Sleep. Her doctoral dissertation explored multiple biographies of Virginia Woolf (A poetics of literary biography: The creation of "Virginia Woolf", Ohio State, 1996). She currently lives in both Chicago and rural Ohio.

== Career ==
Keller was a Nieman Fellow at Harvard University from the period of 1998 to 1999. She has taught at Princeton University, the University of Notre Dame, and the University of Chicago. She also has served four times as a juror for the Pulitzer Prizes. Her reviews and commentary air on National Public Radio and on The Newshour (PBS).

Keller began her career as a journalist as an intern for columnist Jack Anderson. She went on to work for over 25 years as a reporter for many major newspapers, including The Columbus Dispatch, The Daily Independent, and the Chicago Tribune. She joined the staff of the Chicago Tribune in late 1998. She was formerly employed as a cultural critic for the Chicago Tribune, but left her job in 2012 to write full-time.

Keller won the annual Pulitzer Prize for Feature Writing for her three-part narrative account of the deadly Utica, Illinois tornado outbreak, published by the Chicago Tribune in April 2004. The jury called it a "gripping, meticulously reconstructed account of a deadly 10-second tornado". The Tribune has won many Pulitzers but Keller's prize was its first win for feature writing.

In 2008, Keller wrote a nonfiction book that detailed the cultural impact of the Gatling gun. In 2012, she started publishing a series of mysteries, The Bell Elkins Mysteries, that details a woman's return to Appalachia and the mysteries that abound in her home town. The first book in the series. starred reviews from Publishers Weekly, Library Journal, Kirkus, and Booklist. It was also a winner of the Barry Award for Best First Mystery.

== Books ==
External videos
- Presentation by Keller about Mr. Gatling's Terrible Marvel at the Printers Row Book Fair, June 8, 2008, C-SPAN

- Mr. Gatling's Terrible Marvel: The Gun That Changed Everything and the Misunderstood Genius Who Invented It (Viking, 2008)
- Back Home (Egmont, 2009), named by Booklist as one of the top ten YA debut novels of the year

=== Bell Elkins mysteries ===
1. A Killing in the Hills (Minotaur, 2012); ISBN 978-1250028754
2. Bitter River (Minotaur, 2013) ISBN 978-1250076212
3. Summer of the Dead (Minotaur, 2014) ISBN 978-1250044730
4. Last Ragged Breath (Minotaur, 2015) ISBN 978-1250044761
5. Sorrow Road (Minotaur, 2016) ISBN 978-1250089588
6. Fast Falls the Night (Minotaur, 2017) ISBN 9781250089618
7. Bone on Bone (Minotaur, 2018) ISBN 978-1250190925
8. The Cold Way Home (Minotaur, 2019) ISBN 978-1250191229

==== Bell Elkins e-novellas ====
- The Devil's Stepdaughter (Minotaur, 2014)
- A Haunting of the Bones (Minotaur, 2014)
- Ghost Roll (Minotaur, 2015)
- Evening Street (Minotaur, 2015)

=== The Dark Intercept ===
1. The Dark Intercept (Tor Teen, 2017) ISBN 9780765387622
2. Dark Mind Rising (Tor Teen, 2018) ISBN 9780765387653
3. Dark Star Calling (Tor Teen, 2019) ISBN 9780765387691
