= Waltz in Marathon =

1983 novel by Charles Dickinson

- Author: Charles Dickinson
- Language: English
- Genre: Literary fiction
- Publisher: Alfred A. Knopf
- Publication date: September 12, 1983
- Publication place: United States
- Media type: Print (Hardcover)
- Pages: 276
- ISBN: 039453199X
- Followed by: Crows

Waltz in Marathon is a 1983 debut novel by American writer Charles Dickinson, published by Alfred A. Knopf. It tells the story of Harry Waltz, a loan shark in the small town of Marathon, Michigan, whose orderly life is upended by his grown children's troubles and an unexpected romance. The novel won the Great Lakes Colleges Association New Writers Award in 1984.

== Plot summary ==
Gentleman loan shark Harry Waltz, a sixty-one-year-old resident of Marathon, Michigan, finds his life dramatically altered by the return of his grown children and his romance with Mary Hale, a successful, forty-year-old lawyer. Waltz, a widower and the wealthiest man in Marathon, has four grown children: a son who died in Vietnam, a second son, Eugene, a criminal in nearby Flint who is eventually imprisoned for robbery, and twin daughters. With Hale's help, Waltz also fends off a rival Flint loan shark.

== Reception ==
Waltz in Marathon received largely positive reviews. Kirkus Reviews called it a "sure-footed and quite impressive first novel" and "uncommonly satisfying fiction", and Christopher Lehmann-Haupt of The New York Times judged it "a fine first novel". Ruth Doan MacDougall of The Christian Science Monitor wrote that "This is a startling first novel, mature and professional, abounding with good spirits." In The New York Times Book Review, Julian Moynahan was less convinced, finding the mythic aura around the novel's hero "contrived, inauthentic and exaggerated".

In Newsday, Lucas Carpenter called the book "a thoroughly absorbing story told with grace, wit and feeling", writing that Dickinson's "contemporary Shylock rivals the original in personal depth and complexity" and that the novel "reveals a writer thoroughly in command of his art". Timothy A. Hunter of The Plain Dealer described it as "a quietly charming little gem" whose "sweetness is never cloying, its warmth never sentimental, its eccentricity never overwrought", and credited Dickinson with "remarkable control and subtlety". Catherine Bush, reviewing the novel for The Kansas City Star, found it "carefully detailed while humming quietly with suggestive power" and "the work of an attentive, generous writer".

Writing in the Detroit Free Press, Jim Finkelstein praised the novel's depiction of Michigan's recession-era "ravaged jobscape of stilled smokestacks and foreclosed families" as "achingly real", but criticized the unevenness of its opening chapters and concluded that the book "could have been so much better", while still finding "a payoff for the reader in this sensitive tale of a man and a time and a place locked in struggle". Reviewing the paperback edition for the St. Louis Post-Dispatch, Jeremy C. Shea wrote that Dickinson's "acute sense of the absurd" at times overwhelmed the plot, but that he "manages to assemble an intriguing story amidst the asides".

In the Chicago Tribune, Bruce Allen called it "an appealing and entertaining first novel on an unlikely subject" and wrote that Dickinson "capably charts his hero's bemused passage through this sea of troubles", finding the dialogue "crisply believable" and the working-class setting "made credible through dozens of finely chosen small-town details". Allen judged the book overplotted, however, and concluded that for all its "local color, vigor and authentic inventiveness" it rested on "a fantasized view of the relationship between human character and destiny" and became "finally, unconvincing". The novel reached number six on the Tribune's Chicago fiction bestseller list in November 1983. The novel won the Great Lakes Colleges Association New Writers Award in 1984.

== Film rights ==
In December 1983, Kirk Douglas purchased the film rights to the novel. A syndicated column item the following month reported that Douglas had bought a two-year option to film the book. By the following August, his production company, The Bryna Company, held the rights, with Douglas interested in playing the lead role of Harry Waltz.
