= Cheerleader (disambiguation) =

A cheerleader is a person who does cheerleading.

Cheerleader(s) may also refer to:

== Film and television ==
- "Cheerleader" (2002), an episode of the TV show 8 Simple Rules
- The Cheerleaders (1973), American comedic film
- The Cheerleaders (GLOW wrestlers), former GLOW wrestlers stable

== Books ==
- Cheerleader (2005–2007), a book trilogy by Kate Brian
- Cheerleaders (1992–1998), a series of Fear Street books by R. L. Stine
- The Cheerleader (1991), a book by Caroline B. Cooney
- The Cheerleader (1974), a book by Ruth Doan MacDougall
- The Cheerleader (1985), a book by Norma Klein

== Music ==
- Cheerleader (band), an indie pop band from Philadelphia, PA.
- "Cheerleader" (Omi song), 2012
- "Cheerleader" (Porter Robinson song), 2024
- "Cheerleader", a 2009 song by Grizzly Bear from their album Veckatimest
- "Cheerleader", a 2011 song by St. Vincent from her album Strange Mercy
- "Cheerleader", a 2023 song by Ashnikko from her album Weedkiller

== Other uses ==
- Cheerleader effect, a cognitive bias which causes people to perceive individuals as more attractive in a group than when seen alone
