= Charles Dickinson (author) =

American novelist and short story writer (born 1951)

- Born: June 4, 1951 (age 75); Detroit, Michigan, U.S.
- Education: University of Kentucky (BA, 1973)
- Occupations: Novelist; short story writer; journalist
- Spouse: Donna Dickinson
- Children: 2
- Writing career
- Genre: Literary fiction
- Notable works: Waltz in Marathon; Crows; The Widows' Adventures
- Website: charlesdickinson.com

Charles Dickinson (born June 4, 1951) is an American novelist and short story writer. A longtime Chicago newspaper journalist, he published six novels and a story collection between 1983 and 2012, and his short fiction appeared in The New Yorker, The Atlantic Monthly, and Esquire, with two stories chosen for the O. Henry Award annual collections. His debut novel, Waltz in Marathon (1983), won the Great Lakes Colleges Association New Writers Award, and Crows (1985) took the top prize of the Friends of American Writers.

Critics have characterized Dickinson's fiction as literary realism shaded with absurdity, usually set among ordinary lives in the Midwestern United States. Reviewing his story collection With or Without (1987), Michiko Kakutani found in him "something of Sherwood Anderson's sympathy for the confused denizens of small-town America", and the Times Literary Supplement called him "one of the finest… of regional American writers".

== Early life and education ==
Dickinson was born in Detroit on June 4, 1951, the son of Thomas Dickinson, a salesman, and Barbara Forrester Dickinson, an ambulance driver. He grew up in Illinois, Wisconsin, and Indiana, settling in Arlington Heights, Illinois, where he graduated from Arlington High School and got his start in journalism as a prep-sports writer for the Daily Herald. He earned a bachelor's degree in journalism from the University of Kentucky in 1973.

== Career ==
=== Journalism ===
Dickinson spent his working life on the news desks of Chicago newspapers. He was a copyeditor at the Chicago Sun-Times from 1983 to 1989, then left amid labor disputes in the late summer of 1989 to join the Chicago Tribune as an assistant metropolitan editor. Alongside his fiction he contributed essays and reviews to The New York Times Book Review, the Sun-Times, and The Detroit News, and published personal essays in The New York Times in the late 1980s.

=== Early fiction and Waltz in Marathon ===
Dickinson later said he had decided in 1976 to begin writing for himself, keeping his newspaper job to earn a living. Dickinson's short stories began appearing in national magazines in the early 1980s: "My Livelihood" in Esquire (1982), "Bill Boston" in The New Yorker (1982), and "Risk" in The Atlantic Monthly (January 1983). "Risk" was selected by William Abrahams for Prize Stories 1984: The O. Henry Awards. "Bill Boston" was later adapted for the public-radio series Selected Shorts, which broadcast it in December 2000 and again in 2002, in a reading by Alec Baldwin. In 1982 he received an Illinois Arts Council artist's grant.

His debut novel, Waltz in Marathon (Alfred A. Knopf, 1983), concerns Harry Waltz, a 61-year-old loan shark in the small town of Marathon, Michigan, whose orderly late life is upended by his children's troubles and by romance with a younger lawyer. Christopher Lehmann-Haupt of The New York Times judged it "a fine first novel", and Kirkus Reviews called it "uncommonly satisfying fiction", though Julian Moynahan, in The New York Times Book Review, found the mythic aura around its hero "contrived, inauthentic and exaggerated". The Christian Science Monitor described it as "startling… mature and professional, abounding with good spirits". The novel won the Great Lakes Colleges Association New Writers Award in 1984. In December 1983, Kirk Douglas purchased the film rights to the novel for his production company, The Bryna Company, and was interested in playing Harry Waltz himself.

=== Crows and With or Without ===
Crows (Knopf, 1985) is set in the college town of Mozart, Wisconsin, where an unemployed young sportswriter, Robert Cigar, becomes caretaker to the family of his drowned mentor, a biology professor whose anthropomorphic crow fables thread the novel. Lehmann-Haupt called it "charming and touching, an impressive advance from his promising first novel", and in the Times Literary Supplement Fernanda Eberstadt judged Dickinson "one of the finest… of regional American writers". The novel received the Friends of American Writers' top prize in 1986.

The collection With or Without and Other Stories (Knopf, 1987) gathered ten stories of working-class Midwestern life, several first published in The New Yorker. Kakutani wrote that the best stories anchor their symbolism in "personal and domestic details", comparing Dickinson to Sherwood Anderson, while Jonathan Yardley of The Washington Post called the book "smart, knowing, perceptive" and observed that Dickinson "seems to like and respect the characters he creates". Publishers Weekly wrote that the collection "reaffirms his stature as an original writer". A second story, "Child in the Leaves" (The New Yorker, 1988), was chosen for Prize Stories 1989: The O. Henry Awards.

=== The Widows' Adventures and Rumor Has It ===
The Widows' Adventures (Morrow, 1989) follows two recently widowed Chicago sisters who drive to Los Angeles by night – the blind sister at the wheel, guided by her beer-drinking sibling. Hilma Wolitzer, in The New York Times Book Review, praised the novel's "quirky freshness" and called Dickinson "a writer of uncommon interest", and Barbara Kingsolver, in the Los Angeles Times, described it as a novel "written by an author who loves his characters beyond measure". Kirkus Reviews dissented, judging that the material "seems no more than a long story". In 2008 the novel was optioned for film, with Diane Keaton attached to star; the project was not produced.

Rumor Has It (Morrow, 1991) drew directly on Dickinson's newspaper years. Set on a single Halloween day, the novel follows news editor Danny Fain of the tabloid Chicago Bugle, who chases what he believes was a hit-and-run glimpsed from his commuter train, while learning that his paper is folding. Publishers Weekly found the novel "more topical, comical and widely accessible than Dickinson's earlier work", and in Editor & Publisher Hiley Ward observed that "a central ethical question" develops into "the core of the book". In Chicago the novel was read as a roman à clef of the Sun-Times: the Chicago Reader reported that staffers scanned advance galleys for their own likenesses, and Dickinson said of his former colleagues, "I wrote it almost as a tribute to them".

=== A Shortcut in Time and A Family in Time ===
Dickinson completed three novels in the twelve years after Rumor Has It but published none of them – two, he later said, that "no one wanted" and a third "that I pulled myself after finishing it". He returned with the time travel novel A Shortcut in Time (Forge, 2003), in which Josh Winkler, an artist in the fictional town of Euclid Heights, Illinois, is thrown fifteen minutes into the past while running down a familiar neighborhood shortcut – and soon contends with a teenage girl who arrives insisting the year is 1908. Publishers Weekly judged it "a low-key gem" reminiscent of Jack Finney's Time and Again, calling Dickinson "a splendid writer who has yet to reach the audience he deserves", while Kirkus Reviews saw "a genial little piece of time-travel trickery". In Booklist, Whitney Scott wrote that Dickinson "conjures a notably mundane environment, then makes it extraordinary". The Encyclopedia of Science Fiction classifies it as a timeslip tale whose entanglement of characters across eras recalls Ray Bradbury, Finney, and Ken Grimwood.

Dickinson continued the story in A Family in Time (2012), a sequel published exclusively as a self-published e-book. In December 2002, USATODAY.com had serialized his holiday tale Night of Nights in seven weekly installments as part of its Open Book series. Beginning in the mid-2010s, HarperCollins reissued his out-of-print backlist in e-book editions.

== Themes and style ==
Dickinson's fiction typically applies close realism to small Midwestern communities – often invented towns such as Marathon, Michigan; Mozart, Wisconsin; and Euclid Heights, Illinois – and admits elements of fable and the fantastic, from the crow stories embedded in Crows to the time travel of his last two novels. Kakutani observed that across his early books Dickinson "demonstrated a decided taste for parables". Yardley located the center of his work in ordinary, unglamorous lives, writing that in Dickinson's fiction "relatively little actually takes place but significant emotional journeys are often made". A 1987 Gannett News Service profile called him "a writer's writer" whose critical acclaim had not yet translated into fame or commercial success. Dickinson wrote his first two novels with Dixon Ticonderoga pencils, telling a Daily Herald columnist it was "satisfying to sharpen pencils because you're making progress if the pencil's getting smaller".

== Awards and honors ==
- Illinois Arts Council grant (1982)
- Great Lakes Colleges Association New Writers Award, for Waltz in Marathon (1984)
- O. Henry Award: "Risk" included in Prize Stories 1984, and "Child in the Leaves" in Prize Stories 1989
- Friends of American Writers top prize, for Crows (1986)

== Personal life ==
Dickinson married Donna Gawron, a figure-skating instructor, on September 6, 1978; they have two children and settled in Palatine, Illinois. He later returned to Arlington Heights.

== Bibliography ==
=== Novels ===
- Waltz in Marathon (Knopf, 1983)
- Crows (Knopf, 1985)
- The Widows' Adventures (Morrow, 1989)
- Rumor Has It (Morrow, 1991)
- A Shortcut in Time (Forge, 2003)
- A Family in Time (self-published e-book, 2012)

=== Story collection ===
- With or Without and Other Stories (Knopf, 1987)

=== Serialized fiction ===
- Night of Nights (USATODAY.com Open Book series, 2002)

=== Selected short stories ===
- "My Livelihood" (Esquire, May 1982)
- "Bill Boston" (The New Yorker, November 8, 1982)
- "Risk" (The Atlantic Monthly, January 1983; reprinted in Prize Stories 1984: The O. Henry Awards)
- "Arcadia" (Grand Street, Summer 1983)
- "Sofa Art" (The New Yorker, May 6, 1985)
- "A Night in the Garden" (The New Yorker, February 17, 1986)
- "Abundance" (The New Yorker, November 9, 1987)
- "Child in the Leaves" (The New Yorker, March 7, 1988; reprinted in Prize Stories 1989: The O. Henry Awards)
- "1-800-Your Boy" (The Atlantic Monthly, March 1988)
- "Colonel Roebling's Friend" (The Atlantic Monthly, September 1995)
