= Mizna (disambiguation) =

Mizna is a nonprofit arts organization in St. Paul, Minnesota, United States.

Mizna may also refer to:

== People ==
- Mizna Shareef, Maldivian diplomat and politician
- Mizna Waqas, Pakistani television and theatre actress

== Other ==
- Mizna (journal), a biannual American literary magazine
