= Stardust (magazine) =

Indian film and lifestyle magazine

- Aishwarya Rai Bachchan on the May 2016 cover of Stardust
- Editor: Sumita Chakraborty
- Former editors: Shobhaa De
- Categories: Film and Lifestyle magazine
- Frequency: Monthly
- Circulation: 288000
- Publisher: Nari Hira
- First issue: 1971
- Company: Magna Publishing Co. Ltd.
- Country: India
- Based in: Mumbai
- Language: English, Hindi
- Website: stardustmagz.com

Stardust is an Indian monthly Bollywood news and gossip magazine published in English and Hindi. It also sponsored the Stardust Awards. In 2016, Sumita Chakraborty was appointed as its editor.

== History ==
The magazine is published by Mumbai-based Magna Publishing Co. Ltd. and was started by Nari Hira in 1971. It became popular under the editorship of noted journalist, author and columnist, Shobhaa De after 1995. The magazine has run a gossip column called "Neeta's Natter" for many decades now. Amitabh Bachchan refused to be interviewed by the magazine for seven years. Many defamation lawsuits were filed against the magazine, most of which made no progress due to the "ambiguous defamation laws" of the country. The magazine was known for introducing Hinglish and for the covers that used headlines covering the scandals, coupled with pictures of the concerned celebrities.

== See also ==
- Filmfare
- Filmindia
- Cine Blitz
