= One Story =

American literary magazine

- Issue #150 cover "Tiger" by Nalini Jones
- Editor: Patrick Ryan
- Categories: Literature
- Frequency: 12 per year
- Publisher: Maribeth Batcha
- First issue: April 2002
- Company: One Story, Inc.
- Country: United States
- Based in: Brooklyn, New York
- Language: English
- Website: one-story.com
- ISSN: 1544-7340

One Story is an American non-profit literary magazine publishing established, early-career, and emerging writers. It publishes 12 issues a year, each issue containing a single three- to eight thousand-word short story. The magazine was founded in 2002 by writers Hannah Tinti and Maribeth Batcha. It is headquartered in the Old American Can Factory, in the Gowanus neighborhood in Brooklyn, NY. Despite having no backing from any university, One Story is one of the largest circulating literary magazines in the country, with a readership of over 15,000 as of 2021.

The magazine is published in a five-by-seven-inch, saddle-stitched format, with a single-color cover, resembling a pamphlet.

One Teen Story, a companion magazine written by and for teens, launched in 2012. Currently published three times per year, the magazine explores themes and situations compelling to younger readers. One Teen Story sponsors a free writing contest for teens age 13-19.

Notable authors published in One Story include Lauren Acampora, Weike Wang, Achy Obejas, Dave Eggers, Isaac Bashevis Singer, Tom Hanks, Ann Patchett, Joyce Carol Oates, and Aimee Bender.

== History ==
One Story was founded with an initial investment of $3,000 from Maribeth Batcha.

For the inaugural issue, Batcha and Tinti asked mutual friend John Hodgman to submit a story. Hodgman agreed, and in April 2002, his "wry, genre-bending story," “Villanova or: How I Became a Former Professional Literary Agent,” was published under a gray cover as One Story’s first issue. The first issue had a print run of 600 and cost about $1,000.

== Awards ==
One Story has received a 2024 DAG Foundation Grant, a 2020 Whiting Award, a 2018 Firecracker Award, and a 2014 AWP Small Press Publisher Award. Editor Hannah Tinti won a 2009 PEN/Nora Magid Award. Stories originally published in the magazine have been awarded the O. Henry and Pushcart Prizes and have been reprinted in Best American Short Stories and Best American Non-Required Reading.
