= Crows (novel) =

1985 novel by Charles Dickinson

- Paperback edition cover
- Author: Charles Dickinson
- Language: English
- Publisher: Alfred A. Knopf
- Publication date: 1985
- Publication place: United States
- Media type: Print
- Pages: 335
- ISBN: 0394542975
- Preceded by: Waltz in Marathon
- Followed by: With or Without and Other Stories

Crows is a 1985 novel by American writer Charles Dickinson, published by Alfred A. Knopf. Dickinson's second novel, it is set in the college town of Mozart, Wisconsin. It received the Friends of American Writers top prize in 1986.

== Plot ==
The novel follows Robert Cigar, an unemployed young sportswriter who becomes caretaker to the family of his drowned mentor, a biology professor whose anthropomorphic crow fables are threaded through the novel, as the family absorbs the loss and Robert resists moving on with his own life.

== Reception ==
Christopher Lehmann-Haupt of The New York Times called the novel "charming and touching, an impressive advance from his promising first novel", adding "There are no clichés in Crows". In The Kansas City Star, Victor C. Thomas gave a more mixed verdict: Dickinson "has demonstrated a remarkable and prodigious imagination" and "the crow tales alone are worth the price of admission", but the reader is left wishing he "had spent less time with Robert Cigar and more with Ben Ladysmith and his crow tales". In the Times Literary Supplement, Fernanda Eberstadt described Dickinson as "one of the finest... of regional American writers" and called Crows an "immensely persuasive novel, compelling in its human sympathy". Alida Becker of The Detroit News wrote that Dickinson "has managed to take the warmth and wisdom that made his first book so special and give them even more strength and shading". A Gannett News Service review was less favourable, calling the book "tepid" and "unoriginal" and arguing that it borrowed the preoccupations of John Irving's early novels — "mutilation, skewed sexuality, perpetual adolescence, bizarre families and a fascination with sports" — without "the quirky inventiveness or charming humor" that animated them; it judged the crow fables "as uniformly bland as the rest of the book". The novel was reissued as an e-book by HarperCollins.
