= The Widows' Adventures =

1989 novel by Charles Dickinson

- Author: Charles Dickinson
- Language: English
- Genre: Literary fiction
- Publisher: William Morrow
- Publication date: August 1, 1989
- Publication place: United States
- Media type: Print (Hardcover)
- Pages: 381
- ISBN: 0688089240
- Preceded by: With or Without and Other Stories
- Followed by: Rumor Has It

The Widows' Adventures is a 1989 novel by American writer Charles Dickinson, about two widowed sisters who drive from Chicago to Los Angeles by night – the blind sister at the wheel, directed by her beer-drinking sibling.

== Plot summary ==
Ina and Helene, recently widowed sisters from Chicago, drive to Los Angeles to visit their grown children. Helene, who is blind and diabetic, is the only one of the two who can drive; she operates the car while Ina, drinking beer in the passenger seat, acts as her eyes. To avoid traffic they travel on back roads at night.

== Reception ==
The Widows' Adventures received largely positive reviews. Barbara Kingsolver of the Los Angeles Times stated “That most wonderful and increasingly rare sort of novel written by an author who loves his characters beyond measure.” Hilma Wolitzer of The New York Times wrote that the novel had "quirky freshness", and calling Dickinson "a writer of uncommon interest." Library Journal praised Dickinson's writing by saying "The characterization develops fully just soon enough to hook the reader, who may find this novel a refreshing change, as it examines the physical, emotional, and spiritual lives of two endearing but not perfect older women.” Rob Walker, reviewing it in the San Antonio Express-News, wrote that Dickinson "makes his best case yet" against the adage that truth is stranger than fiction, pointing to "the Illinois writer's knack for peculiar characterization". Reviewing the Avon paperback in the Edmonton Journal, books editor Lynne Van Luven called the novel "a delightful read and a wonderfully empowering look at old age" and "a much more sensitive, urbane and wryly tender portrayal" than the road films it superficially resembles. The novel was the cover review of the Chicago Tribune's Books section, where the novelist Melissa Pritchard wrote that Dickinson had brought "adroit skill, quiet, compressed hilarity and compassionate philosophy" to the premise. Pritchard said that a reader initially thinks the story "not possible, incredible, cute", but that "before long" one is "cheering Ina and Helene to a finish that is no finish at all but a fresh and brave beginning, our stereotypes poked full of holes". She called it "a novel built wisely, carefully", if at times "over-smooth", and judged the book's only flaw to be Dickinson's "tendency to be planted a little too firmly in the backseat". Benedict Cosgrove, reviewing the book for the San Francisco Chronicle, wrote that Dickinson had taken "the formula of the American road novel" and given it "a unique twist", and that his prose was "clear, strong and, above all, controlled". Cosgrove judged the story "far from seeming forced or farfetched", gathering power "from the mastery with which Dickinson portrays their daring and frailty", and "so engaging, assured and devoid of sentimentality that the endeavor is imbued with its own inexorable logic". In the Detroit Free Press, columnist Linnea Lannon recommended the novel, writing that its plot "is implausible, but somehow Dickinson pulls it off" and that the book was "so charming" that she intended to read his earlier work. Kirkus Reviews dissented: while comparing Dickinson's portrayal of the sisters to "classic Wright Morris", it concluded that the material "seems no more than a long story" and that "once on the road, the novelty thins".

== Film adaptation ==
A January 2003 review in The Star-Ledger reported that the novel had recently been optioned by TriStar Pictures as a vehicle for Angela Lansbury and Shirley MacLaine. In April 2008, Variety reported that Diane Keaton would star in a film adaptation of the novel, a road-trip comedy-drama from a spec script by Jason Pomerance, with Paul Brooks of Gold Circle Films and Sidney Sherman of Rosa Entertainment producing. At the time of the announcement, the role of the second sister had not been cast and the project was being offered to directors, with filming aimed for later that year; the film was not produced.
