= A Shortcut in Time =

2003 novel by Charles Dickinson

- First-edition cover
- Author: Charles Dickinson
- Language: English
- Genre: Time travel fiction
- Publisher: Forge Books
- Publication date: 2003
- Publication place: United States
- Media type: Print
- Pages: 288
- ISBN: 0765305798
- Preceded by: Rumor Has It
- Followed by: A Family in Time

A Shortcut in Time is a 2003 time travel novel by American writer Charles Dickinson, published by Forge Books. Dickinson continued the story in a self-published sequel, A Family in Time (2012).

== Background ==
Dickinson based the novel's premise on the concrete pathways between houses in his neighborhood in Arlington Heights, Illinois, saying he had always been intrigued by them and wondered "what would happen if you could use these pathways as a way to travel though time". He wrote the novel in about a year; it was his fourth novel written since Rumor Has It (1991), the previous three having gone unpublished.

== Publication ==
The manuscript's time-travel plot caused several publishers to pass on it, many of them unfamiliar with Dickinson's three earlier novels. His agent then showed it to editor David G. Hartwell, who had worked with one of Dickinson's editors at William Morrow in the 1980s and recognized the name. Hartwell bought the book for Tor Books but, not wanting it sold as science fiction, published it under the company's Forge imprint.

For the same reason, Tor art director Irene Gallo designed a cover that only "hinted at something fantastic": a photograph of a suburban landscape with a giant spiral cloud superimposed "to add a touch of unreality". Dickinson said the spiral reminded him of the opening of the original The Outer Limits television series, and that he had suggested "a small apple suspended in mid air, because apples play a part in the story", but he did not press the point. Hartwell said the spiral "doesn't mean anything except that it excludes all ordinary explanations".

== Plot ==
In the fictional town of Euclid Heights, Illinois, Josh Winkler takes a shortcut path and finds himself fifteen minutes in the past; a teenage girl subsequently arrives claiming to have walked out of 1908, and Josh's attempts to help her are met with disbelief that tests his family and his sanity.

== Reception ==
Publishers Weekly called it a "psychologically rich and engrossing novel" and "a low-key gem", describing Dickinson as "a splendid writer who has yet to reach the audience he deserves". Kirkus Reviews found it "a little too laid-back for its own good" but "a genial little piece of time-travel trickery". In the Chicago Tribune, where Dickinson then worked as an assistant metro editor, Loren Ghiglione observed that in contrast with the extraordinary destinations of most time-travel tales, the novel "focuses on the ordinary, which encourages readers to consider their relationships". In the San Francisco Chronicle, Michael Berry wrote that while the novel offered "no superb twist that elevates it above the many time-travel tales that have come before", its engagement was "testimony to Dickinson's skill with characterization, setting and mood", and called it "a welcome addition to a popular subgenre". Reviewing it in The Star-Ledger, Nan Goldberg described Dickinson as "an unsung American literary treasure" whose novels "are not nearly as well-known as they deserve to be", and wrote that with A Shortcut in Time he "may finally have his breakout book". In The Roanoke Times, Mark Rowh wrote that with "solid writing, engaging characters and a deft touch for portraying everyday family life", Dickinson "delivers the kind of book that sticks with the reader long after the conclusion". Jennifer Baker of Library Journal wrote that the novel "proposes fascinating questions about time, history and sanity", and Whitney Scott of Booklist found that Dickinson "conjures a notably mundane environment, then makes it extraordinary". The Encyclopedia of Science Fiction classifies it as a timeslip tale whose entanglement of characters across eras recalls Ray Bradbury, Jack Finney, and Ken Grimwood.

== Sequel ==
Dickinson returned to the story in A Family in Time, which he published himself as an e-book in 2012. The sequel again centers on Josh Winkler, who tries to put time travel behind him but cannot escape an ability he does not want.
