= Rumor Has It (novel) =

1991 novel by Charles Dickinson

- First-edition cover
- Author: Charles Dickinson
- Language: English
- Publisher: William Morrow and Company
- Publication date: 1991
- Publication place: United States
- Media type: Print
- Pages: 232
- ISBN: 0688102255
- Preceded by: The Widows' Adventures
- Followed by: A Shortcut in Time

Rumor Has It is a 1991 novel by American writer Charles Dickinson, published by William Morrow and Company. Dickinson's fourth novel draws on his career in Chicago journalism.

== Plot ==
The novel details one frantic day – Halloween – in the life of Danny Fain, associate metro editor of the Chicago Bugle, a mediocre tabloid whose management announces it will be shut down in two weeks, having lost the circulation war to its rival, the Quill. Fain believes he has witnessed, from his commuter train, a hit-and-run involving a child, and pursues the story through the paper's final chaotic day of staff defections and newsroom maneuvering.

== Reception ==
Publishers Weekly found the novel "more topical, comical and widely accessible than Dickinson's earlier work" and "immediately engaging". Hiley Ward, writing in Editor & Publisher, noted that "a central ethical question develops and becomes the core of the book". Reviewing it for the Chicago Tribune, Jon Anderson described the Bugle as "a mythical Chicago tabloid" whose building reminds people "of a tugboat, a wedge of cheese, a Roach Motel", and noted that it shares its location – "the north end of the Irv Kupcinet Bridge" – with the newspaper where Dickinson had previously worked; he found the plot "thin" but wrote that Dickinson "has a good ear for nuance". In a Knight-Ridder review, Martin F. Kohn called the novel "sort of Blow Up meets The Front Page" and found its newspaper anecdotes "fun to read", writing that they "ring with authenticity", though he judged that what the book gained in humor it lost in character development. In The Philadelphia Inquirer, David Walton compared the book to Billy Wilder's 1950s film satires, and to Ace in the Hole in particular. He wrote that Dickinson's account of a newspaper "at battle with television news, declining readerships, and its own uncertain values" was "full of sharp touches and deft gibes, a portrait of a world that would be crackpot funny if it didn't also seem so sadly true to life", and concluded that it was "a fine book, polished, sharp-witted, and excellently written, but a discomforting book, too, a book that challenges its readers instead of gratifying them". James Lawless of The Plain Dealer called it "the sarcastic, bitter tale of the last days of a newspaper gone sour, ethically and financially", written "with all of the pace but less grace than The Bonfire of the Vanities". He likened Dickinson's dialogue to the style of Raymond Chandler and wrote that the novel "captures the inner dialogue of an editor, balancing dozens of details while pressing for the hot-flash reward of an exclusive ghastly story". In Chicago the novel was read as a roman à clef of the Chicago Sun-Times: the Chicago Reader reported that staffers scanned advance galleys for their own likenesses, and Dickinson said of his former colleagues, "I wrote it almost as a tribute to them". The novel was reissued as an e-book by HarperCollins.
