= With or Without and Other Stories =

1987 short story collection by Charles Dickinson

- First-edition cover
- Author: Charles Dickinson
- Language: English
- Publisher: Alfred A. Knopf
- Publication date: 1987
- Publication place: United States
- Media type: Print
- Pages: 159
- ISBN: 0394554922
- Preceded by: Crows
- Followed by: The Widows' Adventures

With or Without and Other Stories is a 1987 short story collection by American writer Charles Dickinson, published by Alfred A. Knopf. The collection gathers ten stories of working-class Midwestern life, several first published in The New Yorker, The Atlantic Monthly, and Esquire; one of them, "Risk", had been selected for the 1984 O. Henry Award annual. The stories include the title story, "Risk", "My Livelihood", "A Night in the Garden", "Sofa Art", "Jinx", "The Fire", and "Black Bart".

== Reception ==
Michiko Kakutani of The New York Times wrote that "Mr. Dickinson possesses something of Sherwood Anderson's sympathy for the confused denizens of small-town America". Jonathan Yardley of The Washington Post called it "a smart, knowing, perceptive book that explores the ways in which dignity and self-respect can be discovered", finding "far more successes than failures". Publishers Weekly wrote that the collection "reaffirms his stature as an original writer with a talent for creating offbeat characters of uncommon depth and appeal". In the Fort Worth Star-Telegram, Ronald Reed likened the characters to "the amiable skeletons who hang in middle-class American closets", finding them "oddball and amiable, and on the whole quite likable". In The Pittsburgh Press, Doug Rice wrote that the collection "introduces a fascinating new voice to American short fiction", each story "filled with surprises" and "subtle epiphanic twists that invite a new awareness if not understanding". Roger K. Anderson of the Houston Chronicle was more enthusiastic still, calling it "this generous and remarkable collection" and "the most well-crafted, generously human, excellently plotted, and just plain satisfying collection of stories that I have ever read". He measured Dickinson's prose against Raymond Carver, Chekhov, Tobias Wolff and Anne Tyler, attributed the book's "Shakespearean or Chekhovian generosity" to "setting people against each other in ways that we care about both sides", and wrote that "not a single story disappoints". Paul Prather, writing in the Lexington Herald-Leader, called the book "a commendable and sometimes startlingly good collection" and compared Dickinson's "sparse and controlled" prose to that of Raymond Carver, with whom he shared an "uncanny ability to penetrate quickly to a character's core", though "unlike Carver, Dickinson writes with a sensitivity and compassion that often leaves a reader feeling peculiarly upbeat in the midst of what should be a woeful situation". Prather thought one or two of the stories lacked that empathy — singling out "Risk" as "the most technically proficient" but "rather soulless" — while concluding that it was "a fine, and often moving, collection of stories". Kirkus Reviews wrote that "Dickinson's quiet prose often manages to transform the little disturbances of man into the most necessary of fictions – modest tales of everyday desperation and affirmation". The collection was reissued as an e-book by HarperCollins.
