= E. J. Levy =

American writer

E.J. Levy
- Born: Ellen Levy; St. Louis Park, Minnesota, U.S.
- Occupation: Writer
- Awards: Lambda Literary Award, Colorado Book Award, GLCA New Writers Award, Pushcart Prize

Academic background
- Education: Yale University (BA); Ohio State University (MFA)

Academic work
- Institutions: Colorado College, American University, University of Missouri-Columbia, Colorado State University, Kenyon College
- Website: http://ejlevy.com/

Ellen J. Levy is an American writer, who was an Associate Professor of English at Colorado State University. Her first novel, The Cape Doctor, won a 2022 Colorado Book Award and was named an Editor's Choice by The New York Times. Her story collection, "Love, In Theory," won the 2012 Flannery O'Connor Award and the 2014 Great Lakes Colleges Association New Writers Award, and she was editor of the anthology, Tasting Life Twice: Literary Lesbian Fiction by New American Writers, which won a Lambda Literary Award.

== Early life and education ==
Levy was born in St. Louis Park, Minnesota. She earned a Bachelor of Arts degree from Yale University and a Master of Fine Arts from Ohio State University.

== Career ==
As of 2024, she retired from being an associate professor in the English department at Colorado State University, concentrating on fiction and non-fiction creative writing. She received tenure in 2014.

Her work has appeared in The Paris Review, The New York Times, and Salon. She was the editor of the anthology, Tasting Life Twice: Literary Lesbian Fiction by New American Writers, which won a Lambda Literary Award. She has won a Pushcart Prize.

Levy's debut story collection, Love, In Theory, won the 2012 Flannery O'Connor Award for Short Fiction, a 2012 Foreword Book of the Year Award (Bronze), and the 2014 Great Lakes Colleges Association's (GLCA) New Writers Award for Fiction. A Publishers Weekly review of the book called Levy "a master of his [sic] form".

=== The Cape Doctor ===
In February 2019, publisher Little, Brown and Company acquired Levy's historical novel The Cape Doctor. It is a portrayal of military surgeon James Barry (1789-1865), who was born Margaret Bulkley but lived as a man as an adult. When Levy announced the upcoming book's sale on social media, she referred to Barry as "she" and a "heroine", which was criticized by transgender people and some authors who say male pronouns are more in line with Barry's life history and self-image. Levy told The Times that Barry is most often referred to as "I" in her novel and sometimes as "she" and "he". In response to the controversy, biographer Jeremy Dronfield said, "I have no argument with seeing James Barry as a transgender icon, or Margaret as a feminist role model. I do take issue with those who insist on recognising one and erasing the other."

The book was released in June, 2021. The New York Times reviewer said that the book, following the female protagonist Perry, explores her experiences "sometimes painfully, sometimes wittily, always persuasively". Kirkus Reviews wrote "Artfully written but more likely to attract attention for its subject than its author's craft." Booklist said "in sum, an unforgettable work of art that deserves raves." The Denver Post wrote "The story is a good one, but it is the exquisite writing and the portrayal of women in the first half of the 19th century that make The Cape Doctor such an intriguing book."

The book won a 2022 Colorado Book Award for historical fiction, and a prix Libr’ à Nous in 2024.

== Personal life ==
Levy identifies as a lesbian. In a 2013 essay, she described herself as marrying a man but continuing to be a lesbian.

== Publications ==
=== Books ===
- Tasting Life Twice: Literary Lesbian Fiction by New American Writers. Avon. 1995. ISBN 978-0-3807-8123-2.
- Love, In Theory. University of Georgia Press. 2012. ISBN 978-0-8203-4349-5.
- Amazons: A Love Story. University of Missouri Press. 2012. ISBN 978-0-8262-1975-6.
- The Cape Doctor. Little, Brown and Company. 2021. ISBN 9780316536585.
