= Tarik Dobbs =

American poet and editor

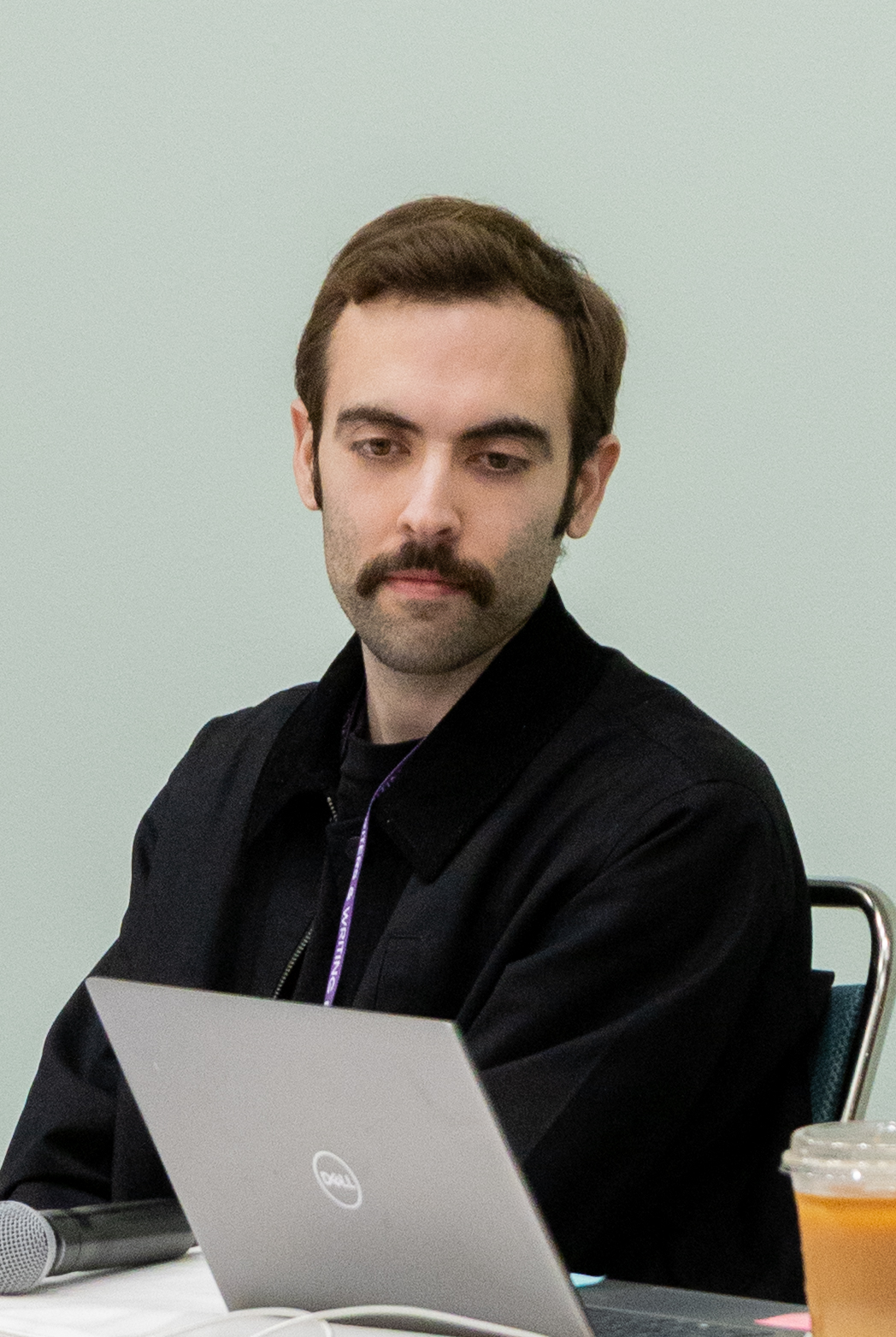
- Dobbs at the 2025 AWP Conference
- Born: 1997 (age 28–29); Dearborn, Michigan, U.S.
- Education: University of Michigan; University of Minnesota; Northwestern University
- Occupations: poet; editor
- Writing career
- Genre: Poetry
- Notable work: Nazar Boy
- Notable awards: GLCA New Writers Award; Ruth Lilly and Dorothy Sargent Rosenberg Poetry Fellowship

Tarik Dobbs (طارق دبس; born 1997) is an Arab American poet and editor. He is the author of Nazar Boy, which received the 2026 GLCA New Writers Award for Poetry. In 2022, Dobbs was named a Ruth Lilly and Dorothy Sargent Rosenberg Poetry Fellow.

== Early life and education ==
Dobbs was born in Dearborn, Michigan, and studied art at the University of Michigan, where he earned a B.A. and a B.G.S. He later received M.F.A. degrees from the University of Minnesota and Northwestern University.

== Career ==
Dobbs is an assistant professor of English in creative writing at Southwest Minnesota State University. His chapbook Dancing on the Tarmac was selected by Gabrielle Calvocoressi for Yemassee's 2020 Poetry Chapbook Prize and was published in 2021. Dobbs's first full-length collection, Nazar Boy, was published by Haymarket Books in 2024 and was taught at Wesleyan University.

Dobbs has guest edited for Mizna and is chief executive officer of Poetry Online, a literary nonprofit focused on accessibility.

Disability is a recurring subject in Dobbs's work and editorial practice. In 2022, he curated Zoeglossia's Poem of the Week series "The Personal & Political Archive", which focused on disability and archives. Dobbs's poem "Poem Where Every Bird Is a Drone" appears in Poetry Foundation's Disability Poetics collection. In a 2024 article, Faiza Mahfouf read the poem as linking genocide and ecocide.

In 2026, Dobbs was included in the Palais de Tokyo exhibition Cheryl Marie Wade, the Queen-Mother of Gnarly, a disability arts exhibit honoring activist Cheryl Marie Wade.

== Personal life ==
Dobbs is gay and has Poland syndrome.

== Works ==
=== Books ===
- Nazar Boy (Haymarket Books, 2024)
- Dearbornistan (Haymarket Books, forthcoming)

=== Chapbooks ===
- Dancing on the Tarmac (Yemassee, 2021); selected by Gabrielle Calvocoressi

=== Selected poems ===
- "Poem Where Every Bird Is a Drone" (Poetry, May 2021)
