= The Cheerleader =

1973 novel by Ruth Doan MacDougall

- Author: Ruth Doan MacDougall
- Language: English
- Publisher: Putnam
- Publication date: 1974
- Publication place: United States
- Pages: 288 pp
- ISBN: 0-9663352-0-1
- OCLC: 39368608
- Dewey Decimal: 813/.54 21
- LC Class: PS3563.A292 C48 1998

The Cheerleader is a 1973 coming of age novel by Ruth Doan MacDougall.

Described on the author's website as "searchingly honest, achingly real, [recalling] all the joy, excitement, and pain of crossing the bridge from childhood to young womanhood in the Fabulous Fifties, when sex was still a mystery and goals were clearly defined--perhaps for the last time," it was first published in 1973 by Putnam and re-released in its 4th printing in 1998 by Frigate Books.

This is the first of five books in the "Snowy Series" ("Snowy: a sequel to The Cheerleader," "Henrietta Snow," "The Husband Bench, or Bev's Book," and "A Born Maniac, or Puddles Progress") following Snowy and "The Gang" as they continue through life.
