= Mizna (journal) =

Biannual American literary magazine

- Cover of Mizna, vol. 22, no. 1
- Executive editor: Moheb Soliman
- Former editors: George Abraham
- Categories: Literary magazine
- Frequency: Biannual
- Founder: Kathryn Haddad; Saleh Abudayyeh
- First issue: 1999
- Company: Mizna
- Country: United States
- Based in: St. Paul, Minnesota
- Language: English
- Website: mizna.org/journal/
- ISSN: 1535-2331

Mizna (full title: Mizna: SWANA Literature + Art) is an American literary magazine published biannually in print and digital formats by the nonprofit arts organization Mizna in St. Paul, Minnesota. Founded in 1999, it publishes poetry, fiction, nonfiction, comics, visual poetry, and visual art centered on Arab and Southwest Asian and North African (SWANA) writers and artists. The journal was originally published with the subtitle Prose, Poetry, and Art Exploring Arab America; and in 2021, with volume 22, issue 1, it adopted the subtitle SWANA Literature + Art.

NPR described it as the first Arab American literary journal in the United States. In 2021, Mizna won the CLMP Firecracker Award for general excellence (magazines), and in 2023 it received the Whiting Literary Magazine Prize.

== History ==
The journal grew out of the arts section of a newsletter produced by volunteers with the Minnesota chapter of the American-Arab Anti-Discrimination Committee. After a national call for submissions drew a strong response, founders Kathryn Haddad and Saleh Abudayyeh Haddad developed the publication as a standalone journal, whose first issue appeared in 1999. A 2001 Minnesota Public Radio report described it as the country's only literary journal featuring writing by Arab Americans. The journal launched shortly before the September 11 attacks, after which its editors said the need for the publication became more urgent.

In 2021, with the publication of volume 22, the journal adopted the subtitle SWANA Literature + Art, replacing the original Prose, Poetry, and Art Exploring Arab America. Executive director Lana Barkawi described the term SWANA as a "decolonized" alternative to the Eurocentric framing of "Middle East".

== Editorial profile ==
Mizna publishes poetry, fiction, essays, comics, visual poetry, and visual art in a biannual print and digital format. The journal's executive editor is Moheb Soliman, who in late 2024 succeeded George Abraham.

Contributors have included Naomi Shihab Nye, Suheir Hammad, Mahmoud Darwish, Laila Lalami, Eileen Myles, Hala Alyan, Natalie Diaz, Joe Sacco, Mohja Kahf, Kazim Ali, and Mohammed el-Kurd.

In addition to its print journal, Mizna also publishes Mizna Online. In a 2024 interview with Mn Artists, executive director Lana Barkawi said Mizna launched the platform to publish on a faster timeline than the print journal allows, including work by Gazan, Sudanese, and Armenian writers.

== Selected issues ==
Many issues of Mizna have been organized around themes or guest editorial concepts. The journal's archive includes issues devoted to topics such as revolution, intersectionality, Palestine, queer and trans writing, comics, formal experimentation, Etel Adnan, Black SWANA writing, myth and memory, cinema, and futurity.

Selected issues of Mizna
Volume	Issue	Date	Theme / title	Notes
6	1	Summer 2004	—	Issue published with the note "In Memory of Edward W. Said (1935–2003)".
8	2	Winter 2006	The Lebanon Issue	Themed issue about Lebanon.
11	1	2009	Mahmoud Darwish Memorial	Memorial issue about Mahmoud Darwish.
13	1	Summer 2012	Literature in Revolution	Guest edited by Mohammed A. Bamyeh.
17	2	Winter 2016	The Environment Issue	Guest edited by Gary Paul Nabhan. The Arab American News covered the issue's intersection of environmentalism with Arab American experience.
18	1	Summer 2017	Surviving	Guest edited by Moustafa Bayoumi. The Arab American News reported that Mizna's summer 2017 issue would explore the theme of “Surviving”, and a University of Notre Dame speaker biography describes Bayoumi as guest editor of a special edition of Mizna titled Surviving.
19	2	Winter 2018	The Palestine Issue	Guest edited by Ismail Khalidi.
20	1	Summer 2019	Twenty Years	20th-anniversary issue, covered by NPR.
21	1	Summer 2020	Queer + Trans Voices	Guest edited by Zeyn Joukhadar. Catapult author notes and The Queer Arabs podcast both identify Joukhadar as guest editor of Mizna's 2020 Queer + Trans Voices issue.
21	2	Winter 2020	The Comix Issue	Guest edited by Leila Abdelrazaq.
22	1	Summer 2021	—	Issue marking the journal's adoption of the subtitle SWANA Literature + Art.
22	2	Winter 2021	The Experimental Issue	Guest edited by Tarik Dobbs.
23	1	Summer 2022	Tribute to Etel Adnan	Tribute issue for Etel Adnan. Flash Art reported that Mizna's summer 2022 issue included a tribute to Adnan and would feature her paintings and tapestries.
23	2	Winter 2022	The Black SWANA Issue	Guest edited by Safia Elhillo. KARE 11 covered the issue's exploration of Black SWANA identity, and Minnesota's Legacy Fund described it as a special “Black Takeover” issue produced by an all-Black team.
24	2	2023	The Cinema Issue	Guest edited by Saeed Taji Farouky.
25	2	2024	Futurities	Guest edited by Barrak Alzaid and Aram Kavoossi. MIT ACT promoted the Mizna Futurities issue launch symposium in 2025, describing the issue as an invitation to speculate on “relationalities of people, land, futurity, and catastrophe in the twenty-first century”.

== Awards and recognition ==
In 2021, Mizna won the CLMP Firecracker Award for magazines/general excellence, given annually by the Community of Literary Magazines and Presses for independently published literature. The judges described it as a publication that combined international reach with regional rootedness and called it "a magazine that is deeply alive".

In September 2023, Mizna was one of seven recipients of the Whiting Literary Magazine Prize, which was reported by Publishers Weekly, NPR, and Literary Hub. The prize included $20,000 in grants in 2023, with matching grants of up to the same amount in 2024 and 2025. Other recipients in the same cycle included The Paris Review, n+1, Guernica, the Los Angeles Review of Books, Orion, and the Oxford American. The Whiting Foundation judges described the journal as "tightly edited, gorgeously curated, and visually striking". The St. Paul Pioneer Press covered the award, noting the journal would receive $60,000 over three years.

== See also ==
- Asian American Literary Review
