= Yahya Ashour =

Palestinian poet and writer

- يحيى عاشور
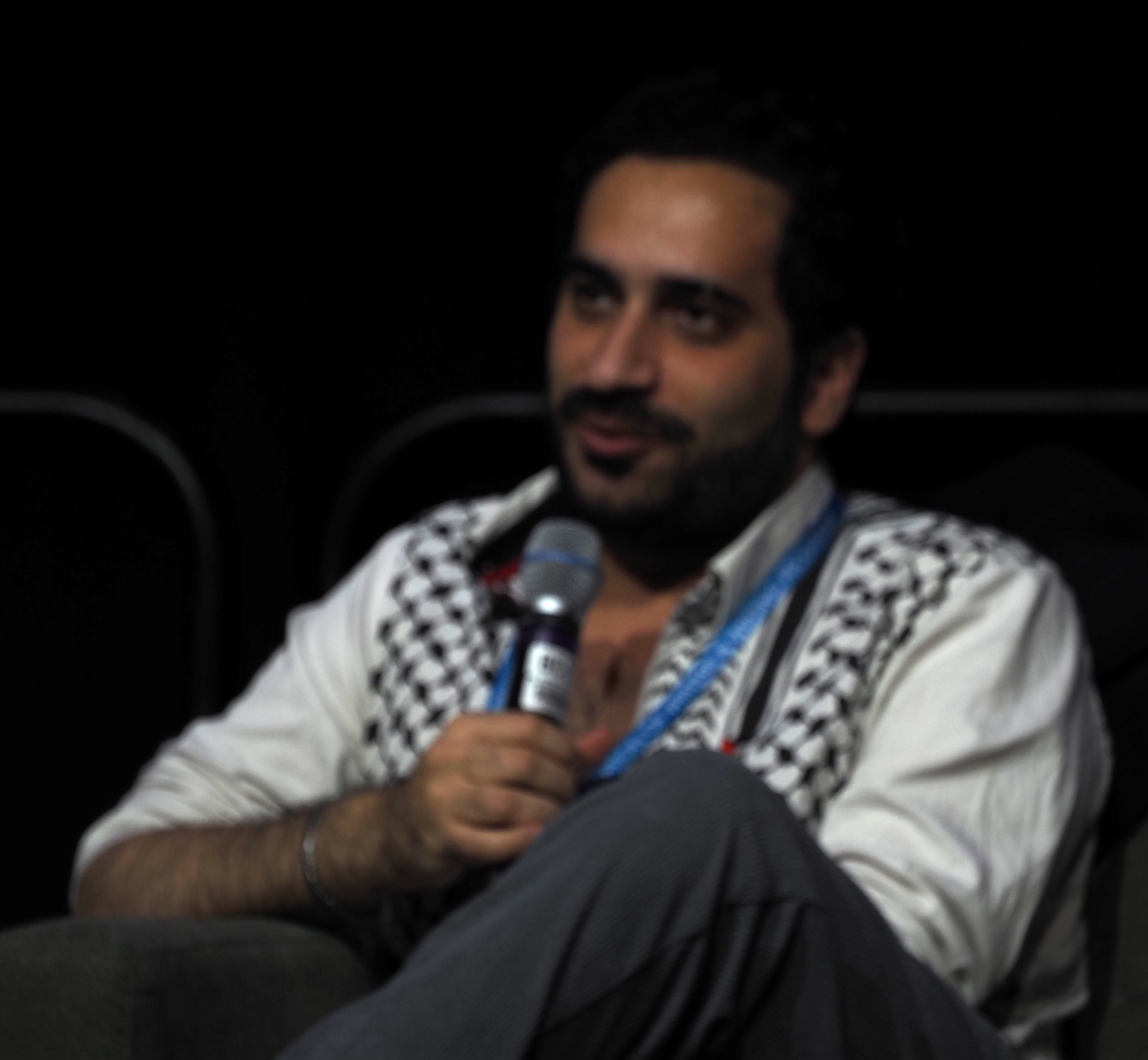
- Ashour at the 2026 AWP Conference
- Born: 1998 (age 27–28); Gaza
- Education: Al-Azhar University – Gaza
- Occupations: Poet; educator

Yahya Ashour (يحيى عاشور; born 1998) is a Palestinian poet and educator from Gaza. He writes primarily in Arabic and is the author of the English poetry e-book A Gaza of Siege & Genocide (Mizna, 2024). He is a visiting assistant professor at Pitzer College.

== Early life and education ==
Ashour was born in Gaza in 1998. He studied sociology and psychology at Al-Azhar University – Gaza and later worked as a creative writing mentor in Gaza.

== Career ==
Ashour published the Arabic-language poetry collection You Are a Window, They Are Clouds in 2018. His children's book That's Why Rayan Walks This Way won a 2022 Arab Children's Books Publishers Forum Award.

His poems have appeared in Arabic and in translation. Al-Araby Al-Jadeed published several of his Arabic poems and prose pieces between 2020 and 2023, and Michigan Quarterly Review published his poem "To-Do Lists" in 2024. His poem "When a Missile Lands", translated by Khaled Rajeh, was published by ArabLit in 2024 and later appeared in Letters from Gaza (Penguin Random House SEA, 2025).

Ashour's work has been included in anthologies of Palestinian writing and poetry, including Anthologie de la poésie palestinienne d’aujourd’hui, Heaven Looks Like Us, and You Must Live: New Poetry from Palestine. The Markaz Review discussed his poem "Scale of Catastrophe" in a review of You Must Live.

=== Displacement and work in the United States ===
In 2022, Ashour was a Fall Residency participant at the International Writing Program at the University of Iowa. He returned to the United States in September 2023 for the Palestine Writes Festival. Publishers Weekly reported that Ashour was in the U.S. on October 7, 2023, and was unable to return to Gaza; Copper Canyon Press later described him as having been stranded in Michigan when the Gaza war began. The Detroit Free Press reported that he was living in Ann Arbor, Michigan, in October 2024, and that his home in Gaza City was destroyed on October 12, 2023.

Mizna published A Gaza of Siege & Genocide in March 2024 and provided a fellowship to support Ashour. The Institute for Palestine Studies interviewed Ashour about the book, Arabic literary tradition, and writing while unable to return to Gaza, and The Harvard Crimson profiled him later that year.

In 2025, Ashour was UCLA's Marcia H. Howard Author in Residence and, since 2024, he is a visiting assistant professor of English and World Literature at Pitzer College. In January 2026, he appeared at the University of Southern California in conversation with Viet Thanh Nguyen.

== Selected works ==
=== Books ===
- You Are a Window, They Are Clouds (2018), poetry collection
- That's Why Rayan Walks This Way (2021), children's book
- A Gaza of Siege & Genocide (Mizna, 2024), poetry e-book

=== Selected anthology appearances ===
- Anthologie de la poésie palestinienne d’aujourd’hui (Points, 2022), translated by Abdellatif Laâbi and compiled by Yassin Adnan.
- Ask the Night for a Dream: Palestinian Writing from the Diaspora (Palestine Writes Press, 2024), edited by Susan Muaddi Darraj.
- Letters from Gaza: By the People, From the Year That Has Been (Penguin Random House SEA, 2025), compiled by Mahmoud Alshaer and Mohammed Al-Zaqzooq.
- Heaven Looks Like Us: Palestinian Poetry (Haymarket Books, 2025), edited by George Abraham and Noor Hindi.
- You Must Live: New Poetry from Palestine (Copper Canyon Press, 2025), edited by Sherah Bloor and Tayseer Abu Odeh.
