= Alan Heathcock =

American writer

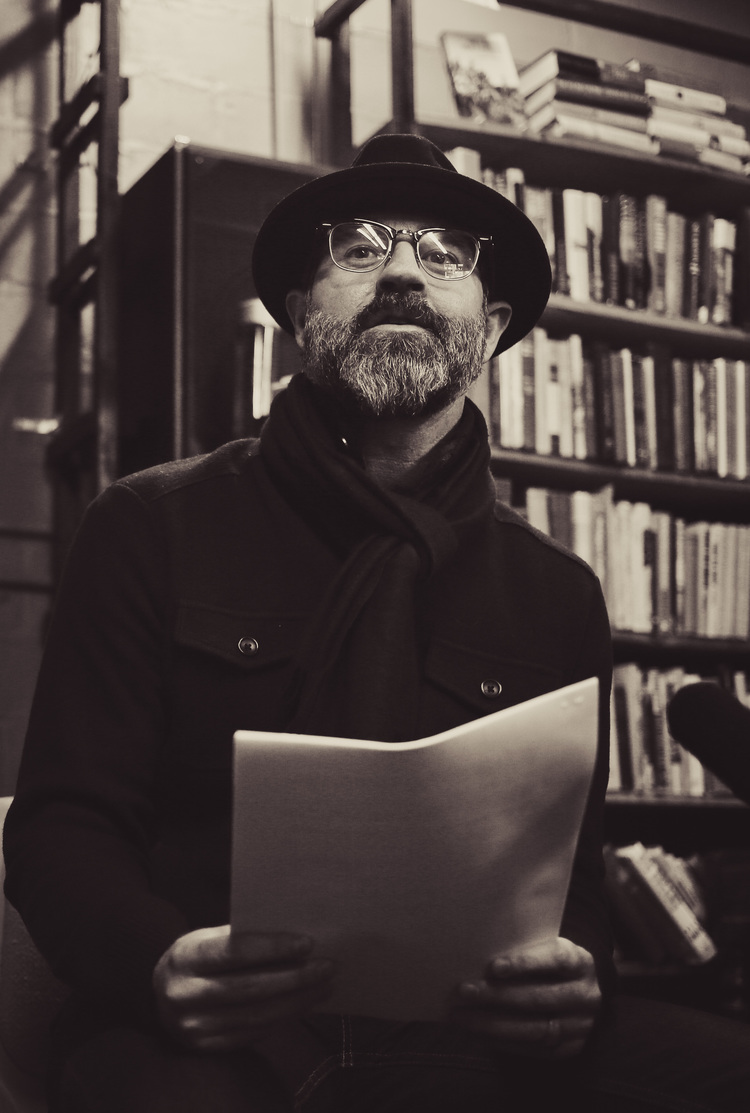
Alan Heathcock reading in Boise, Idaho (2013)

Alan Heathcock (born March 8, 1971) is an American fiction writer. He is the author of the acclaimed short story collection VOLT (2011) and the dystopian novel 40 (2022).

== Early life, education, and career ==
Heathcock grew up in the Chicago suburb of Hazel Crest, Illinois and attended the University of Iowa, where he graduated in 1993 with a Bachelor of Arts in journalism. He earned Master of Fine Arts degrees from both Bowling Green State University (1996), and Boise State University (2003). Heathcock teaches in the Master of Fine Arts Creative Writing program at the University of Nevada, Reno. He lives in Boise, Idaho.

== Notable works ==
Heathcock's first collection of short fiction, VOLT, was published with Graywolf Press in 2011. VOLT was selected as an Editor's Pick for both The New York Times Book Review and The Oxford American; a finalist for the Barnes & Noble Discover Award, as well as hailed by many critics as one of the best books of 2011, including Publishers Weekly, the Chicago Tribune, Salon.com, and GQ. VOLT also includes the story "Peacekeeper," which first appeared in the Fall 2005 issue of the Virginia Quarterly Review, and won Heathcock a National Magazine Award in 2006. A 2013 short film adaptation of "Smoke," one of the stories in VOLT, was directed by Cody Gittings and Stephen Heleker.

Heathcock's debut novel, 40, was published in 2022 by MacMillan to mostly favorable but some mixed reviews. The book follows the adventures of Mazzy Goodwin, a soldier in an apocalyptic near-future who miraculously grows angel wings from her back and becomes a pawn in a charismatic religious leader's attempts to rule America. Comparing the book to The Hunger Games, Kirkus Reviews notes that "[t]he dystopian ingredients are familiar, but Heathcock combines them in a potent metaphorical stew." The book was also featured in a New York Times article about climate change fiction.

== Bibliography ==
=== Books ===
- VOLT. Graywolf Press. 2011. ISBN 978-1-55597-577-7.
  - "The Staying Freight," Reprinted from Harvard Review 31, Fall 2006
  - "Fort Apache," Reprinted from Zoetrobe: All-Story, Fall 2008
  - “Smoke.” The Kenyon Review, vol. 29, no. 3, 2007, pp. 12–27
- 40. MCD. 2022. ISBN 978-0374100230.

=== Articles and essays ===
- "Our Summarative History of Quixotica," Harvard Review 22, Spring 2002
- "On Suffering," Kenyon Review Online, 2014
- "Shelter," Gulf Coast, Winter/Spring 2014
- "Zero Percent Water," Matter, September 2014

== Awards ==
- Whiting Award (2012)
- Boise Weekly Best Living Idaho Writer (2012)
- Spinetinglers Magazine, Best Short Story Collection (2012)
- GLCA New Writers Award (2012)
- Bread Loaf Writers' Conference, Shane Stevens Fellowship in Fiction (2011)
- Tin House Writers' Conference, Scholar (2010)
- Bread Loaf Writers' Conference, Carol Houck Fellowship in Fiction (2009)
- National Magazine Award, Fiction (2006)
