= Lauren Acampora =

American author

Lauren Acampora is an American novelist and short story writer. She is the author of The Wonder Garden, a collection of linked short stories, and the novels The Paper Wasp and The Hundred Waters, all published by Grove Atlantic.

== Biography ==
A native of Darien, Connecticut, Acampora attended Ox Ridge Elementary School, Middlesex Middle School, and Darien High School. She graduated from Brown University in 1997, and received a Master of Fine Arts from Brooklyn College. She lives in Westchester County, New York with her husband, the artist Thomas Doyle, and their daughter.

== Writing ==
Acampora's debut collection of linked stories, The Wonder Garden, was published by Grove Atlantic in 2015. The book won the GLCA New Writers Award. It was also a finalist for the New England Book Awards, was on the longlist for the 2015 Story Prize, and was a Barnes & Noble Discover Great New Writers selection. It was reviewed in publications such as The New York Times, The Boston Globe, and The Dallas Morning News and earned four starred pre-publication reviews from Publishers Weekly, Kirkus Reviews, Library Journal, and Booklist. In The Boston Globe, Priscilla Gilman described the book as a "weird, inspired, original collection of 13 interwoven short stories. It is reminiscent of John Cheever in its anatomizing of suburban ennui and of Ann Beattie in its bemused dissection of a colorful cast of eccentrics. But Acampora's is entirely her own book, as it is self-consciously of its own world: Set in the fictional town of Old Cranbury, 'a desirable suburb in a sterling school district, not too far from the city,' with a 'historic pedigree' dating back to the Puritans."

Acampora's debut novel, The Paper Wasp, was published by Grove Atlantic in 2019 and by Quercus in the United Kingdom. The novel tells the story of Abby Graven, a young woman in rural Michigan who becomes obsessed with her former high school friend, Elise VanDijk, who is now a Hollywood starlet living in Malibu, California. The book was longlisted for the Center for Fiction First Novel Prize and was reviewed by publications such as The New York Times, Time, The Irish Times, O Magazine, and Elle. Stephanie Zacharek wrote of the book in Time: "Acampora's prose has a seductive, pearlescent allure, even when she's addressing doomed friendships, friends who can never live up to our expectations, friends who betray." In The New York Times, Vanessa Friedman wrote: "Take 'The Talented Mr. Ripley,' cross it with 'Suspiria,' add a dash of 'La La Land' and mix it all at midnight and this arty psychological stalker novel is what might result."

Grove Atlantic published Acampora's third book, The Hundred Waters, in 2022. The novel centers on Louisa Rader, a former model and photographer in New York City. Having returned to her well-heeled hometown of Nearwater, Connecticut to raise a family, she becomes embroiled with the aristocratic Steigers and their troubled teenaged son, Gabriel, an artist and environmental activist. The novel was chosen as one of the best books of the year by Vogue. In a starred review in Booklist, Stephanie Turza wrote, "In this tightly paced novel that echoes Celeste Ng's Little Fires Everywhere, Tom Perrotta's Mrs. Fletcher, and A. Natasha Joukovsky's The Portrait of a Mirror, Acampora sets the idealism of youth against middle-age complacency and high-society reservations."

Acampora's short fiction has appeared in publications including The Paris Review, Guernica, New England Review, The Missouri Review, Prairie Schooner, and The Antioch Review. Her nonfiction has been published in The New York Times Book Review, Literary Hub, and NER Digital.

== Awards and recognition ==
=== Honors ===
- Fellowship, MacDowell
- Fellowship, Ucross Foundation
- Fellowship, Ledig House International Writers Residency at Art Omi
- Fellowship, Ragdale Foundation.
- Fellowship, New York State Council on the Arts / New York Foundation for the Arts (2021)

=== Literary awards ===
- Winner, Lawrence Foundation Award, Prairie Schooner (2013)
- Finalist, New England Book Award (2015)
- Winner, GLCA New Writers Award (2016)
- Finalist, Center for Fiction First Novel Prize (2019)

== Selected works ==
=== Novels ===
- The Wonder Garden (2015) ISBN 978-0-8021-2481-4
- The Paper Wasp (2019) ISBN 978-0-8021-4881-0
- The Hundred Waters (2022) ISBN 978-0-8021-6180-2
- The Animal Room (2026) ISBN 978-0-8021-6789-7

=== Short stories and essays ===
- "How Deep Is the Ocean?" short story in New England Review (2006)
- "Self Evident" short story in The Paris Review (2010)
- "The Third Skin" essay in NER Digital (2012)
- "Swarm" short story in The Missouri Review (2012)
- "Felt Life" short story in Prairie Schooner (2013)
- "Clair de Lune" essay in NER Digital (2015)
- "What, to the Writer, Are Dreams?" essay in Literary Hub (2019)
- The Paper Wasp novel excerpt in Guernica (2019)
- "The Elephant God" short story in New England Review (2019)
- "Nine Novels of Art and Seduction" essay in Literary Hub (2022)
- "I Really Didn't Want to Write This Promotional Essay Tied to My Book Release" essay in Literary Hub (2022)
