= Sumita Chakraborty =

Poet, essayist, and scholar

- Occupations: Poet, academic
- Writing career
- Language: English
- Genre: Poetry
- Notable work: Arrow
- Notable awards: Ruth Lilly and Dorothy Sargent Rosenberg Poetry Fellowship (2017); GLCA New Writers Award for Poetry (2022)

Sumita Chakraborty is an Indian American poet and academic. She is the author of the poetry collection Arrow, which won the 2022 GLCA New Writers Award for Poetry. She is an assistant professor of creative writing at the University of Virginia.

== Education and career ==
Chakraborty earned a B.A. from Wellesley College and a Ph.D. in English from Emory University. Before joining the University of Virginia, she taught at the University of Michigan as the Helen Zell Visiting professor in Poetry, and at North Carolina State University as an assistant professor of English.

In 2017, she received a Ruth Lilly and Dorothy Sargent Rosenberg Poetry Fellowship. She has also served as poetry editor of AGNI (magazine) and art editor of At Length.

In a 2021 interview with the Los Angeles Review of Books, Chakraborty said she was working on her first scholarly book, then titled Grave Dangers: Death, Ethics, and Poetics in the Anthropocene.

== Arrow ==
Chakraborty's debut poetry collection, Arrow, was published in 2020 by Alice James Books in the United States and Carcanet Press in the United Kingdom.

=== Reception ===
In a 2020 review for NCPR, Jeevika Verma wrote that Arrow "creates magic out of what hurts us most" and identified the long poem "Dear, Beloved" as central to the collection. Reviewing the collection in The Journal, Maya McOmie wrote that it centers on the death of the poet's sister. Writing for The New York Times, Elisa Gabbert called Arrow an "allusive and witty debut" and wrote that Chakraborty's poems are "full of life and joy" even as they "defy easy notions of aboutness".

== Awards and honors ==
- Ruth Lilly and Dorothy Sargent Rosenberg Poetry Fellowship, 2017
- Shortlisted for the Forward Prize for Best Single Poem for "And death demands a labor", 2018
- Arrow was a finalist for the Foreword Reviews INDIES Book of the Year Award in Poetry, 2020
- Seamus Heaney Poetry Prize for a First Collection for Arrow, 2021
- Great Lakes Colleges Association New Writers Award for Arrow, 2022
