= The Cheerleaders (GLOW wrestlers) =

Debbie Debutantee
- Born: Ann LaBree
- Professional wrestling career
- Debut: 1986
- Retired: Unknown

Susie Spirit
- Born: Laurie Thompson
- Professional wrestling career
- Debut: 1986
- Retired: Unknown

Vicky Victory
- Born: Peach Janae
- Professional wrestling career
- Debut: 1989
- Retired: Unknown

Cheyenne Cher
- Born: Dee Chocktoot
- Professional wrestling career
- Debut: 1989
- Retired: Unknown

The Glow Cheerleaders were four American female professional wrestlers. They were four GLOW good girls (babyface) consisting of two different tag teams who wrestled for Gorgeous Ladies of Wrestling (GLOW) at different times known as Debbie Debutantee, Susie Spirit, Cheyenne Cher, and Vicky Victory, competing from seasons 1–4, from 1986 to 1992, during the entire run of GLOW.

== Original cheerleaders (Debbie Debutantee and Susie Spirit) ==
The Gorgeous Ladies of Wrestling (GLOW) debuted in 1986. Debutantee and Spirit competed during seasons one and two. Spirit would do skits where she would sing and dance, and during he raps she would often talk about he cheerleading skills. Debutantee and Spirit would do cartwheels and backflips on their way to the ring and during the bouts.

Debbie Debutantee and Sprit would team with fellow Glow good girls such as Americana and Tina Ferrari.

When the cheerleaders team together they would defeat such teams as Palestina & Princess Of Darkness, The Heavy Metal Sisters (Chainsaw & Spike), The Soul Patrol (Adore & Envy), and Jungle Woman & Spanish Red.

Sprit also would team with fellow GLOW girl Americana around this time as the All Americans.

The team of Spirit and Debutantee disbanded after Spirt suffered a career ending elbow injury after jumping off the top rope and never wrestled again.

== Second cheerleaders (Cheyenne Cher and Vicky Victory) ==
Dee Chocktoot, known as Cheyenne Cher, is Native American. Cher and Victory would often do cheerleading themes before the matches and just like Debutantee and Spirit would do cartwheels and backflips on their way to the ring and during the bouts. They would team against such teams as MTV and Big Bad Mama, and Hollywood and Broadway Rose. In one of her raps Victory would claim that her and Cher were the best team who you would see.

In another one of Victory's raps she said that she was the new cheerleader in GLOW and "Debbie and Susie took me under their wing". Both Cher and Victory would do skits. Cher did a skit where she would cite Native Indian Folklore, while Victory would do a skit called "mirror mirror" where she would get pied in the face. Cher would later win the Glow crown in a tournament by defeating Godiva, but would later lose to crown to Daisy.

== Aftermath ==
After Glow Wrestling went out of business in 1990, Cher and Victory broke up and started wrestling in other organizations.

== Championships and accomplishments ==
- Gorgeous Ladies of Wrestling
  - Cheyenne Cher – GLOW Crown Championship (1 time)
