= Great Lakes Colleges Association =

American academic consortium

- Abbreviation: GLCA
- Formation: 1962
- Type: Higher education consortium
- Legal status: 501(c)(3) nonprofit organization
- Headquarters: Ann Arbor, Michigan, U.S.
- Region served: Indiana, Michigan, Ohio, and Pennsylvania
- Website: www.glca.org

The Great Lakes Colleges Association (GLCA) is a consortium of liberal arts colleges located in the states around the Great Lakes. The GLCA's offices are located in Ann Arbor, Michigan, and its schools are located in Indiana, Michigan, Ohio, and Pennsylvania. It was chartered in the state of Michigan and incorporated as a 501(c)(3) non-profit organization in 1962. Its stated mission is to take actions that will help strengthen and preserve its colleges, being a leading force on behalf of education in the tradition of the liberal arts and sciences.

The organization is the founder and administrator of the Global Liberal Arts Alliance.

== Operations ==
GLCA operates the GLCA-TRE (Tuition Remission Exchange) program. Its member colleges, along with other participating colleges, take part in the program, for a total of 21 institutions. Students eligible for tuition remission because of parental employment at one of the participating colleges may receive tuition remission at one of the other colleges in the exchange.

=== New Writers Award ===
The GLCA administers the New Writers Award, founded in 1970, which recognizes authors for their first books in poetry, fiction, and creative nonfiction. Judges are faculty members at GLCA member colleges, and winners are invited to visit GLCA campuses for readings and discussions. According to Poets & Writers, three prizes are awarded annually, and winners receive campus-visit travel support and an honorarium of at least $500. Notable recipients include Alice Munro (1974), who later won the Nobel Prize in Literature in 2013, and Louise Erdrich (1985), who later won the Pulitzer Prize for Fiction for The Night Watchman.

Winners of the GLCA New Writers Award (1970–present)
Year	Poetry	Fiction	Creative nonfiction
2026	Tarik Dobbs — Nazar Boy: Poems	Alisa Alering — Smothermoss	Hala Alyan — I'll Tell You When I'm Home
2025	Sarah Ghazal Ali — Theophanies	Jessica Elisheva Emerson — Olive Days	KB Brookins — Pretty
2024	Jesse Nathan — Eggtooth	D.K. Nnuro — What Napoleon Could Not Do	Roger Reeves — Dark Days
2023	James Fujinami Moore — indecent hours	Tsering Yangzom Lama — We Measure the Earth with Our Bodies	Lars Horn — Voice of the Fish: A Lyric Essay
2022	Sumita Chakraborty — Arrow	Michael X. Wang — Further News of Defeat	Melissa Valentine — The Names of All the Flowers
2021	Marianne Chan — All Heathens	Gabriel Bump — Everywhere You Don’t Belong	Nina Boutsikaris — I’m Trying to Tell You I’m Sorry
2020	Aaron Coleman — Threat Come Close	Eric Schlich — Quantum Convention	Sarah Viren — Mine: Essays
2019	Marcelo Hernandez Castillo — Cenzontle	Dawn Davies — Mothers of Sparta: A Memoir in Pieces	Lesley Nneka Arimah — What It Means When a Man Falls from the Sky
2018	Chen Chen — When I Grow Up I Want to Be a List of Further Possibilities	Emily Fridlund — History of Wolves	Hilary Plum — Watchfires
2017	Nate Marshall — Wild Hundreds	Charles M. Boyer — History’s Child	Randall Horton — Hook
2016	Natalie Scenters-Zapico — The Verging Cities	Lauren Acampora — The Wonder Garden	Shulem Deen — All Who Go Do Not Return
2015	Tarfia Faizullah — Seam	David James Poissant — The Heaven of Animals	Angela Pelster — Limber
2014	Natalie Shapero — No Object	E.J. Levy — Love, in Theory	Joe Wilkins — The Mountain and the Fathers: Growing Up on the Big Dry
2013	Rowan Ricardo Phillips — The Ground	Ismet Prcic — Shards	Benjamin Busch — Dust to Dust
2012	Shane Book — Ceiling of Sticks	Alan Heathcock — Volt	Danielle Cadena Deulen — The Riots
2011	Nick Lantz — We Don’t Know We Don’t Know	Goldie Goldbloom — Toads’ Museum of Freaks and Wonders	Randi Davenport — The Boy Who Loved Tornadoes
2010	Kevin McFadden — Hardscrabble	Josh Weil — The New Valley	Diana Joseph — I’m Sorry You Feel That Way
2009	Aracelis Girmay — Teeth	Don Waters — Desert Gothic	Melissa J. Delbridge — Family Bible
2008	Lynne Thompson — Beg No Pardon	Andy Mozina — The Women Were Leaving the Men	Ander Monson — Neck Deep and Other Predicaments
2007	Jay Hopler — Green Squall	Tony D’Souza — Whiteman	—
2006	Anele Rubin — Trying to Speak	David Harris Ebenbach — Between Camelots	—
2005	Dana Roeser — Beautiful Motion	Scott Nadelson — Saving Stanley: The Brickman Stories	—
2004	Mary Szybist — Granted	Patricia Sarrifian Ward — The Bullet Collection	—
2003	Beth Ann Fennelly — Open House	Kellie Wells — Compression Scars	—
2002	Mong-Lan — Song of the Cicadas	Elizabeth Rosner — The Speed of Light	—
2001	Tenaya Darlington — Madame Deluxe	Michael Zadoorian — Secondhand	—
2000	Dana Levin — In the Surgical Theatre	William Oren — Zombi, You My Love	—
1999	Craig Arnold — Shells	Becky Hagenston — A Gram of Mars	—
1998	Mary Jo Bang — Apology for Want	Alison McGhee — Rainlight	—
1997	Juanita Brunk — Brief Landing on the Earth’s Surface	Brad Watson — Last Days of the Dog-Men	—
1996	Lynn Powell — Old & New Testaments	Geoffrey Becker — Dangerous Men	—
1995	Alice Anderson — Human Nature	Terese Svoboda — Cannibal	—
1994	Kim Addonizio — The Philosopher’s Club	—	—
1993	Julia Kasdorf — Sleeping Preacher	Jane McCafferty — Director of the World and Other Stories	—
1992	Mary Stewart Hammond — Out of Canaan	Charlotte Watson Sherman — Killing Color	—
1991	Daniel Hall — Hermit With Landscape	Susan Straight — Aquaboogie	—
1990	Stefanie Marlis — Slow Joy	William Patrick — Roxa	—
1989	Fleda Brown Jackson — Fishing With Blood	Jane Hamilton — The Book of Ruth	—
1988	Charlie Smith — Red Roads	Brett Laidlaw — Three Nights in the Heart of the Earth	—
1987	James McKean — Headlong	Gabrielle Burton — Heartbreak Hotel	—
1986	Andrew Hudgins — Saints and Sinners	Pamela Painter — Getting to Know the Weather	—
1985	Lynn Emanuel — Hotel Fiesta	Louise Erdrich — Love Medicine	—
1984	Ralph Burns — Us	Charles Dickinson — Waltz in Marathon	—
1983	Maria Flook — Reckless Wedding	Michael Joyce — The War Outside Ireland	—
1982	Jared Carter — Work, for the Night is Coming	Annabel Thomas — The Phototropic Woman	—
1981	Jorie Graham — Hybrids of Plants and Ghosts	Mary Hedin — Fly Away Home	—
1980	Robert Bohm — In the Americas	Eve Shelnutt — The Love Child	—
1979	Leslie Ullman — Natural Histories	Caroline Richards — Sweet Country	—
1978	Eugene Ruggles — The Lifeguard in the Snow	Jonathan Penner — Going Blind	—
1977	David St. John — Hush	Richard Ford — A Piece of My Heart	—
1976	Betty Adcock — Walking Out	Rosellen Brown — The Autobiography of My Mother	—
1975	Elisauitta Ritchie — Tightening the Circle Over Eel Country	Hilma Wolitzer — Ending	—
1974	—	Margaret Craven — I Heard an Owl Call My Name; Alice Munro — Dance of the Happy Shades	—
1973	Daniel Halpern — Traveling on Credit	Inge Trachtenberg — So Slow the Dawning; Clark Blaise — A North American Education	—
1972	Colette Inez — The Woman Who Loved Worms	Theodore Weesner — The Car Thief	—
1971	David Henderson — De Mayor of Harlem	James Park Sloan — War Games	—
1970	—	Elizabeth Cullinan — House of Gold	—

The Philadelphia Center, which offers an off-campus study program with the opportunity to gain college credit while living and learning independently in Philadelphia, Pennsylvania, is managed and operated by Albion College in partnership with the GLCA.

In 2008, the consortium extended membership to Allegheny College and, later, Washington & Jefferson College.

== Member institutions ==
The GLCA's member institutions are:

- Albion College
- Allegheny College
- DePauw University
- Earlham College
- Hope College
- Kalamazoo College
- Kenyon College
- Oberlin College
- Ohio Wesleyan University
- Wabash College
- Washington and Jefferson College
- College of Wooster
