= What Napoleon Could Not Do =

2023 novel by D. K. Nnuro

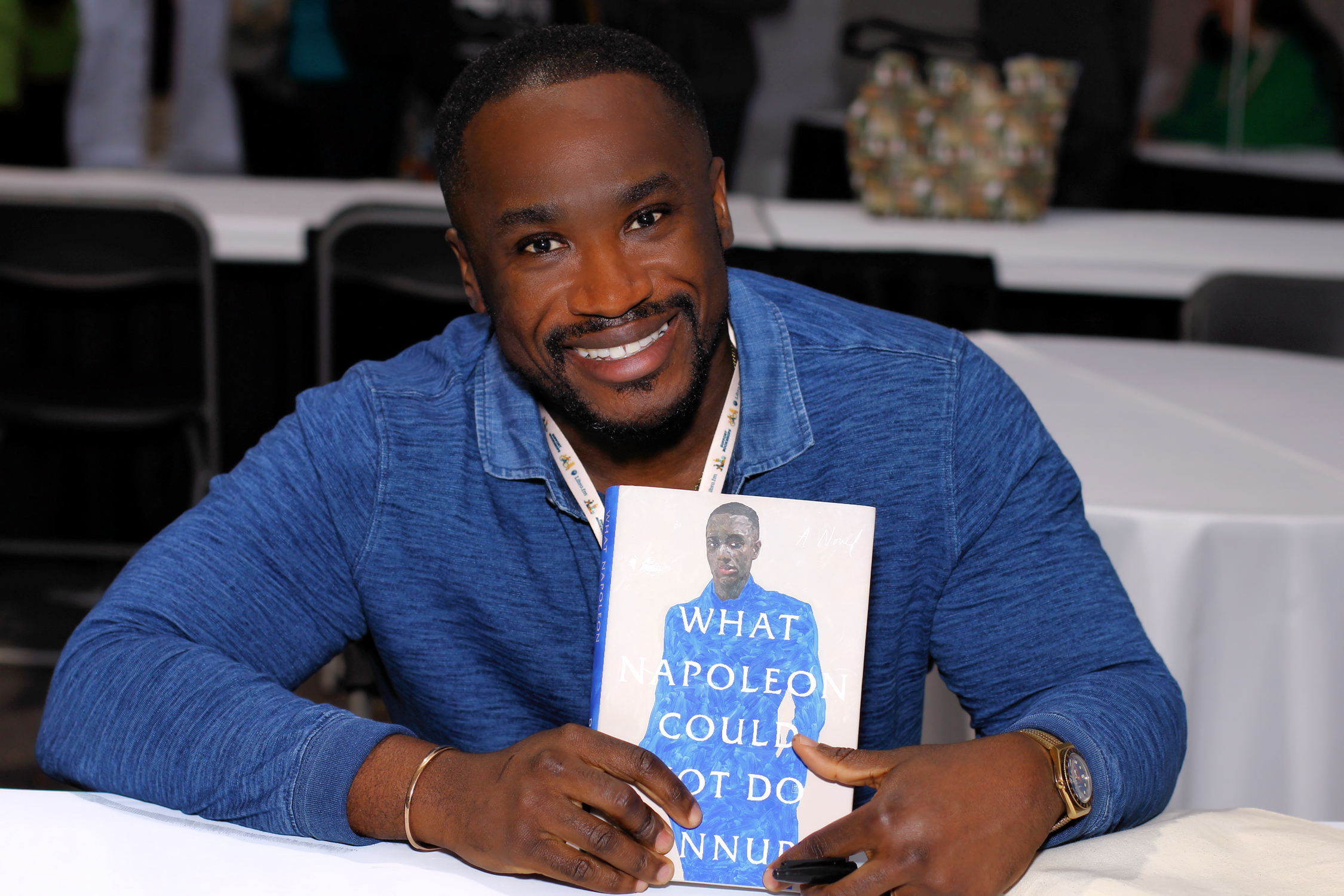
- Author DK Nnuro at the 2023 Texas Book Festival
- Author: D. K. Nnuro
- Language: English
- Genre: Literary fiction
- Publisher: Riverhead
- Publication date: February 7, 2023
- Publication place: US
- Media type: Print
- Pages: 368
- ISBN: 978-0-593-42036-2

What Napoleon Could Not Do is a literary fiction novel written by Ghanaian-American novelist D. K. Nnuro. His debut novel, it was published by Riverhead Books in February 2023.
