= Julian Moynahan =

American writer and critic (1925–2014)

- Julian Moynahan
- Born: Julian Lane Moynahan; March 21, 1925; Cambridge, Massachusetts, U.S.
- Died: March 21, 2014 (aged 89); New Jersey, U.S.
- Education: Harvard University (A.B., A.M., Ph.D.)
- Occupation: Professor
- Years active: 1954–2005

Julian Lane Moynahan (March 21, 1925 – March 21, 2014) was an American academic, librarian, literary critic, poet, and novelist. Much of Moynahan's academic work was focussed on D. H. Lawrence and Vladimir Nabokov. He was active as a book reviewer for leading publications on both sides of the Atlantic and was awarded a Guggenheim Fellowship in 1983.

== Early life ==
Moynahan was born in Cambridge, Massachusetts, United States, in 1925; at the time of the 1940 census, Moynahan was living in Walden Street with his mother, Mary, his eighteen-year-old sister, Anne, and sixteen-year-old brother, Joseph.

Moynahan was both an undergraduate and a graduate at Harvard, where he took the degrees of AB (1946), AM (1951) and PhD (1957). While there, he met Elizabeth Reilly, a student at Radcliffe who became an architect, and they had three daughters. Moynahan's early work was as a librarian in the Boston Public Library.

== Career ==
In 1954, Moynahan was an instructor in English at Amherst College. In 1959, he was appointed for three years to a Bicentennial Preceptorship at Princeton University. He went on to become a lecturer at Princeton, Harvard, and University College Dublin, and by 1969 was professor of English literature at Rutgers University. In 1975 he was reported to be both professor and librarian.

In 1966, Moynahan was awarded a National Endowment for the Arts Creative Writing Fellowship. In 1969, a reviewer of his second novel wrote that despite being "disguised as an English professor at Rutgers", he was really "a nonstop Irish-American storyteller", gadding from one character to another, with a fondness for black comedy.

A literary critic, Moynahan wrote book reviews and literary criticism for The New York Times Book Review, The New York Review of Books, The Washington Post Book World, and the American Irish Historical Society's journal, in the United States, and for The Observer, New Statesman, The Times Literary Supplement, in London. He also served on the jury of the Pulitzer Prize for Fiction and was a published poet.

Much of Moynahan's academic work was focussed on D. H. Lawrence and Vladimir Nabokov. His views on Lawrence were mixed, and he found The Plumed Serpent to be "the most padded and redundant" of his works. In 1975, Joseph Frank invited Moynahan to give three lectures at Princeton on Anglo-Irish writers, and from this a third specialism developed. He struck up friendships with Seán Ó Faoláin and Benedict Kiely. Two weeks after Nabokov's funeral at Montreux, an American memorial event was held at the McGraw Hill auditorium in New York, and some 500 people heard Alfred Appel, Alfred Kazin, John Updike, Dmitri Nabokov, Moynahan, and Harold McGraw pay tribute.

Moynahan's most prolific period was the 1960s and 1970s. In 1983, he was given a Guggenheim Fellowship, and after that his only major publication was Anglo-Irish: The Literary Imagination in a Hyphenated Culture (1995). In this survey of the whole field of Anglo-Irish literature, there are chapters on Elizabeth Bowen, Maria Edgeworth, Charles Lever, Sheridan Le Fanu, C. R. Maturin, George Moore, Somerville and Ross, W. B. Yeats, and Samuel Beckett, and historical summaries. Moynahan finds that the women writers, Edgeworth, Somerville and Ross, and Bowen, were a major force in the development of literary imagination. For him, The Real Charlotte is a contender for the title of best Irish novel before Joyce.

By 2005, Moynahan had retired and was a professor emeritus at Rutgers. After he died of pneumonia in March 2014, on his 89th birthday, an obituary by Stuart Mitchner in Town Topics called him witty, dashing, roguish, and breezy, "refreshingly counter to the remote, buttoned-up academic".

Moynahan and his wife were married for 68 years. She survived him until September 2019.

== Awards ==
- Ingram Merrill Foundation Award
- National Endowment for the Arts Creative Writing Fellowship, 1966
- Guggenheim Fellowship, 1983

== Bibliography ==
=== Literary criticism ===
- The Deed of Life: the Novels and Tales of D. H. Lawrence (Princeton University Press and Oxford University Press, 1963, ISBN 9780691060231)
- Vladimir Nabokov (University of Minnesota Press, 1971, ISBN 9781452911922)
- Alfred Appel, Julian L. Moynahan, Alfred Kazin, John Updike, Dmitri Nabokov, In Memoriam: Vladimir Nabokov 1899–1977 (New York: McGraw-Hill, 1977, ISBN 978-0070457089)
- Sons and Lovers: Text, Background, and Criticism (London: Penguin, 1977, ISBN 9780140155044)
- The Portable Thomas Hardy (New York: Viking, 1977, ISBN 978-0670703401)
- Anglo-Irish: The Literary Imagination in a Hyphenated Culture (Princeton: Princeton University Press, 1995, ISBN 978-0691037578)

=== Novels ===
- Sisters and Brothers (New York: Random House, 1960, ASIN B001SQBMCU)
- Pairing Off (New York: William Morrow and Company, 1969, ISBN 9780434479900)
- Garden State (New York: Little, Brown, 1973, ISBN 9780316586979)
- Where Land and Water Meet (New York: William Morrow, 1979, ISBN 9780688034467)

=== Selected articles ===
- 'The Mayor of Casterbridge and the Old Testament's First Book of Samuel: A Study of Some Literary Relationships', in PMLA, 71, 1 (March 1956), 18–30
- 'Lady Chatterley's Lover: The Deed of Life', in ELH, 26, 1 (March 1959), 66–90
- 'The Hero's Guilt: The Case of Great Expectations ', in Essays in Criticism, X, 1 (January 1960), 60–79
- 'Pastoralism as Culture and Counter-Culture in English Fiction, 1800–1928', in Novel: A Forum on Fiction, 6 (Fall 1972), 20–35
- 'Hermeneutic Hesitation: A Dialogue between Geoffrey Hartman & Julian Moynahan', in Novel: A Forum on Fiction, 12, 2 (Winter 1979), 101–112
- 'The Battle of Aughrim: A Commentary', in Irish University Review, 13, 1 (Spring 1983), 103-113
