= Mizna =

Nonprofit arts organization in Saint Paul, Minnesota

- مُزْنَة
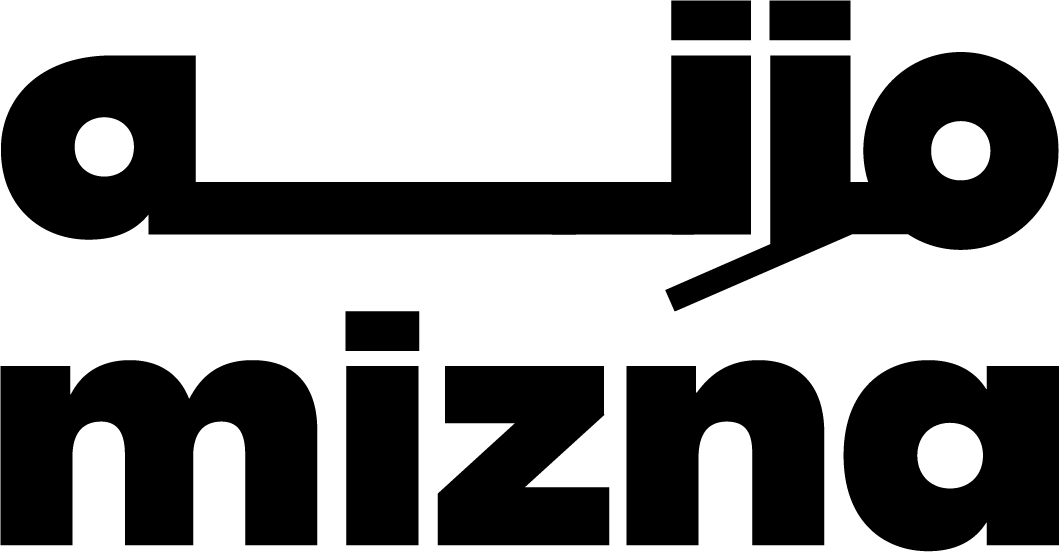
- Founded: 1999; 27 years ago
- Founders: Kathryn Haddad and Saleh Abudayyeh
- Type: 501(c)(3) nonprofit arts organization
- Location: Saint Paul, Minnesota, U.S.
- Products: Mizna
- Services: Literary publishing; film festival production; arts programming
- Executive and artistic director: Lana Barkawi
- Website: mizna.org

Mizna (مُزْنَة; lit. "cloud") is a 501(c)(3) nonprofit arts organization based in Saint Paul, Minnesota. It publishes Arab and Southwest Asian and North African (SWANA) literature and art, and presents film and arts programming. Its principal programs include the literary magazine Mizna and the Twin Cities Arab Film Festival.

== History ==
Mizna developed from a community newsletter connected to the Minnesota chapter of the American-Arab Anti-Discrimination Committee. Kathryn Haddad and Saleh Abudayyeh, who were ADC volunteers, assembled the newsletter before founding Mizna as a literary journal.

In 1999, Mizna published the first issue of Mizna: Prose, Poetry, and Art Exploring Arab America. In 2001, Minnesota Public Radio described Mizna as a Minneapolis-published literary journal featuring Arab American writing. NPR later reported that the journal was a venue for writers and artists responding to representations of the Middle East and its people.

In 2003, Mizna launched the Twin Cities Arab Film Festival. The organization later expanded its public programming to include readings, film series, performances, public art commissions, classes, workshops, and community events.

In 2019, Mizna co-presented the exhibition History Is Not Here: Art and the Arab Imaginary with the Minnesota Museum of American Art. The exhibition was curated by Heba Y. Amin and Maymanah Farhat.

== Publishing ==
Mizna publishes the biannual literary and art journal Mizna, founded in 1999. NPR described it in 2019 as the first Arab American literary journal in the United States. Mizna also publishes Mizna Online, a digital platform for literary and multidisciplinary work.

In 2021, the journal received the CLMP Firecracker Award for magazines/general excellence. In 2023, it received the Whiting Literary Magazine Prize.

In 2024, Mizna published Gazan poet Yahya Ashour's poetry e-book A Gaza of Siege & Genocide and announced an inaugural fellowship to support him. The e-book was later discussed in an Institute for Palestine Studies interview with Ashour and in a profile of Ashour in The Harvard Crimson.

== Twin Cities Arab Film Festival programming ==
Mizna launched the Twin Cities Arab Film Festival in 2003. The festival presents cinema by Arab and SWANA filmmakers from the region and diaspora. Arts Midwest described the journal and film festival as Mizna's two flagship programs.

In 2013, Minnesota Public Radio covered the festival as a Twin Cities arts event. The festival includes juried prizes, audience awards, and filmmaker appearances.

== Funding and awards ==
In 2016, Mizna received a Knight Arts Challenge St. Paul grant for Arab Film Fest: The St. Paul Edition. In 2017, it received a Knight Arts Challenge grant for Art and Arab America: The New Millennium, a retrospective exhibition and related programming at the Minnesota Museum of American Art.

In 2018, Mizna received the Sally Award for Social Impact from the Ordway Center for the Performing Arts. In 2021, it was named a Regional Cultural Treasure through a Ford Foundation and McKnight Foundation initiative supporting Black, Indigenous, Latinx, and Asian American-led arts organizations in Minnesota.
