= Ruth Doan MacDougall =

American novelist

Ruth Doan MacDougall, born near Laconia, New Hampshire, is an American author. She is the daughter of hiking writer Daniel Doan.

== Bibliography ==
=== Novels ===
- The Lilting House (Bobbs-Merrill)
- The Cost of Living ( Putnam; Avon)
- One Minus One (Putnam; Avon)
- The Cheerleader (Putnam; Bantam; Frigate Books)
- Wife and Mother (Putnam; Avon)
- Aunt Pleasantine (Harper; Avon)
- The Flowers of the Forest (Atheneum; Berkley)
- A Lovely Time Was Had By All (Atheneum)
- Snowy (St. Martin’s Press; Frigate Books)
- A Woman Who Loved Lindbergh (Electronic edition, Frigate Books)
- Henrietta Snow (Frigate Books)
- The Husband Bench (Frigate Books)
