= Anne Carson bibliography =

Anne Carson is a Canadian poet, essayist, classicist, professor, and Nobel Laureate. She has written many works including translations.

== Writings ==
Scholarship, poetry, essays, novels, scripts, libretti, plays, and comic books
| Title | Year | Notes | Ref. |
|---|---|---|---|
| Odi et Amo Ergo Sum | 1981 | Doctoral thesis; "I Hate and I Love, Therefore I Am" | |
| Canicula di Anna | 1984 | Carson's first published poetry | |
| Eros the Bittersweet: An Essay | 1986 | A reworking of Carson's doctoral thesis | |
| Short Talks | 1992 | 2015 edition includes an introduction by Margaret Christakos, and an afterword by Carson | |
| Glass, Irony, and God | 1995 | With an introduction by Guy Davenport; includes "The Glass Essay" | |
| Plainwater: Essays and Poetry | 1995 | Includes Canicula di Anna, and selections from Short Talks | |
| Autobiography of Red: A Novel in Verse | 1998 | Based on surviving fragments of the poem Geryoneis by Stesichorus | |
| Glass and God | 1998 | Includes Short Talks, and selections from Glass, Irony, and God | |
| Economy of the Unlost (Reading Simonides of Keos with Paul Celan) | 1999 | Includes translations of poems by Simonides and Paul Celan | |
| Men in the Off Hours | 2000 | Includes epitaphs, poems, verse essays, and drafts of scripts | |
| The Beauty of the Husband: A Fictional Essay in 29 Tangos | 2001 | Dedicated to John Keats | |
| The Mirror of Simple Souls: An Opera Installation (Libretto) | 2003 | Handmade libretto; art and design by Kim Anno | |
| Decreation: Poetry, Essays, Opera | 2005 | Includes The Mirror of Simple Souls | |
| Nox | 2010 | Includes translation of Catullus 101 | |
| Antigonick (Sophokles) | 2012 | A version of Antigone by Sophocles; illustrated by Bianca Stone; 2015 edition includes an introduction by Carson ("The Task of the Translator of Antigone") | |
| Red Doc> | 2013 | A follow-up to Autobiography of Red | |
| Nay Rather | 2013 | "Variations on the Right to Remain Silent" (with seven translations of Ibycus Fragment 286), and "By Chance the Cycladic People" illustrated by Lanfranco Quadrio | |
| The Albertine Workout | 2014 | On Albertine, a character in Marcel Proust's In Search of Lost Time; art and design of One Crow Press edition by Kim Anno | |
| Float | 2016 | A collection of 22 chapbooks; includes texts of Nay Rather | |
| The Mile-Long Opera: A Biography of 7 O'Clock | 2018 | Libretto by Carson, with prose pieces by Claudia Rankine | |
| Norma Jeane Baker of Troy | 2019 | A version of Helen by Euripides, drawing on the life of Marilyn Monroe | |
| The Trojan Women: A Comic | 2021 | A comic-book version of The Trojan Women by Euripides, with artwork by Rosanna Bruno | |
| H of H Playbook | 2021 | About Herakles by Euripides, illustrated by Carson | |
| Wrong Norma | 2024 | As Carson writes: “Wrong Norma is a collection of writings about different things, like Joseph Conrad, Guantánamo, Flaubert, snow, poverty, Roget’s Thesaurus, my Dad, Saturday night. The pieces are not linked. That’s why I’ve called them ‘wrong.’” | |
| The Gender of Sound | 2025 | Originally published in Glass, Irony, and God | |

== Translations ==
Ancient Greek texts
| Title | Year | Source material | Notes | Ref. |
|---|---|---|---|---|
| Sophocles, Electra | 2001 | Electra by Sophocles | With introduction and notes by Michael Shaw | |
| If Not, Winter: Fragments of Sappho | 2002 | The poetry of Sappho | With introduction and notes by Carson; 2019 Folio Society edition includes images by Jenny Holzer | |
| Grief Lessons: Four Plays by Euripides; Herakles, Hekabe, Hippolytos, Alkestis | 2006 | Herakles, Hecuba, Hippolytus, and Alcestis by Euripides | With five prefaces, and a text by Carson ("Why I Wrote Two Plays About Phaidra, by Euripides") | |
| An Oresteia; Agamemnon by Aiskhylos, Elektra by Sophokles, Orestes by Euripides | 2009 | Agamemnon by Aeschylus; Electra by Sophocles; Orestes by Euripides | With four introductions and a note by Carson | |
| Euripides, Iphigenia Among the Taurians | 2014 | Iphigenia in Tauris by Euripides | With introduction by Glenn W. Most and Mark Griffith | |
| Sophokles, Antigone | 2015 | Antigone by Sophocles | With a note by Carson | |
| Euripides, Bakkhai | 2015 | The Bacchae by Euripides | With a note by Carson ("I Wish I Were Two Dogs Then I Could Play With Me") | |

== Contributions ==
=== Books and broadsides ===
| Title | Year | Publication and notes | Type | Ref. |
|---|---|---|---|---|
| "How Bad a Poem is Semonides Fragment I?" | 1984 | Greek Poetry and Philosophy: Studies in Honour of Leonard Woodbury; Edited by Douglas E. Gerber | Scholarship | |
| "Syracuse and the Monies of Simonides" | 1989 | Syracuse, the Fairest Greek City: Ancient Art from the Museo Archeologico Regionale 'Paolo Orsi'; Edited by Bonna Daix Wescoat | Essay | |
| "Putting Her in Her Place: Woman, Dirt, and Desire" | 1990 | Before Sexuality: The Construction of Erotic Experience in the Ancient Greek World; Edited by David M. Halperin, John J. Winkler, and Froma Zeitlin | Essay | |
| "Simonides Painter" | 1992 | Innovations of Antiquity; Edited by Ralph Hexter and Daniel Selden | Essay | |
| "Screaming in Translation: The Elektra of Sophokles" | 1996 | Sophocles' "Electra" in Performance; Edited by Francis M. Dunn | Essay | |
| "Justice of Aphrodite in Sappho I" | 1996 | Reading Sappho: Contemporary Approaches; Edited by Ellen Greene | Essay | |
| "Sappho Shock" | 1997 | Dwelling in Possibility: Women Poets and Critics on Poetry; Edited by Yopie Prins and Maeera Shreiber | Essay | |
| "The Gender of Sound" | 1998 | Cassandra: Voices from the Inside; Edited by Freda Guttman | Essay | |
| "Dirt and Desire: The Phenomenology of Female Pollution in Antiquity" | 1999 | Constructions of the Classical Body; Edited by James I. Porter | Essay | |
| "Quadrat I and II" | 2000 | Writers at the Movies: Twenty-six Contemporary Authors Celebrate; Twenty-six Memorable Movies; Edited by Jim Shepard | Poetry | |
| "Strange Hour, Outcast Hour" | 2001 | The Threepenny Review; Broadside designed by Noreen Fukumori; alongside excerpt from "On the Strange, the Weird, and the Uncanny" by Adam Phillips | Broadside | |
| "Answer Scars: My Roni Horn Project, An Optional Comic, by AC" | 2004 | Wonderwater (Alice Offshore) by Roni Horn; Includes "Hö Comix" insert by Carson | Poetry | |
| "Soundtrack" | 2004 | Subtitles: On the Foreignness of Film; Edited by Ian Balfour and Atom Egoyan | Writings | |
| "Introduction" | 2006 | It by Inger Christensen; Translated by Susanna Nied | Preface | |
| "Fourth Choral Ode from Euripides' Hippolytos" | 2006 | Broadside designed by Lettre Sauvage | Broadside | |
| "could", "double", "her", "then", "too" | 2009 | Roni Horn aka Roni Horn: Subject Index; Edited by Beth Huseman | Poetry | |
| "The Little Maid and the Gentleman, or, We Are Seven, William Wordsworth" | 2011 | Know the Past, Find the Future: The New York Public Library at 100; Edited by Caro Llewellyn | Poetry | |
| "The Goat at Midnight" | 2011 | Sixty-Six Books: 21st-Century Writers Speak to the King James Bible; In response to the Book of Jude; edited by Christopher Haydon, Rachel Holmes, Ben Power, and Josie Rourke | Poetry | |
| "Pinplay" | 2011 | Elliott Hundley: The Bacchae; A version of Euripides' The Bacchae, alongside contributions by Christopher Bedford and Richard Meyer; edited by Anne Bremner | Poetry | |
| "The Withness of the Body" | 2012 | Boat by Laurie Anderson; Alongside contributions by Anderson, and Lou Reed | Poetry | |
| "The Artist Searches etc. Water Log" | 2012 | Jim Shaw: The Rinse Cycle; With Robert Currie; edited by Laurence Sillars | Poetry | |
| "Flotage (Border)" | 2013 | Janet Werner: Another Perfect Day; Alongside contributions by David Balzer and John Kissick; edited by Meeka Walsh | Poetry | |
| "Good Dog I, II, III" | 2014 | Jürgen Partenheimer: Das Archiv – The Archive; In response to Partenheimer's "Kalliope I, II, III"; edited by the Bayerische Staatsgemäldesammlungen | Poetry | |
| "Bluish" | 2015 | The Blue of Distance; Alongside contributions by Rebecca Solnit and Courtenay Finn; edited by Sarah Stephenson | Poetry | |
| "Collaborating on Decreation: An Interview with Anne Carson" | 2015 | Anne Carson: Ecstatic Lyre; Interview with Peter Streckfus | Interview | |
| "Hack Gloss" | 2015 | Hack Wit by Roni Horn | Poetry | |
| "This Bird That Never Settles: A Virtual Conversation with Anne Carson about Greek Tragedy"; includes "Quicktime Prometheus" | 2015 | The Oxford Handbook of Greek Drama in the Americas; Interview with Yopie Prins; edited by Kathryn Bosher, Fiona Macintosh, Justine McConnell, and Patrice Rankine | Interview & Poetry | |
| "Sappho Drives Upstate (Fr. 2)" | 2015 | Freeman's: Arrival; Edited by John Freeman | Poetry | |
| "Suppose a Lone Man" | 2015 | John Skoog: Slow Return. Värn; Alongside contributions by Rainer Fuchs, Klaus Görner, Andréa Tavie Picard and Amalie Smith; edited by Susanne Gaensheimer and Karola Kraus | Poetry | |
| "Good Dog I, II, III" | 2015 | Jürgen Partenheimer: Calliope; Edited by Anne-Claire Schumacher | Poetry | |
| "Letter to Krito" | 2017 | Inside: Artists and Writers in Reading Prison; Edited by James Lingwood and Michael Morris | Poetry | |
| "Poverty Remix (Sestina)" | 2018 | Beggars by Andrea Büttner; Alongside contributions by Christopher P. Heuer and Linda Nochlin | Poetry | |
| "Part II: Handful of Dirt" | 2018 | Antigone Undone by Will Aitken; Juliette Binoche, Anne Carson and Ivo van Hove interview | Interview | |
| "Do Not Believe Your Thoughts Said Paisios of Mt Athos" | 2019 | The Great Tamer by Dimitris Papaioannou; With photographs by Julian Mommert | Poetry | |
| "Unofficial Transcripts of Notes Taken During the Q&A Following the Pig Lake Seminar (Ragnar Contra Nietzsche), April 2019, With Participants Bertolt Brecht, Simon Critchley, Geoff Dyer, Lev Nikolayevich Myshkin, Lou Salomé, Slavoj Žižek" | 2020 | Looking Writing Reading Looking: Writers on Art from the Louisiana Collection; In response to Me and My Mother by Ragnar Kjartansson; edited by Stephen Lund | Poetry | |
| "A Rustle of Catullus" | 2020 | Cy Twombly: Making Past Present; Alongside contributions by Jennifer R. Gross, Brooke Holmes, and Mary Jacobus; edited by Christine Kondoleon and Kate Nesin | Essay | |

=== Journals and literary magazines ===
| Title | Year | Publication | Type | Ref. |
|---|---|---|---|---|
| "Some Greeks: Fragments of Greek Papyri" | 1979 | Invisible City | Translation | |
| "Aphrodite and After" | 1980 | Phoenix | Scholarship | |
| "The Justice of Aphrodite in Sappho Fr. 1" | 1980 | Transactions of the American Philological Association | Scholarship | |
| "Wedding at Noon in Pindar’s Ninth Pythian" | 1982 | Greek, Roman, and Byzantine Studies | Scholarship | |
| "The Burners: A Reading of Bacchylides' Third Epinician Ode" | 1984 | Phoenix | Scholarship | |
| "Conversations with the Confused: Cold Feet" | 1985 | New Muses | Poetry | |
| "The Fall of Rome: A Traveller's Guide" | 1985 | Canadian Literature | Poetry | |
| "Three Poems" | 1986 | North Dakota Quarterly | Poetry | |
| "Echo with No Door on Her Mouth: A National Refraction Though Sophokles, Plato, and Defoe" | 1986 | Stanford Literature Review | Essay | |
| "Short Talks" | 1986 | Planetarium Station | Poetry | |
| "Short Talks" | 1987 | Bomb | Poetry | |
| "Short Talks" | 1987 | Southwest Review | Poetry | |
| "Kinds of Water" | 1987 | Grand Street | Poetry | |
| "Chez l'Oxymoron" | 1988 | Grand Street | Essay | |
| "A Dangerous Affair" | 1988 | The New York Times Book Review | Poetry | |
| "Simonides Negative" | 1988 | Arethusa | Essay | |
| "Review: The Nature of Early Greek Lyric: Three Preliminary Studies by R. L. Fowler" | 1989 | The Classical Journal | Review | |
| "The Life of Towns" | 1989 | Grand Street | Essay | |
| "Just for the Thrill: Sycophantizing Aristotle's Poetics" | 1990 | Arion: A Journal of Humanities and the Classics | Essay | |
| "Now What?" | 1990 | Grand Street | Translation & Poetry | |
| "Short Talks" | 1990 | The Yale Review | Poetry | |
| "Alphabetic Edge" | 1991 | The Canadian Bookbinders and Book Artists Guild Newsletter | Poetry | |
| "Short Talks" | 1991 | Descant | Poetry | |
| "Catullus: Carmina translated by Anne Carson" | 1992 | The American Poetry Review | Translation & Poetry | |
| "The Brainsex Paintings: Mimnermos (Translation, Essay, Interview)" | 1992 | Raritan | Poetry & Essay | |
| "How Not to Read a Poem: Unmixing Simonides from Protagoras" | 1992 | Classical Philology | Essay | |
| "Water Margins: An Essay on Swimming by My Brother" | 1992 | Descant | Poetry | |
| "The Truth About God: Seventeen Poems" | 1993 | The American Poetry Review | Poetry | |
| "Catullus: Carmina" | 1993 | Pearl | Translation & Poetry | |
| "Your Money or Your Life" | 1993 | Yale Journal of Criticism | Essay | |
| "Mimnermos: The Brainsex Paintings: A Translation of the Fragments of Mimnermos of Kolophon" | 1993 | Quarterly Review of Literature: Contemporary Poetry Series | Poetry & Essay | |
| "The Glass Essay" | 1994 | Raritan | Poetry | |
| "The Autobiography of Red" | 1994 | Columbia: A Magazine of Poetry & Prose | Poetry | |
| "The Fall of Rome: A Traveller's Guide" | 1994 | Pequod | Poetry | |
| "The Gender of Sound: Description, Definition and Mistrust of the Female Voice in Western Culture" | 1994 | Resources for Feminist Research | Essay | |
| "The Gender of Sound" | 1994 | Thamyris | Essay | |
| "Hero" | 1994 | Index: The Montreal Literary Calendar | Poetry | |
| "Red Meat: What Difference Did Stesichorus Make?" | 1995 | Raritan | Essay | |
| "Economy" | 1995 | Village Voice Literary Supplement | Poetry | |
| "Short Talk on Chromoluminism" | 1995 | The New York Times | Poetry | |
| "Shoes: An Essay on How Plato's Symposium Begins" | 1995 | The Iowa Review | Essay | |
| "TV Men: Hektor" | 1995 | Raritan | Poetry | |
| "The Truth About God: Six Poems" | 1996 | The American Poetry Review | Poetry | |
| "Simonides and the Art of Negative Attention" | 1996 | Brick: A Literary Journal | Essay | |
| "That Strength", "Methinks the Poor Town Has Been Troubled Too Long", "Visit" | 1996 | Parnassus | Poetry | |
| "Jaget" | 1996 | Chicago Review | Poetry | |
| "TV Men: Tolstoy" | 1996 | Raritan | Poetry | |
| "TV Men: Artaud" | 1996 | The Iowa Review | Poetry | |
| "Natures" | 1996 | Exquisite Corpse | Poetry | |
| "TV Men: Akhmatova (Treatment for a Script)" | 1996 | Colorado Review | Poetry | |
| "Writing on the World: Simonides, Exactitude and Paul Celan" | 1996 | Arion: A Journal of Humanities and the Classics | Essay | |
| "Anne Carson: The Matrix Interview" | 1996 | Matrix | Interview | |
| "Ice Blink" | 1997 | Raritan | Poetry | |
| "Gift", "Lines", "That Strength", "Would Be Her 50th Wedding Anniversary Today", "Methinks the Poor Town Has Been Troubled Too Long" | 1997 | Ambit Magazine | Poetry | |
| "Despite Her Pain, Another Day" | 1997 | The New Yorker | Poetry | |
| "Lines" | 1997 | The New Yorker | Poetry | |
| "TV Men: Antigone (Scripts 1 and 2)" | 1997 | The Paris Review | Poetry | |
| "Economy, Its Fragrance" | 1997 | The Threepenny Review | Essay | |
| "Artaud Script / Artaud Week" | 1997 | Trois | Poetry | |
| "TV Men: Lazarus" | 1997 | Parnassus | Poetry | |
| "Irony is Not Enough: Essay on My Life as Catherine Deneuve" | 1997 | Seneca Review | Poetry | |
| "Why Did I Wake Alone Among the Sleepers (Visibles and Invisibles in Simonides and Celan)" | 1997 | Seneca Review | Essay | |
| "A Symposium on Translation" | 1997 | The Threepenny Review | Essay | |
| "A ___ with Anne Carson" | 1997 | The Iowa Review | Interview | |
| "Chaldaic Oracles 1" | 1997 | The Iowa Review | Poetry | |
| "Shadowboxer" | 1997 | Chicago Review | Poetry | |
| "A Talk With Anne Carson" | 1997 | Brick: A Literary Journal | Interview | |
| "Ordinary Time: Virginia Woolf and Thucydides on War" | 1997 | Brick: A Literary Journal | Poetry | |
| "TV Men: Akhmatova (Treatment for a Script)" | 1997 | Colorado Review | Poetry | |
| "Father's Old Blue Cardigan" | 1997 | The New Yorker | Poetry | |
| "New Rule" | 1997 | The New Yorker | Poetry | |
| "Handbook for William (Liber Manualis) by Dhuoda, translated by Carol Neel" | 1998 | Brick: A Literary Journal | Review | |
| "Strange Hour (Outcast Hour)" | 1998 | The Threepenny Review | Poetry | |
| "All Debts Owed to Death: Economy in Simonides and Celan" | 1998 | Parnassus | Essay | |
| "Hopper: Confessions" | 1998 | Raritan | Poetry | |
| "Ordinary Time: Virginia Woolf and Thucydides on War" | 1998 | Fence | Poetry | |
| "Semaine d'Artaud" | 1998 | Conjunctions | Poetry | |
| "TV Men: Lenz in China" | 1998 | Descant | Poetry | |
| "No Port Now" | 1998 | The New Republic | Poetry | |
| "TV Men: Thucydides in Conversation with Virginia Woolf on the Set of The Peloponnesian War" | 1998 | The Threepenny Review | Poetry | |
| "Helen" | 1998 | Boston Review | Poetry | |
| "Victory Must Be Supremely Glorious Experience; Said a Woman to the Duke of Wellington" | 1998 | Boston Review | Poetry | |
| "False Sail" | 1998 | The Threepenny Review | Poetry | |
| "Old Home" | 1998 | Metre | Poetry | |
| "And Kneeling at the Edge of the Transparent Sea; I Shall Shape for Myself a New Heart from Salt and Mud" | 1998 | The New Yorker | Poetry | |
| "Essay on What I Think About the Most" "Essay on Error (2nd Draft)" | 1999 | Raritan | Poetry | |
| "Economy, Its Fragrance" | 1999 | Brick: A Literary Review | Poetry | |
| "Longing, a Documentary" | 1999 | Brick: A Literary Review | Poetry | |
| "Oedipus' Nap" | 1999 | The Threepenny Review | Poetry | |
| "TV Men: Akhmatova (Treatment for a Script)" | 1999 | PN Review | Poetry | |
| "The Idea of a University (after John Henry Newman)" | 1999 | The Threepenny Review | Essay | |
| "Her Beckett" | 1999 | The Paris Review | Poetry | |
| "Nothing For It" | 1999 | The Paris Review | Poetry | |
| "My Show" | 1999 | The Paris Review | Poetry | |
| "Betty Goodwin Seated Figure with Red Angle" | 1999 | Artforum | Poetry | |
| "Interview with Anne Carson" | 1999 | Satellite | Interview | |
| "PWInterview: Anne Carson" | 2000 | Publishers Weekly | Interview | |
| "Longing, a Documentary: Shot List" | 2000 | The Threepenny Review | Poetry | |
| "Four Poems from 'The Beauty of the Husband'" | 2000 | London Review of Books | Poetry | |
| "Fragment 96 LP" | 2000 | Jubilat | Translation | |
| "Dhuoda's Mirror" | 2000 | The Threepenny Review | Review | |
| "Decreation: An Opera in Three Parts" | 2000 | Parnassus | Poetry | |
| "Simonides and the Art of Negative Attention" | 2000 | Brick: A Literary Review | Essay | |
| "Fragment 98a, 98b" | 2000 | The Globe and Mail | Translation | |
| "Bindings" | 2000 | Satellite | Poetry | |
| "from Decreation: An Opera in Three Parts" | 2000 | Fence | Poetry | |
| "Heloise and Abelard: A Screenplay in 11 Scenes" | 2001 | Black Warrior Review | Poetry | |
| "Guillermo's Sigh Symphony" | 2001 | New Delta Review | Poetry | |
| "Longing, a Visual Primer" | 2001 | Art on Paper | Poetry | |
| "TV Men: Beckett" | 2001 | The Threepenny Review | Poetry | |
| "Opposed Glimpse of Alice James, Garth James, Henry James, Robertson James and William James" | 2001 | The Threepenny Review | Poetry | |
| "from Sleep Plan" | 2001 | Brick: A Literary Review | Poetry | |
| "Frusta: Houseman, Sappho, Stoppard and the Uses of Cold Water" | 2001 | Lincoln Center Theater Review | Poetry | |
| "Foam (Essay on Rhapsody): On the Sublime in Longinus and Antonioni" | 2001 | Conjunctions | Poetry | |
| "Foam (Essay on Rhapsody): On the Sublime in Longinus and Antonioni", "The Day Antonioni Came to the Asylum" | 2001 | Brick: A Literary Review | Poetry | |
| "When Words Don't Fail" | 2001 | Artforum | Poetry | |
| "Beauty Prefers an Edge" | 2001 | Poets and Writers | Interview | |
| "Stanzas, Sexes, Seductions" | 2001 | The New Yorker | Poetry | |
| "Woman of Letters" | 2001 | Canadian Writer’s Yearbook | Interview | |
| "High Class(ical), An Interview with Poet and Classicist Anne Carson" | 2001 | Satellite | Interview | |
| "Decreation: How Women Like Sappho, Marguerite Porete, and Simone Weil Tell God" | 2002 | Common Knowledge | Poetry | |
| "Opposed Glimpse" | 2002 | Harper's Magazine | Poetry | |
| "Guillermo's Sigh Symphony" | 2002 | London Review of Books | Poetry | |
| "The Mirror of Simple Souls: An Opera Installation Libretto" | 2002 | The Kenyon Review | Poetry | |
| "And Reason Remains Undaunted" | 2002 | The Threepenny Review | Poetry | |
| "Ode to the Sublime Monica Vitti" | 2002 | London Review of Books | Poetry | |
| "Outwardly His Life Ran Smoothly", "Longinus' Dream of Antonioni" | 2002 | Raritan | Poetry | |
| "Swimming in Circles in Copenhagen: A Sonnet Sequence for Peter, Martin & Pejk" | 2002 | Five Fingers Review | Poetry | |
| "Swimming Circles in Copenhagen: A Sonnet Sequence", "Spring Break: Swallow Song" | 2002 | London Review of Books | Poetry | |
| "Euripides to the Audience*" | 2002 | London Review of Books | Poetry | |
| "Kant's Question About Monica Vitti" | 2002 | London Review of Books | Poetry | |
| "Ice-Pleasure" | 2002 | Canadian Journal of Psychoanalysis | Poetry | |
| "TV Men: Tolstoy" | 2002 | Tolstoy Studies Journal | Poetry | |
| "Blended Text" | 2002 | Fence | Poetry | |
| "Detail from the Tomb of the Diver" | 2003 | The Believer | Poetry | |
| "Gnosticism-I" | 2003 | The New Yorker | Poetry | |
| "Guillermo's Sigh Symphony" | 2003 | Canadian Literature | Poetry | |
| "Gifts and Questions: An Interview with Anne Carson" | 2003 | Canadian Literature | Interview | |
| "Swimming at Noon Always Reminds Me of Marilyn Monroe – Etruscan Saying" | 2003 | Convivium | Poetry | |
| "Stanzas, Sexes, Seductions" | 2003 | Canadian Literature | Poetry | |
| "Beckett's Theory of Tragedy", "Beckett's Theory of Comedy" | 2003 | London Review of Books | Poetry | |
| "The Mirror of Simple Souls: An Opera Installation" | 2003 | Ruminator Review | Poetry | |
| "Totality: The Color of Eclipse" | 2003 | Cabinet | Poetry | |
| "How to Like 'If I Told Him A Completed Portrait of Picasso' by Gertrude Stein" | 2004 | The Threepenny Review | Essay | |
| "Decreation: An Excerpt from an Opera in Three Parts" | 2004 | Landfall | Poetry | |
| "Every Exit Is an Entrance (A Praise of Sleep)" | 2004 | Prairie Fire | Essay | |
| "Lots of Guns (An Oratorio for [4] Voices)" | 2004 | Gulf Coast | Poetry | |
| "Anne Carson, The Art of Poetry No. 88" | 2004 | The Paris Review | Interview | |
| "The Day Antonioni Came to the Asylum (Rhapsody)" | 2004 | The Paris Review | Poetry | |
| "Detail from the Tomb of the Diver (Paestum 500-543 B.C.) Second Detail" | 2004 | Decipherment of Linear X | Poetry | |
| "Water, Still" | 2004 | Prairie Fire | Poetry | |
| "On Discovering at Dinner that Adam Zagajewski and I Share a Birthday" | 2005 | London Review of Books | Poetry | |
| "Two Translations of Aeschylus' 'Agamemnon' 1072-1330" | 2005 | London Review of Books | Translation | |
| "The Beat Goes On" | 2005 | The New York Review of Books | Translation | |
| "Zeus Bits" | 2005 | London Review of Books | Poetry | |
| "Shot List" | 2005 | Michigan Quarterly Review | Poetry | |
| "On Evil and Suffering in Modern Poetry" | 2006 | The Threepenny Review | Essay | |
| "Grasscolored: A Threat Documentary" | 2006 | Subtropics | Poetry | |
| "Zeus Bits" | 2006 | Harper's Magazine | Poetry | |
| "Beuyskreuz" | 2006 | Conjunctions | Poetry | |
| "Two Poems by Emile Nelligan" | 2006 | London Review of Books | Translation | |
| "Walks for Boys and Girls" | 2006 | London Review of Books | Poetry | |
| "Hekabe" | 2006 | The American Poetry Review | Translation & Preface | |
| "Epilogos, from It" | 2006 | The American Poetry Review | Poetry & Preface | |
| "O Ister" | 2006 | The New York Review of Books | Poetry | |
| "Alive That Time" | 2007 | London Review of Books | Poetry | |
| "More Zeus Bits" | 2007 | Bomb | Poetry | |
| "Triple Sonnet of the Plush Pony" | 2007 | London Review of Books | Poetry | |
| "Émile Nelligan: 'Crows,' 'Funeral Marches,' 'Hospital Night Dream,' & 'Night Confession'" | 2007 | Gulf Coast | Translation | |
| "Deer (Not a Play)" | 2007 | London Review of Books | Poetry | |
| "Excerpt from An Oresteia" | 2008 | Tin House | Translation | |
| "Short Talk on Someone Coming Out of a Tomb Laughing" | 2008 | Reading Between A&B | Poetry | |
| "Necks" | 2008 | The New York Review of Books | Poetry | |
| "Variations on the Right to Remain Silent" | 2008 | A Public Space | Essay | |
| "Tag" | 2008 | The New Yorker | Poetry | |
| "Twelve-Minute Prometheus (After Aiskhylos)" | 2008 | London Review of Books | Poetry | |
| "Contempts" | 2009 | Arion: A Journal of Humanities and the Classics | Essay | |
| "Burners Go Raw" | 2009 | London Review of Books | Poetry | |
| "Finally April and the Birds Are Falling Out of the Air with Joy" | 2009 | Boston Review | Poetry | |
| "Life of Spinoza" | 2009 | Chicago Review | Poetry | |
| "Wildly Constant" | 2009 | London Review of Books | Poetry | |
| "Epithalamium NYC" | 2009 | The New Yorker | Poetry | |
| "Peril" | 2009 | The Threepenny Review | Poetry | |
| "Wildly Constant" | 2009 | The Oleander Review | Poetry | |
| "Good Dog" | 2010 | London Review of Books | Poetry | |
| "Hang It Up" | 2010 | Granta | Poetry | |
| "Instructions for Folding" | 2010 | Paperbag | Poetry | |
| "Who Were You" | 2010 | PEN America: A Journal for Writers and Readers | Poetry | |
| "Prometheus Bound: An Excerpt from the Play by Aischylos" | 2010 | The Wolf | Poetry | |
| "The 'Ode to Man' from Sophocles' Antigone" | 2010 | The New Yorker | Poetry | |
| "Sonnet of Addressing Gertrude Stein", "Drop't Sonnet" | 2010 | London Review of Books | Poetry | |
| "Sonnet Isolate" | 2010 | London Review of Books | Poetry | |
| "[Wife of Brain]" | 2010 | The Awl | Poetry | |
| "[3 Fragments of Mimnermos]" | 2010 | The Nation | Translation | |
| "Epitaph for Ben Sonnenberg" | 2010 | The Nation | Poetry | |
| "Letters: By Our Readers and Anne Carson" | 2010 | The Nation | Letter | |
| "Powerless Structures Fig. 11 (Sanne)" | 2011 | Poetry Review | Poetry | |
| "Merce Sonnet", "Sonnet of the English-Made Cabinet with Drawers (in Prose)" | 2011 | London Review of Books | Poetry | |
| "Sonnet of Exemplary Sentences From the Chapter Pertaining to the Nature of Pronouns in Emile Beneviste's Problems in General Linguistics (Paris 1966)" | 2011 | The Nation | Poetry | |
| "O Dad" | 2011 | The New Yorker | Poetry | |
| "Ghost Q & A" | 2011 | A Public Space | Poetry | |
| "Candor" | 2011 | Bomb | Poetry | |
| "Glove" | 2011 | London Review of Books | Poetry | |
| "O Hap" | 2011 | The Threepenny Review | Essay | |
| "Powerless Structures Fig. 11 (Sanne)" | 2012 | The New Republic | Poetry | |
| "No One Could Relax around Jezebel" | 2012 | London Review of Books | Poetry | |
| "We Point the Bone: An Essay on Threat" | 2012 | Tin House | Essay | |
| "An Interview with Anne Carson" | 2012 | Brick: A Literary Journal | Interview | |
| "A Fragment of Ibykos Translated Six Ways" | 2012 | London Review of Books | Translation | |
| "Red Excerpts" | 2013 | Harper's Magazine | Poetry | |
| "Song of Your Pluck" | 2013 | The American Reader | Poetry | |
| "Two Poems from Red Doc>" | 2013 | PEN Poetry Series | Poetry | |
| "Eras of Yves Klein" | 2013 | The New Republic | Poetry | |
| "Bakxai 370-432" | 2013 | Michigan Quarterly Review | Translation | |
| "Maintenance" | 2013 | Denver Quarterly | Poetry | |
| "Krapp Interviews the Glass Technician" | 2013 | Boston Review | Poetry | |
| "Short Talk on Herbology" | 2013 | The New Yorker | Poetry | |
| "By Chance the Cycladic People" | 2013 | London Review of Books | Poetry | |
| "108 (Flotage)" | 2013 | Washington Square Review | Poetry | |
| "Short Talk on the Withness of the Body" | 2013 | The New Republic | Poetry | |
| "The Designated Mourner by Wally Shawn, Final Production, NYC, June 2013" | 2013 | London Review of Books | Poetry | |
| "Merry Christmas from Hegel" | 2014 | Gulf Coast | Poetry | |
| "Onions" | 2014 | The Threepenny Review | Poetry | |
| "Ancient Words, Modern Words: A Conversation with Anne Carson" | 2014 | World Literature Today | Interview | |
| "Pronoun Envy" | 2014 | The New Yorker | Poetry | |
| "108 (Flotage)" | 2014 | Fence | Poetry | |
| "Krapp Hour" | 2014 | Granta | Poetry | |
| "The Albertine Workout" | 2014 | London Review of Books | Poetry | |
| "Krapp Hour (Act 2)" | 2015 | Granta | Poetry | |
| "A Rehearsal for Life" | 2015 | The Times Literary Supplement | Poetry | |
| "Linnaeus Town" | 2015 | Boston Review | Poetry | |
| "Each Day Unexpected Salvation (John Cage)" | 2015 | The New Yorker | Poetry | |
| "Dave's, Lake Michigan, Early June" | 2015 | London Review of Books | Poetry | |
| "Five Questions with Anne Carson" | 2015 | Washington Square Review | Interview | |
| "Uncle Harry: A Lyric Lecture with Chorus" | 2015 | The White Review | Poetry | |
| "Salon" | 2015 | The Paris Review | Poetry | |
| "Little Racket" | 2015 | The New Yorker | Poetry | |
| "We've Only Just Begun" | 2016 | Harper's Magazine | Short story | |
| "1 = 1" | 2016 | The New Yorker | Short story | |
| "What to Say of the Entirety" | 2016 | The New York Review of Books | Poetry | |
| "Back the Way You Went" | 2016 | The New Yorker | Short story | |
| "Tom and TV" | 2016 | London Review of Books | Poetry | |
| "Laps for Fat Wal" | 2016 | The New York Review of Books | Poetry | |
| "Fate, Federal Court, Moon" | 2017 | London Review of Books | Poetry | |
| "Saturday Night as an Adult" | 2017 | The New Yorker | Poetry | |
| "Stacks" | 2017 | PAJ: A Journal of Performance and Art | Poetry | |
| "Interview with Anne Carson" | 2017 | The White Review | Interview | |
| "Eddy" | 2017 | The Paris Review | Poetry | |
| "Clive Song" | 2017 | The New Yorker | Poetry | |
| "God Among Men" | 2017 | Harper's Magazine | Translation | |
| "Short Talk on My Headache" | 2018 | London Review of Books | Poetry | |
| "The Persians" | 2018 | The Fabulist | Translation | |
| "Flaubert Again" | 2018 | The New Yorker | Short story | |
| "Ardor (Aghast)" | 2018 | Granta | Poetry | |
| "War Song" | 2018 | The New York Review of Books | Poetry | |
| "Short Talk on Homer and John Ashbery" | 2018 | The New Yorker | Poetry | |
| "Nostos" | 2019 | Harper's Magazine | Poetry | |
| "On Davey" | 2019 | London Review of Books | Poetry | |
| "Fox" | 2019 | Harper's Magazine | Poetry | |
| "The Keats Headaches" | 2019 | The Times Literary Supplement | Poetry | |
| "First Choral Ode from Norma Jeane Baker of Troy (A Translation of Euripides’ Helen)" | 2019 | London Review of Books | Poetry | |
| "An Evening With Joseph Conrad" | 2019 | The New Yorker | Flash fiction | |
| "Ich bin doch kein Centrefold" | 2019 | The Times Literary Supplement | Poetry | |
| "Final Choral Ode from Norma Jeane Baker of Troy (A Translation of Euripides’ Helen)" | 2019 | London Review of Books | Poetry | |
| "Visitors Rev. 4" | 2019 | Granta | Poetry | |
| "Troys and Girls" | 2020 | Harper's Magazine | Poetry | |
| "1 x 30" | 2020 | London Review of Books | Poetry | |
| "Lark" | 2020 | London Review of Books | Poetry | |
| "Short Talk on Kafka on Hölderlin" | 2020 | The New York Review of Books | Poetry | |
| "The Sheer Velocity and Ephemerality of Cy Twombly"; Includes translations of Catullus 101 | 2020 | Literary Hub | Essay & Translation | |
| "Oh What A Night (Alkibiades)" | 2020 | London Review of Books | Poetry | |
| "Sure, I Was Loved"; For Dimitris Papaioannou | 2021 | The Times Literary Supplement | Poetry | |
| "Life" | 2021 | The New Yorker | Poetry | |
| "Four Talks" | 2022 | London Review of Books | Poetry | |
| "Keeping Quiet: A Brief Interview with Anne Carson" | 2022 | The Collidescope | Interview | |
| "On Snow" | 2022 | London Review of Books | Poetry | |
| "What I Like about You, Baby" | 2022 | London Review of Books | Poetry | |
| "Poor Houdini" | 2024 | The New Yorker | Short story | |

=== Anthologies and collections ===
| Publication | Year | Contribution(s) | Ref. |
|---|---|---|---|
| The Best American Essays 1988; Guest edited by Annie Dillard | 1988 | "Kinds of Water" | |
| Performance and Reality: Essays from Grand Street; Edited by Ben Sonnenberg | 1989 | "Chez l'Oxymoron" | |
| The Best American Poetry 1990; Guest edited by Jorie Graham | 1990 | "The Life of Towns" | |
| The Best American Essays 1992; Guest edited by Susan Sontag | 1992 | "Short Talks" | |
| The Journey Prize Anthology 6: Short Fiction from the Best of Canada's New Writers; Edited by Douglas Glover | 1993 | "Water Margins: An Essay on Swimming by My Brother" | |
| Paper Guitar: 27 Writers Celebrate 25 Years of Descant Magazine; Edited by Karen Mulhallen | 1995 | "The Fall of Rome: A Traveller's Guide" | |
| Wild Workshop: Three Poems; Anne Carson, Kay Adshead, Bridget Meeds | 1997 | "The Glass Essay" | |
| Writing Home: A PEN Canada Anthology; Edited by Constance Rooke | 1997 | "No Port Now" | |
| The Pushcart Prize XXII: Best of the Small Presses; Edited by Bill Henderson | 1997 | "Jaget" | |
| The Best of the Best American Poetry 1988-1997; Guest edited by Harold Bloom | 1998 | "The Life of Towns" | |
| The Best American Poetry 1998; Guest edited by John Hollander | 1998 | "TV Men: Antigone (Scripts 1 and 2)" | |
| The Forward Book of Poetry 1999; Edited by Geordie Greig | 1998 | Selections from Glass and God | |
| In Brief: Short Takes on the Personal; Edited by Judith Kitchen and Mary Paumier Jones | 1999 | "Very Narrow" | |
| The Oxford Book of Stories by Canadian Women in English; Edited by Rosemary Sullivan | 1999 | Selections from "The Anthropology of Water" | |
| The Griffin Poetry Prize Anthology: A Selection of the 2001 Shortlist; Edited by Esta Spalding | 2001 | Selections from Men in the Off Hours | |
| The Best American Poetry 2001; Guest edited by Robert Hass | 2001 | "Longing, a Documentary" | |
| 15 Canadian Poets X 3 Edited by Gary Geddes | 2001 | "The Glass Essay" | |
| The New Long Poem Anthology; Edited by Sharon Thesen | 2001 | "The Glass Essay" | |
| The Matrix Interviews – Moosehead Anthology Issue 8 Edited by R. E. N. Allen and Angela Carr | 2001 | Carson interview with Mary di Michele | |
| The Best American Poetry 2002; Guest edited by Robert Creeley | 2002 | "Opposed Glimpse of Alice James, Garth James, Henry James, Robertson James and William James" | |
| The Norton Anthology of Modern and Contemporary Poetry; Edited by Jahan Ramazani and Richard Ellman | 2003 | "The Glass Essay", "XI ('TV is presocial, like Man.')" from "TV Men", "Epitaph: Zion", "Lazarus Standup: Shooting Script", and "Stanzas, Sexes, Seductions" | |
| The Next American Essay; Edited by John D'Agata | 2003 | "Kinds of Water" | |
| Great American Prose Poems: From Poe to the Present; Edited by David Lehman | 2003 | "Short Talks" ("On Waterproofing", "On Orchids", "On Hedonism", "On Shelter") | |
| The Anchor Book of New American Short Stories; Edited by Ben Marcus | 2004 | "Short Talks" | |
| The Best American Poetry 2004; Guest edited by Lyn Hejinian | 2004 | "Gnosticism" | |
| The Norton Anthology of Poetry; Edited by Margaret Ferguson, Mary Jo Salter, and Jon Stallworthy | 2005 | "New Rule" and "Sumptuous Destitution" from Men in the Off Hours; "He She We They You…" from The Beauty of the Husband | |
| The Norton Anthology of English Literature; Edited by Stephen Greenblatt et al. | 2006 | "Hero" from "The Glass Essay" | |
| The Norton Anthology of Literature by Women; Edited by Sandra Gilbert and Susan Gubar | 2007 | Extract from "The Glass Essay, and "Lazarus Standup: Shooting Script" | |
| Touchstone Anthology of Contemporary Creative Nonfiction: Work from 1970 to the Present; Edited by Lex Williford and Michael Martone | 2007 | "The Glass Essay" | |
| The Greek Poets: Homer to the Present; Edited by Peter Constantine, Rachel Hadas, Edmund Keeley, and Karen Van Dyck | 2010 | Selections from If Not, Winter: Fragments of Sappho | |
| Modern Canadian Poets: An Anthology; Edited by Todd Swift and Evan Jones | 2010 | "Essay on What I Think About Most", "Father’s Old Blue Cardigan", "Funeral Marches", and "Night Confession" | |
| Ways of Reading: An Anthology for Writers; Edited by David Bartholomae and Tony Petrosky | 2011 | "Short Talks" | |
| Fathers: A Literary Anthology; Edited by André Gérard | 2011 | "Father's Old Blue Cardigan" | |
| The Best American Poetry 2012; Guest edited by Mark Doty | 2012 | "Sonnet of Exemplary Sentences From the Chapter Pertaining to the Nature of Pronouns in Emile Beneviste's Problems in General Linguistics (Paris 1966)" | |
| Greek Tragedies II; Edited by David Grene and Richmond Lattimore; third edition edited by Mark Griffith and Glenn W. Most | 2013 | "Iphigenia among the Taurians" | |
| The Complete Greek Tragedies: Euripides III; Edited by David Grene and Richmond Lattimore; third edition edited by Mark Griffith and Glenn W. Most | 2013 | "Iphigenia among the Taurians" | |
| The Griffin Poetry Prize Anthology 2014; Edited by Robert Bringhurst | 2014 | Selections from Red Doc> | |
| The Best American Poetry 2014; Guest edited by Terrance Hayes | 2014 | "A Fragment of Ibykos Translated Six Ways" | |
| Short: An International Anthology of Five Centuries of Short-short Stories, Prose Poems, Brief Essays, and Other Short Prose Forms; Edited by Alan Ziegler | 2014 | "Short Talk on Sleep Stones" | |
| Imaginarium 3: The Best Canadian Speculative Writing; Edited by Sandra Kasturi and Helen Marshall | 2015 | "Wife of Brain" from Red Doc> | |
| Modern Poets One: If I'm Scared We Can't Win; Emily Berry, Anne Carson, Sophie Collins | 2016 | Selections from Plainwater, Autobiography of Red, Men in the Off Hours, The Beauty of the Husband, Decreation, Red Doc>, and Float | |
| Measures of Astonishment: Poets on Poetry; Presented by the League of Canadian Poets | 2016 | Every Exit is an Entrance (A Praise of Sleep); Lecture presented as part of the Anne Szumigalski lecture series (2004) | |
| The White Review Anthology; Edited by Ben Eastham and Jacques Testard | 2017 | "Uncle Harry" | |
| The Serving Library Annual 2017-2018; Edited by Francesca and Stuart Bertolotti-Bailey, Angie Keefer et al. | 2017 | "Nell" | |
| The Norton Anthology of Poetry; Edited by Margaret Ferguson, Tim Kendall, and Mary Jo Salter | 2018 | "New Rule" and "Sumptuous Destitution" from Men in the Off Hours; "Lines" and "Some Afternoons She Does Not Pick Up the Phone" from Decreation | |
| The Penguin Book of the Prose Poem: From Baudelaire to Anne Carson; Edited by Jeremy Noel-Tod | 2018 | "Merry Christmas from Hegel", and selections from Short Talks | |

== Major sources ==
- Meyer, Paul (2016). She] ⟨Ha?⟩ She (PDF). Toronto: University of Toronto. [Doctoral thesis]
- Rae, Ian (September–December 2011). "Verglas: Narrative Technique in Anne Carson's 'The Glass Essay'". ESC: English Studies in Canada. 37 (3–4): 163–186. doi:10.1353/esc.2011.0054. ISSN 1913-4835. S2CID 162188548.
- Wilkinson, Joshua Marie, ed. (2015). Anne Carson: Ecstatic Lyre. Ann Arbor: University of Michigan Press. ISBN 978-0-472-05253-0.
- Willard, Thomas (2011). "Anne Carson". In Canfield Reisman, Rosemary M. (ed.). Critical Survey of Poetry: British, Irish and Commonwealth Poets. Pasadena, California: Salem Press. pp. 225–228. ISBN 9781587657559.
