= If Not, Winter =

2002 translation of Sappho by Anne Carson

If Not, Winter: Fragments of Sappho is a book by the Canadian classicist and poet Anne Carson, first published in 2002. It contains a translation of the surviving works of the archaic Greek poet Sappho, with the Greek text on facing pages, based on Eva-Maria Voigt's 1971 critical edition. Carson's translation closely follows the word order of Sappho's Greek, and marks lacunae in the manuscripts with square brackets. If Not, Winter was widely praised and is considered a significant modern translation of Sappho's work.

== Translation ==
]
]work
]face
]
]
if not, winter
]no pain
]
]I bid you sing
of Gongyla, Abanthis, taking up
your lyre as (now again) longing
floats around you,

you beauty. For her dress when you saw it
stirred you. And I rejoice.
In fact she herself once blamed me
Kyprogeneia

because I prayed
this word:
I want

— Anne Carson,
Sappho 22 Voigt
If Not, Winter

If Not, Winter is a translation of the poetry of Sappho by the poet, classicist, and translator Anne Carson, known for her works based on ancient Greek literature. It was first published by Alfred A. Knopf in 2002. The Folio Society produced an edition in 2019 illustrated by Jenny Holzer. The title comes from Carson's translation of Sappho's fragment 22.

If Not, Winter uses the Greek text of Eva-Maria Voigt's Sappho and Alcaeus with a few variations. Along with Carson's translations, with Greek text on facing pages, the book has a short introduction, notes on the translation, a "who's who" of names in Sappho's poetry, and translations of selected ancient writings about Sappho.

Carson's translations and notes draw on her previous work Eros the Bittersweet. She attempts to follow the word order of the Greek text as closely as possible, and not to add any words which cannot be found in the surviving Greek texts of Sappho, such as personal pronouns and definite articles. She uses square brackets in her translations to indicate lacunae in the original text, which she describes as "an aesthetic gesture toward the papyrological event"; she also makes use of white space, breaking up some fragments over multiple lines.

== Reception ==
If Not, Winter was praised by reviewers for its translations. Dimitrios Yatromanolakis described Carson's translations as being of "remarkable accuracy and subtleness". Both Emily Greenwood and Meryl Altman admired the translation for its minimalism; Greenwood describing it as "elegantly plain" and Altman as "spare and elegant". Margaret Reynolds called the translations "subtle, beautiful, precise, moving". Elizabeth Robinson described Carson's translations of Sappho's poems "small miracles of vividness". The poet and translator Bruce Whiteman was more critical, saying that though Carson is "a great poet (at times) and an accomplished classicist", her translations of Sappho "sound more like trots than fully achieved poems". Carson's plain language and faithfulness to the surviving Greek fragments was noted by reviewers for being distinct from her other treatments of ancient Greek fragments, such as her reworking of Stesichorus's Geryoneis as Autobiography of Red.

Some reviewers questioned how accessible If Not, Winter was for lay readers. Though she considered it "ideal" for readers with some familiarity with ancient Greek, Altman suggested that the book might be "frustrating" to those without. However, Emily Wilson praised Carson's notes, saying that they "should enable even the Greekless reader to understand some of the most important textual problems in Sappho". Writing for the Los Angeles Times, Jamie James likewise praised Carson's notes, though criticised her introduction as "the weakest part of the book", particularly Carson's discussion of Sappho's sexuality.

If Not, Winter was considered a significant translation of Sappho on its publication: Yatromanolakis called it "perhaps the most significant" recent (as of 2004) English translation of Sappho. Carol Moldaw judged it the first to supersede Mary Barnard's 1958 Sappho: A New Translation. In the 2021 Cambridge Companion to Sappho, Barbara Goff and Katherine Harloe judge it "a defining translation" of the post-1980 era. It has itself been translated into Spanish, published as the trilingual Greek/English/Spanish Si no, el invierno: Fragmentos de Safo.

== Works cited ==
- Altman, Meryl (2004). "Looking for Sappho". The Women's Review of Books. 21 (4). doi:10.2307/4024368. JSTOR 4024286.
- Coles, Elizabeth Sarah (2023). Anne Carson: The Glass Essayist. New York: Oxford University Press. ISBN 9780197680919.
- Goff, Barbara; Harloe, Katherine (2021). "Sappho in the 20th Century and Beyond". In Finglass, P. J.; Kelly, Adrian (eds.). The Cambridge Companion to Sappho. Cambridge: Cambridge University Press. ISBN 978-1-316-63877-4.
- Greenwood, Emily (2005). "Review of Anne Carson, If Not, Winter". Journal of Hellenic Studies. 125. JSTOR 30033357.
- James, Jamie (25 August 2002). "The Enigma of Sappho". Los Angeles Times.
- Jansen, Laura (2019). "The Gift of Residue". In Jansen, Laura (ed.). Anne Carson: Antiquity. Bloomsbury Academic.
- Moldaw, Carol (2003). "Review of Anne Carson, If Not, Winter". The Antioch Review. 61 (2). doi:10.2307/4614495. JSTOR 4614495.
- Reynolds, Margaret (15 November 2003). "In Praise of Fleeting Pleasures". The Times: Weekend Review.
- Robinson, Elizabeth (2015). "An Antipoem that Condenses Everything: Anne Carson's Translations of the Fragments of Sappho". In Wilkinson, Joshua M. (ed.). Anne Carson: Ecstatic Lyre. Ann Arbor: University of Michigan Press. ISBN 9780472120901.
- Wilson, Emily (8 January 2004). "Tongue Breaks". London Review of Books. 26 (1).
- Whiteman, Bruce (2014). "Sappho; or, On Loss". The Hudson Review.
- Yatromanolakis, Dimitrios (2004). "Fragments, Brackets, and Poetics: On Anne Carson's If Not, Winter". International Journal of the Classical Tradition. 11 (2): 266–272. doi:10.1007/BF02720036. JSTOR 30221969. S2CID 159932497.
