= Bridge Crossing =

Bridge Crossing may refer to:

- "Bridge Crossing" (Battle for Dream Island), a 2010 web series episode
- Ferry Point Bridge Crossing, a crossing connecting Maine and New Brunswick on the Canada–US border
- Selma Bridge Crossing Jubilee, an annual march commemorating the Selma to Montgomery marches

== See also ==
- Bridge (disambiguation)
- Crossing (disambiguation)
- Border Crossing (disambiguation)
- Crossing the Bridge, a 1992 American drama film
- Crossing the Bridge: The Sound of Istanbul, a 2005 documentary film about Turkish music
