= Crossing the Border (short story collection) =

Collection of short stories

- First edition
- Author: Joyce Carol Oates
- Cover artist: Elizabeth Woll
- Language: English
- Publisher: Vanguard Press
- Publication date: 1976
- Publication place: United States, Canada
- Media type: Print (hardback)
- Pages: 256 pp (first edition, hardback)
- ISBN: 0-8149-0774-1 (first edition, hardback)
- Preceded by: The Seduction and Other Stories (1975)
- Followed by: Night-Side (1977)

Crossing the Border: Fifteen Tales is a collection of short stories by Joyce Carol Oates written while the author was residing in Canada (1968–1978). Published simultaneously by Vanguard Press in the United States and by Cage Publishing Company, Agincourt, Canada in 1976. The stories had appeared previously (1974–1976) in different US and Canadian magazines, often in different versions. Seven of the stories, "Crossing the Border", "Hello Fine Day Isn't It", "Natural Boundaries", "Customs", "The Scream", "An Incident in The Park", and "River Rising" depict conjugal life of an American couple, Reneé and Evan Maynard, in Canada. The characters in "The Transformation of Vincent Scoville" and "The Liberation of Jake Hanley" are instructors at the same Canadian college. The rest of the stories are not connected to each other.

== Stories ==
Those stories first appearing in literary journals are indicated.

- "Crossing the Border" (New York Times Magazine, December 1, 1974)
- "Love. Friendship" (Chatelaine, January 1975)
- "Hello Fine Day Isn't It" (The Malahat Review, April 1976)
- "Through the Looking Glass" (The Malahat Review, July 1970)
- "Natural Boundaries" (Family Circle, August 1974)
- "Dreams" (Prairie Schooner, Winter 1969–70)
- "Customs" (The Fiddlehead, Summer 1974)
- "The Transformation of Vincent Scoville" (Canadian Fiction Magazine, Autumn 1974)
- "The Golden Madonna" (Playboy, March 1974)
- "The Scream" (Michigan Quarterly Review, Spring 1975)
- "The Liberation of Jake Hanley" (Queen's Quarterly, Spring 1975)
- "An Incident in The Park"
- "Falling in Love in Ashton, British Columbia" (Epoch, Spring 1975)
- "The Tempter" (Fiction, 1975)
- "River Rising" (Chatelaine, May 1976)

== Critical appraisal ==
The collection has drawn critical attention. Anne Tyler observes, '... Crossing the Border revolves around borders, ... but the borders, ... are only nominally geographical. Although most of the stories concern Americans in Canada ― people whose private sense of disengagement is intensified by their life in a culture half foreign, half familiar ― the real borders are personal: the boundaries by which each individual defines himself and, rightly or wrongly, fends off other individuals.' But of course these personal boundaries also have to be "crossed", transcended, and therefore the stories are also concerned with transitions of the psychic boundaries which characterize the individual, with the development from one level of consciousness to another one.

== Sources ==
- Johnson, Greg. 1994. Joyce Carol Oates: A Study of the Short Fiction. Twayne's studies in short fiction; no. 57. Twayne Publishers, New York. ISBN 0-8057-0857-X\.y
- Johnson, Greg. 1987. Understanding Joyce Carol Oates. University of South Carolina Press, Columbia, South Carolina. ISBN 0-87249-524-8
- Oates, Joyce Carol. 1976. Crossing the Border. Vanguard Press, New York. ISBN 0-8149-0774-1
- Lercangee, Francine. 1986. Joyce Carol Oates: An Annotated Bibliography. Garland Publishing, Inc. New York and London. ISBN 0-8240-8908-1
- Wesley, Marilyn C. 1994. "Love's Journey in Crossing the Border" in Joyce Carol Oates: A Study of the Short Fiction. Twayne's studies in short fiction; no. 57. Twayne Publishers, New York. pp. 174–180 ISBN 0-8057-0857-X
