= Crossing the Border =

Crossing the Border may refer to:

- Crossing the Border (short story collection), a collection of short stories by Joyce Carol Oates
- Crossing the Border (film), a 2006 Spanish comedy-drama film
- Crossing the Border, an album by Rawlins Cross
