= The Seduction and Other Stories =

American collection of short stories

- First edition
- Author: Joyce Carol Oates
- Language: English
- Publisher: Black Sparrow Press
- Publication date: 1975
- Publication place: United States
- Media type: Print (hardback & paperback)
- Pages: 263
- ISBN: 978-0876852286

The Seduction and Other Stories is a collection containing 16 works of short fiction by Joyce Carol Oates published by Black Sparrow Press in 1975.

== Stories ==
Stories that first appeared in literary journals are indicated.

- "An American Adventure" (Triquarterly, Winter 1971)
- "Gifts" (Kenyon Review, Fall 1966)
- "Getting and Spending"
- "On the Gulf" (South Carolina Review, November 1975)
- "The Seduction" (South Carolina Review, Summer 1974)
- "Passions and Meditations" 172 (Partisan Review, 1973)
- "6:27 P.M." (Redbook, December 1971)
- "Out of Place" (Virginia Quarterly Review, Summer 1968)
- "Notes on Contributors" (Triquarterly, Winter 1971)
- "The Imposters" (Review of Existential Psychology and Psychiatry, Spring 1973)
- "Year of Wonders"
- "The Madwoman" (Review of Existential Psychology and Psychiatry, 1973)
- "DOUBLE TRAGEDY STRIKES TENNESSEE HILL FAMILY" (The Carolina Quarterly, Winter 1972)
- "The Stone House" (Quarterly Review of Literature, 1965)
- "Hell"
- "The Dreaming Woman"

== Reception ==
Multiple publications reviewed the collection after its publication. Literary critic Elizabeth Pochoda writing in The New York Times opens her review of The Seduction and Other Stories defending Oates against unnamed critics who equate her immense literary output with "second-rate" writers. Pochoda argues that Oates's output, style and narrative are matched to the author's social and literary concerns:

[Oates's] fairly straightforward narrative form and unobtrusive prose style are deliberately chosen for their appropriateness in dealing with those long uncomfortable looks at nihilism and affirmation which are at the center of her work. Her subject matter, which is now as much as ever that of consciousness in a state of risk, benefits from being grounded in fairly straight narration and realistic detail.

Jane Baker reviewed the collection for The Antioch Review, commenting that the stories felt the same but that "Yet these stories make curiously compelling reading." Peggy Constantine of Democrat and Chronicle noted that "Oates' penchant for peering into souls on the brink of terminal physical or mental illnesses is fatiguing, but she does win your attention."

== Style and theme ==
"Oates's work has been the subject of an enormous amount of critical response [and], as the writer herself has observed, much of the criticism has been of extremely high quality. Her short fiction has been praised more highly than her work in any other genre. —Literary Critic Greg Johnson in Joyce Carol Oates; A Study of the Short Fiction (1994)

The volume "contains some of her best revelations of complexity in lives ordinarily thought to be without depth or value." The subjects that concern Oates are those members of the American working-class—"hairdressers, assembly‐line workers, gum‐ cracking teen‐agers"—encountered in "shopping malls, tract housing, drive‐ins and car lots."

Pochoda cautions that the "oppressive sense of dread" conveyed in virtually all the stories may create fatigue in readers. As such, she suggests "read[ing] the stories at decent intervals and not go straight through the book as one might with a collection of Cheever's.

== Sources ==
- Baker, Jane (1976). "The Seduction and Other Stories (review)". The Antioch Review. 34 (3): 377. doi:10.2307/4637803. JSTOR 4637803.
- Johnson, Greg (1994). Joyce Carol Oates: a study of the short fiction. Twayne's studies in short fiction. New York: Twayne publ. ISBN 978-0-8057-0857-8.
- Lercangee, Francine. 1986. Joyce Carol Oates: An Annotated Bibliography. Garland Publishing, New York and London. ISBN 0-8240-8908-1
- Oates, Joyce Carol. 1975. The Seduction and Other Stories. Black Sparrow Press, San Francisco. ISBN 978-0876852286
- Pochoda, Elizabeth. 1975. "Joyce Carol Oates Honoring the Complexities of the Real World." The New York Times, August 31, 1975. Joyce Carol Oates honoring the complexities of the real world Retrieved 10 November 2023.
