= Wrong Norma =

2024 poetry collection by Anne Carson

- Author: Anne Carson
- Publisher: New Directions Publishing
- Publication date: February 6, 2024
- Pages: 192
- ISBN: 978-0811230346
- Preceded by: Float

Wrong Norma is a 2024 poetry collection by Anne Carson, published by New Directions Publishing. It was designated a finalist for the 2024 National Book Award for Poetry.

== Content ==
The book's poems span various genres, sometimes taking on the form of prose poetry or even outright prose. Some pages visually resemble a scrapbook in which passages are spliced and replaced, with some being blurry or otherwise hard to read. Other poems make literary references to Euripides, Monty Python, Martin Heidegger, Joseph Conrad, Marilyn Monroe, John Ashbery, and others.

For The Paris Review, Carson stated that she wanted to interrogate wrongness due to the dichotomy of right or wrong which she faced as a scholar: "something you always feel in academic life is that you're wrong or on the verge of being wrong and you have to worry about that, because everything is so judgmental and hierarchical." In another interview, Carson stated that the wrongness of the book's namesake comes from the fact that "the pieces in the book were not written at the same time and were not intended to be read as a coherent organism or organic process."

== Critical reception ==
In a starred review, Publishers Weekly said "These are original poems from a poet who pushes and renews the medium."

Some critics noted the haphazardness and recklessness of Carson's approach to language. The Guardian wrote that "reading her new book, I see something more revealing going on: the sense of how difficult it is for anyone to say precisely what they mean. Words, here, are not trusted collaborators." The Cleveland Review of Books said "Carson's project of extended adolescence—her rejection of imposed categories—persists, for better or worse. We should be thankful for it ... It is a restless, searching work, the latest attempt in a lifelong quest to find language that can express the ineffable, only the domain of that ineffability has extended beyond the realm of singular personal experience." The London Review of Books suggested "we are peeking at a sort of scrapbook".

Other critics observed Carson's typical skirting of categorization with regard to her work. The Nation called the book a textbook example of Carson with its "confusing slipperiness" and its "wide range" spanning "different disguises, different genres, different genders, and different voices". Similarly, The Los Angeles Review of Books wrote: "With Wrong Norma, Carson seems almost interested to do away with the Self entirely, inhabiting a number of unlikely personas, from Joseph Conrad and the ancient Greek general Alkibiades to the time-defying sky itself". The Daily Telegraph called Carson's poems "fun" while dismissing the longstanding argument about "either/or questions: fiction or nonfiction, prose or verse, translation or original writing."
