= Border Crossing =

Border Crossing may refer to:

- Border Crossing (novel), a 2001 novel by English author Pat Barker
- Border Crossing, an album by saxophonist Mike Osborne
- Border Crossing (adventure), for the role-playing game Espionage!
- Border control, the measures used by a country to monitor or regulate its borders
- Border checkpoint, the actual place to cross a border

== See also ==
- Boardercross, a type of snowboard competition
- Crossing the Border (disambiguation)
- Crossing Border Festival, an annual festival of music and books in The Hague
