= Red Doc =

Book by Anne Carson

Red Doc>
- First edition
- Author: Anne Carson
- Publisher: Alfred A. Knopf
- Publication date: 2013
- Awards: Griffin Poetry Prize
- Preceded by: Autobiography of Red

Red Doc> is a book by classicist and poet Anne Carson, which combines poetry, prose, and drama. Published in 2013, it resumes the story of her 1998 verse novel Autobiography of Red.

The characters of both poems are modern re-imaginings of the Greek mythological figures Geryon and Herakles, as described in Stesichoros' poem Geryoneis. Stesichoros' poem retells the tenth labour of Herakles, in which Herakles kills the monster Geryon, a winged red being, in order to steal his cattle. In Autobiography of Red, Geryon was a teenage boy, artistic and gay, in love with the popular and charming Herakles. Red Doc> resumes their story as adults. Geryon is now known as G, and Herakles is referred to in the poem as Sad But Great after his return from war with PTSD. G and Sad go on a road trip with an artist named Ida to make their way to visit G's dying mother.

Red Doc> was reviewed by Katryn Schulz as "greater than... the sum of its parts," successfully bringing together disparate elements:

This is Carson's obsession, and her gift: to make meaning from the fragments we get, which are also all we get – of time, of the past, of each other. It doesn't last, of course; the arrow of gravity, like the arrow of time, points only in one direction. Still, for a moment, she gets it all to hang together up there, the joy made keener by the coming fall. Sad but great: In the end it seemed to me that Carson had found the proper name for everything – her character, this book, this life.

Red Doc> was awarded the 2014 Griffin Poetry Prize.
