= 2026 Nobel Prize in Literature =

Award

- "for her bold and inventive oeuvre that, in playful dialogue with the classical tradition, has created new forms for contemporary literature".
- Date: 8 October 2026 (announcement); 10 December 2026 (ceremony)
- Location: Stockholm, Sweden
- Presented by: Swedish Academy
- First award: 1901
- Currently held by: Anne Carson
- Website: 2026 Nobel Prize in Literature

The 2026 Nobel Prize in Literature has been awarded to Canadian poet Anne Carson "for her bold and inventive oeuvre that, in playful dialogue with the classical tradition, has created new forms for contemporary literature."

The Swedish Academy announced the decision in Stockholm on 8 October 2026, and the prize will be presented on 10 December. Established under the will of Alfred Nobel, the prize honors outstanding literary work.

== Nominations ==
Nominations can only be done by qualified nominators, namely members of the Swedish Academy and of other academies, institutions and societies which are similar to it in construction and purpose; professors of literature and of linguistics at universities and colleges; previous Nobel Prize laureates in Literature; and chairpersons of writers' organizations qualifying as representative of their countries' production of literature and belles lettres. The rules stipulate that nominations are not to be made public, and it is not permitted to nominate oneself, which automatically disqualifies the nominee during deliberations.

== Possible contenders ==
Despite the secrecy, many notable writers around the globe are perennially expected to be among the official nominees and favored to win the prestigious literary prize, such as Haruki Murakami, Karl Ove Knausgård, Margaret Atwood or Gerald Murnane. In addition, some betting houses publish odds on some of the perceived contenders winning the prize.

Authors listed as having odds equal to or better than 22/1 of winning the 2026 Nobel Literature Prize
Author	Country	Betting Odds
Anne Carson	Canada	10/1
Can Xue	China	10/1
Haruki Murakami	Japan	14/1
Gerald Murnane	Australia	16/1
Thomas Pynchon	USA	16/1
Margaret Atwood	Canada	20/1
Michel Houellebecq	France	20/1
Lídia Jorge	Portugal	20/1
Jamaica Kincaid	USA	20/1
Cristina Rivera Garza	Mexico	20/1
Lyudmila Ulitskaya	Russia	20/1
Enrique Vila-Matas	Spain	20/1
Karl Ove Knausgaard	Norway	22/1

== Nobel Committee ==
The 2026 Nobel Committee consists of the following members:

Committee Members
Seat No.	Picture	Name	Elected	Position	Profession
4		Anders Olsson (b. 1949)	2008	committee chair	literary critic, literary historian
5		Ingrid Carlberg (b. 1961)	2020	associate member permanent secretary	author, journalist
9		Ellen Mattson (b. 1963)	2019	member	novelist, essayist
14		Steve Sem-Sandberg (b. 1958)	2021	member	journalist, author, translator
13		Anne Swärd (b. 1969)	2019	member	novelist
16		Anna-Karin Palm (b. 1961)	2023	associate member	novelist, culture writer
