= The Glass Essay =

Poem by Anne Carson

"The Glass Essay" is a poem by Canadian poet and essayist Anne Carson. This thirty-six page poem opens Carson's Glass, Irony and God, which was published in 1995.

== Content ==
In the poem, the narrator – who is visiting her mother's home on the Canadian moors – meditates on an ex-lover, the poems of Emily Brontë, and a variety of other interrelated topics. Carson describes the poem as an attempt at "understanding what life feels like."

== Composition ==
The piece consists of nine distinct subtitled sections, each of which consists of three or four-lined stanzas. The first three sections of the poem set up the framework of the poem's structure, describing the narrative environment, physical landscape and interpersonal relationships that concern the narrator.

Carson herself, along with several critics, have referred to the poem as a lyric essay, despite its inclusion in a book of poetry.

== Reception ==
The poem has been republished in several anthologies, including the 2006 version of The Norton Anthology of English Literature. Despite international acclaim from scholars such as classicist Guy Davenport, Carson has also been criticized for her "chopped prose."
