= Norma Jeane Baker of Troy =

Play by Anne Carson

Norma Jeane Baker of Troy is a "spoken and sung performance piece" written by the Canadian author and classicist Anne Carson, which debuted in New York City in 2019. The non-linear plot is loosely based upon the play Helen, written by Euripides in 412 BCE and superimposes Marilyn Monroe over the legendary figure of Helen of Troy.

== Plot ==
On New Year's Eve, 1963, an unnamed screenwriter works with his female stenographer in an empty New York office in order to finish his ambitious screenwriting project (the text he is writing is the same as Norma Jeane Baker of Troy, which was published by Oberon Books) based on Euripides' Helen. This version differs from the more popular story of Helen of Troy as Euripides' states that Helen never sailed to Troy with Paris, but was instead transported to Egypt by the gods while Paris brought a phantom Helen with him to Troy. In the play, the phantom is described as a cloud, and the cloud motif continues throughout. The screenwriter interrupts his own dictation frequently, distracted by the recent death of a similarly tragic and gorgeous woman, Marilyn Monroe. He begins to share biographical facts about Monroe and offers his own reflections about her life, and, while doing so, begins to change out of his work clothing and into a Marilyn Monroe costume that resembles her white dress in The Seven Year Itch. The screenwriter presents Monroe as a parallel to Euripides' Helen, bringing in other parallel characters from Monroe's own life, like Truman Capote, Fritz Lang, Pearl Bailey, and "Arthur, King of Sparta and New York," an amalgamation of Helen's husband Menelaus and Monroe's third husband Arthur Miller.

== Production ==
The play was commissioned for the inaugural theatrical season of The Shed (Hudson Yards) and was announced in 2018. The play was directed by Katie Mitchell and the music was composed by Paul Clark. Carson wrote the play with the actor Ben Whishaw in mind, having previously worked with him in a production of her translation of The Bakkhai in 2015. Whishaw stars opposite the opera singer Renée Fleming, who plays the stenographer. Clark created all of the background music using pre-recorded selections of Fleming singing, which he manipulated in the studio.

== Reception ==
Reviews of the play have been mixed. The New York Times praised Carson's writing and the performances of both Whishaw and Fleming, calling them "marvelous." The Telegraph instead criticized the excessive coldness and lack of humanity in the play and its characters, writing that the work was intelligent but difficult to appreciate. The Daily Beast praised the score and the performances of both Whishaw and Fleming, but found the play itself to be incomprehensible.

It was the winner of the Governor General's Award for English-language poetry at the 2020 Governor General's Awards.
