= Anne Carson =

Canadian poet and academic

Anne Carson CM
- Carson in 2024
- Born: Anne Patricia Carson; June 21, 1950 (age 76); Toronto, Ontario, Canada
- Citizenship: Canada; Iceland
- Education: University of Toronto (BA, MA, PhD)
- Occupations: Poet; essayist; translator; classicist; professor
- Spouse: Robert Currie
- Writing career
- Period: 1979–present
- Genres: Poetry; essay; translation
- Notable works: Eros the Bittersweet (1986); Autobiography of Red (1998); Men in the Off Hours (2000); The Beauty of the Husband (2001); Red Doc> (2013)
- Notable awards: Lannan Literary Award (1996); Guggenheim Fellowship (1998); MacArthur Fellowship (2000); Griffin Poetry Prize (2001, 2013); Governor General's Award (2001); T. S. Eliot Prize (2001); Member of the Order of Canada (2005); Princess of Asturias Award (2020); PEN/Nabokov Award (2021); Nobel Prize in Literature (2026)

Anne Patricia Carson (born June 21, 1950) is a Canadian academic and author who was awarded the 2026 Nobel Prize in Literature "for her bold and inventive oeuvre that, in playful dialogue with the classical tradition, has created new forms for contemporary literature."

Born in Toronto, she graduated from the University of Toronto and has worked as a professor and lecturer at several universities since 1979. Throughout her career she has taught classics, comparative literature, and creative writing. She has taught at the University of Calgary, Princeton University, Emory University, McGill University, University of Michigan, and New York University. Carson has written more than twenty books, including collections of essays and poetry, as well as translations of ancient Greek tragedies. She has been awarded Guggenheim and MacArthur Fellowships, has won the Lannan Literary Award, two Griffin Poetry Prizes, the T. S. Eliot Prize, the Princess of Asturias Award, the Governor General's Award for English-language poetry, and the PEN/Nabokov Award, and was appointed a Member of the Order of Canada in 2005 for her contribution to Canadian letters.

== Biography ==
=== Early life and education ===
Anne Carson was born in Toronto, Canada, on June 21, 1950. Her father was a banker and she grew up in a number of small Canadian towns. In 1965, while living in Stoney Creek, Ontario, she discovered a bilingual version of Sappho's works, edited and translated by Willis Barnstone, at a Hamilton mall, which sparked her passion for Ancient Greek translation. At Bishop Ryan Catholic Secondary School, she was taught by the Latin teacher on a volunteer basis during her lunch hours.

In 1968, Carson enrolled at St. Michael's College at the University of Toronto, but was frustrated by the compulsory courses required for her arts degree such as a mandatory course on John Milton. She dropped out twice, at the end of her first and second years, choosing instead to work for a short time in the graphic arts. She eventually returned to the University of Toronto, where she completed her Bachelor of Arts degree in 1974, her Master of Arts in classics in 1975, and her Ph.D. in classics in 1981. She also spent a year studying Greek metrics and textual criticism at the University of St Andrews.

=== Career in academia ===
Carson began her Classics teaching career at the University of Calgary in 1979, before completing her Ph.D. at the University of Toronto. In 1980, she joined Princeton University, where she taught as instructor, and later assistant professor. She also taught at the 92nd Street Y in New York during her time there as a Rockefeller Scholar in Residence (1986–1987). Having been denied tenure, Carson left Princeton in 1987 to teach classical languages and literature at Emory University in Atlanta for a year, before moving to Montreal to join McGill University as Director of Graduate Studies in Classics.

In the late 1990s, Carson's teaching career hit a hurdle when McGill cancelled all graduate courses in ancient Greek, closed its Classics Department, and moved all remaining Classics courses to its History Department. While continuing to teach at McGill as associate professor, Carson dealt with this by spending half of each year as a guest lecturer at other institutions, including the University of Michigan (Norman Freehling Visiting Professorship, 1999–2000), the University of California, Berkeley (Spring 2000), and the California College of Arts and Crafts in Oakland (Spring 2001). She was appointed John MacNaughton Professor of Classics at McGill in 2000.

In 2003, Carson moved to Ann Arbor and the University of Michigan, where she served as Professor of Classical Studies, Comparative Literature, and English Language and Literature until 2009. In 2004, Carson was in contention for the Professor of Poetry post at the University of Oxford, placing second behind the eventual appointment Christopher Ricks, with around 30 nominations. She was cited as a potential contender for the four-year position again in 2009. In 2006, she was a Visiting Scholar at the Getty Villa, the same year that the institution launched an ancient theatre series with the inaugural play being her translation of Euripides' Hippolytus (play).

Carson joined the New York University (NYU) Creative Writing Program as Distinguished Poet-in-Residence and Visiting Professor in 2009. Together with her husband and collaborator Robert Currie, she teaches an annual class at NYU on the art of collaboration, called "Egocircus". Carson was an Andrew D. White Professor-at-Large at Cornell University from 2010 to 2016, and the Mohr Visiting Poet at Stanford University (Creative Writing Program) in 2013. She joined Bard College in Annandale-on-Hudson, New York, as Visiting Distinguished Writer-in-Residence in 2014, teaching classical studies and the written arts. Carson has described her more diverse role in the latter part of her career as "a visiting [whatever]", and her decades spent teaching ancient Greek as "a total joy".

=== Notable honours ===
Carson was elected a Royal Society of Literature International Writer in 2022. In May 2023, she was announced as Honorary President of the Classical Association, 2023–2024. She was awarded the international Vigdís Prize, an award conferred for outstanding contributions to world languages and cultures.

In 2026, she was awarded the Nobel Prize in Literature. In the biobibliography accompanying the Nobel award, committee chair Anders Olsson described Carson's juxtaposition of classical and modern writers as central to her creation of new literary forms. He cited her pairing of Simonides with Paul Celan in Economy of the Unlost, and of Thucydides with Virginia Woolf in Men in the Off Hours. He also treated her Greek translations as literary works in their own right.

== Literature ==
=== Writing ===
Carson is trained as a classicist and translator of Ancient Greek, but her own writing fuses ideas and themes from many fields and forms, sometimes using prose, poetry, and essay in the same work and imagining discussions between modern celebrities and figures from the ancient classics.

First editions of Carson's eighteen books of writings (as of 2021) have been published by Alfred A. Knopf, New Directions, and the Princeton University Press in the US, by Brick Books and McClelland & Stewart in Canada, and by Bloodaxe Books, Jonathan Cape, Oberon Books, and Sylph Editions in the UK.

In 2025, Carson appeared on The Great Lakes Suite, an album by Canadian indie rock band Rheostatics, narrating several poems inspired by the Great Lakes.

==== Works ====
Eros the Bittersweet – Carson's first book of criticism, published in 1986 – examines eros as a simultaneous experience of pleasure and pain best exemplified by "glukupikron", a word of Sappho's creation and the "bittersweet" of the book's title. It considers how triangulations of desire appear in the writings of Sappho, ancient Greek novelists, and Plato. A reworking of her 1981 doctoral thesis Odi et Amo Ergo Sum ("I Hate and I Love, Therefore I Am"), Eros the Bittersweet "laid the groundwork for her subsequent publications, […] formulating the ideas on desire that would come to dominate her poetic output", and establishing her "style of patterning her writings after classical Greek literature". Her poem The Glass Essay is 30 pages long.

Men in the Off Hours (2000) is a hybrid collection of short poems, verse essays, epitaphs, commemorative prose, interviews, scripts, and translations from ancient Greek and Latin (of Alcman, Catullus, Sappho and others). The book broke with Carson's established pattern of writing long poems. The pieces include diverse references to writers, thinkers, and artists, both classical and modern, as well as to historical, biblical, and mythological figures, including: Oedipus, Hector, Thucydides, Lazarus of Bethany, Augustine, John James Audubon, Emily Dickinson, Edward Hopper, Franz Kafka, Marcel Proust, Gertrude Stein, Virginia Woolf, and her own recently deceased mother.

Carson delivered a series of "short talks", or short-format poems on various subjects, at the address to the University of Toronto Ph.D. graduating class of 2012. She also participated in the Bush Theatre's project Sixty Six Books in 2011, writing a piece titled "Jude: The Goat at Midnight" based on the Epistle of Jude from the King James Bible.

==== Reception ====
Carson's first book of poetry – 1984's Canicula di Anna – garnered her first literary prize: the Quarterly Review of Literature Betty Colladay Award. Acclaim for her first book of essays, Eros the Bittersweet, grew in the fifteen years after it was published in 1986: the book "first stunned the classics community as a work of Greek scholarship; then it stunned the nonfiction community as an inspired return to the lyrically based essays once produced by Seneca, Montaigne, and Emerson; and then, and only then, deep into the 1990s, reissued as 'literature' and redesigned for an entirely new audience, it finally stunned the poets." By the turn of the millennium, Eros the Bittersweet had also entered into the popular consciousness, voted onto the 1999 Modern Library Reader's List for the 100 Best Nonfiction books of the 20th century, and mentioned (along with Autobiography of Red) in a 2004 episode of the television series The L Word.

Early recognition for her work also came from the Quebec Writers' Federation Awards (known as "QSPELL" until 1998), which shortlisted Carson for Short Talks in 1993 before going on to award her the honour three times between 1996 and 2001 (for Glass, Irony, and God, Autobiography of Red, and The Beauty of the Husband). Carson's early publications saw her shortlisted for the 1994 Journey Prize for "Water Margins", and brought her the 1996 Lannan Literary Award for Poetry, and the 1997 Pushcart Prize for her poem "Jaget". In 1997, Carson was awarded a Rockefeller Bellagio Center Fellowship, followed by a Guggenheim Fellowship for Poetry in 1998, and a MacArthur Fellowship (commonly known as the "Genius Grant") in 2000.

Carson was shortlisted for the National Book Critics Circle Award three times: for Autobiography of Red in 1998, Men in the Off Hours in 2000, and Nox in 2010. making her and Alice Munro the first two non-Americans to be nominated after the Award went global in 1998. She was also shortlisted for the Forward Prize in 1998 for Glass and God, her first book of poetry published in the UK. Shortlisted for the T. S. Eliot Prize four times between 1999 and 2013, Carson won for The Beauty of the Husband in 2001 (her third consecutive nomination), making her the first woman to be awarded this honour. Carson was the first poet to be awarded the Griffin Poetry Prize (for Men in the Off Hours in 2001), and the first to win the prize for a second time (for Red Doc> in 2013). She was also a judge for the 2010 Griffin Poetry Prize.

Carson was appointed a Member of the Order of Canada in 2005, the announcement describing her as "a singular voice in the literature of our country". She was awarded an honorary degree by her alma mater, the University of Toronto, in 2012. She also received an honorary doctorate in 2014 from the University of St Andrews, where she studied for a diploma with Kenneth Dover in 1975–1976.

In 2018, Carson was longlisted for the one-time New Academy Prize in Literature, established as an alternative to the postponed 2018 Nobel Prize. In 2020, she was awarded the Princess of Asturias Award for Literature, with the jury noting that she "has attained levels of intensity and intellectual standing that place her among the most outstanding of present-day writers". In 2021, Carson won the PEN/Nabokov Award for Achievement in International Literature, honouring a body of work marked by "enduring originality and consummate craftsmanship", and received the 2020 Governor General's Award for English-language poetry for Norma Jeane Baker of Troy, an award she was first shortlisted for in 2001 (for Men in the Off Hours). Her 2024 book, Wrong Norma, was longlisted for the National Book Award for Poetry.

Carson has also been the subject of two edited volumes: Anne Carson: Ecstatic Lyre, edited by Joshua Marie Wilkinson and published by the University of Michigan Press in 2015, which is dedicated to the breadth of her works; and Anne Carson/ Antiquity (sic), edited by Laura Jansen and published by Bloomsbury in 2021, which examines Carson's classicism as it emerges in her poetry, translations, essays, and visual artistry. In 2023, Anne Carson: The Glass Essayist, a critical monograph on Carson's work by Elizabeth Sarah Coles, was published by Oxford University Press. The book was awarded the Poetry Foundation's Pegasus Award for Poetry Criticism in 2024.

=== Translation ===
Carson has published translations of ten ancient Greek tragedies – one by Aeschylus (Agamemnon), two by Sophocles (Antigone, Electra), and seven by Euripides (Alcestis, Hecuba, Herakles, Hippolytus, Iphigenia in Tauris, Orestes, and The Bacchae) – as well as the poetry of Sappho in English. Carson's translations have been published by Alfred A. Knopf, Farrar, Straus and Giroux, the New York Review of Books, and the University of Chicago Press in the US, and by Oberon Books and the Oxford University Press in the UK.

Carson was a Rockefeller Scholar-in-Residence at the 92nd Street Y (New York City) from August 1986 to August 1987, where she worked on a translation of Sophocles' Electra. It was eventually published in 2001 and included in her 2009 book An Oresteia, which won the PEN Award for Poetry in Translation in 2010. Featuring Aeschylus' Agamemnon, Sophocles' Electra, and Euripides' Orestes, An Oresteia was staged in New York by the Classic Stage Company in 2009.

Carson was also an Anna-Maria Kellen Fellow at the American Academy in Berlin in 2007, where she worked on a translation of the ancient Greek play Prometheus Bound (attributed to Aeschylus), an excerpt of which was published in 2010.

In 2015, a production of Carson's Antigone directed by Ivo van Hove and starring Juliette Binoche opened at Les Théâtres de la Ville de Luxembourg in 2015 before travelling to cities in Europe and the US, including London (Barbican Centre), New York (BAM), and Paris (Théâtre de la Ville).

== Personal life ==
Carson is known for being very protective of her private life, and discourages autobiographical readings of her writings. Information about her in publications is often limited to the phrase: "Anne Carson was born in Canada and teaches ancient Greek for a living." While not a confessional poet, her work is considered personal. Carson has said that in her work, she uses her life democratically as just one set of facts among others in the world.

Carson's first marriage, during which she used the surname Giacomelli, lasted eight years and ended in 1980. This union, and its aftermath, has been claimed as a source for "Kinds of Water" (collected in Plainwater), and for The Beauty of the Husband. Carson has confirmed that her first husband took her notebooks when they divorced (as happens to the protagonist in The Beauty of the Husband), though later returned them.

Carson's father Robert had Alzheimer's disease. Her poems "The Glass Essay" in 1994 and "The Anthropology of Water" (collected in Plainwater) discuss his mental and physical decline due to the disease.

Carson's mother Margaret (1913–1997) died during the writing of Men in the Off Hours. Carson closed the collection with the prose piece "Appendix to Ordinary Time", using crossed-out phrases from the diaries and manuscripts of Virginia Woolf to craft an epitaph for her. Red Doc> has been read as a second elegy for the death of her mother. Carson has described her mother as the love of her life.

Carson's brother Michael was arrested for drug dealing in 1978. Jumping bail, he fled Canada and she never saw him again. Carson dealt with the disappearance of her brother from her life in "Water Margins: An Essay on Swimming by My Brother" (collected in Plainwater), which is written as a kind of memoir. In 2000, he called her and they arranged to meet in Copenhagen where he lived, but he died before they could reconnect. Nox, an epitaph Carson created for her brother in 2000 and published in 2010, has been described as her most explicitly personal work.

Carson is married to the artist Robert Currie, whom she met in Ann Arbor while teaching at the University of Michigan. She has described Currie as "my collaborator-husband person". Projects they have worked on together include book designs and performances for Nox and Antigonick. Carson also refers to Currie as "the Randomizer" during their creative process.

In April 2022, Carson and Currie were granted Icelandic citizenship.

In an article in the London Review of Books in August 2024, Carson revealed that she had been diagnosed with Parkinson's disease.

== List of awards and fellowships ==
=== Winner ===
- 1984: Quarterly Review of Literature Betty Colladay Award for Canicula di Anna
- 1996: Lannan Literary Award for Poetry
- 1996: QSPELL Award – A. M. Klein Prize for Poetry for Glass, Irony and God
- 1997: Pushcart Prize for "Jaget"
- 1998: QSPELL Award – A. M. Klein Prize for Poetry for Autobiography of Red
- 2001: Griffin Poetry Prize for Men in the Off Hours (Canadian winner)
- 2001: T. S. Eliot Prize for The Beauty of the Husband
- 2001: Los Angeles Times Book Prize for Poetry for The Beauty of the Husband
- 2001: QWF Award – A. M. Klein Prize for Poetry for The Beauty of the Husband
- 2010: PEN Award for Poetry in Translation for An Oresteia
- 2012: Criticos Prize (London Hellenic Prize) for Antigonick
- 2014: Griffin Poetry Prize for Red Doc> (Canadian winner)
- 2016: Blue Metropolis International Literary Grand Prize for lifetime achievement
- 2019: Manuel Acuña International Poetry Prize
- 2020: Princess of Asturias Award for Literature
- 2020: Governor General's Literary Award for Norma Jeane Baker of Troy
- 2021: PEN/Nabokov Award for Achievement in International Literature
- 2025: Paris Review Hadada Prize for lifetime achievement
- 2025: Zbigniew Herbert International Literary Award
- 2026: Nobel Prize in Literature.

=== Finalist ===
- 1993: QSPELL Award – A. M. Klein Prize for Poetry shortlist for Short Talks
- 1994: Journey Prize shortlist for "Water Margins"
- 1998: Forward Prize shortlist for Glass and God
- 1998: National Book Critics Circle Award Poetry finalist for Autobiography of Red
- 1999: T. S. Eliot Prize shortlist for Autobiography of Red
- 2000: T. S. Eliot Prize shortlist for Men in the Off Hours
- 2000: National Book Critics Circle Award Poetry finalist for Men in the Off Hours
- 2001: Governor General's Literary Award Poetry finalist for Men in the Off Hours
- 2002: Lenore Marshall Poetry Prize finalist for The Beauty of the Husband
- 2010: National Book Critics Circle Award Poetry finalist for Nox
- 2013: T. S. Eliot Prize shortlist for Red Doc>
- 2013: The Kitschies Red Tentacle Award (best novel) finalist for Red Doc>
- 2014: Folio Prize shortlist for Red Doc>
- 2018: New Academy Prize in Literature longlist
- 2022: Governor General's Literary Award Poetry finalist for H of H Playbook

=== Fellowships ===
- 1997: Rockefeller Bellagio Center Fellowship
- 1998: Guggenheim Fellowship for Poetry
- 2000: MacArthur Fellowship
- 2007: Anna-Maria Kellen Fellowship, The American Academy in Berlin
- 2011: Creative Scotland / Cove Park Muriel Spark Fellowship
- 2018: Inga Maren Otto Fellowship, The Watermill Center

=== Academic ===
- 1986–1987: Rockefeller Scholar-in-Residence at the 92nd Street Y (New York)
- 2012: Honorary degree from the University of Toronto
- 2014: Honorary degree (Doctor of Letters) from the University of St Andrews

=== Other ===
- 1999: American Academy of Arts and Sciences International Honorary Member
- 1999: Modern Library: 100 Best Nonfiction Books (Reader's List) – Eros the Bittersweet
- 2000: New York Times Notable Books of the Year List – Men in the Off Hours
- 2005: Member of the Order of Canada
- 2010: Griffin Poetry Prize Judge
- 2011: American Academy of Arts and Letters Foreign Honorary Member

== List of selected works ==
=== Writings ===
- Eros the Bittersweet (1986)
- Short Talks (1992)
- Glass, Irony, and God (1995) – includes "The Glass Essay"
- Plainwater (1995)
- Autobiography of Red (1998)
- Economy of the Unlost (1999)
- Men in the Off Hours (2000)
- The Beauty of the Husband (2001)
- Decreation (2005)
- Nox (2010) – incorporates translation of Catullus 101
- Antigonick (2012) – version of Antigone by Sophocles
- Red Doc> (2013) – follow-up to Autobiography of Red
- Nay Rather (2013)
- The Albertine Workout (2014)
- Float (2016)
- Norma Jeane Baker of Troy (2019) – version of Helen by Euripides
- The Trojan Women: A Comic (2021) – version of the Euripides play
- H of H Playbook (2021) – about Herakles by Euripides
- Wrong Norma (2024)

=== Translations ===
- Electra (2001) – Electra by Sophocles
- If Not, Winter (2002) – the poetry of Sappho
- Grief Lessons (2006) – Herakles, Hecuba, Hippolytus, and Alcestis by Euripides
- An Oresteia (2009) – Agamemnon by Aeschylus, Electra by Sophocles, Orestes by Euripides
- Iphigenia Among the Taurians (2014) – Iphigenia in Tauris by Euripides
- Antigone (2015) – Antigone by Sophocles
- Bakkhai (2015) – The Bacchae by Euripides
