= The Beauty of the Husband =

2001 collection of poetry by Anne Carson

The Beauty of the Husband: A Fictional Essay in 29 Tangos
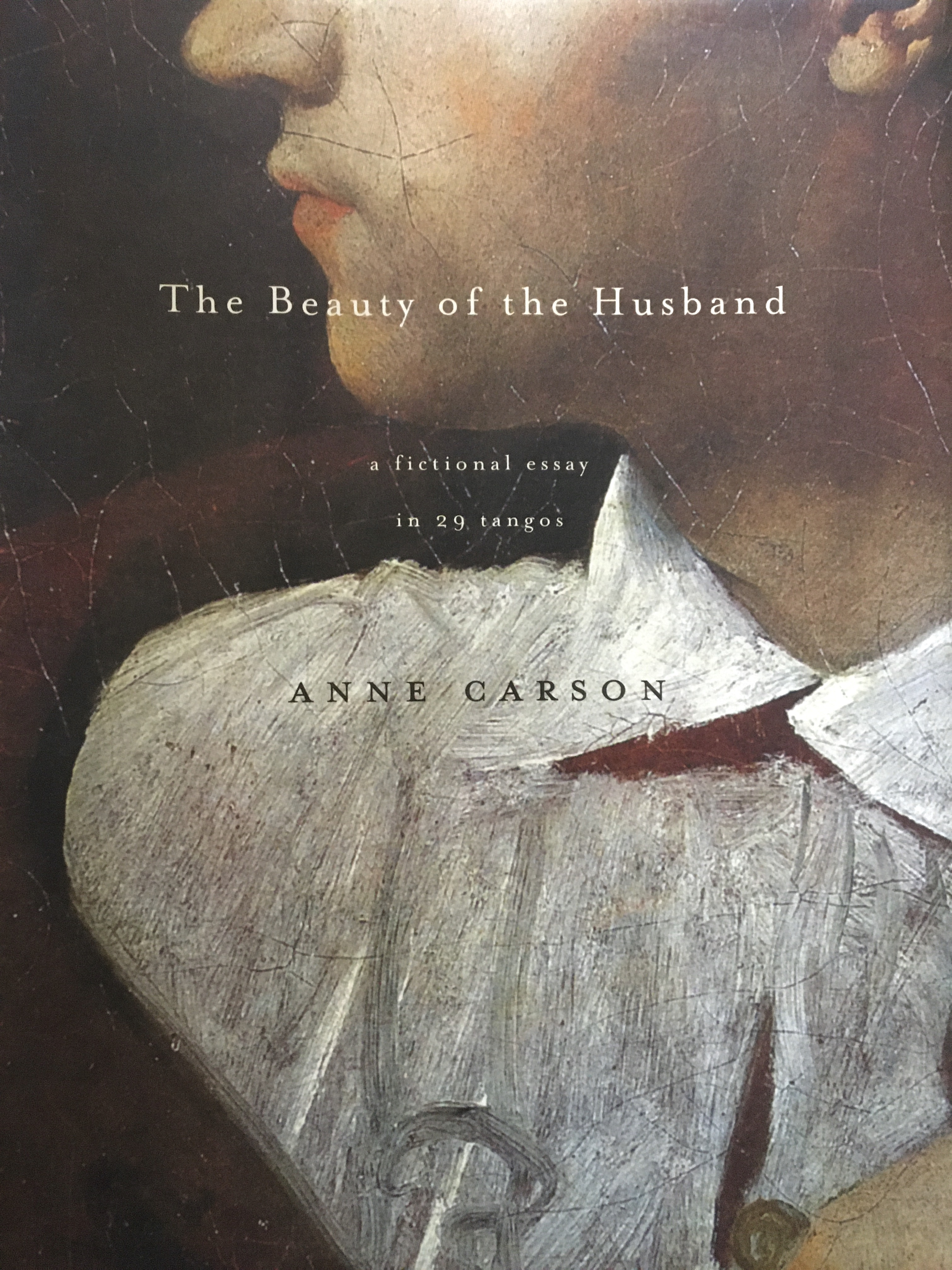
- First Edition
- Author: Anne Carson
- Language: English
- Genre: Poetry
- Published: 2001
- Publication place: United States
- Pages: 160
- Awards: T. S. Eliot Prize; LA Times Book Prize; QWF Award
- ISBN: 0375707573

The Beauty of the Husband: A Fictional Essay in 29 Tangos is a 2001 collection of poetry by Anne Carson that won her the T. S. Eliot Prize.

== Summary ==
The Beauty of the Husband includes narrative verse that describes erotic, painful, and heartbreaking scenes from a doomed marriage. A tango (like a marriage) is something you have to dance to the end. The essay traces the development from adolescent fixation to post-divorce adult fixation, and begins when the main character's mother insists that the male subject is not to be trusted. The grandfather of the male subject mentions that under no circumstances should she marry his grandson, whom he calls "tragikos" – a word meaning either tragic or goat. The decades-long doomed relationship that follows features betrayal, adultery, separation, and sensuality, and is marked by prophecy, disillusionment, and poignancy.

Carson's essay is a powerful, moving, and often wryly amusing exploration of how people become the victims of desires they cannot control. The 29 "tangos" are titled and numbered sections of long lines which alternate with much shorter lines to suggest the movements of tango dancers. There is also a thirtieth entry by the husband.

The essay is dedicated to John Keats, "for his general surrender to beauty." In his "Ode on a Grecian Urn", Keats concludes that "Beauty is truth, truth beauty,–that is all / Ye know on earth, and all ye need to know." Each section in the essay begins with a quote from Keats, and the collection as a whole is framed by his aphorism "Beauty is Truth, Truth Beauty".

Carson, though an accomplished and celebrated writer, has previously mentioned that at heart she considers herself a visual, not verbal, artist. She has noted that she feels books never fully exhaust her ideas.

== Reception ==
The Beauty of the Husband won Carson the T. S. Eliot Prize on her third consecutive nomination in 2001, making her the first woman to be awarded this honour. That same year, the book won the Los Angeles Times Book Prize for Poetry, and the Quebec Writers' Federation Award – A. M. Klein Prize for Poetry. It was also a finalist for the 2002 Lenore Marshall Poetry Prize.

Daphne Merkin, writing for the New York Times Book Review, called Anne Carson "one of the great pasticheurs", and said of The Beauty of the Husband: "I don’t think there has been a book since Robert Lowell's Life Studies that has advanced the art of poetry quite as radically as Anne Carson is in the process of doing".
