= Brooke Holmes =

American classicist

- Education: Columbia University (BA); Sorbonne University (MA); Princeton University (PhD)
- Occupation: Classicist
- Employer: Princeton University

Brooke Holmes is an American classicist. She is the Susan Dod Brown Professor of Classics at Princeton University. She is the author of two books, and a co-editor of a third book about Heinrich von Staden. She was awarded a Guggenheim Fellowship in 2018.

Holmes graduated magna cum laude from Columbia University in 1998, received a D.E.A. from Sorbonne University in 2002, and a PhD from Princeton University in 2005.

== Selected works ==
- Holmes, Brooke (2010). The Symptom and the Subject: The Emergence of the Physical Body in Ancient Greece. Princeton, New Jersey: Princeton University Press. ISBN 9780691138992. OCLC 429472332.
- Holmes, Brooke (2012). Gender: Antiquity and Its Legacy. Oxford, U.K.: Oxford University Press. ISBN 9780195380835. OCLC 843554986.
- Holmes, Brooke; Fischer, Klaus-Dietrich; Capettini, Emilio, eds. (2017). The Frontiers of Ancient Science: Essays in Honor of Heinrich von Staden. Berlin: De Gruyter. ISBN 9783110559224. OCLC 993649685.
