= Men in the Off Hours =

Canadian book of poetry

- Author: Anne Carson
- Language: English
- Genre: Poetry; essay; translation
- Publisher: Alfred A. Knopf
- Publication date: 2000
- Publication place: United States
- Awards: Griffin Poetry Prize
- ISBN: 9780375408045

Men in the Off Hours (2000) is a book of poems and prose pieces by Anne Carson. It won her the inaugural Griffin Poetry Prize in 2001.

== Summary ==
Men in the Off Hours is a hybrid collection of short poems, verse essays, epitaphs, commemorative prose, interviews, scripts, and translations from ancient Greek and Latin (of Alcaeus, Alcman, Catullus, Hesiod, Sappho and others). The book broke with Carson's established pattern of writing long poems.

The pieces include diverse references to writers, thinkers, and artists, as well as to historical, biblical, and mythological figures, including: Anna Akhmatova, Antigone, Aristotle, Antonin Artaud, John James Audubon, Augustine, Samuel Beckett, Beethoven, Bertolt Brecht, Brahms, Pieter Bruegel the Elder, Bei Dao, Catherine Deneuve, Jacques Derrida, René Descartes, Emily Dickinson, John Donne, George Eliot, Sigmund Freud, Giotto, Jean-Luc Godard, Maxim Gorky, Tamiki Hara, Heraclitus, Thomas Higginson, Hokusai, Homer, Edward Hopper, Karl Klaus, Lazarus, Longinus (both biblical and literary), Osip Mandelstam, Oedipus, Dorothy Parker, Ilya Repin, Rainer Maria Rilke, Satan, Socrates, Thucydides, Leo Tolstoy, and Virginia Woolf.

The title of the book is taken from a line in its opening essay, "Ordinary Time: Virginia Woolf and Thucydides on War".

Carson's interest in technical aspects of television – apparent in the collection's "TV Men" sequence – is said to have been stimulated by her work as a humanities commentator on the 1995 PBS series about Nobel laureates called The Nobel Legacy.

Men in the Off Hours includes two personal pieces about the author's parents. Carson's father Robert had Alzheimer's disease, and the poem "Father's Old Blue Cardigan" deals with his mental decline. Carson closes the collection with the prose piece "Appendix to Ordinary Time", using crossed-out phrases from the diaries and manuscripts of Virginia Woolf to craft an epitaph for her mother Margaret (1913–1997), who died during the writing of the book.

== Reception ==
Men in the Off Hours won the inaugural Griffin Poetry Prize in 2001, with the judges calling it an "ambitious collection" in which Carson "continues to redefine what a book of poetry can be".

The book also made the shortlist for the 2000 T. S. Eliot Prize (Carson's second consecutive nomination), and was a poetry finalist for both the 2000 National Book Critics Circle Award and the 2001 Governor General's Literary Award.

== Adaptations ==
The choreographer William Forsythe drew on two pieces from the collection – "Essay on What I Think About Most" and "Irony is Not Enough: Essay on My Life as Catherine Deneuve" – to create his 2000 work Kammer/Kammer, with the latter piece recited during the performance. First staged in Frankfurt (Bockenheimer Depot), the work went on to be presented in London (Sadler's Wells) in 2003, and New York (BAM) in 2006.

The Interview, a 2002 short film directed by Bruce McDonald with music by Broken Social Scene, includes dialogue adapted from Carson's "Interview with Hara Tamiki (1950)".

== Contents ==
1. "Ordinary Time: Virginia Woolf and Thucydides on War"
2. "Epitaph: Zion"
3. "First Chaldaic Oracle"
4. "New Rule"
5. "Sumptuous Destitution"
6. "Epitaph: Annunciation"
7. "Hokusai"
8. "Audubon"
9. "Epitaph: Europe"
10. "Freud (1st draft)"
11. "Lazarus (1st draft)"
12. "Flatman (1st draft)"
13. "A Station"
14. "Epitaph: Donne Clown"
15. "Flat Man (2nd draft)"
16. "Epitaph: Oedipus' Nap"
17. "Shadowboxer"
18. "Lazarus (2nd draft)"
19. "Epitaph: Evil"
20. "Essay on What I Think About Most"
21. "Essay on Error (2nd draft)"
22. "Catullus: Carmina"
23. "Interview with Hara Tamiki (1950)"
24. "Father's Old Blue Cardigan"
25. ""Why Did I Awake (Flatman 3rd draft)" [sic]
26. "Hopper: Confessions"
27. "TV Men"
  - "Sappho"
  - "Artaud"
  - "Artaud"
  - "Tolstoy"
  - "Lazarus"
  - "Antigone (Scripts 1 and 2)"
  - "Akhmatova (Treatment for a Script)"
  - "Thucydides in Conversation With Virginia Woolf on the Set of The Peloponnesian War"
  - "Sappho"
28. "Irony Is Not Enough: Essay on My Life as Catherine Deneuve (2nd draft)"
29. "Epitaph: Thaw"
30. "Freud (2nd draft)"
31. "Dirt and Desire: Essay on the Phenomenology of Female Pollution in Antiquity"
32. "No Epitaph"
33. "Appendix to Ordinary Time"
