= Eros the Bittersweet =

1986 book of criticism by Anne Carson

- Author: Anne Carson
- Language: English
- Genre: Nonfiction; criticism
- Publisher: Princeton University Press
- Publication date: 1986
- Publication place: United States
- Awards: Modern Library: 100 Best Nonfiction Books (Reader's List)
- ISBN: 9780608027401

Eros the Bittersweet: An Essay (1986) is the first book of criticism by the Canadian poet, essayist, translator, and classicist Anne Carson.

A reworking of her 1981 doctoral thesis Odi et Amo Ergo Sum ("I Hate and I Love, Therefore I Am"), Eros the Bittersweet "laid the groundwork for her subsequent publications, […] formulating the ideas on desire that would come to dominate her poetic output", and establishing her "style of patterning her writings after classical Greek literature".

== Summary ==
The book traces the concept of eros in ancient Greece through its representations in writings of the time. It examines eros as a simultaneous experience of pleasure and pain, as exemplified by a word of Sappho's creation: "glukupikron" (the "bittersweet" of the book's title).

Carson considers how triangulations of desire appear in the writings of Sappho, ancient Greek novelists (Longus, Heliodorus, Achilles Tatius, and Chariton), and Plato (in his Phaedrus). Her analysis of Sappho's Fragment 31 sees "eros as deferred, defied, obstructed, hungry, organized around a radiant absence – […] eros as lack."

== Reception ==
Acclaim for Eros the Bittersweet grew in the fifteen years after it was published in 1986: in the words of John D'Agata, the book "first stunned the classics community as a work of Greek scholarship; then it stunned the nonfiction community as an inspired return to the lyrically based essays once produced by Seneca, Montaigne, and Emerson; and then, and only then, deep into the 1990s, reissued as 'literature' and redesigned for an entirely new audience, it finally stunned the poets."

By the turn of the millennium, Eros the Bittersweet had also entered into the popular consciousness, voted onto the 1999 Modern Library Reader's List for the 100 Best Nonfiction books of the 20th century, and mentioned (along with Autobiography of Red) in a 2004 episode of the television series The L Word.
