= Quarterly Review of Literature =

- Categories: literary magazine
- Frequency: Quarterly
- Founder: Theodore Weiss and Warren Pendleton Carrier
- Founded: 1943
- Final issue: 1999
- Country: United States
- Based in: Princeton, New Jersey
- Language: English
- ISSN: 0033-5819

The Quarterly Review of Literature (QRL) was an American literary magazine founded in 1943 by the poet Theodore (Ted) Weiss (1916–2003) and then Spanish teacher Warren Pendleton Carrier (1918–2009). In 1944, Weiss's wife—Renée Karol Weiss (born 1923), a violinist and, later, an author of children's books—replaced Carrier when he entered the military. The Review showcased emerging and major writers including William Carlos Williams, Wallace Stevens, E. E. Cummings, Thomas Merton, Mark Van Doren, Ezra Pound, Henry Miller, and Jean-Paul Sartre, the quarterly is credited with reviving interest in poets who were out of literary fashion, and introducing some that were not widely known to Americans, including Franz Kafka and Eugenio Montale.

== History ==
Poets Theodore Weiss and Warren Carrier published the first issue of the Review, Volume 1, Issue 1, while teaching at the University of North Carolina at Chapel Hill in the Fall 1943 (December 17, 1943). Renée Weiss, who married Theodore in 1940, replaced Carrier the following year. Renée, like Theodore, had grown up in Allentown, Pennsylvania. The Review followed Theodore Weiss throughout his teaching career, moving to Yale in 1966, Bard College in 1948, and Princeton in 1966. From 1944 to 1999, as a team, Theodore Weiss handled the poems and Renee Weiss handled prose and business.

Entire issues of the Review had been devoted to poetry, or a neglected writer, or foreign writers who had not been translated in this country. The Review published articles by Kafka that had never before been translated. Prior to 1985, two of the four quarterly issues were devoted to prose and two issues to poetry. But because the Weisses worried about poets, they decided to publish only poetry.

The final Volumes, Nos. 37 and 38, were published in 1999. The publication archives, including manuscripts and correspondence, are held at the Princeton University Library.

== Publication codes ==
- ISSN 0033-5819 (International Standard Serial Number)
