= Geryoneis =

Ancient Greek poem by Stesichorus

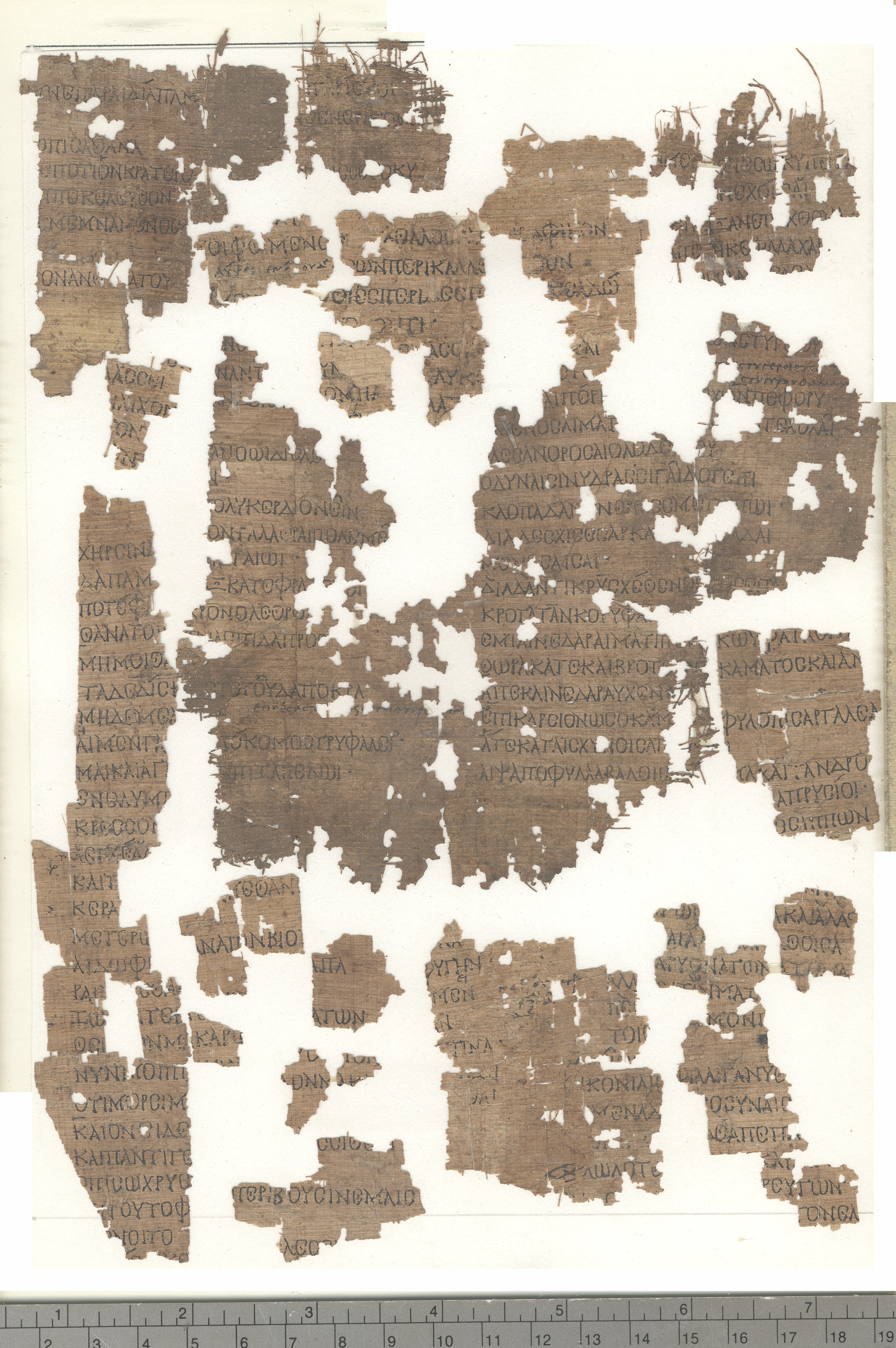
The fragments of the "Geryoneis" on Papyrus Oxyrhynchus XXXII 2617

The "Geryoneis" is a fragmentary poem, written in Ancient Greek by the lyric poet Stesichorus. Composed in the 6th century BC, it narrates an episode from the Heracles myth in which the hero steals the cattle of Geryon, a three-bodied monster with a human face.

== Preservation ==
The text of the "Geryoneis" has only been handed down in fragmentary form. The majority of which comes from Papyrus Oxyrhynchus XXXII 2617, which was published in 1967. Additional fragments can be found in Book 11 of Athenaeus' Deipnosophistae. The extant parts of the poem exhibit numerous lacunae, with only fragment 19 (= 15 SLG) displaying long stretches of uninterrupted text. The length of the complete poem is estimated to 1300 lines.

== Synopsis ==
The extant parts of the poem begin with the prelude of the fight between Heracles and Geryon. They include: a council of the gods, which resolves that Geryon is to die, the birth of his cowherd Eurytion and a depiction of his parents, trying to convince him not to face Heracles. The final moments of the conflict are preserved at length: Heracles shoots a deadly arrow into Geryon's forehead. His agony is described in detail and compared to a withering poppy.

== Reception ==
Like much of Stesichorus' output, the "Geryoneis" has been noted for its use and advancement of Homeric elements. Especially the humanisation of Geryon through the mention of his parents and the poppy simile has been highlighted by critics.

In 1998, Canadian poet Anne Carson published the verse novel Autobiography of Red, a modern interpretation of Gerioneida.
