= Nina Baym =

American literary critic (1936 – 2018)

- Born: Nina Zippin; June 14, 1936
- Died: June 15, 2018 (aged 82)
- Education: Cornell University, BA in 1957; Radcliffe, MA in 1958; Harvard University, PhD in 1963
- Occupations: Literary critic Professor of English literature
- Known for: The Norton Anthology of American Literature; American Women Writers and the Work of History

Nina Baym (née Zippin; 1936–2018) was an American literary critic and literary historian. She was professor of English at the University of Illinois at Urbana-Champaign from 1963 to 2004.

Baym was born in Princeton, New Jersey; her father was the mathematician Leo Zippin, known for his work on topological groups. Her mother taught high English literature at the secondary school level. She received her B.A. from Cornell University, an M.A. from Radcliffe, and a Ph.D. from Harvard University.

She served as Director of the School of Humanities at the University of Illinois from 1976 to 1987.

Before her retirement at the University of Illinois, Baym was a Swanlund Endowed Chair, a Jubilee Professor of Liberal Arts & Sciences and a Center of Advanced Study Professor of English. Her work in US literary criticism and history is widely credited with expanding the field to include women writers while taking the focus off "great" writers according to a supposed unchanging value judgment and placing it instead on the dynamics of literary professionalism. She is the author or editor of a number of groundbreaking works of American literary history and criticism, beginning with Woman's Fiction (Cornell, 1978), and including Feminism and American Literary History (Rutgers, 1992), American Women Writers and the Work of History (Rutgers, 1995), and American Women of Letters and the Nineteenth-Century Sciences (Rutgers, 2004). She is also the author of scores of articles, reviews, and essays including "Melodramas of Beset Manhood: How Theories of American Fiction Exclude Women Authors" (American Quarterly 1981). Elaine Showalter called Baym's Women Writers of the American West, 1833-1927 (2011), "the first comprehensive guide to women's writing in the old West," an immediately "standard and classic text." This book uncovers and describes the western-themed writing in diverse genres of almost 350 American women, most of them unknown today but many of them successful and influential in their own time. Since 1991 Baym has served as General Editor of The Norton Anthology of American Literature.

In October 2013 she was recognized by the college of Liberal Arts and Sciences in connection with the 100th anniversary of the college; she was designated as one of the 25 most influential people in the college's history. She has been active in such professional associations as the American Literature Section of the Modern Language Association and the American Studies Association. She has served on panels for the National Endowment for the Humanities and the Fulbight Foundation. Among her numerous literary prizes, fellowship, and honors are the 2000 Jay B. Hubbell Award for lifetime achievement in American literary studies (from the Modern Language Association) and fellowships from the John Simon Guggenheim Foundation, the National Endowment for the Humanities, the American Association of University Women, and the Mellon Foundation.

She was married to Gordon Baym from 1958 to 1970; their two children are Nancy Baym and Geoffrey Baym. She was married to Jack Stillinger from 1971 to her death.

== Books authored or edited ==
- 1976: Shape of Hawthorne's Career. Cornell University Press
- 1978: Woman's Fiction. Cornell University Press
- 1992: Feminism and American Literary History: Essays. Rutgers
- 1995: American Women Writers and the Work of History. Rutgers
- 1985: Norton Anthology of American Literature, 3rd through 8th editions. W. W. Norton
- 2002: American Women of Letters and the Nineteenth-Century Sciences. Rutgers
- 2011: Women Writers of the American West, 1833-1927, Illinois
