= The Norton Anthology of American Literature =

- Editor: Robert S. Levine
- Language: English
- Genre: Anthology, American literature
- Published: 1979
- Publisher: W. W. Norton & Company
- Publication place: United States

The Norton Anthology of American Literature is a compendium of various works by authors of specifically American birth or naturalization, ranging from short poems, pamphlets, and novellas to longer entries such as entire novels and philosophical pieces.

This collection proceeded from a series of other anthologies including English Literature and Poetry. It was first published in 1979 by W. W. Norton & Company and is notable for the series' 2003 Shorter Sixth Edition.

The current general editor of the series is literary scholar Robert S. Levine of the University of Maryland, College Park.
