= Boundary 2 =

- Discipline: Literature
- Language: English
- Edited by: Paul A. Bové

Publication details
- History: 1972–present
- Publisher: Duke University Press (United States)
- Frequency: Triannually
- Impact factor: 0.1 (2022)

Standard abbreviations
- ISO 4: Bound. 2

Indexing
- ISSN: 0190-3659 (print); 1527-2141 (web)
- LCCN: 72626433
- JSTOR: 01903659
- OCLC no.: 1408678

Links
- Journal homepage; Online access at Project MUSE; Journal page at publisher's website

Boundary 2, often stylized boundary 2, is a quarterly peer-reviewed academic journal of postmodern theory, literature, and culture. Established in 1972 by William V. Spanos and Robert Kroetsch (Binghamton University), under the title boundary 2, a journal of postmodern literature, the journal moved to Duke University Press in the late 1980s and is now edited by Paul A. Bové (University of Pittsburgh).

Since the early 2000s the journal has been closed to unsolicited submissions. This policy was described by Jeffrey Williams, editor of Minnesota Review, as one that "seems a little too closed, and would go in the opposite direction of taking chances". In contrast, the editors note that "instead [we] will publish only material that identifies and analyzes the tyrannies of thought and action spreading around the world and that suggests alternatives to these emerging configurations of power." boundary 2 has published special issues focusing on postmodernism in individual countries such as Greece or Canada, as well as a book of articles previously published in the journal. In an interview published in the Minnesota Review, Spanos discusses the history of the journal, its financial and editorial problems, and the motivations for various changes over the years, including the journal's practice of publishing articles by invitation only, refusing unsolicited submissions.

The Boundary 2 editorial collective also publishes an online-only, open access peer-reviewed journal called b2o: an online journal, which appears two or three times each year.

== Abstracting and indexing ==
The journal is abstracted and indexed in:

- Academic Search Elite
- Academic Search Premier
- Arts and Humanities Citation Index
- Current Contents/Arts and Humanities
- Current Contents/ Social & Behavioral Sciences
- Expanded Academic ASAP
- EBSCO databases
- International Bibliography of Periodical Literature
- MLA Bibliography
- Scopus
- Social Sciences Citation Index
- Sociological Abstracts

According to the Journal Citation Reports, the journal has a 2022 impact factor of 0.1.
