= Michael Sprinker =

American academic (1950–1999)

Michael Sprinker (8 February 1950 in Elgin, Illinois – 12 August 1999) was a literary critic known for his writings on Louis Althusser, Walter Benjamin and Bertolt Brecht, among others, as well as for his editorial work at Verso, Cambridge University Press, the New Left Review and The Minnesota Review. With Mike Davis, Sprinker co-founded Verso's Haymarket series and was said to have guided it until his death. He also taught at Oregon State University and the State University of New York at Stony Brook.

== Bibliography ==
- "A Counterpoint of Dissonance": The Aesthetics and Poetry of Gerard Manley Hopkins (Johns Hopkins UP, 1980)
- History and Ideology in Proust: A la recherche du temps perdu and the Third French Republic (Cambridge UP, 1994)
- Imaginary Relations: Aesthetics and Ideology in the Theory of Historical Materialism (Verso, 1987)
- A Singular Voice: Collected Writings of Michael Sprinker ed. Aijaz Ahmad, Fred Pfeil and Modhumita Roy (ISBN 1-85984-313-1)
- Jacques Derrida: Politique et amitié : Entretiens avec Michael Sprinker sur Marx et Althusser, Paris: Editions Galilée, 2011, ISBN 2-7186-0841-2

=== As editor ===
- The Althusserian Legacy
- Edward Said: A Critical Reader
- Ghostly Demarcations
