= Roger Mitchell =

Roger Mitchell or Michell may refer to:

== Film and TV ==
- Roger Michell, English film director
- E. Roger Mitchell (born 1971), American actor

== Others ==
- Roger Mitchell, an accountant who co-founded Marwick, Mitchell & Co., one of the predecessor firms to KPMG
- Roger Mitchell (editor) of The Minnesota Review
- Roger Mitchell, see History of tuberculosis
- Roger Michell (MP) for Derbyshire (UK Parliament constituency)
- Roger A. Mitchell Jr., 126th president of the National Medical Association
