= The Norton Anthology of Theory and Criticism =

Literature anthology

- (Cover of third edition)
- Language: English
- Genre: Anthology, literary theory, literary criticism
- Published: 2001
- Publisher: W. W. Norton & Company
- Publication place: United States
- Pages: 2848
- ISBN: 978-0393974294

The Norton Anthology of Theory & Criticism (NATC) is an anthology of literary theory and criticism written in or translated to English that is published by the W. W. Norton & Company, one of several such compendiums. The first edition was published in 2001, with a second edition published in 2010 and a third in 2018. Texts range from the 5th century BCE to the present day.

== Publication and Uses of the Anthology ==
The general editor of the anthology, Vincent B. Leitch, a professor of English at the University of Oklahoma, managed a six-year development process as the head of a team including William E. Cain, Laurie A. Finke, Barbara E. Johnson, John McGowan, and Jeffrey J. Williams.

The text was first published in June 2001. In its first year, it sold 15,000 copies and received 350 adoptions by courses. Literary theory scholar Jonathan Culler, called it "the most comprehensive collection around" in 2003, but noted that its length (2,624 pages), range (from BCE to the 21st century), and weight (1.94 kg) suggested it may be more useful subdivided by time periods. David Richter, adding to the discussion after the publication of the NATC, details the extended process of creating the anthology ("conceived before 1989," more than a decade before it would be published) along with other controversies reflecting that it was "a product of a culture industry attempting to establish the canon of theory," which resulted in decisions based in considerations of market, contributions by editor, and budget.

As the anthology was published in updated editions (the second in 2010 and the third in 2018), scholars continued to debate the attention given to subtopics within critical theory. For example, Steven Mailloux, in 2020, noted that while the NATC includes rhetoric in its definition of topics within literary theory, "the most important rhetorical theorist of the twentieth century, Kenneth Burke, ... continues to be absent in the 2018 third edition." By 2024, the anthology is still in its third edition, and Open Syllabus Analytics report its use in 419 syllabi worldwide.

== Contents ==
The anthology is organized by author, the order being determined by their birth year. Most inclusions are essays or book chapters, and some authors have several works listed. The following is a list of authors represented in the anthology's third edition.

- Gorgias of Leontini
- Plato
- Aristotle
- Horace
- Longinus
- Augustine of Hippo
- Moses Maimonides
- Thomas Aquinas
- Dante Alighieri
- Giovanni Boccaccio
- Christine de Pizan
- Joachim du Bellay
- Giacopo Mazzoni
- Sir Philip Sidney
- Pierre Corneille
- John Dryden
- Baruch Spinoza
- Aphra Behn
- Giambattista Vico
- Joseph Addison
- Alexander Pope
- Samuel Johnson
- David Hume
- Immanuel Kant
- Edmund Burke
- Gotthold Ephraim Lessing
- Friedrich von Schiller
- Mary Wollstonecraft
- Germaine Necker de Staël
- Friedrich Schleiermacher
- Georg Wilhelm Friedrich Hegel
- William Wordsworth
- Samuel Taylor Coleridge
- Percy Bysshe Shelley
- Ralph Waldo Emerson
- Edgar Allan Poe
- Karl Marx and Friedrich Engels
- Matthew Arnold
- Walter Pater
- Henry James
- Friedrich Nietzsche
- Oscar Wilde
- Sigmund Freud
- Ferdinand de Saussure
- W. E. B. Du Bois
- Virginia Woolf
- György Lukács
- T. S. Eliot
- John Crowe Ransom
- Martin Heidegger
- Antonio Gramsci
- Zora Neale Hurston
- Erich Auerbach
- Walter Benjamin
- Mikhail M. Bakhtin
- Max Horkheimer and Theodor W. Adorno
- F. R. Leavis
- Roman Jakobson
- Friedrich A. Hayek
- Leo Strauss
- Jacques Lacan
- Langston Hughes
- Lionel Trilling
- Hannah Arendt
- Cleanth Brooks
- William K. Wimsatt Jr. and Monroe C. Beardsley
- Simone de Beauvoir
- Claude Lévi-Strauss
- J. L. Austin
- Northrop Frye
- Roland Barthes
- Louis Althusser
- Paul de Man
- C. D. Narasimhaiah
- Raymond Williams
- Frantz Fanon
- Gilles Deleuze and Félix Guattari
- Jean-François Lyotard
- Michel Foucault
- Wolfgang Iser
- Hayden White
- Jean Baudrillard
- Jürgen Habermas
- Adrienne Rich
- Chinua Achebe
- Adūnīs
- Harold Bloom
- Pierre Bourdieu
- Jacques Derrida
- Li Zehou
- Toni Morrison
- Richard Ohmann
- Stuart Hall
- Susan Sontag
- Fredric Jameson
- David Harvey
- Edward W. Said
- Monique Wittig
- Benedict Anderson
- Sandra M. Gilbert and Susan Gubar
- E. Ann Kaplan
- Hélène Cixous
- Gerald Graff
- Stanley E. Fish
- Ngugi wă Thiong'o, Taban Lo Liyong, and Henry Owuor-Anyumba
- Tzvetan Todorov
- Karatani Kōjin
- Julia Kristeva
- Laura Mulvey
- Giorgio Agamben
- Gloria Anzaldúa
- Gayatri Chakravorty Spivak
- Terry Eagleton
- Stephen J. Greenblatt
- Donna Haraway
- N. Katherine Hayles
- Susan Bordo
- Bruno Latour
- Martha C. Nussbaum
- Homi K. Bhabha
- Lennard J. Davis
- Gayle Rubin
- Slavoj Žižek
- Henry Louis Gates Jr.
- Franco Moretti
- Eve Kosofsky Sedgwick
- Hamid Dabashi
- Dick Hebdige
- bell hooks
- Rosi Braidotti
- Rob Nixon
- Judith Butler
- Paul Gilroy
- Andrew Ross
- Jane Bennett
- Lauren Berlant and Michael Warner
- Rey Chow
- Kenneth W. Warren
- Kelly Oliver
- Michael Hardt and Antonio Negri
- Judith Jack Halberstam
- David Herman
- Marc Bousquet
- Mark McGurl
- Stephen Best and Sharon Marcus
- Timothy Morton
- Alondra Nelson
- Sianne Ngai
- Ian Bogost
