= Sage (poetry collection) =

Poetry collection by Marilyn Chin

- Author: Marilyn Chin
- Genre: Poetry
- Publisher: W. W. Norton & Company
- Publication date: May 2, 2023
- Pages: 110
- ISBN: 978-1-324-05015-5

Sage is a 2023 poetry collection by Marilyn Chin, published by W. W. Norton & Company.

== Form ==
Chin's sixth collection addresses a litany of issues including the COVID-19 pandemic, the concurrent rise in violence against Asian Americans, and the means of social justice through forms like ranging from ekphrasis to satire.

In an interview with the Poetry Society of America, Chin described the collection as "peopled with strong female voices — from a Yuan Dynasty poetess who was ransomed by a 'barbarian king,' to suffragettes who marched to the U.S. capitol." In Poetry International Online, she discussed the book's experimentation with form, as well as the influence of both classical Chinese poetry and hip-hop.

In the Oxford Review of Books, Chin described her poetics as inseparable from her identity, saying "my skin colour, my biology, my experience as a minority person bullied by the dominant society—all are integral to the work."

== Critical reception ==
Literary Hub called the book a "sharp-witted and fresh sixth collection" that "speaks to the current moment with the gravitas, humor, and bite missing from many a pandemic-born collection."

Alta Journal praised Chin for "bend[ing] the rules to her advantage," specifically lauding her poetic subjects "about identity, life, death, conflict, and art."

The Rocky Mountain Review stated, "Tapping into her scholarship and knowledge of Chinese and Japanese poetry, Chin dazzles her readers with her ability to draw upon diverse traditions" and observed Chin's use of ancient religion and spirituality to interrogate questions about womanhood.
