= The Notebooks of Malte Laurids Brigge =

1910 novel by Rainer Maria Rilke

- Penguin Classics edition
- Author: Rainer Maria Rilke
- Original title: Die Aufzeichnungen des Malte Laurids Brigge
- Translator: M. D. Herter Norton
- Language: German
- Genre: Expressionist novel
- Publisher: Insel Verlag
- Publication date: 1910
- Publication place: Austria-Hungary
- Pages: Two volumes; 191 and 186 p. respectively (first edition hardcover)

The Notebooks of Malte Laurids Brigge, first published as The Journal of My Other Self, is a 1910 novel by Austrian poet Rainer Maria Rilke. The novel was the only work of prose of considerable length that he wrote and published. It is semiautobiographical and is written in an expressionistic style, with existentialist themes. It was conceptualized and written while Rilke lived in Paris, mainly inspired by Sigbjørn Obstfelder's A Priest's Diary and Jens Peter Jacobsen's Niels Lyhne.

== English translations ==
- John Linton (Norton, 1930; Hogarth Press, 1930). Originally published under the title The Journal of My Other Self.
- Mary D. Herter Norton (Norton, 1949)
- Stephen Mitchell (Random House, 1982)
- Burton Pike (Dalkey Archive, 2008)
- Michael Hulse (Penguin, 2009)
- Robert Vilain (Oxford, 2016)
- Edward Snow (Norton, 2022)

== See also ==
- Le Monde's 100 Books of the Century
- Raffaello Baldini – Romagnol poet who counted the novel among his influences
