= Norton Anthology of Literature by Women =

The Norton Anthology of Literature by Women: The Traditions in English, published by W. W. Norton & Company, is one of the Norton Anthology series for use in English literary studies. It is edited by Sandra Gilbert and Susan Gubar. This volume is dedicated to exploring the history of English-speaking women's involvement in the literary world, the traditions of which women writers have been a part, and the experiences women share, with the second and third edition giving more emphasis to how those experiences are shaped by differing cultural, racial, religious, socioeconomical, and sexual backgrounds. The first edition was published in 1985. Norton released the third edition in February 2007, expanding the new edition into a two-volume set along with a companion reader. Additional material added sixty-one additional authors to the anthology, bringing the total to 219. The additional material expanded on the interest in current women's literature scholarship in the effects of diverse backgrounds on women's experiences.

== Included authors (third edition) ==
=== Literature of the Middle Ages and the Renaissance ===
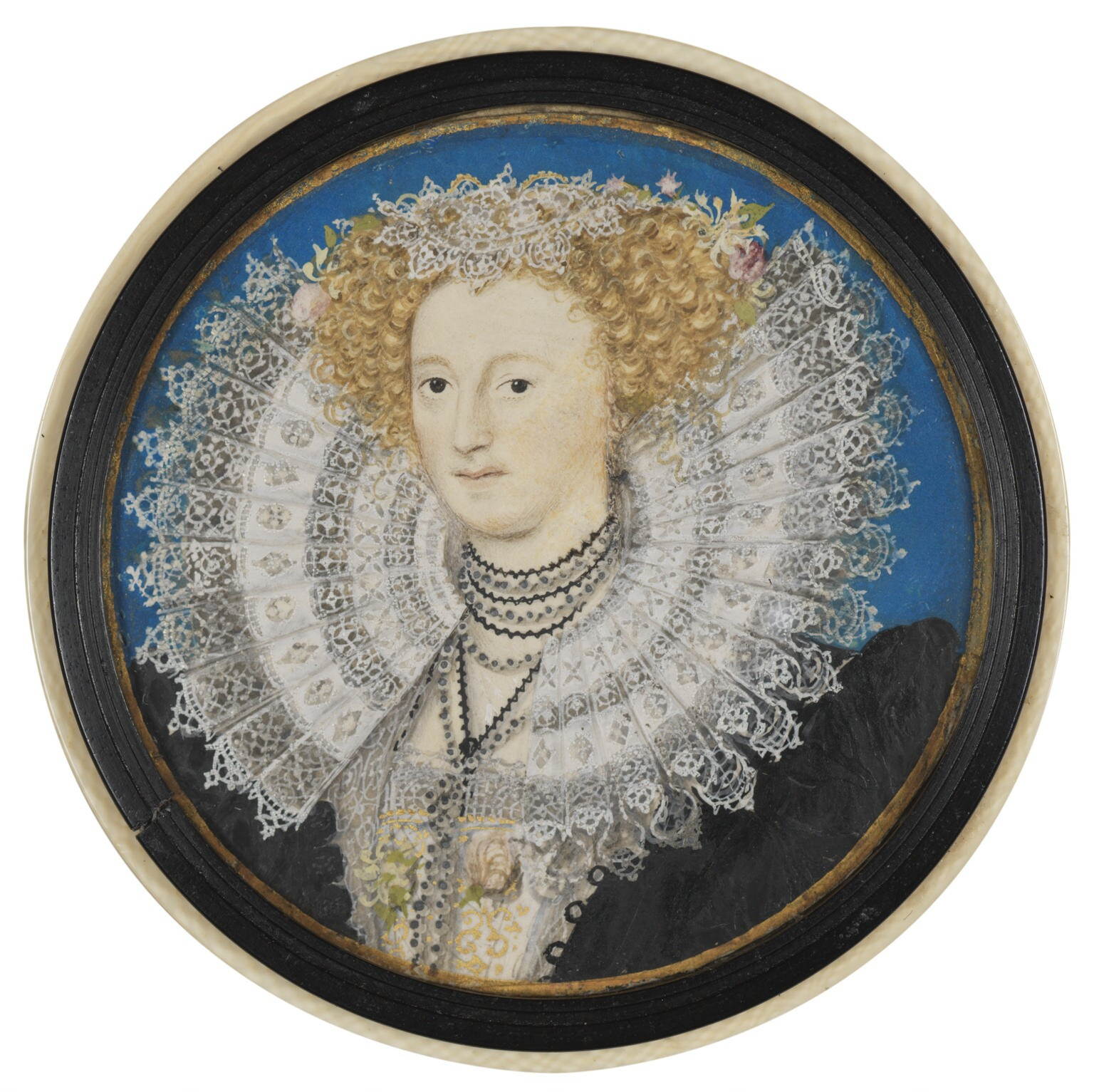
Portrait of Mary Herbert née Sidney, by Nicholas Hilliard, c. 1590

- Marie de France (fl. 1170?)
- Julian of Norwich (1342–c. 1416)
- Margery Kempe (c. 1372–1438)
- Juliana Berners (born c. 1388)
- Anne Askew (1521–1546)
- Queen Elizabeth I (1533–1603)
- Mary Sidney Herbert, Countess of Pembroke (1562–1621)
- Isabella Whitney (fl. 1567–1573)
- Aemilia Lanyer (1569–1645)
- Martha Moulsworth (1577–1646)
- Elizabeth Cary (1585–1639)
- Mary Wroth (c. 1587—1651/53)
- Rachel Speght (c. 1597–16??)

=== Literature of the seventeenth and eighteenth centuries ===
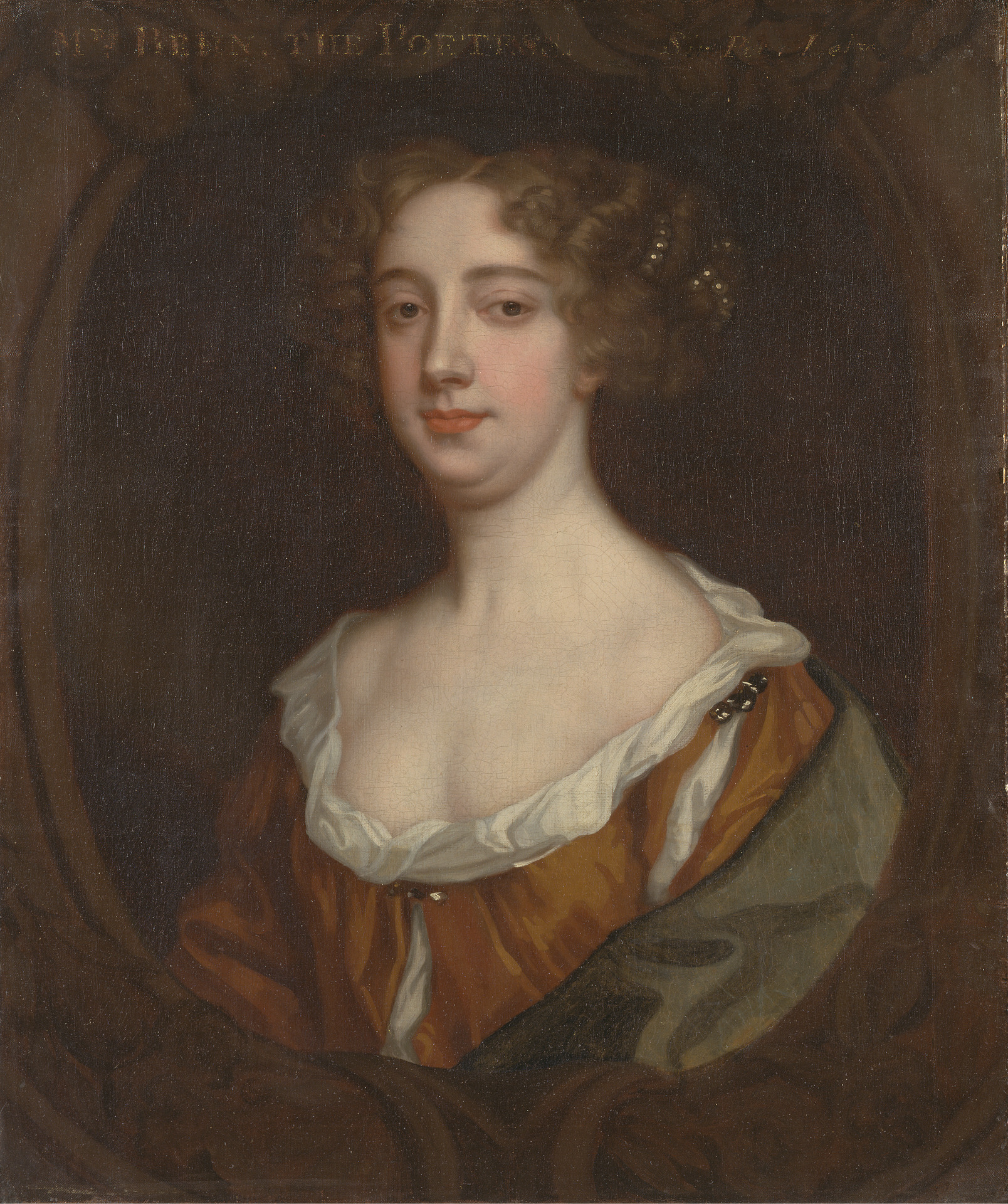
Portrait of Aphra Behn by Sir Peter Lely

- Anne Bradstreet (1612–1672)
- Margaret Cavendish, Duchess of Newcastle (1623–1673)
- Jane Lead (1624–1704)
- Katherine Philips (1632–1664)
- Mary Rowlandson (c. 1636–1711)
- Aphra Behn (1640–1689)
- Lady Mary Chudleigh (1656–1710)
- Anne Killigrew (1660–1685)
- Anne Finch, Countess of Winchilsea (1661–1720)
- Sarah Kemble Knight (1666–1727)
- Mary Astell (1666–1731)
- Lady Mary Wortley Montagu (1689–1762)
- Eliza Haywood (c. 1693 – 1756)
- Anne Ingram, Viscountess Irwin (c. 1696 – 1764)
- Mary Leapor (1722–1746)
- Lucy Terry (c. 1724–1821)
- Mary Alcock (1742–1798)
- Anna Letitia Barbauld (1743–1825)
- Abigail Adams (1744–1818)
- Hannah More (1745–1833)
- Charlotte Smith (1749–1806)
- Judith Sargent Murray (1751–1820)
- Frances Burney (1752–1840)
- Phillis Wheatley (c. 1753–1784)
- Mary Robinson (1748–1800)
- Mary Wollstonecraft (1759–1797)
- Sarah Wentworth Morton (1759–1846)
- Helen Maria Williams (c. 1762–1827)
- Joanna Baillie (1762–1851)

=== Literature of the nineteenth century ===
Portrait of Mary Shelley but Richard Rothwell

- Maria Edgeworth (1768–1849)
- Dorothy Wordsworth (1771–1855)
- Jane Austen (1773–1817)
- Felicia Dorothea Hemans (1793–1835)
- Rebecca Cox Jackson (1795–1871)
- Mary Shelley (1797–1851)
- Sojourner Truth (c. 1797–1883)
- Letitia Elizabeth Landon ("L.E.L.") (1802–1838)
- Elizabeth Barrett Browning (1806–1861)
- Margaret Fuller (1810–1850)
- Elizabeth Cleghorn Gaskell (1810–1865)
- Fanny Fern (Sara Willis Parton) (1811–1872)
- Harriet Beecher Stowe (1811–1896)
- Harriet Jacobs (c. 1813–1897)
- Elizabeth Cady Stanton (1815–1902)
- Charlotte Brontë (1816–1855)
- Emily Brontë (1818–1848)
- George Eliot (1819–1880)
- Florence Nightingale (1820–1910)
- Frances E. W. Harper (1825–1911)
- Harriet E. Adams Wilson (c. 1828–c. 1870)
- Emily Dickinson (1830–1886)
- Christina Rossetti (1830–1894)
- Rebecca Harding Davis (1831–1910)
- Louisa May Alcott (1832–1888)
- Adah Isaacs Menken (1835–1868)

=== Turn-of-the-century literature ===
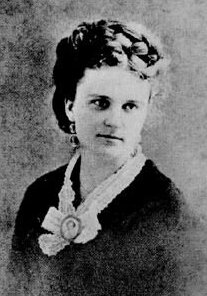
Kate Chopin

- Sarah Morgan Bryan Piatt (1836–1919)
- Augusta Webster (1837–1894)
- Constance Fenimore Woolson (1840–1894)
- Michael Field (Katherine Bradley (1846–1914) and Edith Cooper (1862–1913))
- Alice Meynell (1847–1922)
- Alice James (1848–1892)
- Emma Lazarus (1849–1887)
- Sarah Orne Jewett (1849–1909)
- Kate Chopin (1850–1904)
- Mary E. Wilkins Freeman (1852–1930)
- Olive Schreiner (1855–1920)
- Anna Julia Cooper (1858?-1964)
- Pauline Hopkins (1859–1930)
- Charlotte Perkins Gilman (1860–1935)
- Amy Levy (1861–1889)
- Mary Elizabeth Coleridge (1861–1907)
- E. Pauline Johnson (Tekahionwake) (1861–1913)

=== Early twentieth-century literature ===
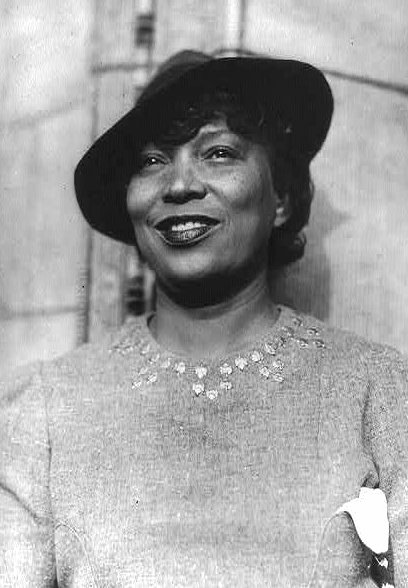
Zora Neale Hurston

- Edith Wharton (1862–1937)
- Sui Sin Far (Edith Maud Eaton) (1865–1914)
- Mary Austin (1868–1934)
- Charlotte Mew (1869–1928)
- Henry Handel Richardson (1870–1946)
- Willa Cather (1873–1947)
- Dorothy Richardson (1873–1957)
- Amy Lowell (1874–1925)
- Gertrude Stein (1874–1946)
- Alice Dunbar-Nelson (1875–1935)
- Anna Hempstead Branch (1875–1937)
- Gertrude Bonnin (Zitkala Sa) (1876–1938)
- Susan Glaspell (1876–1948)
- Radclyffe Hall (1880–1943)
- Anzia Yezierska (c. 1880?–1970)
- Virginia Woolf (1882–1941)
- Mina Loy (1882–1966)
- Anne Spencer (1882–1975)
- Katherine Susannah Prichard (1882–1969)
- Anna Wickham (Edith Alice Mary Harper) (1884–1947)
- Elinor Wylie (1885–1928)
- Isak Dinesen (1885–1962)
- H.D. (Hilda Doolittle) (1886–1961)
- Edith Sitwell (1887–1964)
- Marianne Moore (1887–1972)
- Katherine Mansfield (1888–1923)
- Katherine Anne Porter (c. 1890–1980)
- Zora Neale Hurston (1891–1960)
- Nella Larsen (1891–1964)
- Edna St. Vincent Millay (1892–1950)
- Djuna Barnes (1892–1982)
- Rebecca West (1892–1983)
- Dorothy Parker (1892–1967)
- Genevieve Taggard (1894–1948)
- Jean Rhys (1894? – 1979)
- Louise Bogan (1897–1970)
- Kate O'Brien (1897–1974)
- Ruth Pitter (1897–1992)
- Marita Bonner (1899–1971)
- Elizabeth Bowen (1899–1973)
- Meridel Le Sueur (1900–1996)
- Laura Riding (1901–1991)

=== Later twentieth-century literature ===
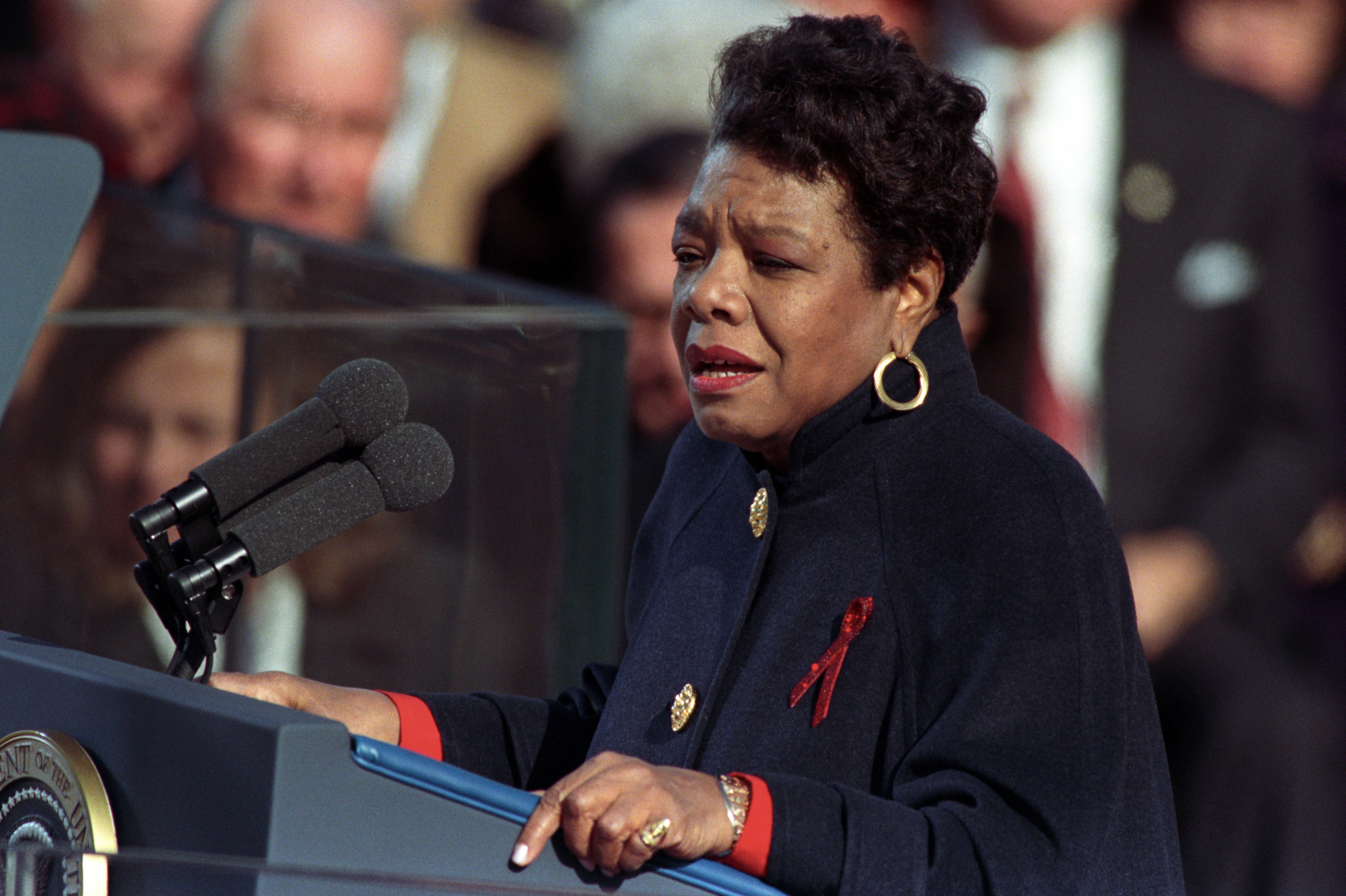
Maya Angelou reciting her poem "On the Pulse of Morning" at President Bill Clinton's inauguration

- Stevie Smith (1902–1972)
- Anaïs Nin (1903–1977)
- Dilys Laing (1906–1960)
- Dorothy Livesay (1909–1996)
- Eudora Welty (1909–2001)
- Elizabeth Bishop (1911–1979)
- Mary Lavin (1912–1996)
- Mary McCarthy (1912–1989)
- May Sarton (1912–1995)
- Muriel Rukeyser (1913–1980)
- May Swenson (1913–1989)
- Tillie Olsen (1912–2007)
- James Tiptree Jr. (Alice B. Sheldon) (1915–1987)
- Ruth Stone (1915–2011)
- Margaret Walker (1915–1998)
- Judith Wright (1915–2000)
- P. K. Page (1916–2010)
- Carson McCullers (1917–1967)
- Gwendolyn Brooks (1917–2000)
- Muriel Spark (1918–2006)
- Louise Bennett (1919–2006)
- Doris Lessing (1919–2013)
- Patricia Beer (1919–1999)
- Oodgeroo Noonuccal (Kath Walker) (1920–1993)
- Gwen Harwood (1920–1995)
- Hisaye Yamamoto (1921–2011)
- Mavis Gallant (1922–2014)
- Grace Paley (1922–2007)
- Denise Levertov (1923–1997)
- Nadine Gordimer (1923–2014)
- Shirley Kaufman (1923–2016)
- Janet Frame (1924–2004)
- Flannery O'Conner (1925–1964)
- Carolyn Kizer (1925–2014)
- Maxine W. Kumin (1925–2014)
- Anne Sexton (1928–1974)
- Maya Angelou (1928–2014)
- Cynthia Ozick (born 1928)
- U. A. Fanthorpe (1929–2009)
- Ursula K. Le Guin (1929–2018)
- Paule Marshall (1929–2019)
- Adrienne Rich (1929–2012)
- Toni Morrison (1931–2019)
- Alice Munro (1931–2024)
- Sylvia Plath (1932–1963)
- Edna O'Brien (1932–2024)
- Audre Lorde (1934–1992)
- Fleur Adcock (1934–2024)
- Diane di Prima (1934–2020)
- June Jordan (1936–2002)
- A. S. Byatt (1936–2023)
- Lucille Clifton (1936–2010)
- Anita Desai (born 1937)
- Caryl Churchill (born 1938)
- Joyce Carol Oates (born 1938)
- Margaret Atwood (born 1939)
- Angela Carter (1940–1992)
- Maxine Hong Kingston (born 1940)
- Bharati Mukherjee (1940–2017)
- Ama Ata Aidoo (1940–2023)
- Lyn Hejinian (1941–2024)
- Gloria Anzaldúa (1942–2004)
- Marilyn Hacker (born 1942)
- Sharon Olds (born 1942)
- Louise Glück (1943–2023)
- Eavan Boland (1944–2020)
- Buchi Emecheta (1944–2017)
- Alice Walker (born 1944)
- Lynn Freed (born 1945)
- Octavia Butler (1947–2006)
- Lorna Goodison (born 1947)
- Leslie Marmon Silko (born 1948)
- Jamaica Kincaid (born 1949)
- Julia Alvarez (born 1950)
- Anne Carson (born 1950)
- Carolyn Forché (born 1950)
- Medbh McGuckian (born 1950)
- Grace Nichols (born 1950)
- Jorie Graham (born 1951)
- Joy Harjo (born 1951)
- Rita Dove (born 1952)
- Luci Tapahonso (born 1953)
- Kim Addonizio (born 1954)
- Sandra Cisneros (born 1954)
- Helena María Viramontes (born 1954)
- Marilyn Chin (born 1955)
- Carol Ann Duffy (born 1955)
- Paula Meehan (born 1955)
- Rebecca Brown (born 1956)
- Gish Jen (born 1956)
- Jeanette Winterson (born 1959)
- Margaret Edson (born 1961)
- Jackie Kay (born 1961)
- Jhumpa Lahiri (born 1967)

== Authors from previous editions ==
The following authors have been included in previous editions, but are not included in the third.

- Delarivier Manley (c. 1663 – 1724)
- Lady Augusta Gregory (1852–1932)
- May Sinclair (1863–1946)
- M. F. K. Fisher (1908–1992)
- Kamala Das (1934–2009)
- Bessie Head (1937–1986)
- Annie Dillard (born 1945)
- Lorna Dee Cervantes (born 1954)
- Louise Erdrich (born 1954)
- Cathy Song (born 1955)
