= Dear elia: Letters from the Asian American Abyss =

2024 book by Mimi Khúc

dear elia: Letters from the Asian American Abyss
- Cover
- Author: Mimi Khúc
- Language: English
- Genre: Non-fiction, Asian American studies, disability studies
- Publisher: Duke University Press
- Publication date: March 2024
- Publication place: United States
- Pages: 272
- Awards: The Association for Asian American Studies (AAAS) 2026 Book Award for Outstanding Contribution in the Interdisciplinary/Multidisciplinary category
- ISBN: 978-1-4780-2567-2
- Website: www.mimikhuc.com/projects/dear-elia

dear elia: Letters from the Asian American Abyss is a 2024 non-fiction book by writer and scholar Mimi Khúc. Khúc combines memoir, critical university studies, and disability studies to develop a new approach to mental health, with a special focus on Asian American communities. Structured as a series of letters addressed to various audiences including the author's daughter, Elia, as well as to students and colleagues, the book critiques psychiatric frameworks that treat mental illness as individual pathology and instead positions unwellness as an inevitable response to structural conditions. The book won the Association for Asian American Studies (AAAS) 2026 Book Award for Outstanding Contribution in the Interdisciplinary/Multidisciplinary category.

== Author ==
Khúc is a Vietnamese American scholar, writer, and adjunct professor. In dear elia and in many talks since its publication. She explained that the book grew out of her earlier mental health project, Open in Emergency, a hybrid book-arts project she co-created with her partner Lawrence-Minh Bùi Davis in 2016, which included original tarot cards and other materials designed to address Asian American mental health through arts and humanities approaches rather than traditional medical models. Khúc described how her experiences as an adjunct professor teaching Asian American studies, combined with her own struggles with postpartum depression and her identity as a daughter of Vietnamese refugees, shaped her understanding that structural forces—rather than individual pathology—create unwellness. Her national speaking tour over seven years, during which she conducted workshops with thousands of students, revealed consistent patterns of student suffering and institutional failure to provide meaningful care, which became central material for the book.

== Summary ==
Khúc blends memoir, critical university studies, and disability justice to interrogate traditional approaches to mental health, with a focus on the mental health crisis within Asian American communities. Framed as letters to the author's daughter, students, and colleagues, dear elia rejects psychiatric models that treat mental illness as individual pathology. Khúc proposes instead a "pedagogy of unwellness," asserting that “we are all unwell” unwellness is a natural and ongoing response to structural violence, In turn, "wellness" as typically defined by productivity and made compulsory is itself a harmful construct.

The book begins with a behind the scenes making of the author's previous curatorial project Open in Emergency, which generated new languages for mental health through formally innovative arts-based tools like a hacked Diagnostic and Statistical Manual of Mental Disorders and an Asian American Tarot deck. Khúc then investigates the university environment based on her extensive tour of American colleges. She contrasts administrative definitions of wellness and unwellness with the lived realities of students. She argues that higher education operates as an "unwellness engine" where the pressure to succeed functions as slow dying.

Then her analysis narrows to the specific contours of Asian American suffering within the immigrant family. Based on the scholarship of erin Khuê Ninh, Khúc dissects "filial debt," the sense of debt children of immigrants feel toward their parents for their parents’ sacrifices, and locates its origins in immigrant struggle, not just cultural expectations. She frames this debt as a mechanism of control that demands the sacrifice of personhood to become the model minority. Understanding this becomes a lifesaving intervention, and she offers "ingratitude" as necessary for second-generation survival. This framing positions high rates of suicidal ideation among Asian American youth as responses to unlivable conditions of model minority racialization rather than simply biological disorders or intergenerational cultural conflict.

Based on a detailed account of her own expulsion from a university program she helped build as a contingent faculty member, Khúc illustrates how universities rely upon narratives of meritocracy based in ableism that demand hyper-productivity at the expense of health: "We live and work in a machine that makes us unwell while not allowing us to be unwell and punishes us for being unwell." She critiques the "Good Professor" archetype and professionalization industries for how they perpetuate unwellness, most evident in the experiences of adjuncts and contingent faculty who are second-class members of the professoriate.

In the final chapter of the book, Khúc deals with the classroom, advocating for radical pedagogical restructuring that centers access and care. She details her shift toward "access-centered" teaching during the onset of the COVID-19 pandemic, prioritizing student survival over traditional rigor and surveillance, and offers sample contrasting syllabi to show new strategies she developed and why. Interspersed between chapters are "Interludes" featuring Tarot reflections and interactive exercises that invite the reader to participate in the book's diagnostic and healing processes. She concludes the book by redefining Georgetown University's mission of cura personalis not as institutional slogan but as commitment to recognizing that "we are all differentially unwell" and deserving of care regardless of achievement.

== Reviews ==
Seo-Young Chu described the work as "brilliant and unconventional." Chu praised Khúc's capacity to challenge dominant frameworks around mental health and wellness. Chu found the book's concept of "differential unwellness" to be revelatory. She admitted how it illuminated her own experiences in relation to others across the "Asian American abyss." Chu also emphasized the text's experimental nature, incorporating syllabi, tarot cards, autotheory, and interactive prompts that make it suitable for classrooms and discussion groups. She said that the book saved her life, and described it as "unapologetically emotional, exuberantly unorthodox, fiercely compassionate."

In her review, Lena Chen described the book as a call for accountability that urges Asian American academics to rethink their roles in relation to unwellness. To Chen, the author used her own experiences as a terminated adjunct to illustrate the systemic undervaluing of service and mentorship in academia. She thought that the work advances "a radical notion" by proposing that scholars replace productivity with laziness. She admitted that reading the book challenged her own complicity in notions of achievement and productivity, especially as she read it while unwell during pregnancy and caring for a sick child.

Justine Trinh wrote her review in epistolary form (mirroring the book's structure) and described how the work gave her language to articulate feelings she had long struggled to express. She recounted her own experiences of racism and ableism in her graduate program and found that the author's list of student unwellnesses "perfectly encapsulated" how she felt. Trinh thought that the book is "changing and saving lives" and has already begun recommending it to colleagues and proposing care workshops in her department.

Caro Suringar found the opening line of the book stirring, evoking "a complex mix of emotions: sadness, anger, and, most of all, defiance." Suringar connected the author's critique of productivity-based wellness frameworks to her own research on burnout among first-generation university students in the Netherlands. Suringar praised the reflective prompts and exercises that encourage readers to define wellness beyond institutional expectations. She thought that the work offers a vision of care that transcends "the oppressive logic of productivity."

Brenda Wang found the book revelatory and urged fellow teachers to read it immediately. She noted that the author's frank admission of cutting corners, forgetting emails, and canceling classes helped her "unknot the tight ball of guilt and shame" she had carried since graduate school. Wang noted that the work asks Asian American scholars to reflect on how ideas of the "good student" have been shaped by model minority discourse. She praised the annotated syllabi sections where the author critiques her own past teaching materials.

In her review, Autumn Reyes noticed that the author takes great lengths to say this is not an academic book while nonetheless performing the work of one. She welcomed the vulnerability displayed throughout, and thought that the author's approach "shows an attentiveness that I found startling and heartbreaking." Reyes also stressed the multimodal elements including Mad Libs, tarot cards, and photocopied workshop notes. As a second-generation Asian American graduate student herself, she found the book addressed tribulations she had personally faced and witnessed.

Amy R. Wong located the book within the context of ongoing crises in higher education. She described it as a "searing indictment of the university as a gaslighting institution that demands compulsory wellness while making us unwell." Wong noted that the author does not mince words about tenured professors who "look away as your adjunct colleagues work themselves to death so you can write your beautiful books." Wong welcomed the psychoanalytic dimension of dwelling in unwellness as a form of resistance to institutional gaslighting. She considered the book ambitious in its intervention into both Asian American studies and critical university studies, and she observed it inhabits the academic monograph form "with a certain dis-ease," itself "unwell amidst institutional content and forms."

Cynthia Wu called the book an "impassioned critique" of two myths: the Asian American model minority and academic meritocracy. Wu thought that the work demands slow, deliberate reading and resists the skimming habits trained into academics. She focused on the annotated syllabi sections as "truly eye-opening," though she noted that the author's self-criticism of her past teaching sometimes "verges on self-flagellation," and that this may be the book's main flaw. Wu called the argument for centering adjunctification within Asian American studies "quite possibly the most provocative polemic" in the work.

Brendon M. Soltis found immediate connections between the author's critique of adjunct faculty treatment and the lived experiences of student affairs professionals, who also face disposability while maintaining university operations. Soltis praised it as "disruptive in its effort to revolutionize how we think about mental health in postsecondary contexts." He welcomed its challenge to individualized wellness models. His primary critique noted the omission of professional staff outside of academic affairs, arguing that these employees also enforce systems that make students unwell while suffering from their own lack of support. Soltis recommended that practitioners adapt the book's accessibility audit to review institutional policies and job descriptions through a pedagogy of unwellness.

== Awards ==
- The Association for Asian American Studies (AAAS) 2026 Book Award for Outstanding Contribution in the Interdisciplinary/Multidisciplinary category.
