= The Norton Anthology of Poetry =

Literary anthology

The Norton Anthology of Poetry is one of several literary anthologies published by W. W. Norton and Company. It is intended for classroom use, and has sold well.

The anthology appeared in 1970 and is in its sixth edition, a volume which includes 1,871 poems. The book has been seen as representing a canon. For example, the inclusion of Bob Dylan (whose "Boots of Spanish Leather" was anthologized before he won the Nobel Prize in Literature) was cited as evidence of the acceptance of his credentials as a poet.

== See also ==
- The Norton Anthology of Modern and Contemporary Poetry
