= Marilyn Chin =

American poet

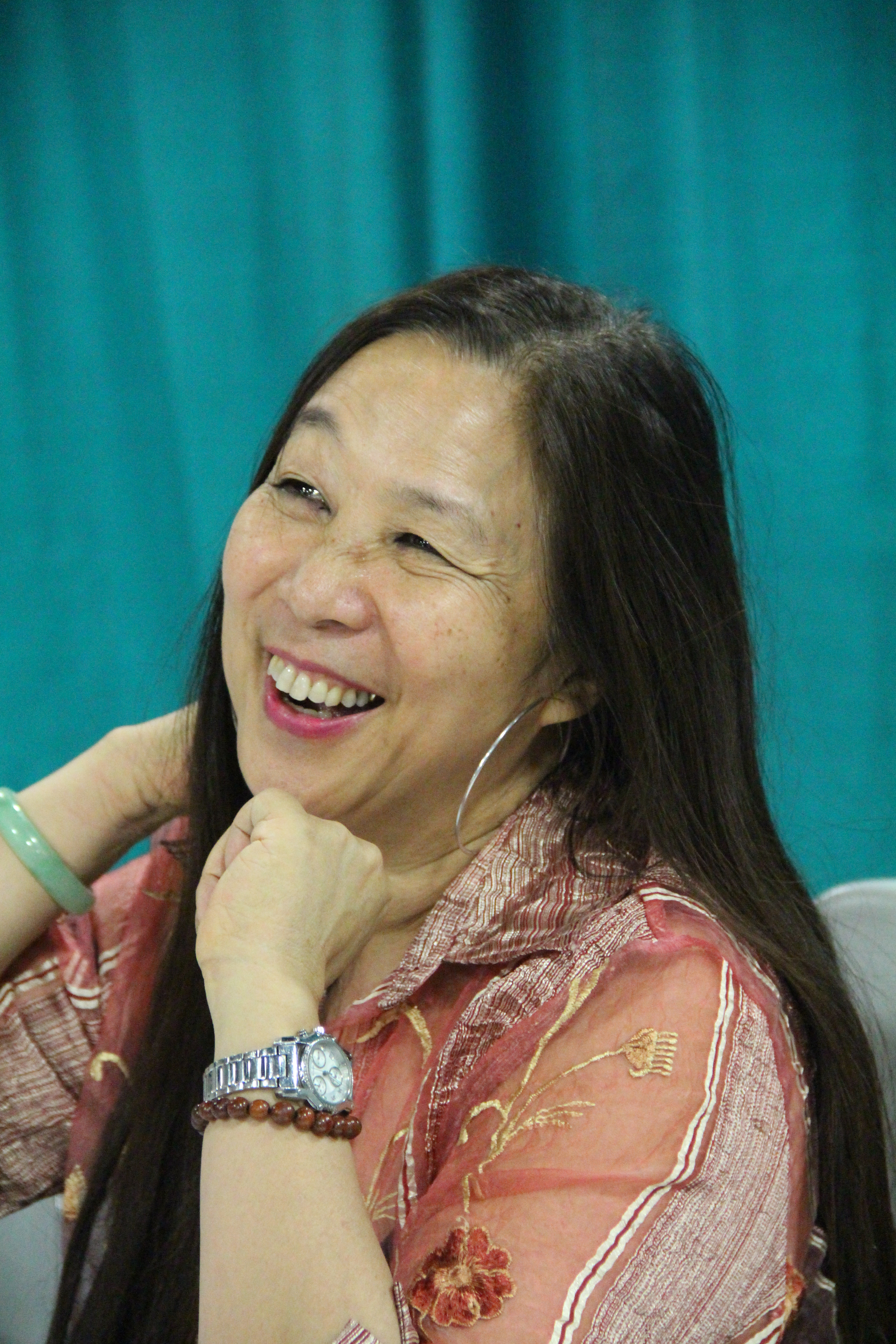
- Born: Mei Ling Chin; 1955 (age 70–71); Hong Kong;
- Citizenship: United States
- Education: University of Iowa
- Occupation: Writer
- Writing career
- Language: English
- Website: www.marilynchin.org

Marilyn Chin (陳美玲/陈美玲) is a prominent Chinese American poet, writer, activist, and feminist, as well as an editor and Professor of English. She is well-represented in major canonical anthologies and textbooks and her work is taught all over the world. Her work is a frequent subject of academic research and literary criticism. She has read her poetry at the Library of Congress.

== Life ==
Chin grew up in Portland, Oregon, after her family emigrated from Hong Kong. She received an M.F.A. from the University of Iowa and a B.A. from University of Massachusetts Her poetry focuses on social issues, especially those related to Asian American feminism and bi-cultural identity.

Chin has won numerous awards for her poetry, including the United Artists Foundation Fellowship, the Radcliffe Institute Fellowship at Harvard, the Rockefeller Foundation Fellowship at Bellagio, the SeaChange fellowship from the Gaia Foundation, two National Endowment for the Arts grants, the Stegner Fellowship, the PEN Oakland/Josephine Miles Literary Award, five Pushcart Prizes, a Fulbright Fellowship to Taiwan and the Anisfield-Wolf Book Award.

She is featured in several authoritative anthologies, including The Norton Anthology of Modern and Contemporary Poetry, The Norton Anthology of Literature by Women, The Norton Introduction to Poetry, The Oxford Anthology of Modern American Poetry, Unsettling America, The Open Boat and The Penguin Anthology of 20th Century American Poetry.

She was interviewed by Bill Moyers and featured in his PBS series "The Language of Life." Her poem “The Floral Apron” was introduced by Garrison Keillor on the PBS special “Poetry Everywhere."” It was also chosen by the BBC to represent the region of Hong Kong during the 2012 Olympics in London.

Chin is professor emerita at the Department of English and Comparative Literature at San Diego State University. In January 2018, she was elected a Chancellor of the Academy of American Poets.

== Awards and honors ==
- 2020 Poetry Foundation Ruth Lilly Poetry Prize
- 2019 The American Academy of Arts and Letters Award in Literature
- 2018 Academy of American Poets Chancellor
- 2014 California Book Awards Poetry Finalist for "Hard Love Province"
- Radcliffe Institute Fellowship at Harvard
- Rockefeller Foundation Fellowship at Bellagio
- Two National Endowment for the Arts Fellowships
- 2007 United States Artists Fellowship
- The Stegner Fellowship
- Five Pushcart Prize
- Fulbright Fellowship to Taiwan
- The SeaChange Fellowship from the Gaea Foundation
- 1995 PEN Oakland/Josephine Miles Literary Award

=== Residencies ===
- Civitella Ranieri Foundation
- Yaddo
- MacDowell Colony
- Lannan Foundation
- Djerassi Foundation

== Selected bibliography ==
Poetry

- Dwarf Bamboo Greenfield Review Press, 1987, ISBN 978-0-912678-71-9
- The Phoenix Gone, the Terrace Empty Milkweed Editions, 1994, ISBN 978-0-915943-87-6; Milkweed Editions, 2009, ISBN 978-1-57131-439-0
- Rhapsody in Plain Yellow: Poems W. W. Norton & Company, 2003, ISBN 978-0-393-32453-2
- Hard Love Province: Poems W. W. Norton & Company, 2014, ISBN 978-0-393-24096-2
- A Portrait of the Self as Nation: New and Selected Poems W. W. Norton & Company, 2018, ISBN 978-0-393-65217-8
- Sage, W. W. Norton & Company, 2023

Fiction

- Revenge of the Mooncake Vixen. W. W. Norton & Company. 2009. ISBN 978-0-393-07727-8.

Edited Anthologies

- Victoria M. Chang, ed. (2004). "Forward". Asian American Poetry: The Next Generation. Urbana-Champaign: University of Illinois Press. ISBN 978-0-252-07174-4.
- Ken Weisner; Marilyn Chin; David Wong Louie, eds. (1991). Dissident Song: A Contemporary Asian Anthology. Quarry West.

Translations

- Ai Qing (1985). The Selected Poems of Ai Qing. Translated by Marilyn Chin and Eugene Eoyang.
- Yoshimasu Gozo (1980). Devil's Wind: A Thousand Steps or More. Translated by Marilyn Chin. Oakland University.

Scholarship

Chin's work is the subject of a number of scholarly essays. A recent one explores the ironic voices in "Rhapsody in Plain Yellow" that challenge self-hatred and self colonization.
