= A Portrait of the Self as Nation =

A Portrait of the Self as Nation: New and Selected Poems
- Author: Marilyn Chin
- Genre: Poetry
- Publisher: W. W. Norton & Company
- Publication date: October 16, 2018
- Pages: 224
- ISBN: 978-0-393-65217-8

A Portrait of the Self as Nation: New and Selected Poems is a 2018 poetry collection by Marilyn Chin, published by W. W. Norton & Company.

== Background ==
Spanning thirty years of Chin's poetry, the book gathers selected work from Chin's first four poetry collections: Dwarf Bamboo (1987); The Phoenix Gone, the Terrace Empty (1994); Rhapsody in Plain Yellow (2002); and Hard Love Province (2014). It also includes excerpts from her novel Revenge of the Mooncake Vixen (2009), as well as completely new poems and translations.

== Reception ==
Maya Phillips, in American Poets, described the book as reflecting "a career of fiercely anti-colonialist, anti-xenophobic, feminist poems" and commended Chin for providing "a wealth of riches: jokes and puns; poems as blues songs, mythic allegories, or letters" drawing from multiple languages and cultural traditions.

The Kenyon Review lauded Chin's "audacious" range—describing her as "colloquial," "bawdy," "goofy," and "formally inventive"—and her ability to hold the nuances of both China and America in her poetics.

The South China Morning Post, called it "a poem-by-poem, line-by-line, image-by-image masterclass in formal play, allusion and wit" derived from "a prodigious career of poetry and advocacy."
