= Paul Bové =

American journalist

Paul A. Bové (born 1949 in Philadelphia) was professor of English at the University of Pittsburgh and former editor of the academic journal of postmodern theory, literature, and culture Boundary 2, published by Duke University Press. Bové was a member of the Pitt faculty since 1979 and was named a distinguished professor in 2005. He also held affiliations with the Institute for Cultural Studies at the University of Valencia in Spain and the Centre for International Political Studies in Pretoria, South Africa. From 1994 to 1999 he served on the board of directors of the former Institute of Postmodern Studies at Peking University.

== Selected writings ==
- Love's Shadow, Harvard UP 2021
- Poetry Against Torture: Criticism, History, and the Human
- In the Wake of Theory
- Mastering Discourse: The Politics of Intellectual Culture
- Intellectuals in Power: A Genealogy of Critical Humanism
- Destructive Poetics: Heidegger and Modern American Poetry
- A More Conservative Place: Intellectual Culture in the Bush Era
- Early Postmodernism: Foundational Essay, Durham, NC: Duke University, 1995
