= Dilys Laing =

American poet (1906–1960)

- Born: 1906; North Wales, Wales
- Died: 1960 (aged 53–54)
- Occupations: Poet; writer; artist
- Spouse: Alexander Laing (m. 1936)
- Children: 1

Dilys Bennett Laing (October 1906 – 14 February 1960) was an American poet.

== Education ==
Laing was born in Pwllheli, North Wales. She was educated in England and Canada. She married Alexander Laing, a Dartmouth College graduate, and later professor, in 1936 and became an American citizen. They had one son.

== Career ==
She was a writer, poet, and artist. She was admired by such contemporary poets as Robert Lowell. She died in 1960.

She was included in the Norton Anthology of Literature by Women.

Her papers are held at Dartmouth College.

== Bibliography ==
=== Journal contributions ===
- Growl Scares Dog, Good Housekeeping, New York, January, 1942
- Nautilus, Poetry Magazine, Volume 60, April 1942, Page 23
- To A Mathematician, June 13, 1942, The New Yorker, June 13, 1942, p. 17
- Eros Out of the Sea, Poetry Magazine, Volume 64, June 1944, Page 137
- 2 Poems, Yale Review Winter 1944
- That time of year, Harper's Magazine, January 1943, p.168
- Occult Adventure, Poetry Magazine, Volume 65, January 1945, Page 191
- Genesis and Exodus, Poetry Magazine, Volume 68, April 1946, Page 11
- Root and Branch, Poetry Magazine, Volume 68, April 1946, Page 11
- The Bell, Poetry Magazine, Volume 68, April 1946, Page 11
- Maidanek, Dachau, Buchenwald: A note for San Francisco, Angry Penguins, July 1946, Page 26
- Proof and Reproof, Yale Review, Summer 1946
- Men at Work, Harper's Magazine, January 1948, p.38
- Love has so Terrible a Face, Yale Review Autumn 1947
- Rescue, Poetry Magazine, Volume 72, May 1948, Page 74
- The Uncreation, Poetry Magazine, Volume 72, May 1948, Page 74
- Welcome Song, Poetry Magazine, Volume 72, May 1948, Page 74
- Harsh Return, Poetry Magazine, Volume 75, March 1950, Page 332
- Time Is All a Year, Poetry Magazine, Volume 79, March 1952, Page 321
- The Proud, Poetry Magazine, Volume 79, March 1952, Page 321
- To Dolores Preserved, Poetry Magazine, Volume 79, March 1952, Page 321
- Dance of Burros, Poetry Magazine, Volume 81, December 1952, Page 174
- Afternoon of a Forethinker, Poetry Magazine, Volume 82, May 1953, Page 72
- Capsule Dragon, Poetry Magazine, Volume 82, August 1953, Page 255
- Saint Giotto of Assisi, Poetry Magazine, Volume 83, February 1954, Page 256
- I Shall Know, Poetry Magazine, Volume 83, February 1954, Page 256
- The Catch, Poetry Magazine, Volume 85, October 1954, Page 13
- Profan Witness, The Beloit Poetry Journal, Fall 1955
- Let Them Ask Their Husbands, The Nation, January 4, 1958
- I Attend a Reception for a Visiting Celebrity, The Nation, May 24, 1958
- Walled City, The Nation, December 27, 1958
- Don't Tread on Us, The Nation, January 31, 1959
- The Compassionate Torturers, The Nation, April 23, 1960
- Threnody on the Demise of As and Now, The Nation, March 19, 1960
- The Dazzled Ones, The Nation, December 17, 1960
- The City and the Song, The Nation, February 25, 1961
- Picasso's Candlefire, Poetry Magazine, Volume 97, March 1961, Page 362
- The Swift Ships, Poetry Magazine, Volume 97, March 1961, Page 362
- Poems from a Cage, Poetry Magazine, Volume 101, December 1962, Page 209
- Maintenant, The Nation, July 27, 1963
- The Power, The Nation, August 24, 1963
- Flowers out of Rock, Poetry Magazine, Volume 104, April 1964, Page 14

=== Books ===
- Laing, Dylis Bennett (1941). Another England. New York: Duell, Sloan and Pearce.
- Laing, Dylis Bennett (1944). Birth Is Farewell. New York: Duell, Sloan and Pearce.
- Laing, Dylis Bennett (1945). Bouncing Bear: a Nursery Rhymer. Brice, Tony. Rand McNally & Company.
- Laing, Dylis Bennett (1946). Not One Atoll. Booth, Philip E. Hanover New Hampshire: Dartmouth College Library.
- Laing, Dylis Bennett (1948). The Great Year: A Novel. New York: Duell, Sloan and Pearce.
- Laing, Dylis Bennett (1949). Walk Through Two Landscapes. New York: Twayne.
- Laing, Dylis Bennett (1961). Poems From a Cage: New, Selected, and Translated Poems. New York: The Macmillan Company.
- Laing, Dylis Bennett (1967). The Collected Poems of Dilys Laing. Cleveland: Case Western Reserve University.

== Reviews ==
- Our Life in Poetry: Selected Essays and Reviews, M. L. Rosenthal, Persea Books (May 1991), ISBN 978-0-89255-149-1
