= Norton Anthology =

Norton Anthology may refer to one of several literary anthologies published by W. W. Norton & Company.

== List of Norton Anthologies ==
- The Norton Anthology of Native Nations Poetry
- The Norton Anthology of African American Literature
- The Norton Anthology of American Literature
- The Norton Anthology of Children's Literature: The Traditions in English
- The Norton Anthology of Contemporary Fiction
- The Norton Anthology of Drama
- The Norton Anthology of English Literature
- The Norton Anthology of Jewish American Literature
- The Norton Anthology of Latino Literature
- The Norton Anthology of Literature by Women
- The Norton Anthology of Modern and Contemporary Poetry
- The Norton Anthology of Poetry
- The Norton Anthology of Short Fiction
- The Norton Anthology of Theory and Criticism
- The Norton Anthology of Western Literature
- The Norton Anthology of Western Music
- The Norton Anthology of World Literature
- The Norton Anthology of World Religions
- The Norton Reader: An Anthology of Nonfiction
  - editors: Melissa Goldthwaite, Joseph Bizup, John Brereton, Anne Fernald, Linda Peterson
  - 14th edition with 2016 MLA updates, 2016, ISBN 978-0-393-61740-5, 1200 pages
- The Norton Reader, An Anthology of Expository Prose
  - editors: Arthur M. Eastman and others
  - 3rd edition, 1973, ISBN 978-0393093834
