= Norman Dubie =

American poet (1945–2023)

Norman Dubie (April 10, 1945--February 20, 2023) was an American poet from Barre, Vermont.

== Life ==
He was the author of twenty-eight collections of poetry. Dubie's work often assumes historical personae and has been included in The New Yorker, Ploughshares, The Paris Review, FIELD, Narrative, The American Poetry Review, The Fiddlehead, and Blackbird, an online journal of literature and the arts. His work has been included in numerous Norton anthologies of poetry.

With his latest collection of poems, The Quotations of Bone, published in 2015 by Copper Canyon Press, Dubie was the international recipient of the 2016 Griffin Poetry Prize. The poems in this collection confront viciousness in its many forms.

== Awards ==
Dubie was the recipient of numerous honors and awards. These include fellowships from the National Endowment for the Arts and the Ingram Merrill Foundation, the Bess Hokin Prize from Poetry Magazine and the Modern Poetry Association, and the John Simon Guggenheim Memorial Foundation Award. In 2002, he won the PEN Center USA prize for his collection, The Mercy Seat: Collected and New Poems. Dubie is a graduate of Goddard College and the Iowa Writer's Workshop. He taught in the graduate Creative Writing Program at Arizona State University, in Tempe, Arizona, where he was Regents' Professor of English.

The Tucson-based band Calexico have stated that Dubie's poetry was very influential on their album Carried to Dust, particularly the song "Two Silver Trees".

== Selected books ==
- Selected & New Poems (1986) ISBN 978-0-393-30140-3
- Groom Falconer (1990) ISBN 0-393-30570-8
- Radio Sky (1992) ISBN 978-0-393-30852-5
- The Mercy Seat : Collected and New Poems 1967-2001 (Copper Canyon Press, 2001) ISBN 1-55659-212-4
- Ordinary Mornings of a Coliseum (Copper Canyon Press, 2004) ISBN 1-55659-213-2
- The Insomniac Liar of Topo (Copper Canyon Press, 2007)
- The Volcano (Copper Canyon Press, 2010)
- Quotations of Bone (Copper Canyon Press, 2015)

=== Anthologies ===
- The Morrow Anthology of Younger American Poets
- The Norton Anthology of Modern and Contemporary Poetry
- David Walker, ed. (2006). American Alphabets: 25 Contemporary Poets. Oberlin College Press. ISBN 978-0-932440-28-0.

== Sources ==
- Academy of American Poets
