= Sigbjørn Obstfelder =

Norwegian writer and poet

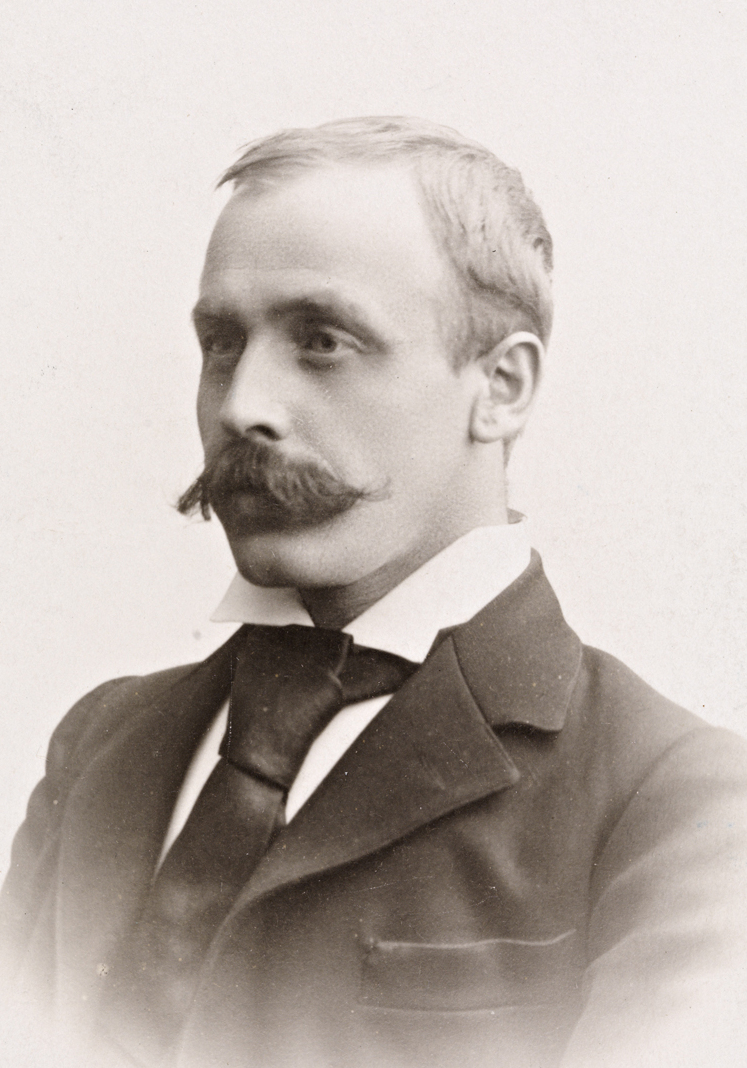
- Obstfelder in 1900
- Born: Sigbjørn Obstfelder; 21 November 1866; Stavanger, Norway
- Died: 29 July 1900 (aged 33); København, Denmark
- Education: University of Christiania
- Occupations: Poet, Drafstman, Surveyor
- Writing career
- Period: 1887-1900
- Literary movement: Modernist Literature

Sigbjørn Obstfelder (21 November 1866 – 29 July 1900) was a 19th-century Norwegian writer and poet.

== Background ==
Obstfelder was born in Stavanger, Norway on November 21, 1866. He was the eighth child in a family of sixteen children, being one of only six siblings to survive to adulthood. His father, Herman Friedrik Obstfelder (1828–1906), was a baker by trade and provided little financial or emotional support. His mother, Serine Obstfelder (née Egelandsdal) (1836–1880) died when he was fourteen. The difficulties he experienced, a threatening male figure, the loss of the mother and the sense of ever-present death, were strong influences on his writing.

He began to study at the University of Christiania in 1886. Two years later he started studying engineering at Christiania Technical School (now Oslo ingeniørhøgskole). In 1890, he moved to Milwaukee, Wisconsin where he took a job as a draftsman at a bridge construction company. After only a year, he returned to Norway, where he had a nervous breakdown and was briefly hospitalized in Christiania.

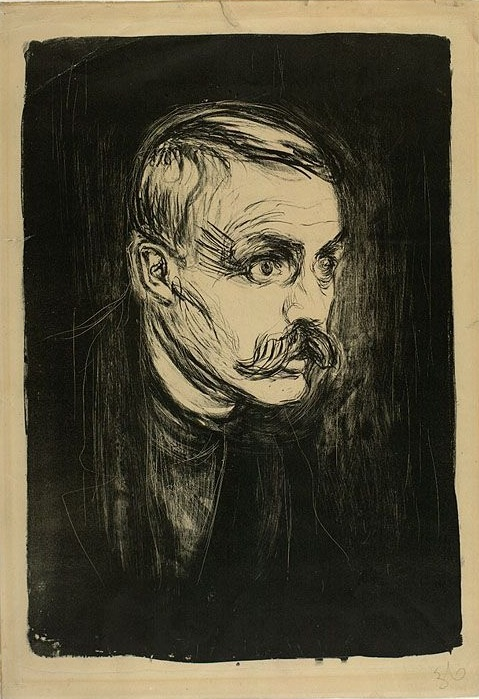
Obstfelder lithograph by Edvard Munch.

== Literary career ==
His first published work was a contribution to the feminist journal Nylænde (New Frontiers) on the topic of the chastity of men before marriage. The piece features early shades of a recurring theme in his work, the fear of the erotic woman.

Obstfelder's entry into the Norwegian literary scene comes with his meeting Jens Thiis in 1892 in Paris. They travelled together in Belgium, where Obstfelder wrote some of his best works and thereafter supported himself on his writing.

Primarily known as a writer of poetry, Obstfelder's debut collection of poems from 1893, Digte (Poems), is usually credited as one of the earliest examples of modernism in Norwegian literature. Despite producing a relatively small amount of works during his short lifespan, he is considered one of the most important figures in Norwegian literature of the late 19th century. Strongly influenced by the French poet Charles Baudelaire, his writings have often been described as the literary equivalent of Edvard Munch's paintings; indeed, Munch made two lithographs of Obstfelder, who in turn wrote an essay in Munch's defense for Samtiden in 1896. Additionally, Munch was mysteriously in possession of some of Obstfelder's manuscripts. Obstfelder was a source of inspiration for Rainer Maria Rilke's work The Notebooks of Malte Laurids Brigge.

Although known more for his poems, Obstfelder also wrote and published prose works. His first published prose were two short stories, which came out in 1895. The following year he published his famous novel The Cross. In 1897, he published a play, The Red Drops, which was listed in the National Theatre in 1902. Several of his works were published posthumously, including the unfinished A Priest's Diary (1900). His journals from his stay in the U.S. were also published. In 2000, on the occasion of the 100th anniversary of Obstfelder's death, a collection of his works was published.

== Contribution to Norwegian poetry ==
Obstfelder is widely regarded as the first Norwegian modernist poet. His poems have left an indelible mark on Norwegian poetry. Choosing to depart from the traditional "rimtvangen" and the rigid structure of typical Norwegian verse, he created his own free verse, which was marked for its musicality. His poems are often tinged with anxiety, loneliness and alienation as well imparting a spiritual inclination. His poetry is considered by many to be the literary counterpart to expressionist art of Edvard Munch.

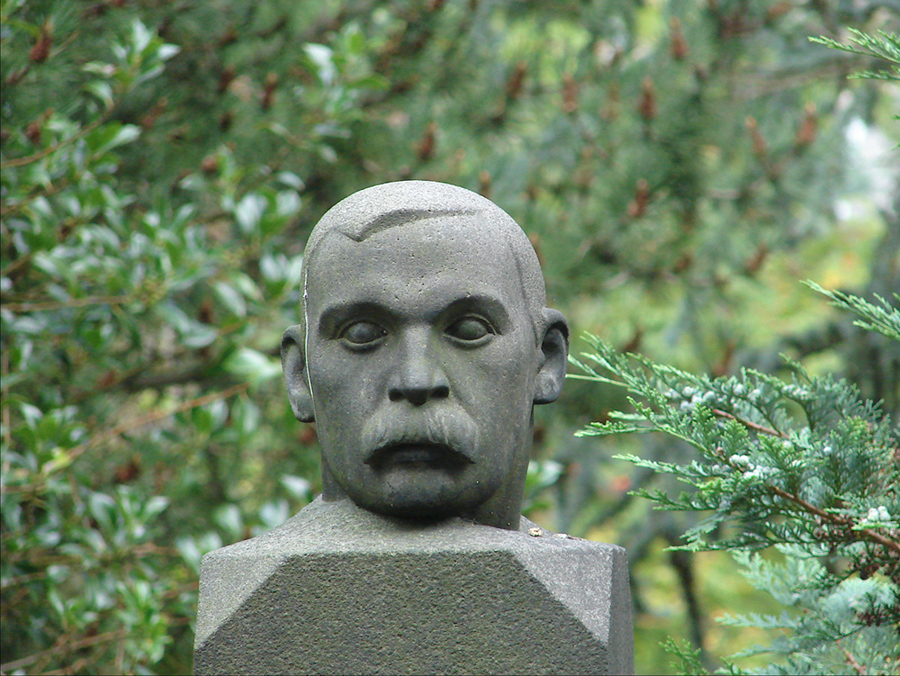
Obstfelder's bust in the Frederiksberg Ældre Kirkegård

== Personal ==
Obstfelder lived most of his life as a pauper, and never stayed in one place for very long. By all accounts he had an unstable mental health, and suffered several nervous breakdowns. In 1898, he married the Danish singer Ingeborg Weeke (1876–1930), but it was a brief and turbulent marriage. He died of tuberculosis at the Municipal Hospital in Copenhagen at 33 years of age. He was buried at Frederiksberg Ældre Kirkegård on the same day his only child, Lili, was born.

== Memorials ==
Obstfelder's memory is celebrated in numerous cities in Europe. In 1917, his bust, created by Gustav Vigeland, was unveiled in the Stavanger city park. Another bust has been placed in the Frederiksberg Ældre Kirkegård at Frederiksberg in Copenhagen. A bust of Obstfelder by Per Palle Storm is at NTNU Trondheim's Technology Library with the inscription: "Remember that there are many values in life beyond technology."

== Gallery ==
Cover of Obstfelder's Digte

Cover of Obstfelder's
To novelletter

Cover of Obstfelder's
De røde Dråber

Cover of Obstfelder's Korset

Cover of Obstfelder's
En Præsts Dagbog

== Selected works ==
- Digte (Poems), 1893
- To novelletter (Two novellettes), 1895
- Korset (The Cross, novel), 1896
- De røde dråber (The Red Droplets, a play), 1897
- En præsts dagbog (A Priest's Diary, novel), incomplete, released posthumously 1900
- Efterladte arbeider (Unfinished works), 1903
- Samlede skrifter I-III (Collected Writings), 1950 contains a lot of previously unreleased material
