= William V. Spanos =

William Vaios Spanos (31 December 1924 – 29 December 2017) was an American literary critic.

Spanos was a Distinguished Professor of English and comparative literature at Binghamton University (SUNY) and was a founder and editor of the critical journal boundary 2. His work draws heavily on the philosophical legacy of Martin Heidegger, and while it does show the influence of the deconstruction of Jacques Derrida and Paul de Man, Spanos's vocabulary and concepts remain closer to Heidegger's Destruktion ("destruction") of metaphysics than to its philosophical successors.

Spanos took a post-modern approach to the West, globalization, colonization, and general interventionist foreign policy. He talked about a problem/solution mindset that America was in during the Vietnam War, and how all foreign policy now is still stuck in this framework. Spanos' work derives from philosophers ranging from Heidegger and Nietzsche to Foucault.

== Early life and education ==
Spanos was born in Newport, New Hampshire, the son of Greek immigrants. A veteran of World War II, he was captured during the Battle of the Bulge and taken a prisoner of war to Dresden, Germany. There, he survived the Allied firebombing of the city. It was a singular experience that he only recounted fifty years later in his autobiographical book In the Neighborhood of Zero.

Spanos completed his PhD at the University of Wisconsin–Madison in 1964.

== Selected works ==
=== Books ===
- A Casebook on Existentialism, Crowell, 1966
- Repetitions: the Postmodern Occasion in Literature and Culture, Baton Rouge: Louisiana State University Press, 1987
- The End of Education: Toward Posthumanism, Minneapolis: University of Minnesota Press, 1993
- Heidegger and Criticism: Retrieving the Cultural Politics of Destruction, Minneapolis: University of Minnesota Press, 1993
- The Errant Art of Moby-Dick: The Cold War, the Canon, and the Struggle for American Literary Studies, Durham, NC: Duke University Press, 1995
- America's Shadow: An Anatomy of Empire, University of Minnesota Press, 1999
- The Legacy of Edward W. Said, University of Illinois Press, 2009
- In the Neighborhood of Zero, University of Nebraska Press, 2010

=== Papers ===
- 'Heidegger's Parmenides: Greek Modernity and the Classical Legacy', in Modern Greek Studies
- 'Heidegger, Nazism, and the Repressive Hypothesis: The American Appropriation of the Question', in boundary 2, vol. 17, 1990
- 'Althusser's 'Problematic' in the Context of the Vietnam War: Towards a Spectral Politics', in Rethinking Marxism, vol. 10, no. 3, 1998
- 'Rethinking the Postmodernity of the Discourse of Postmodernism', in International Postmodernism: Theory and Literary Practice, ed. Hans Bertens and Douwwe Fokkema, Amsterdam: John Benjamins, 1997
