= Robert S. Levine =

American literary scholar

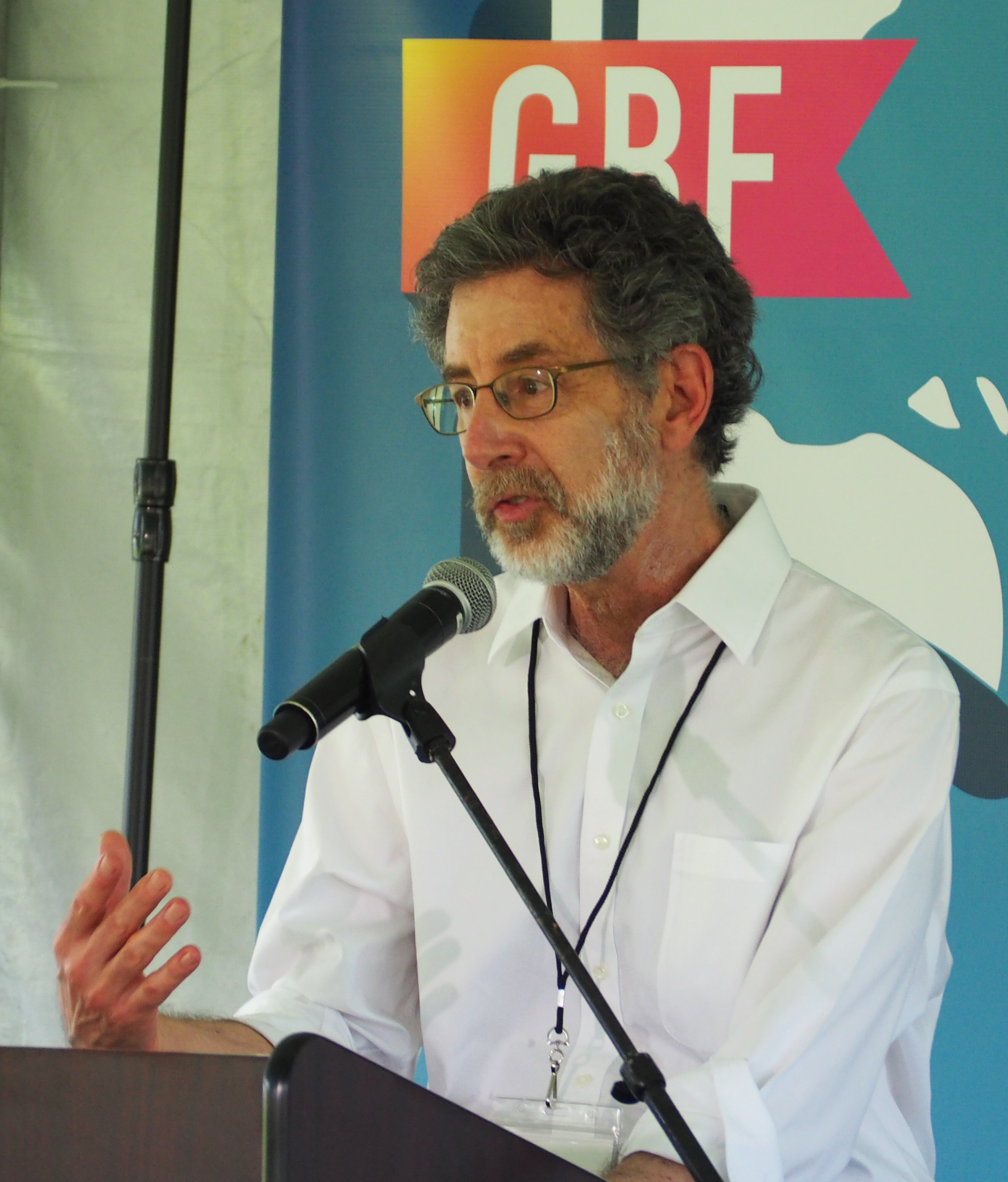
- Awards: Guggenheim Fellowship (2013)

Academic background
- Education: Columbia University (BA); Stanford University (PhD)

Academic work
- Discipline: American literature
- Institutions: University of Maryland, College Park

Robert S. Levine is a scholar of American and African American literature. He is currently Distinguished University Professor and Distinguished Scholar-Teacher at the University of Maryland, College Park.

== Biography ==
Levine received his B.A. from Columbia University in 1975 and his PhD from Stanford University in 1981. His research focuses on 19th-century American literature, especially on the life and works of Frederick Douglass. He sits on the editorial boards of numerous academic journals including American Literary History and Journal of American Studies and serves as General Editor of The Norton Anthology of American Literature.

== Works ==
- Conspiracy and Romance: Studies in Brockden Brown, Cooper, Hawthorne, and Melville (1989)
- Martin Delany, Frederick Douglass, and the Politics of Representative Identity (1997)
- The Cambridge Companion to Herman Melville, editor (1998)
- Martin R. Delany: A Documentary Reader, editor (2003)
- Dislocating Race and Nation: Episodes in Nineteenth-Century American Literary Nationalism (2008)
- Frederick Douglass & Herman Melville: Essays in Relation, editor, with Samuel Otter (2008)
- "Genealogical Fictions: Race in The House of the Seven Gables and Pierre", in Argersinger, Jana L. and Person, Leland S., eds. Hawthorne and Melville: Writing a Relationship (2008).
- The New Cambridge Companion to Herman Melville, editor (2014)
- The Heroic Slave [a story by Frederick Douglass]: A Cultural and Critical Edition, co-edited with John Stauffer and John R. McKivigan (2015)
- The Lives of Frederick Douglass (2016)
- Race, Transnationalism, and Nineteenth-Century American Literary Studies (2018)
- The Failed Promise: Reconstruction, Frederick Douglass, and the Impeachment of Andrew Johnson (2021)
- Nathaniel Hawthorne: Parables, Fantasies, Fragments, editor (2026). Library of America From Hawthorne's American Notebooks.
  - "Nathaniel Hawthorne’s notebooks reveal the strange workings of his imagination". The Conversation, October 26, 2026.
- After Uncle Tom's Cabin: Harriet Beecher Stowe and the Quest for Interracial Democracy (forthcoming in January 2027)

== Awards ==
- Outstanding Book Award from Choice Reviews magazine in 1997
- 2012 National Endowment for the Humanities Senior Fellowship
- 2013 Guggenheim Fellowship
- 2014 Hubbell Medal for Lifetime Achievement
