= Jeffrey J. Williams =

American academic and critic

- Born: 1958 (age 67–68)
- Occupations: Literary and cultural studies scholar and critic
- Known for: Critical university studies
- Title: Professor of English; Professor of Literary and Cultural Studies

Academic background
- Education: Stony Brook University

Academic work
- Institutions: East Carolina University (1990–1998); University of Missouri (1998–2004); Carnegie Mellon University (since 2004– )
- Main interests: Student debt; literary theory

Jeffrey J. Williams (born 1958) is an American literary and cultural studies scholar and critic. Since 2004, he has been a Professor of English and of Literary and Cultural Studies at Carnegie Mellon University. Williams is most known for his contributions to critical university studies, including his 2012 naming of the field, and his extensive critical interview project. He is the former editor of The Minnesota Review and co-editor of The Norton Anthology of Theory and Criticism.

== Early life and education ==
Aged twenty years, Williams left Columbia College without completing his degree and worked at Downstate Correctional Facility as a New York State correction officer. In 1984, he graduated from Stony Brook University with a Bachelor of Arts (English) and gained his PhD (English) in 1990. He worked at Routledge from 1989-1990.

== Academic career ==
In 1990, Williams became an Assistant Professor of English at East Carolina University and then joined the University of Missouri in 1998. In 2004, he joined Carnegie Mellon’s English Department as a Professor of Literary and Cultural Studies. From 1992 until 2010, Williams was the editor-in-chief of The Minnesota Review. In 2010, Carnegie Mellon cut funding for the journal, a move Williams publicly critiqued in The Chronicle of Higher Education.

Williams conducted over eighty interviews with critics, theorists, and philosophers as a part of The Interview Project. The interviews appeared in a number of journals. Some of the interviews were republished in Critics at Work: Interviews 1993-2003.

In 2012, Williams coined the term “Critical University Studies” in print and defined its scope in his essay “Deconstructing Academe: The birth of critical university studies." He is the editor of Critical University Studies series alongside Christopher Newfield. His critical university studies writing has focused on student debt, academic labor, innovation and inequality, the academic novel, and the politics of tenure.

== Selected published works ==
- Williams, Jeffrey J., ed. (1994). PC Wars: Politics and Theory in the Academy. Routledge.
- Williams, Jeffrey (1998). Theory and the Novel: Narrative Reflexivity in the British Tradition. Literature, Culture, Theory. Cambridge: Cambridge University Press. ISBN 978-0-521-43039-5.
- Williams, Jeffrey J., ed. (2001). The Norton Anthology of Theory and Criticism. New York: W. W. Norton & Co.
- Williams, Jeffrey J., ed. (2004). Critics at Work: Interviews 1993-2003. New York: New York University Press.
- Williams, Jeffrey J.; Steffen, Heather, eds. (2012). The Critical Pulse: Thirty-Six Credos by Contemporary Critics. New York: Columbia University Press. ISBN 978-0-231-53073-6.
- Williams, Jeffrey J. (2014). How to Be an Intellectual. Bronx: Fordham University Press.
