= The Norton Anthology of Modern and Contemporary Poetry =

Two-volumes edited by Jahan Ramazani, Richard Ellmann and Robert O'Clair.

The Norton Anthology of Modern and Contemporary Poetry is an anthology of two volumes edited by Jahan Ramazani, Richard Ellmann (1918–1987), and Robert O'Clair.

The anthology is large, with 1,100 pages in each of the two volumes. Volume I, about modern poetry, and Volume II, contemporary poetry. Essays on poetics are included in each volume.

Published by W.W. Norton & Co., the anthology has gone through three editions, the latest published in 2003.

The three editors are academics or former academics: Jahan Ramazani is at the University of Virginia; Richard Ellmann, late of Oxford University and Emory University; Robert O'Clair, late of Manhattanville College.

== Volume I: Modern Poetry ==
These poets are represented in the volume (listed chronologically by birth date, as in the book):

- Walt Whitman
- Emily Dickinson
- Thomas Hardy
- Gerard Manley Hopkins
- A. E. Housman
- William Butler Yeats
- Rudyard Kipling
- Edgar Lee Masters
- Edwin Arlington Robinson
- Gertrude Stein
- Amy Lowell
- Robert Frost
- Carl Sandburg
- Edward Thomas
- Wallace Stevens
- Mina Loy
- William Carlos Williams
- Elinor Wylie
- D. H. Lawrence
- Ezra Pound
- Siegfried Sassoon
- H.D.
- Robinson Jeffers
- Edwin Muir
- Edith Sitwell
- Marianne Moore
- John Crowe Ransom
- T. S. Eliot
- Ivor Gurney
- Claude McKay
- Isaac Rosenberg
- Edna St. Vincent Millay
- Archibald MacLeish
- Hugh MacDiarmid
- Wilfred Owen
- Dorothy Parker
- Charles Reznikoff
- E. E. Cummings
- Jean Toomer
- Robert Graves
- David Jones
- Austin Clarke
- Louise Bogan
- Melvin Tolson
- Hart Crane
- Allen Tate
- Basil Bunting
- Yvor Winters
- Laura Riding
- Sterling Brown
- Langston Hughes
- Stevie Smith
- Lorine Niedecker
- Countee Cullen
- Louis Zukofsky
- Richard Eberhart
- C. Day-Lewis
- Patrick Kavanagh
- Robert Penn Warren
- Stanley Kunitz
- Kenneth Rexroth
- John Betjeman
- William Empson
- W. H. Auden
- A. D. Hope
- Louis MacNeice
- George Oppen
- Theodore Roethke
- Stephen Spender
- Keith Douglas

=== Prose on poetics ===
- Walt Whitman
- Emily Dickinson
- Gerard Manley Hopkins
- William Butler Yeats
- T. E. Hulme
- Blast
- Mina Loy
- Amy Lowell, editor
- Wilfred Owen
- Ezra Pound
- T. S. Eliot
- William Carlos Williams
- D. H. Lawrence
- Langston Hughes
- Hart Crane
- Wallace Stevens
- Robert Frost
- Gertrude Stein
- Marianne Moore
- W. H. Auden

== Volume II: Contemporary Poetry ==
These poets have work in the volume (listed chronologically by birth date, as in the book):

- Charles Olson
- Elizabeth Bishop
- May Swenson
- Robert Hayden
- Karl Shapiro
- Delmore Schwartz
- Muriel Rukeyser
- William Stafford
- Randall Jarrell
- John Berryman
- Dylan Thomas
- Judith Wright
- P. K. Page
- Robert Lowell
- Gwendolyn Brooks
- Robert Duncan
- William Meredith
- Lawrence Ferlinghetti
- Louise Bennett
- Howard Nemerov
- Amy Clampitt
- Richard Wilbur
- Kingsley Amis
- Donald Davie
- Philip Larkin
- Anthony Hecht
- James Dickey
- Alan Dugan
- Louis Simpson
- Denise Levertov
- Richard Hugo
- Kenneth Koch
- Maxine Kumin
- Donald Justice
- W. D. Snodgrass
- A. R. Ammons
- James Merrill
- Robert Creeley
- Allen Ginsberg
- Frank O'Hara
- Robert Bly
- Charles Tomlinson
- Galway Kinnell
- John Ashbery
- W. S. Merwin
- James Wright
- Philip Levine
- Thomas Kinsella
- Anne Sexton
- A. K. Ramanujan
- Richard Howard
- Adrienne Rich
- Thom Gunn
- John Hollander
- Derek Walcott
- Gary Snyder
- Kamau Brathwaite
- Christopher Okigbo
- Ted Hughes
- Okot p'Bitek
- Geoffrey Hill
- Sylvia Plath
- Mark Strand
- Wole Soyinka
- Amiri Baraka
- Charles Wright
- Mary Oliver
- Marge Piercy
- Lucille Clifton
- June Jordan
- Tony Harrison
- Susan Howe
- Michael S. Harper
- Charles Simic
- Les Murray
- Seamus Heaney
- Frank Bidart
- Michael Longley
- Margaret Atwood
- Eunice De Souza
- Robert Pinsky
- Robert Hass
- Lyn Hejinian
- Derek Mahon
- Sharon Olds
- Marilyn Hacker
- Dave Smith
- Louise Gluck
- Michael Palmer
- Michael Ondaatje
- James Tate
- Eavan Boland
- Craig Raine
- Norman Dubie
- Yusef Komunyakaa
- Lorna Goodison
- Ai
- Leslie Marmon Silko
- Agha Shahid Ali
- James Fenton
- Grace Nichols
- Charles Bernstein
- Carolyn Forche
- Jorie Graham
- Anne Carson
- Medbh McGuckian
- Joy Harjo
- Paul Muldoon
- Gary Soto
- Rita Dove
- Alberto Rios
- Mark Doty
- Thylias Moss
- Louise Erdrich
- Lorna Dee Cervantes
- Marilyn Chin
- Cathy Song
- Carol Ann Duffy
- Dionisio D. Martinez
- Henri Cole
- Li-Young Lee
- Sherman Alexie

=== Prose on poetics ===
- Charles Olson
- Dylan Thomas
- Philip Larkin
- Frank O'Hara
- Allen Ginsberg
- Amiri Baraka
- Denise Levertov
- Adrienne Rich
- Seamus Heaney
- Louise Bennett
- Charles Bernstein
- A. K. Ramanujan
- Derek Walcott

== Additional information ==
ISBN numbers, 2003 edition

- Two-volume instructor's set • ISBN 0-393-97977-6
- Two-volume student set • ISBN 0-393-97978-4
- Volume 1: Modern Poetry • ISBN 0-393-97791-9
- Volume 2: Contemporary Poetry • ISBN 0-393-97792-7

== See also ==
Modern and contemporary poetry anthologies

- Oxford Book of Modern Verse 1892–1935
- New Poets of England and America
- The Harvill Book of Twentieth-Century Poetry in English
- Penguin Book of Contemporary Verse (1962)

United Kingdom

- The Oxford Book of Twentieth Century English Verse (1973)
- New British Poetry (2004)
- The Penguin Book of Contemporary British Poetry (1982)

United States

- The New American Poetry 1945–1960
- Postmodern American Poetry
- The Best American Poetry series
