= Geoffrey Galt Harpham =

American academic (born 1946)

- Born: 1946; United States
- Occupations: University teacher; philologist
- Awards: Guggenheim Fellowship
- Scientific career
- Fields: English studies, philology, humanities

Geoffrey Galt Harpham (born 1946) is an American academic who served as president and director of the National Humanities Center from 2002–15. One of the characteristics of his tenure was the encouragement of dialogue between the humanities on the one hand and the natural and social sciences on the other. He is a senior fellow at the Kenan Institute for Ethics at Duke University and also a Life Member of Clare Hall at the University of Cambridge.

== Notable works ==
His book The Humanities and the Dream of America, was published by the University of Chicago Press in March 2011. In his 2026 work The Ends of Race: The Rise and Fall of a Scientific Myth, Harpham delves into Craniology, and how the belief became important in racial debates throughout the United States and Europe.

== Bibliography ==
=== Books ===
- On the Grotesque: Strategies of Contradiction in Art and Literature (Princeton University Press, 1982; paperback, 1986). 2nd ed. with new preface (Davies Publishing, 2006). This work was the primary inspiration for “Domus Aurea,” a composition by Edmund Campion for piano and vibraphone, which premiered at the Centre Pompidou, Paris, November 4, 2000.
- The Ascetic Imperative in Culture and Criticism (University of Chicago Press, 1987; paperback, 1992).
- Getting It Right: Language, Literature, and Ethics (University of Chicago Press, 1992). Partially translated into Croatian as Pripovjedni Imperative, in Politika ietika pripovijedanja, ed. Vladimir Biti (Zagreb: Hrvatska sveucilišna naklada, 2003), 129–56.
- One of Us: The Mastery of Joseph Conrad (University of Chicago Press, 1996).
- Shadows of Ethics: Criticism and the Just Society (Duke University Press, 1999).
- Language Alone: The Critical Fetish of Modernity (Routledge Press, 2002).
- A Glossary of Literary Terms, 8th ed., coauthored with M.H. Abrams (Wadsworth, 2005); 9th ed. (Wadsworth, 2008). Translated into Persian, Turkish, Chinese, Korean, Greek. Indian edition, 2009.
- The Character of Criticism (Routledge Press, 2006).
- On Being Human, special issue of Daedalus, 138.3 (2009), consulting editor. This issue grew out of the “Autonomy, Singularity, Creativity: The Human and the Humanities” initiative sponsored by the National Humanities Center, 2006–09.
- The Humanities and the Dream of America (University of Chicago Press, 2011).
- Harpham, Geoffrey Galt (2017). What do you think, Mr. Ramirez? : the American revolution in education. Chicago: The University of Chicago Press.
- Scholarship and Freedom ([Harvard University Press]), 2020).
- Citizenship on Catfish Row: Race and Nation in American Popular Culture ([University of South Carolina Press], 2022).
- Theories of Race, at: theoriesofrace.com

=== Critical studies and reviews of Harpham's work ===
- Reitter, Paul (22 February 2018). "The business of learning". The New York Review of Books. 65 (3): 30, 32–33. Review of What do you think, Mr. Ramirez?.
