= Mimi Khúc =

American writer

Mimi Khúc is a writer and scholar working at the intersection of Asian American, gender, and disability studies. Her work addresses decolonizing Asian American mental health and decolonizing mental health systems. She is the author of dear elia: Letters from the Asian American Abyss (Duke University Press, 2024). She is the managing editor of the Asian American Literary Review and teaches at Georgetown University where she was Scholar/Artist/Activist in Residence in Disability Studies 2019-2021. She is married to Lawrence-Minh Bùi Davis and they have a daughter, Elia, and two sons.

== Education and career ==
She earned her BA in Sociology & Religious Studies from the University of Maryland and an MA (2006) and PhD (2013) in Religious Studies from the University of California Santa Barbara.

Khúc worked at the University of Maryland from 2013 to 2017 as a lecturer in the Asian American Studies department.

== Publications ==
=== Books ===
- dear elia: Letters from the Asian American Abyss. Duke University Press. 2024. ISBN 978-1478025672.

=== Book Chapters ===
- Khúc, Mimi (2023-08-01). "1. Writing While Adjunct: A Contingent Pedagogy of Unwellness". Crip Authorship. New York University Press. pp. 25–32. doi:10.18574/nyu/9781479819386.003.0004. ISBN 978-1-4798-1938-6.
- Khúc, Mimi (2020-08-31). "5: Where the History Books End". In Yoo, David K.; Joshi, Khyati Y. (eds.). Envisioning Religion, Race, and Asian Americans. University of Hawaii Press. ISBN 978-0-8248-8274-7.
- Khúc, Mimi (2016). "(Un)Making Mothers, Orphans, and Transnational Adoptees: The Afterlife of the Vietnam War in Aimee Phan's We Should Never Meet". In Kim, Nami; Joh, Wonhee Anne (eds.). Critical Theology against US Militarism in Asia: Decolonization and Deimperialization. New York: Palgrave Macmillan US. pp. 81–100. doi:10.1057/978-1-137-48013-2_4. ISBN 978-1-137-48013-2.

=== Articles ===
- Chen, Mel Y.; Khúc, Mimi; Kim, Jina B. (2023-12-01). "Work Will Not Save Us: An Asian American Crip Manifesto". Disability Studies Quarterly. 43 (1). doi:10.18061/dsq.v43i1.9652. ISSN 2159-8371.

== Artistic projects ==
=== Book art ===
- Khúc, Mimi (2016). Open in Emergency.

=== Word art ===
- Khúc, Mimi (2016). Asian American Tarot.
- Davis, Lawrence-Minh Bùi; Khúc, Mimi (2019). The Book of Curses.
