= M. H. Abrams =

American literary theorist (1912–2015)

- Born: Meyer Howard Abrams; July 23, 1912; Long Branch, New Jersey, U.S.
- Died: April 21, 2015 (aged 102); Ithaca, New York, U.S.
- Other name: Mike Abrams
- Education: Harvard University (AB, MA, PhD); Magdalene College, Cambridge
- Occupation: Literary critic
- Known for: The Norton Anthology of English Literature (general editor); The Mirror and the Lamp: Romantic Theory and the Critical Tradition (1953); Natural Supernaturalism: Tradition and Revolution in Romantic Literature (1971)

Meyer Howard Abrams (July 23, 1912 – April 21, 2015), usually cited as M. H. Abrams, was an American literary critic, known for works on romanticism, in particular his book The Mirror and the Lamp. Under Abrams's editorship, The Norton Anthology of English Literature became the standard text for undergraduate survey courses across the U.S. and a major trendsetter in literary canon formation.

== Early life and education ==
Born in Long Branch, New Jersey, Abrams was the son of Eastern European Jewish immigrants. The son of a house painter and the first in his family to go to college, he entered Harvard University as an undergraduate in 1930. He went into English because, he says, "there weren't jobs in any other profession..., so I thought I might as well enjoy starving, instead of starving while doing something I didn't enjoy." After earning his bachelor's degree in 1934, Abrams won a Henry Fellowship to Magdalene College, Cambridge, where his tutor was I. A. Richards. He returned to Harvard for graduate school in 1935 and received a master's degree in 1937 and a Ph.D. in 1940.

== Career ==
During World War II, he served at the Psycho-Acoustics Laboratory at Harvard. He describes his work as solving the problem of voice communications in a noisy military environment by establishing military codes that are highly audible and inventing selection tests for personnel who had a superior ability to recognize sound in a noisy background.

In 1945, Abrams became a professor at Cornell University. The literary critics Harold Bloom, Gayatri Spivak and E. D. Hirsch, and the novelists William H. Gass and Thomas Pynchon were among his students. He was elected a Fellow of the American Academy of Arts and Sciences in 1963 and a member of the American Philosophical Society in 1973. In 1981, Northwestern University awarded him an honorary Doctor of Humane Letters. As of March 4, 2008, he was Class of 1916 Professor of English Emeritus there.

== Personal life ==
His wife of 71 years, Ruth, predeceased him in 2008. He turned 100 in July 2012. Abrams died on April 21, 2015, in Ithaca, New York, at the age of 102.

== The Mirror and the Lamp ==
Abrams offers evidence that until the Romantics, literature was typically understood as a mirror reflecting the real world in some kind of mimesis; whereas for the Romantics, writing was more like a lamp: the light of the writer's inner soul spilled out to illuminate the world. In 1998, Modern Library ranked The Mirror and the Lamp one of the 100 greatest English-language nonfiction books of the 20th century.

== The Norton Anthology of English Literature ==
Abrams was the general editor of The Norton Anthology of English Literature, as well as the editor of that anthology entitled The Romantic Period (1798–1832) where he evaluated writers and their reputations. For example, in his introduction to Lord Byron, he emphasizes how Byronism relates to Nietzsche's idea of the superman, and in the introduction to Percy Bysshe Shelley, Abrams says, "The tragedy of Shelley's short life was that intending always the best, he brought disaster and suffering upon himself and those he loved."

=== Classification of literary theories ===
From The Mirror and the Lamp

Literary theories, Abrams argues, can be divided into four main groups:

- Mimetic Theories (interested in the relationship between the Work and the Universe)
- Pragmatic Theories (interested in the relationship between the Work and the Audience)
- Expressive Theories (interested in the relationship between the Work and the Artist)
- Objective Theories (interested in close reading of the Work)

== Works ==
- The Mirror and the Lamp: Romantic Theory and the Critical Tradition (1953) ISBN 978-0-19-501471-6
- The Poetry of Pope: A Selection (1954) ISBN 978-0-88295-067-9
- Literature and Belief: English Institute Essays, 1957 (1957) editor ISBN 978-0-231-02278-1
- A Glossary of Literary Terms (Geoffrey Harpham, 1957; 9th ed. 2009) ISBN 978-1-4130-3390-8
- English Romantic Poets: Modern Essays in Criticism (1960) ISBN 978-0-19-501946-9
- The Norton Anthology of English Literature (1962) founding editor, many later editions
- The Milk of Paradise: The Effect of Opium Visions on the Works of DeQuincey, Crabbe, Francis Thompson, and Coleridge (1970) ISBN 978-0-374-90028-1
- Natural Supernaturalism: Tradition and Revolution in Romantic Literature (1971) ISBN 978-0-393-00609-4
- The Correspondent Breeze: Essays on English Romanticism (1984) ISBN 978-0-393-30340-7
- Doing Things With Texts: Essays in Criticism and Critical Theory (1989) ISBN 978-0-393-02713-6
- The Fourth Dimension of a Poem and Other Essays (2012) ISBN 978-0-393-05830-7

== Bibliography ==
- Lawrence Lipking, editor (1981) High Romantic Argument: Essays For M.H. Abrams ISBN 978-0-8014-1307-0
