= The Norton Anthology of English Literature =

Literature anthology

- Cover of eighth edition
- Language: English
- Genre: Anthology, English literature
- Published: 1962
- Publisher: W. W. Norton & Company
- Publication place: United States

The Norton Anthology of English Literature is an anthology of English literature published by W. W. Norton & Company, one of several such compendiums. First published in 1962, it has gone through ten editions; as of 2006 there were over eight million copies in print, making it the publisher's best-selling anthology. M. H. Abrams, a critic and scholar of Romanticism, served as General Editor for its first seven editions, before handing the job to Stephen Greenblatt, a Shakespeare scholar and Harvard professor. The anthology provides an overview of poetry, drama, prose fiction, essays, and letters from Beowulf to the beginning of the 21st century.

== Format ==
=== 1st edition ===
The first edition of The Norton Anthology of English Literature, published in 1962, comprises two volumes. Also printed in 1962 was a single-volume derivative edition, called The Norton Anthology of English Literature: Major Authors Edition, which contained reprintings with some additions and changes including 28 of the major authors appearing in the original edition.

=== 2nd edition ===
The second edition of The Norton Anthology of English Literature, published in 1968, also comprises two volumes.

=== 3rd edition ===
The third edition of The Norton Anthology of English Literature, printed in 1974, also comprises two volumes. Volume 1 (2,521 pages with a 27-page preface) is divided into four parts: The Middle Ages (edited by E. Talbot Donaldson), The Sixteenth Century (edited by Hallett Smith), The Seventeenth Century (edited by Robert M. Adams), and The Restoration and the Eighteenth Century (edited by Samuel Holt Monk and Lawrence Lipking). It added for the first time the complete text of Shakespeare's King Lear and Webster's Duchess of Malfi. Volume 2 (2,516 pages, with a 37-page preface) is divided into three parts: The Romantic Period (edited by M. H. Abrams), The Victorian Age (edited by George H. Ford), and The Twentieth Century (edited by David Daiches). It added for the first time the complete text of two short novels, Conrad's Heart of Darkness and D.H. Lawrence's The Fox.

=== 7th edition ===
The seventh edition of The Norton Anthology of English Literature comprised six volumes, sold in two sets of three. The first set included the volumes "The Middle Ages", "The Sixteenth Century and The Early Seventeenth Century", and "Restoration and the Eighteenth Century"; the second set included "The Romantic Period", "The Victorian Age", and "The Twentieth Century and After". The writings are arranged by author, with each author presented chronologically by date of birth. Historical and biographical information is provided in a series of headnotes for each author and in introductions for each of the time periods.

Within this structure, the anthology incorporates a number of thematically linked "clusters" of texts pertaining to significant contemporary concerns. For example, "The Sixteenth Century and The Early Seventeenth Century" contains four such clusters under the headings, "Literature of The Sacred", "The Wider World", "The Science of Self and World", and "Voices of the War". The first of these includes four contemporary English translations of an identical passage from the Bible, those of William Tyndale, the Geneva Bible, the Douay–Rheims Version, and the Authorized (King James) Version; selections from the writings of influential Protestant thinkers of the period, including Tyndale, John Calvin, Anne Askew, John Foxe and Richard Hooker; as well as selections from the Book of Common Prayer and the Book of Homilies.

The seventh edition was also sold in two volumes, which simply compressed six eras into two larger volumes, each volume comprising three eras. Volume 1 comprised the selection of literature from "'The Middle Ages" to the "English Restoration and the Eighteenth Century", while Volume 2 included the selection of literature from "The Romantic Period" to "The Twentieth Century and After".

Another option was the "Major Authors" edition. Compressed into the single volume was a selection of major authors of each period, from the anonymous author of Beowulf to J. M. Coetzee.

=== 9th edition ===
The ninth edition continued to be sold in the same format as the eighth edition.

=== 10th edition ===
The tenth edition of the anthology went on sale in June 2018 and has continued to be sold in the same format as its two prior editions, while adding a host of new writers to its already eclectic range.

=== 11th edition ===
The eleventh edition was prepared by seven scholars and went on sale in 2024. It comprises two packages with three volumes each and is also available in a shorter edition with only two volumes covering the period from the Middle Ages to the 21st century. The anthology is also available as an ebook with embedded videos and other enhanced features on a platform hosted by W. W. Norton.

== History ==
Published in 1962, the first edition of Norton Anthology was based on the English literature survey course that Abrams and fellow editor David Daiches taught at Cornell University. The anthology underwent periodic revisions. The fifth edition in 1986 included the addition of the full texts of James Joyce's "The Dead". The sixth edition, published in 1993, included Nadine Gordimer and Fleur Adcock. The seventh edition added Seamus Heaney's translation of Beowulf, Shakespeare's Twelfth Night, and Chinua Achebe's novel Things Fall Apart.

Greenblatt joined the editorial team during the 1990s: "When Norton asked Greenblatt—who was already editor of 'The Norton Shakespeare'—to join the team as Abrams's deputy in the mid-90s, Abrams said he was initially skeptical because of their different critical approaches, but quickly came around. The two had first met in the 1980s, when they once delivered opposing lectures. 'It was great fun,' Abrams said. 'He always claimed that I bent his sword. I always claimed he had the better, not of the argument, but of the rhetoric of the argument.'" Another addition has been an increase in the number of women authors: "The new edition, Greenblatt said, includes 68 women writers, more than eight times as many as in the first edition."

The ninth edition was released in 2012, marking 50 years of the anthology's existence.

== Competing anthologies ==
The 1970s saw the emergence of The Oxford Anthology of English Literature; its editorial team included leading scholars Harold Bloom, Frank Kermode, and Lionel Trilling. It was discontinued. Bloom, a former student of Abrams', noted: "We were defeated in battle."

The Longman Anthology of British Literature is also a competitor. Of this relationship, Joyce Jensen of The New York Times wrote in 1999, "The first stone in the war between Longman and W. W. Norton, the David and Goliath of the anthology publishing world, has been cast. With the recent publication of The Longman Anthology of British Literature, Longman has mounted a challenge to Norton to become the literary anthology of choice in colleges and universities around the country." Longman Anthology editor David Damrosch commented on the seventh edition of The Norton Anthology, arguing:

Though I could wish that the new edition of the Norton had reflected more independent thought and less reactive borrowing of the most visible innovations of our table of contents, I am very glad that Norton has now also adopted the six-volume format. Then again, perhaps the Norton hasn't simply been imitating us in its rapid inclusions of Marie de France, Hogarth, The Beggar's Opera, Frankenstein, and a range of new context groupings whose topics track ours with what may only appear to be beagle-like devotion. The Septuagint was produced by independent translators whose versions all came out alike, and this history may have repeated itself here.

The Norton Anthology responded that:

The new Norton is not (as Longman personnel have charged) simply an attempt to copy Longman... Norton has defined its scope by uniting works whose common bond is the English language, claiming that a shared vocabulary is essential to cultural unity.

Independent Canadian publisher Broadview Press also offers a six-volume anthology of British literature that competes with the Norton and Longman anthologies, and a two-volume Concise Edition that competes with Norton's two-volume Major Authors Edition and Longman's two-volume Masters of British Literature. The editorial team for The Broadview Anthology of British Literature includes leading scholars such as Kate Flint, Jerome J. McGann, and Anne Lake Prescott and has in general been very well received, though its sales have yet to match those of the competitors from the two larger publishers.

== Reception ==
In 2006, Rachel Donadio of The New York Times stated: "Although assailed by some for being too canonical and by others for faddishly expanding the reading list, the anthology has prevailed over the years, due in large part to the talents of Abrams, who refined the art of stuffing 13 centuries of literature into 6,000-odd pages of wispy cigarette paper."

Sarah A. Kelen summarizes the changes to the NAEL's inclusions of medieval literature through successive editions, demonstrating the way the Anthology's contents reflect contemporary scholarship.

Sean Shesgreen, an English professor at Northern Illinois University, published a critical history of the anthology in the Winter 2009 issue of Critical Inquiry, based on interviews with Abrams and examinations of the editor's NAEL files. Norton president Drake McFeely forcefully denounced the article in a January 23, 2009, story in The Chronicle of Higher Education.
