= Christopher Newfield =

American academician and writer

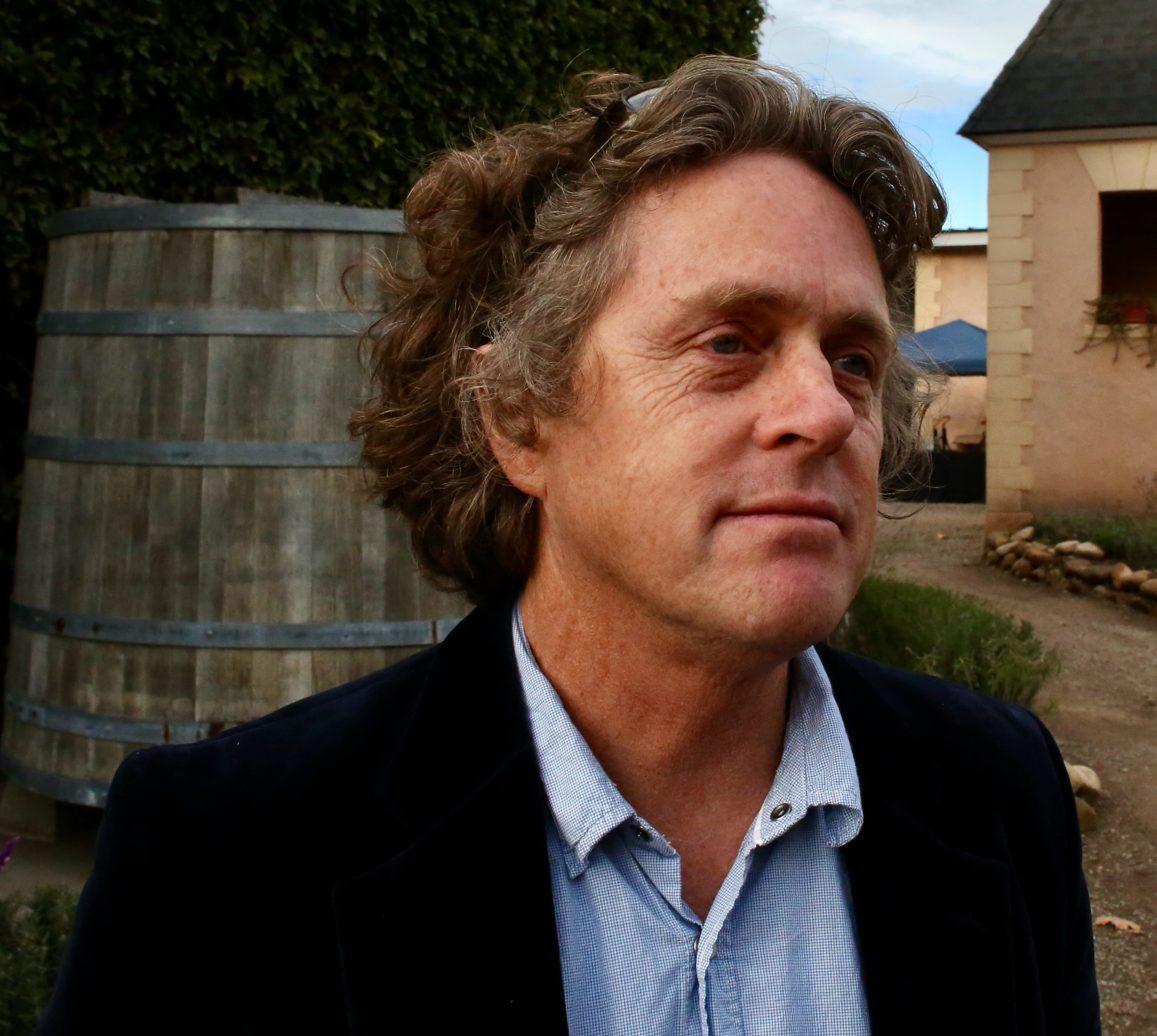
Newfield in 2012

Christopher J. Newfield is an American academician and writer. He is Director of Research at the Independent Social Research Foundation in London, and until 2020 was Distinguished Professor of English at the University of California, Santa Barbara. Newfield is the author of a number of books and many papers in the following areas of research: Critical University Studies, quantification studies, the intellectual and social effects of the humanities, contemporary U.S. cultural history, and the relation between humanities knowledge and artificial intelligence. His book The Great Mistake (Johns Hopkins U. Press, 2016) was welcomed as a "timely, persuasive" warning against the evolving trend of privatization that led to "anti-egalitarian policy choices" affecting public funding of higher education in the US.

== Education ==
Newfield graduated with a BA from Reed College in 1980. This was followed by an MA from Cornell University in 1984, and a PhD from the same institution in 1988.

== Career ==
In 1987, Newfield became an assistant professor of English at Rice University and then joined the Department of English at UC Santa Barbara as an assistant professor in 1989. In 1994-95 he was active in the campaign to retain affirmative action programs at the University of California, and in 1999 wrote the first of a series of policy reports for the University: on racial disparities in UCSB hiring (1999); technology transfer (2001); and on the negative effects of cuts to public funding, including tuition hikes that damage student access and affordability without fixing the university's finances (2007, 2008).

His first book was on Ralph Waldo Emerson, where he addressed the authoritarian patterns of U.S. culture in relation to race, gender, sexuality, and capitalism through the concept of "submissive individualism." He then wrote a trilogy of books on the U.S. university as a social institution, studying the capitulation of humanism to managerialism (Ivy and Industry), the abandonment of "middle-class" egalitarian expansionism when it began to include communities of color (Unmaking the Public University), and the education-destroying effects of university managers' acceptance of the rules of neoliberalism (The Great Mistake).

In 2016 he helped to create an international consortium to study quantification ("The Limits of the Numerical"), where he analyzed how the misuse of numbers damages democracy. From 2008 to 2011, he was director of the UC Education Abroad Programs for Lyon, Grenoble, Bordeaux and Paris. Together with Michael Meranze, he published the blog Remaking the University from 2008 to 2022, producing 977 posts on various issues in higher education.

== Books ==
- Newfield, Christopher and Ron Strickland (1995). After Political Correctness: The Humanities And Society In The 1990s. Boulder, CO: Westview. ISBN 978-0-8133-2337-4.
- Newfield, Christopher (1996). The Emerson effect: individualism and submission in America. Chicago: The Univ. of Chicago Pr. ISBN 978-0-226-57698-5.
- Gordon, Avery F., Newfield C (1997). Mapping multiculturalism (2. print ed.). Minneapolis: Univ. of Minnesota Press. ISBN 978-0-8166-2546-8.
- Newfield, Christopher (2003). Ivy and industry: business and the making of the American university, 1880-1980. Durham, NC: Duke Univ. Press. ISBN 978-0-8223-3201-5.
- Newfield, Christopher (2011). Unmaking the public university: the forty-year assault on the middle class (Paperback edition ed.). Cambridge, Massachusetts London, England: Harvard University Press. ISBN 978-0-674-06036-4.
- Newfield, Christopher (2018). The great mistake: how we wrecked public universities and how we can fix them. Critical university studies (Paperback edition ed.). Baltimore: Johns Hopkins University Press. ISBN 978-1-4214-2703-4.
- Newfield, Christopher; Alexandrova, Anna; John, Stephen, eds. (2022). Limits of the numerical: the abuses and uses of quantification. Chicago London: The University of Chicago Press. ISBN 978-0-226-81715-6.
- Bleemer, Zachary; Kumar, Mukul; Mehta, Aashish; Muellerleile, Christopher; Newfield, Christopher (2023). Metrics that matter: student life in the quantified university. Baltimore: Johns Hopkins University Press. ISBN 978-1-4214-4573-1.
