= Mary D. Herter Norton =

American publisher

Margaret Dows Herter Norton Crena de Iongh (née Herter; 1894–1985), known as Mary D. Herter Norton when she co-founded W. W. Norton & Company with her first husband, William Warder Norton, was an American publisher, violinist, and translator. She was known as M. D. Herter Norton for her work as a violinist and translator. Under the name M. D. Herter Norton, she translated from German about a dozen volumes of the poetry of Rainer Maria Rilke. Norton is noted for her dedication to giving "the closest idiomatic parallel" in her translation of Rilke poems. Among the translators working in her time, she was on the extreme end of being faithful to the "image, symbol, and elements of language" to the loss of the "technical elements of form" that would make a text a "living poems". Instead she offers the reader a literary aid to understand Rilke's words that accompany her line by line translation. Her second husband, Daniel Crena de Iongh, was an Executive Director and treasurer of the World Bank. Mary Dows Herter Norton was also known as “Polly”. She and her husband William Warder Norton had one child, Anne Aston Warder Norton Jones, born 1928 -1977.
