= The Minnesota Review =

American literary magazine

- Editor: Janell Watson
- Categories: Literary magazine
- Frequency: Biannually
- Publisher: Duke University Press
- First issue: 1960
- Country: United States
- Website: read.dukeupress.edu/the-minnesota-review/list-of-years
- ISSN: 0026-5667 (print); 2157-4189 (web)

The Minnesota Review is a literary magazine covering literary and cultural studies which places a special emphasis on politically engaged criticism, fiction, and poetry. Issues are often "themed," recent issues examining the nature of academic publishing, of academic celebrity, and of "smart" working class kids' experiences as adults or children within the educational system. The Minnesota Review is currently based at Virginia Tech in Blacksburg, Virginia, and edited by the MFA program. The journal is published by Duke University Press.

== History ==
The Minnesota Review was established in 1960 in Minnesota. Some of the early editors were from Macalester College, but early issues have a disclaimer against affiliation with any university. The magazine was oriented toward publishing avant garde fiction, poetry, and graphic work. From 1982, edited by Fred Pfeil and Michael Sprinker, it began to acquire the Marxist overtones and emphasis on literary theory for which it would later be known. Under the editorship of Jeffrey J. Williams, it moved from explicit Marxism toward politically conscious cultural studies.

== Editors ==
The following persons have been editor-in-chief of the magazine:

Years	Editor-in-chief	Years	Editor-in-chief
early 60s	Sarah Foster and Neil Myers	1982–1986	Fred Pfeil and Michael Sprinker
mid/late 60s	Roy Arthur Swanson	1986–1992	Michael Sprinker
1967–1973	Alvin Greenberg	1992-2010	Jeffrey J. Williams
1973–1982	Roger Mitchell	2010-present	Janell Watson

== See also ==
- List of literary magazines
