= Critical university studies =

Critical theory examining the role of higher education

Critical university studies is a field examining the role of higher education in contemporary society and its relation to culture, politics, and labor. Arising primarily from cultural studies, it applies critical theory toward the university since the 1970s, particularly the shift away from a strong public model of higher education to a neoliberal privatized model. Emerging largely in the United States, which has the most extensive system of higher education, the field has also seen significant work in the United Kingdom, as well as in other countries where neoliberalism is or is becoming an important societal and political force. Key themes of CUS research are corporatization, academic labor, and student debt, among other issues.

Like those doing research under the banner of critical legal studies (CLS), scholars of Critical University Studies often have an activist bent. CLS and CUS both analyze powerful institutions in order to draw attention to structural inequalities and embedded practices of exploitation and marginalization. In addition, both fields seek to move beyond abstract theorizing, targeting institutional practices and making proposals for policy changes.

In contrast to CLS, which has roots in elite institutions like Harvard and Yale, CUS largely comes out of public colleges and universities. While CLS has tended to seek remedies in the legal system, CUS has gravitated toward student and labor union movements. Moreover, CUS has emphasized investigative reportage and exposés of current institutional policies and practices alongside academic work. Rather than a uniform group, CUS includes a range of scholars, critics, and activists, among them tenured professors, graduate students, and adjunct instructors.

== History ==
The term critical university studies was first defined by Jeffrey J. Williams in the 2012 article titled "An Emerging Field Deconstructs Academe", published in The Chronicle of Higher Education. Williams described the "new wave of criticism of higher education" that came to the fore in the 1990s and has gained momentum in the ensuing decades. This new work has primarily come from literary and cultural critics, as well as those in education, history, sociology, and labor studies. Williams noted that criticism of higher education has a strong tradition, and scholars like Heather Steffen have traced CUS's lineage at least to the early 20th century, for example to Thorstein Veblen's The Higher Learning in America: A Memorandum on the Conduct of Universities by Business Men (1918) and Upton Sinclair's The Goose-Step: A Study of American Education (1923), which criticize the influence of business principles and Gilded Age wealth on the emerging American university system.

In addition, the 1960s saw a great deal of criticism of social institutions, and much focused on university campuses. Students for a Democratic Society (SDS) started with a strong statement about higher education, and anti-war and civil rights protests were a major presence on US campuses. The critical pedagogy movement, inspired by Paolo Freire and furthered by Henry Giroux and others, arose from this moment. The feminist movement also played a role in criticism of the university during the 1960s and 1970s, with activists like Adrienne Rich calling for "a women-centered university."

In 1980, the Bayh–Dole Act granted American universities the right to patent their inventions, thereby encouraging them to conduct research with business aims in mind. In the late 1990s and early 2000s, critics began to address the new direction of higher education, often coming from the graduate student unionization movement. Some met in conferences such as “Reworking/Rethinking the University” at the University of Minnesota (2008–11), or came out of groups such as Edu-factory, which was inspired by the Italian autonomist movement.

This first wave of CUS publications addressed the corporatization of higher education, along with the exploitation of academic labor and the rise of student debt. Key texts from this period include Sheila Slaughter and Larry Leslie's Academic Capitalism: Politics, Policies, and the Entrepreneurial University (1997), David Noble's Digital Diploma Mills: The Automation of Higher Education (2001), Marc Bousquet's “The Waste Product of Graduate Education” (2002) and How the University Works: Higher Education and the Low-Wage Nation (2008). In addition, Steal This University: The Rise of the Corporate University and the Academic Labor Movement, edited by Benjamin Johnson et al. (2003), Stefano Harney and Fred Moten's “The University and the Undercommons" (2004), Williams’ “The Post-Welfare State University” (2006) and “Student Debt and the Spirit of Indenture” (2008), and Christopher Newfield's Unmaking the Public University: The Forty-Year Assault on the Middle Class (2008).

More recently, a second wave of CUS scholars have widened the field's scope to address issues including universities’ reliance on proprietorial technology, the dominance of entrepreneurial values, and globalization. Notable texts in this vein include Newfield's The Great Mistake: How We Wrecked Public Universities and How We Can Fix Them (2016), Michael Fabricant and Stephen Brier's Austerity Blues: Fighting for the Soul of Public Higher Education (2016), Benjamin Ginsberg's The Fall of the Faculty: The Rise of the All-Administrative University and Why It Matters (2011), Robert Samuels’ Why Public Higher Education Should Be Free: How to Decrease Cost and Increase Quality at American Universities (2013). In addition, Jacob Rooksby's The Branding of the American Mind (2016), Avery Wiscomb's “The Entrepreneurship Racket” (2016), and Heather Steffen's "Inventing Our University: Student-Faculty Collaboration in Critical University Studies” (2017).

In addition, after Britain adopted neoliberal policies and raised tuitions from minor fees to major levels, critics such as Stefan Collini, in “Browne’s Gamble” (2010), and Andrew McGettigan, in The Great University Gamble: Money, Markets, and the Future of Higher Education (2013), focused on the United Kingdom. Meng-Hsuan Chou, Isaac Kamola, and Tamson Pietsch's edited volume The Transnational Politics of Higher Education (2016) looks at globalization.

== Key themes ==
Although continually responding to new trends in higher education, Critical University Studies has so far concerned itself with several key themes:

- Privatization and Corporatization: CUS research shows the various ways that public investment in universities has decreased as costs have been shifted to students and their families. As a 2014 report from public policy organization Demos shows, state funding for higher education has progressively decreased since the 1980s. At the same time, universities appear to be acting more and more like corporations, enhancing managerial administration, cutting full-time faculty labor, and treating students like customers. The result is a higher education system that functions as “a mercantile market rather than a public realm apart from the market,” with those attending reconfigured “as job seekers rather than as citizens” — a dramatic alteration from the liberal humanistic university of the postwar US.
- Labor: According to the New Faculty Majority, a US-based adjunct advocacy group that formed in 2009, three quarters of college faculty are now off the tenure track, with no access to the job stability that universities historically provided. Of this group, over half are adjunct or part-time workers, positions characterized by low wages and lack of job security. CUS takes issue with this new norm of precarious labor, as well as with the increasing burden on graduate students to take on heavy teaching loads. As such, CUS has organic connections to graduate student unionization and adjunct labor organization efforts.
- Student Debt: In 2015, 68% of graduating students in the US left college with some student loan debt. This marks a dramatic increase from student debt during previous eras of higher education, a development that CUS attributes to the effects of neoliberal policies on universities. For one thing, higher education now tends to be framed as a private endeavor rather than as a public service, a shift that has resulted in reductions to state funding and subsequent increases in tuition costs. Since 1980, the cost of a college degree has increased nearly 1000% (while the price of consumer goods has increased only about 250%). This has been exacerbated by a shift in policy for for-profit institutions: Since the late 1990s, they have been able to receive up to 90% of their funding from federal aid, and they now represent around 25% of loan debt. In addition to raising awareness about the issue of growing student debt, CUS scholars push for policy changes, such as loan forgiveness and debt-free college.
- Globalization: American universities are increasingly being exported to locations around the globe through the opening of satellite and affiliate campuses. This practice—exemplified by schools like New York University, Carnegie Mellon University, and Duke University—often seems to be profit-driven rather than beneficent, with universities receiving large sums of money from local governments in exchange for the presence of the school's brand. For many scholars, the so-called “global university” is merely a perpetuation of Western hegemony.
- Innovation and Entrepreneurship: A new wave of CUS research has drawn attention to the increasing emphasis that universities place on values of innovation and entrepreneurship. While this focus may seem harmless or even beneficial to students, CUS scholars point out the damaging effects of structuring student's college experience around these buzzwords. Both terms reflect the infiltration of a business mindset into academics, with “innovation” often entailing the mechanization of teaching and a subsequent increase in inequality among student populations. Similarly, entrepreneurship encourages students to adopt a corporate work ethos, with science and tech companies—and increasingly Silicon Valley billionaires—reaping the benefits of student labor.

== Influence ==
Critical University Studies research has contributed to student and faculty movements across US campuses, including the aforementioned New Faculty Majority, the graduate student union movement, Oregon's CORE faculty-student advocacy group, and the Occupy Student Debt Campaign (on which cultural critic Andrew Ross has worked).

CUS scholars often publish outside of traditional academic outlets, through blogs like Michael Meranze and Christopher Newfield's Remaking the University, as well as through contributions to new media like Jacobin, the Los Angeles Review of Books (LARB), Salon and HuffPost. Through such non-traditional outlets, as well as through book publications and academic journal articles, CUS has helped to bring issues like student debt into the mainstream political conversation.

=== Unionization ===
Alongside CUS criticism and activism in the 1990s, U.S. campuses saw a rise in unionization efforts. This culminated in a 2000 decision by the National Labor Relations Board (NLRB) that graduate employees were protected by the National Labor Relations Act and could unionize. Union efforts proliferated following this decision, with organizations like the United Automobile Workers (UAW) and the Service Employees International Union (SEIU) allying with graduate students and adjunct instructors in the fight for employee status and collective bargaining rights. Despite setbacks, including a 2004 reversal of the 2000 ruling, student and adjunct unions have made significant headway. In August 2016, the NLRB reversed itself again, ruling that graduate research and teaching assistants at private universities do have the right to unionize (UAW vs. Columbia).

== Developments ==
The journal Workplace: A Journal for Academic Labor, co-founded by Bousquet, stemmed from early efforts in the field and continues to publish open-access issues around themes of academic labor and higher education activism. In addition, 2015 saw the formation of Academic Labor: Research and Artistry, a journal devoted to issues of tenure and contingency in the university. In book publishing, The Johns Hopkins University Press initiated a book series on Critical University Studies, edited by Jeffrey J. Williams and Christopher Newfield, and In the UK, Palgrave also launched a series on CUS, edited by John Smyth.

On the whole, the stance of CUS against the status quo of US universities puts it at odds with individuals and administrators who are in favor of the continued privatization, corporatization, and globalization of the university.

Scholars like Williams, Steffen, and others continue to call for the incorporation of CUS into the undergraduate curriculum, encouraging students to think critically about the institutions in which they find themselves.
