= Fred Pfeil =

American author

John Frederick Pfeil (1949–2005) was an American literary critic and novelist. Pfeil (pronounced "file") was born September 21 in Port Allegany, Pennsylvania. He earned an undergraduate degree at Amherst College in 1971 and an M.A. at Stanford University in 1973. He taught at Stanford, Stephens College, Oregon State University, and Trinity College (Connecticut).

Pfeil was diagnosed with melanoma in February 2005 and died in Hartford, Connecticut on 29 November 2005.

== Works ==
- Goodman 2020, novel (Bloomington: Indiana University Press, 1986)
- Shine On and Other Stories, short stories (Amherst: Lynx House Press, 1987)
- Another Tale to Tell: Politics and Narrative in Post-Modern Culture, nonfiction (New York: Verso, 1990)
- What They Tell You to Forget, a novella and short stories (Wainscott: Pushcart Press, 1996)
- White Guys: Studies in Postmodern Domination and Difference, nonfiction (New York: Verso, 1995)
