= W. W. Norton & Company =

American publishing company

- Status: Active
- Founded: 1923; 103 years ago
- Founders: William Warder Norton; Mary Dows Herter Norton
- Country of origin: United States
- Headquarters location: 500 Fifth Avenue, New York City, New York
- Distribution: self-distributed (US); Penguin Random House (Canada trade); Nelson Canada (Canada textbooks); John Wiley & Sons (UK, Australia)
- Key people: Julia A. Reidhead (President)
- Publication types: Books
- Imprints: Countryman; Liveright; Norton Professional; Norton Young Readers
- No. of employees: 500
- Official website: wwnorton.com

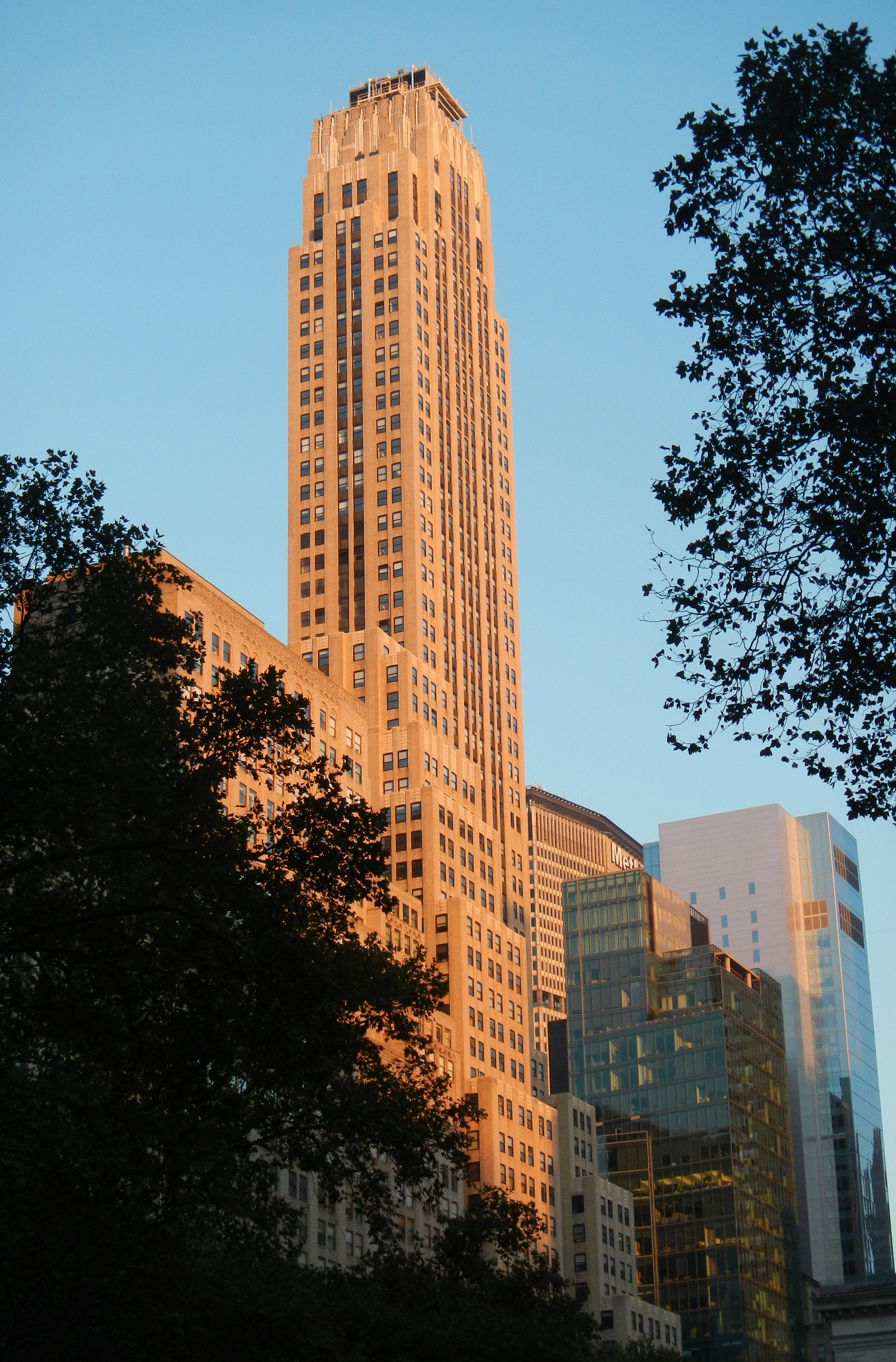
500 Fifth Avenue, the headquarters of W. W. Norton and Company

W. W. Norton & Company is an American publishing company based in New York City. Established in 1923, it has been owned wholly by its employees since the early 1960s. The company is known for its Norton Anthologies (particularly The Norton Anthology of English Literature) and its texts in the Norton Critical Editions series, both of which are frequently assigned in university literature courses.

== History and overview ==
The roots of the company date to 1923, when William Warder Norton founded the firm with his wife Mary Dows Herter Norton, and became its first president. In the 1960s, Mary Norton offered most of her stock to its leading editors and managers. Storer D. Lunt took over in 1945 after Norton's death, and was succeeded by George Brockway (1957–1976), Donald S. Lamm (1976–1994), W. Drake McFeely (1994–2017), and Julia A. Reidhead (2017–present). Reidhead was vice president and publishing director of Norton's College division and a former editor of the Norton Anthologies.

Imprints of W. W. Norton include Norton Professional Books (professional works in mental health, well-being, architecture and design, and education), Countryman Press (lifestyle and instructional books, including healthy-living, cookbooks, and hiking guides), Liveright (20th century classics and new works), and Norton Young Readers (books for preschoolers to young adults).

In 2023, the company celebrated its 100th anniversary.

== Series ==
=== Norton Anthologies ===
Norton Anthologies collect canonical works from various literatures; perhaps the best known anthology in the series is the Norton Anthology of English Literature, which, as of 2018, is in its 10th edition. Norton Anthologies offer general headnotes on each author, a general introduction to each period of literature, and annotations for every anthologized text.

=== Norton Critical Editions ===
Like Oxford World's Classics and Penguin Classics, Norton Critical Editions provide reprints of classic literature and, in some cases, classic non-fiction works. However, unlike most critical editions, all Norton Critical Editions are sourcebooks that provide a selection of contextual documents and critical essays along with an edited text. Annotations to the text are provided as footnotes, rather than as endnotes.

=== The States and the Nation ===
The States and the Nation series was published in celebration of the United States Bicentennial. It comprised 51 volumes, one for each state and the District of Columbia. The series was administered by the American Association for State and Local History via a grant from the National Endowment for the Humanities.

== Notable authors ==
- Dean Acheson
- A. R. Ammons
- Diane Ackerman
- J. G. Ballard
- Andrea Barrett
- Vincent Bugliosi
- Pete Buttigieg
- Kate Brown
- Jared Diamond
- Rita Dove
- John Dower
- Andre Dubus III
- Stephen Dunn
- Erik Erikson
- Eric Foner
- Nadine Gordimer
- Annette Gordon-Reed
- Stephen Greenblatt
- Pekka Hämäläinen
- Seamus Heaney
- Sam Harris
- Carl Jung
- Sebastian Junger
- Eric Kandel
- Mervyn King
- Nicole Krauss
- Paul Krugman
- Maxine Kumin
- Stanley Kunitz
- Joseph P. Lash
- Michael Lewis
- David Daokui Li
- Howard Markel
- William S. McFeely
- Larry McMurtry
- John Matteson
- John Mearsheimer
- Edmund Morgan
- Patrick O'Brian
- Chuck Palahniuk
- Edmund Phelps
- Robert Pinsky
- Gustave Reese
- Adrienne Rich
- Mary Roach
- Russell Shorto
- Jonathan D. Spence
- Joseph Stiglitz
- William Taubman
- Alan Taylor
- Neil deGrasse Tyson
- Harold E. Varmus
- Isser Woloch
- Sean Wilentz
- E. O. Wilson
- Emily Wilson
- Fareed Zakaria
- Hal Varian

== See also ==
- Oxford World's Classics
- Verso Book's Radical Thinkers
- Albatross Publishing House
- Boni & Liveright
- Robert Weil (editor)
