= Genzano di Roma =

- Comune
- Comune di Genzano di Roma
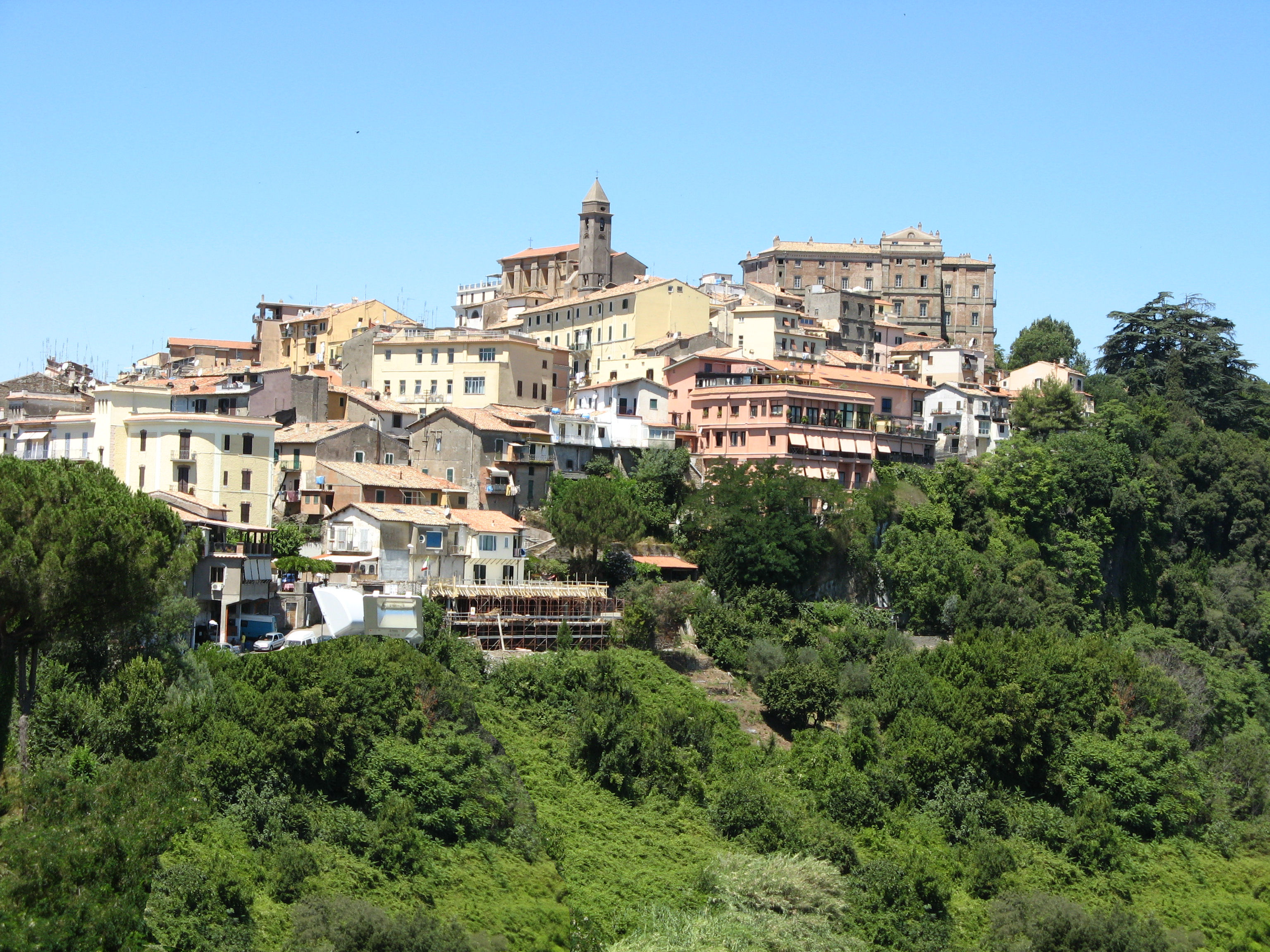
- Panorama of Genzano

- Coat of arms

- Location within Italy Location within Lazio
- Coordinates: 41°42′N 12°41′E
- Country: Italy
- Region: Lazio
- Metropolitan city: Rome (RM)
- Frazioni: Landi, Muti

Government
  - Mayor: Carlo Zoccolotti (PD)

Area
  - Total: 17.9 km^{2} (6.9 sq mi)
- Elevation: 435 m (1,427 ft)

Population (31 January 2022)
  - Total: 24,072
  - Density: 1,340/km^{2} (3,480/sq mi)
- Demonym: Genzanesi
- Time zone: UTC+1 (CET)
  - Summer (DST): UTC+2 (CEST)
- Postal code: 00045
- Dialing code: 06
- ISTAT code: 058043
- Patron saint: St. Thomas of Villanova
- Saint day: September 18th
- Website: Official website

Genzano di Roma is a town and comune in the Metropolitan City of Rome, in the Lazio region of Central Italy. It is one of the Castelli Romani, at a distance of 29 kilometres (18 mi) from Rome, in the Alban Hills.

== History ==
The origin of the name Genzano is still disputed. According to one version, the hill overlooking the Lake of Nemi on which the city is situated was once devoted to the goddess Cynthia, whose cult was associated to that of Diana Nemorensis. Another version relates its origin to the Gentiani family. For others the presence on the hills, at that time of the "tribus or gens Cynthia" originators and custodians of the cult of courage, in "Castrum Gentianum" from them the derivation of the name Genzano.

From Roman Republican times the area was inhabited by wealthy Roman citizens who wished to benefit from the cleaner air, uncontaminated water and cooler temperatures during the hot summer months. The remains of many ancient Roman villas are to be found in the surroundings. The most impressive being the walls of the "Villa of the Antonini" where the Roman emperor Antoninus Pius (r. 138–161 AD) was born. The Herculean Sarcophagus of Genzano, currently in the British Museum was found here.

In the 12th century a tower of the Genoese Gandolfi family, lord of Castel Gandolfo, existed in the site. In 1183 Pope Lucius III gave it to the Cistercian monks of St. Anastasius of Aquae Salviae in Rome. In 1235 they built a large castle around which the town later grew. In 1378 the Popes assigned it to Giordano Orsini. The Cistercians and the Colonna alternatively ruled Genzano until 1563, when the castle was ceded for 150,000 scudos to the Massimi, from which it was bought by Giuliano Cesarini.

Livia Cesarini, the last exponent of the family and wife of Francesco II Sforza, together with architect Giovanni Iacobini, designed and built Genzano Nuova (New Genzano) in 1708, according to the most modern urban planning of that time. The painter Maratti was one of the citizens who settled in Livia Sforza-Cesarini's new town.

In 1873 it was decided that the name of the town should be changed to Genzano di Roma to avoid confusion within the postal service as there are two towns in Italy called Genzano.

In the 19th and early 20th century it was seat of numerous peasant revolts; during World War II it suffered heavy damage under Allied bombings, which destroyed 90 percent of its buildings.

Genzano di Roma is famous for its rustic bread called pane di Genzano.

In 2022 it was chosen as one of the locations for the filming of Fast X, along with the City of Rome.

== Main sights ==
- Baronial Palace Sforza Cesarini
- The English garden of Palace Sforza Cesarini
- Church of St. Mary of the Capuchins
- Fountain of St. Sebastian
- Cathedral of St. Mary of the Hilltop

== Infiorata ==
In June, a folkloristic and religious exhibition, the "Infiorata" is held. A whole street (Via Italo Belardi) is covered with allegorical carpets of flowers and a masked parade walk on these, with medieval and traditional clothes realized by the town's women. The event was held for the first time in 1778. Each year the artists suggestions must conform to a previously agreed upon theme, such as "The Colours of Michelangelo", or "The Designs of Bernini". Recently, it has become a Spring tradition for children from the local schools to hold a "mini Infiorata."

== Twin cities ==
- Châtillon, France
- Merseburg, Germany
- Mokotów, Poland
- Vau-Dejës, Albania
