= Cádiz Memorial =

Memorial in London to the Siege of Cádiz

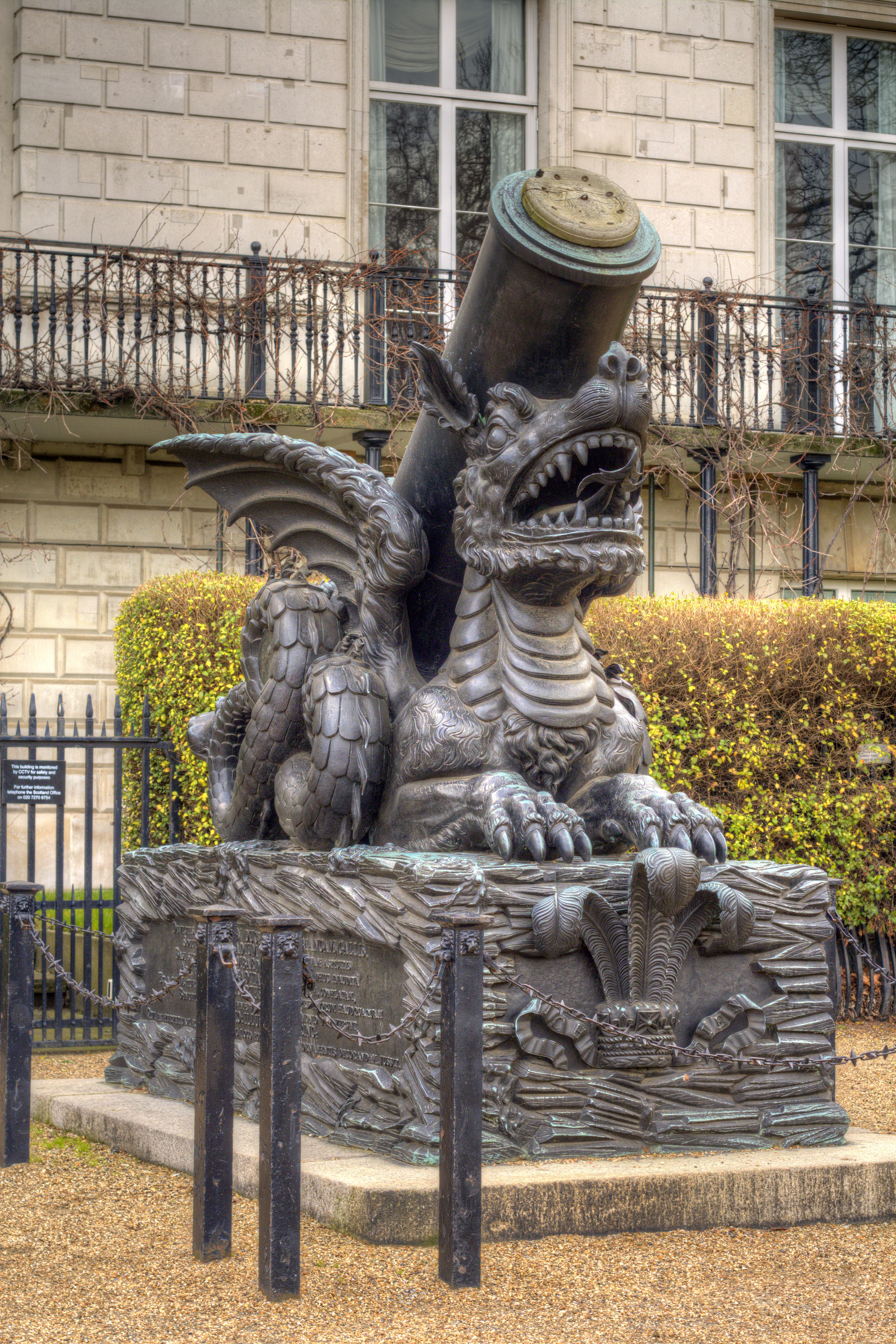
- The memorial in 2015
- Interactive map of Cádiz Memorial
- Location: London, SW1; United Kingdom
- Coordinates: 51.5042°N 0.1273°W
- Material: Brass, bronze
- Opening date: 1816; 210 years ago

The Cádiz Memorial, also known as the "Prince Regent's Bomb", is an early 19th-century French mortar mounted on a brass monster, located in Horse Guards Parade in Westminster, London. It was first "exposed to public view" on 12 August 1816 and has been classified as a Grade II listed building since 1 December 1987. The monument was a feature of many satirical verses and cartoons in the early 19th century, mainly because the word "bomb" – pronounced "bum" – gave it an immediate association with the notoriously corpulent Prince Regent's sizeable backside.

== Description ==
The mortar is mounted on the back of a large brass sculpture of Dante's reimagining of the monster Geryon (wrongly described as a "Chinese dragon" in some sources), associated with the Isle of Gades on which Cádiz stands, with twin tails twisting round to the vent of the mortar which it supports on its back. At the rear of the mortar is a sculpture of the dog Orthrus. Some liberties were taken with the classical depiction of Geryon, such as substituting wings for its multiple heads. The monster and mortar rest on a bed of brass measuring some 9 feet 2 inches (2.79 m) by 4 feet 6 inches (1.37 m), representing a rock on which the monster has alighted. The whole structure measures 9 feet 10 inches (3.00 m) high and weights 16 tons. On the north side of the bed is the following inscription:

DEVICTIS A WELLINGTON DUCE PROPE SALAMANCAM GALLIS,
SOLUTAQUE EXINDE GADIUM OBSIDIONE, HANC QUAM ASPICITIS
BASI SUPERIMPOSITAM BOMBARDAM, VI PRAEDITAM ADHUC INAUDITA,
AD URBEM PORTUMQUE GADITANUM DESTRUENDUM, CONFLATAM
ET A COPIIS TURBATIS RELICTAM, CORTES HISPANICI, PRISTINORUM HAUDQUAQUAM
BENEFICIORUM OBLITI, SUMMAE VENERATIONIS TESTIMONIO DONAVERUNT
GEORGIO: ILLUS: BRIT: PRINC:
QUI, IN PERPETUAM REI MEMORIAM, HOC LOCO PONENDAM, ET HIS ORNAMENTIS DECORANDAM, JUSSIT. .

which can be translated as:

The French having been defeated by the Duke of Wellington near Salamanca, and the siege of Cadiz having then been raised, this mortar that you are looking at, imposed on a base, endowed with hitherto unheard-of power, produced for the destruction of the city and port of Cadiz and abandoned by the disordered troops, the Spanish Parliament, by no means forgetful of their original benefits, have given, in testimony of their highest veneration, to George, illustrious British Prince, who, for the perpetual memory of the event, ordered it to be placed in this place and decorated with these ornaments.

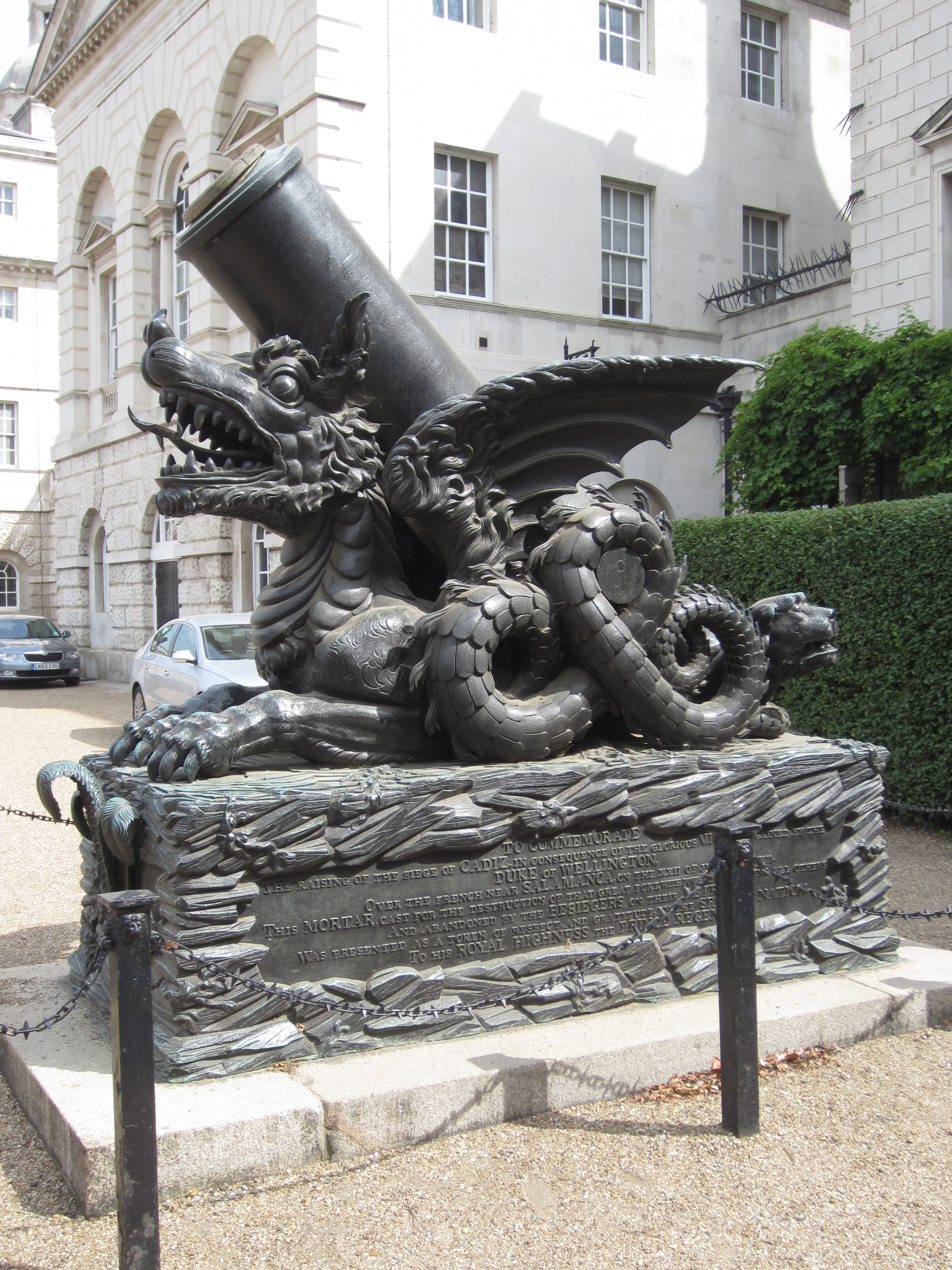
The memorial's south side, including an inscription on the base, in 2014

While on the south side the following inscription appears:

To commemorate
the Raising of the Siege of Cadiz, in consequence of the
Glorious Victory obtained by the
Duke of Wellington
over the French at Salamanca, on the 22d July 1812:
This Mortar, cast for the destruction of that Great Port,
with Powers surpassing all others,
and abandoned by the Besiegers on their Retreat,
was presented as a token of respect and gratitude by the
Spanish Nation,
To his Royal Highness the Prince Regent.

The Prince of Wales's feathers appear in high relief at the front of the bed, while at the rear is the inscription, "Constructed in the Royal Carriage Department. Earl of Mulgrave, Master General – A.D. 1814".

== History ==
=== Origins ===
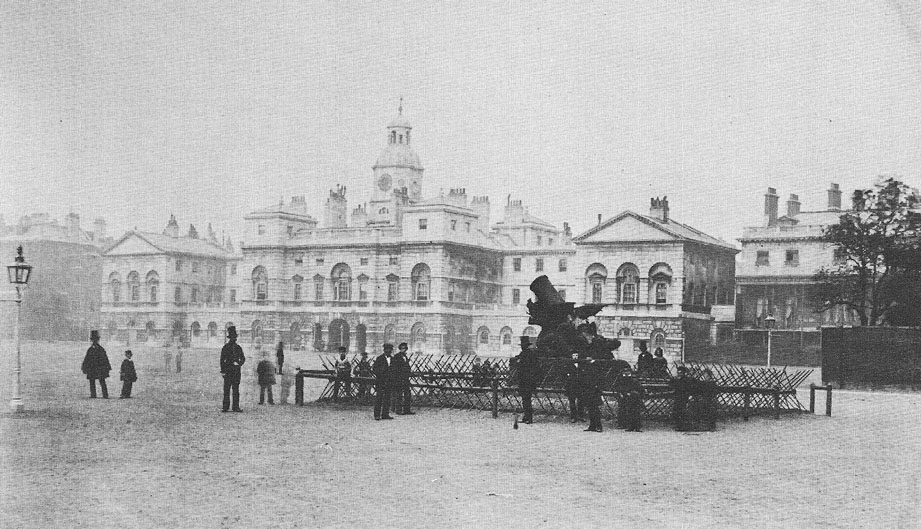
The memorial in its original location in 1860, with chevaux de frise surrounding it

The mortar was one of a number of giant siege weapons used by the French army under Marshal Soult during the two-year siege of Cádiz in Spain. Made in Seville in March 1811, it was spiked and abandoned when the French retreated after the Duke of Wellington's victory at the Battle of Salamanca in 1812. It was designed to be capable of throwing shells over what contemporaries described as "the immense distance" of 3 miles (4.8 km) and could actually reach a range of 3.5 miles (5.6 km). Although the mortar and its siblings were intended to serve essentially as terror weapons to compel the inhabitants of Cádiz to surrender, they were, however, ineffective and inaccurate weapons. The shells were said to be aimed "much at random, some of them falling short of the town, others flying completely over into the bay near the lighthouse on the other side, and some few ... falling in the city, but from which very few casualties occurred." According to one Royal Engineer who saw the mortar in action, he watched it fire a shot into the middle of the crowded Plaza de San Antonio in the centre of Cádiz "without injuring a single individual".

After the siege was lifted, the Spanish Regency presented one of the captured French mortars to Rear Admiral Arthur Kaye Legge. They requested that it might be placed in one of London's Royal Parks to commemorate the victory at Salamanca, the liberation of southern Spain and the exploits of the Duke of Wellington. The Prince Regent agreed and instructed the Earl of Mulgrave to procure a suitable carriage for the mortar and set it up in Horse Guards Parade. The royal carriage department at the Royal Arsenal, Woolwich, carried out the work, creating an elaborate allegorically sculpted bronze base for the weapon. It was unveiled on the Prince Regent's 54th birthday, situated on the south side of the parade ground behind a square of chevaux de frise. It was subsequently moved to its present position adjacent to the Horse Guards building.

=== The Regent's Tremendous Thing ===
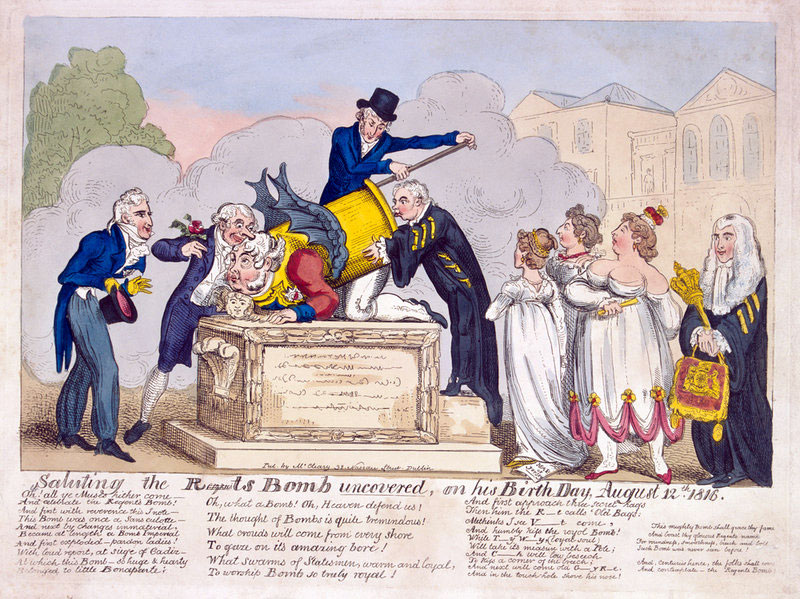
Saluting the Regent's Bomb Unveiled on his Birth-Day, August 12th, 1816, by George Cruikshank

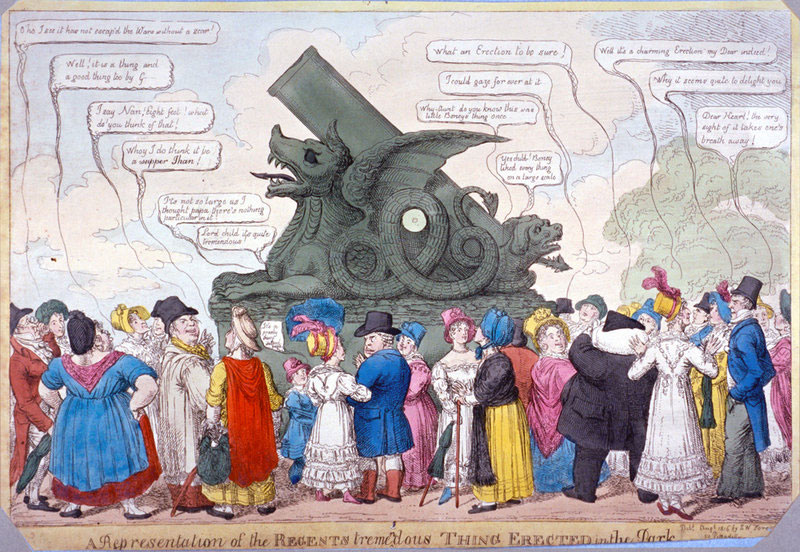
A Representation of the Regent's Tremendous Thing erected in the Park, by C. Williams

At the time, the slang term for a cannon or mortar was a "bomb", pronounced "bum". The Cádiz mortar was thus immediately nicknamed the "Regent's Bomb", prompting a flood of scatological puns associating it with the corpulent posterior of the Prince Regent. C. F. Lawler (fl. 1810), in his satirical poem The Regent's Bomb (The R----t's bomb! c. 1816) wrote (under his pseudonym Peter Pindar) of its report, its wind and "width, breadth and monstrous size" and predicted that the Poet Laureate would "sing the charming odour of the thing". The satirist William Hone celebrated its unveiling with a verse attacking the Prince Regent and his ministers, their names filleted in a mild form of censorship:

Oh, what a Bomb! Oh, Heaven defend us!
The thought of Bombs is quite tremendous!
What crowds will come from every shore
To gaze on its amazing bore!
What swarms of Statesmen, warm and loyal,
To worship Bomb so truly royal!
And first approach three 'secret hags,'
Then him the R——t [Regent] calls 'Old Bags;' [the Lord Chancellor, John Scott, 1st Earl of Eldon]
Methinks I see V———t [Vansittart] come,
And humbly kiss the royal Bomb!
While T——y W———y [Tylney Wellesley], (loyal soul)
Will take its measure with a Pole;
And C———h [Castlereagh] will low beseech
To kiss a corner of the breech;
And next will come of G——y R—e, [George Rose]
And in the touch-hole shove his nose!

The poem was accompanied by a cartoon drawn by George Cruikshank, which showed the Prince Regent as the personification of the mortar with a queue of ministers lining up to kiss his backside. Similarly, S.W. Fores published C. Williams' A Representation of the Regent's Tremendous Thing erected in the Park – "thing" being a slang term for "penis" – with predictable double entendres such as a parson saying "What an erection to be sure," to which his wife replies, "I could look at it for ever". Many other cartoonists followed suit, often depicting the mortar in conjunction with the Prince Regent's then mistress Lady Hertford.

== See also ==
- 1816 in art
- Greek mythology in western art and literature
