= Stesichorus =

6th-century BC Greek lyric poet

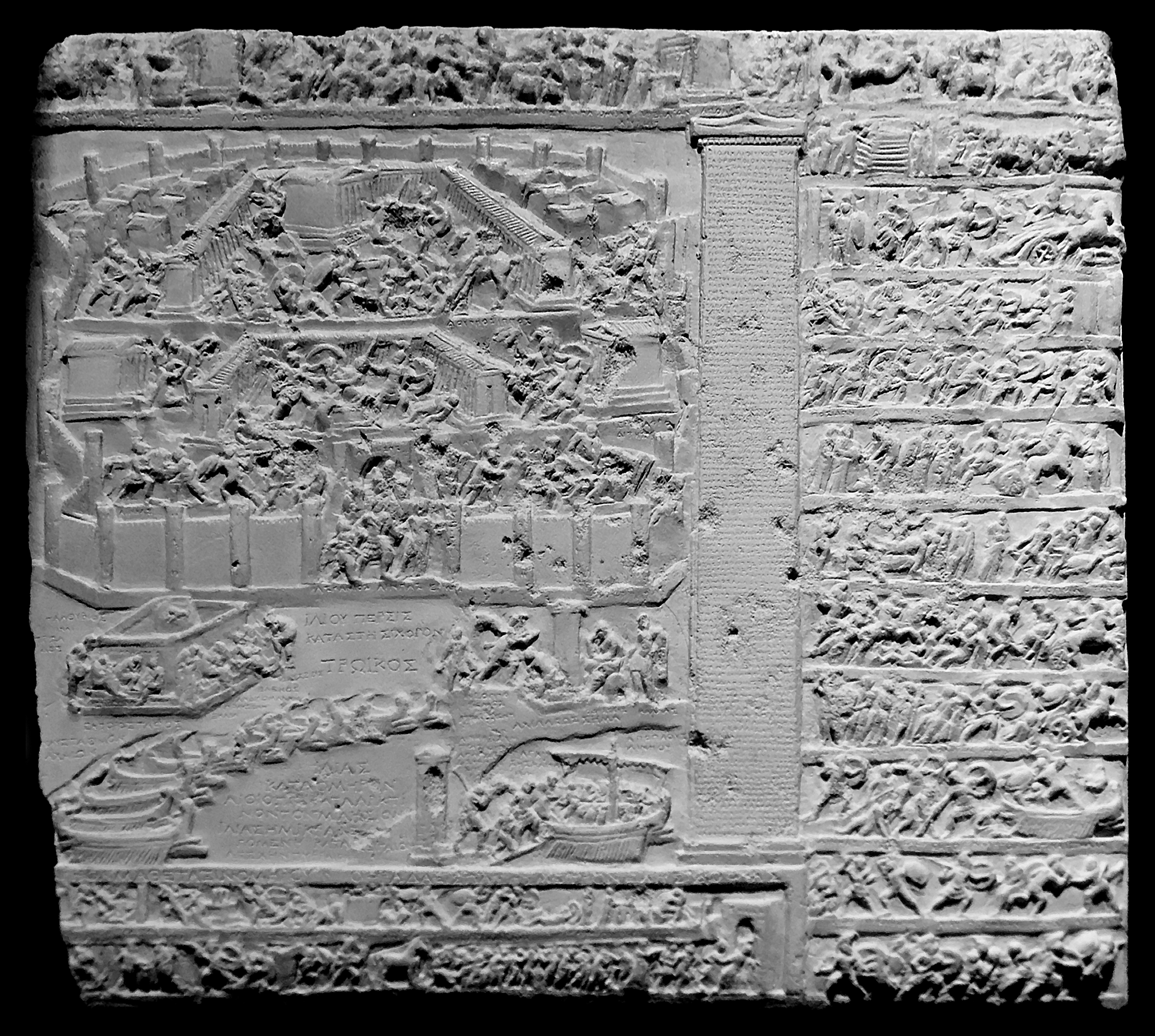
A scene from the Tabula Iliaca, bearing the inscription "Sack of Troy according to Stesichorus"

Stesichorus (/stɪˈsɪkərəs/; Greek: Στησίχορος, Stēsichoros; c. 630 – c. 555 BC) was a Greek lyric poet native of Metauros (Gioia Tauro today). He is best known for telling epic stories in lyric metres, and for some ancient traditions about his life, such as his opposition to the tyrant Phalaris, and the blindness he is said to have incurred and cured by composing verses first insulting and then flattering to Helen of Troy.

He was ranked among the nine lyric poets esteemed by the scholars of Hellenistic Alexandria, and yet his work attracted relatively little interest among ancient commentators, so that remarkably few fragments of his poetry now survive. As David Campbell notes: "Time has dealt more harshly with Stesichorus than with any other major lyric poet." Recent discoveries, recorded on Egyptian papyrus (notably and controversially, the Lille Stesichorus), have led to some improvements in our understanding of his work, confirming his role as a link between Homer's epic narrative and the lyric narrative of poets like Pindar.

Stesichorus also exercised an important influence on the representation of myth in 6th-century art, and on the development of Athenian dramatic poetry.

== Biography ==
Stesichorus was born in Metauros (modern Gioia Tauro) in Calabria, Southern Italy c. 630 BC and died in Katane (modern Catania) in Sicily in 555 BC. Some say that he came from Himera in Sicily, but that was due to him moving from Metauros to Himera later in life. When exiled from Pallantium in Arcadia he came to Katane (Catania) and when he died there was buried in front of the gate which is called Stesichorean after him. In date he was later than the lyric poet Alcman, since he was born in the 37th Olympiad (632/28 BC). He died in the 56th Olympiad (556/2 BC). He had a brother Mamertinus who was an expert in geometry and a second brother Helianax, a law-giver. He was a lyric poet. His poems are in the Doric dialect and in 26 books. They say that he was blinded for writing abuse of Helen and recovered his sight after writing an encomium of Helen, the Palinode, as the result of a dream. He was called Stesichorus because he was the first to establish (stesai) a chorus of singers to the cithara; his name was originally Tisias.

=== Chronology ===
The specific dates given by the Suda for Stesichorus have been dismissed by one modern scholar as "specious precision" — its dates for the floruit of Alcman (the 27th Olympiad), the life of Stesichorus (37th–56th Olympiads) and the birth of Simonides (the 56th Olympiad) virtually lay these three poets end-to-end, a coincidence that seems to underscore a convenient division between old and new styles of poetry. Nevertheless, the Suda's dates "fit reasonably well" with other indications of Stesichorus's life-span — for example, they are consistent with a claim elsewhere in Suda that the poet Sappho was his contemporary, along with Alcaeus and Pittacus, and also with the claim, attested by other sources, that Phalaris was his contemporary. Aristotle quoted a speech the poet is supposed to have made to the people of Himera warning them against the tyrannical ambitions of Phalaris. The Byzantine grammarian Tzetzes also listed him as a contemporary of the tyrant and yet made him a contemporary of the philosopher Pythagoras as well. According to Lucian, the poet lived to 85 years of age. Hieronymus declared that his poems became sweeter and more swan-like as he approached death, and Cicero knew of a bronzed statue representing him as a bent old man holding a book. Eusebius dated his floruit in Olympiad 42.2 (611/10 BC) and his death in Olympiad 55.1 (560/59 BC).

=== Family ===
The Suda's claim that Hesiod was the father of Stesichorus can be dismissed as "fantasy" yet it is also mentioned by Tzetzes and the Hesiodic scholiast Proclus (one of them however named the mother of Stesichorus via Hesiod as Ctimene and the other as Clymene). According to another tradition known to Cicero, Stesichorus was the grandson of Hesiod yet even this verges on anachronism since Hesiod was composing verses around 700 BC. Stesichorus might be regarded as Hesiod's literary "heir" (his treatment of Helen in the Palinode, for example, may have owed much to Hesiod's Catalogue of Women) and maybe this was the source of confusion about a family relationship. According to Stephanus of Byzantium and the philosopher Plato the poet's father was named Euphemus, but an inscription on a herm from Tivoli listed him as Euclides. The poet's mathematically inclined brother was named Mamertinus by the Suda but a scholiast in a commentary on Euclid named him Mamercus.

=== Background ===
Stesichorus's lyrical treatment of epic themes was well-suited to a western Greek audience, owing to the popularity of hero-cults in southern Italy and Magna Graeca, as for example the cult of Philoctetes at Sybaris, Diomedes at Thurii and the Atreidae at Tarentum. It was also a sympathetic environment for his most famous poem, The Palinode, composed in praise of Helen, an important cult figure in the Doric diaspora. On the other hand, the western Greeks were not very different from their eastern counterparts and his poetry cannot be regarded exclusively as a product of the Greek West . His poetry reveals both Doric and Ionian influences and this is consistent with the Suda's claim that his birthplace was either Metauria or Himera, both of which were founded by colonists of mixed Ionian/Doric descent. On the other hand, a Doric/Ionian flavour was fashionable among later poets — it is found in the 'choral' lyrics of the Ionian poets Simonides and Bacchylides — and it might have been fashionable even in Stesichorus's own day. His poetry included a description of the river Himera as well as praise for the town named after it, and his poem Geryoneis included a description of Pallantium in Arcadia. His possible exile from Arcadia is attributed by one modern scholar to rivalry between Tegea and Sparta. Traditional accounts indicate that he was politically active in Magna Graeca. Aristotle mentions two public speeches by Stesichorus: one to the people of Himera, warning them against Phalaris, and another to the people of Locri, warning them against presumption (possibly referring to their war against Rhegium). Philodemus believed that the poet once stood between two armies (which two, he doesn't say) and reconciled them with a song — but there is a similar story about Terpander. According to the 9th century scholar Photius, the term eight all (used by gamblers at dice) derives from an expensive burial the poet received outside Catana, including a monument with eight pillars, eight steps and eight corners, but the 3rd century grammarian Julius Pollux attributed the same term to an 'eight all ways' tomb given to the poet outside Himera.

=== Career ===
Many modern scholars don't accept the Suda's claim that Stesichorus was named for his innovations in choral poetry — there are good reasons to believe that his lyrical narratives were composed for solo performance (see Works below). Moreover the name wasn't unique — there seems to have been more than one poet of this name (see Spurious works below). The Suda in yet another entry refers to the fact, now verified by Papyrus fragments, that Stesichorus composed verses in units of three stanzas (strophe, antistrophe and epode), a format later followed by poets such as Bacchylides and Pindar. Suda claims this three-stanza format was popularly referred to as the three of Stesichorus in a proverbial saying rebuking cultural buffoons ("You don't even know the three of Stesichorus!"). According to one modern scholar, however, this saying could instead refer to the following three lines of his poem The Palinode, addressed to Helen of Troy:

There is no truth in that story,
You didn't ride in the well-rowed galleys,
You didn't reach the walls of Troy.

Helen of Troy's bad character was a common theme among poets such as Sappho and Alcaeus and, according to various ancient accounts, Stesichorus viewed her in the same light until she magically punished him with blindness for blaspheming her in one of his poems. According to a colourful account recorded by Pausanias, she later sent an explanation to Stesichorus via a man from Croton, who was on a pilgrimage to White Island in the Black Sea (near the mouth of the Blue Danube), and it was in response to this that Stesichorus composed the Palinode, absolving her of all blame for the Trojan War and thus restoring himself to full sight.

== Works ==
The ancients associated the lyrical qualities of Stesichorus with the voice of the nightingale, as in this quote from the Palatine Anthology: "...at his birth, when he had just reached the light of day, a nightingale, travelling through the air from somewhere or other, perched unnoticed on his lips and struck up her clear song." The account is repeated by Pliny the Elder but it was the epic qualities of his work that most impressed ancient commentators, though with some reservations on the part of Quintilian:

The greatness of Stesichorus' genius is shown among other things by his subject-matter: he sings of the most important wars and the most famous commanders and sustains on his lyre the weight of epic poetry. In both their actions and their speeches he gives due dignity to his characters, and if only he had shown restraint he could possibly have been regarded as a close rival of Homer; but he is redundant and diffuse, a fault to be sure but explained by the abundance of what he had to say. —Quintilian

In a similar vein, Dionysius of Halicarnassus commends Stesichorus for "...the magnificence of the settings of his subject matter; in them he has preserved the traits and reputations of his characters", and Longinus puts him in select company with Herodotus, Archilochus and Plato as the 'most Homeric' of authors.

Modern scholars tend to accept the general thrust of the ancient comments – even the 'fault' noted by Quintilian gets endorsement: 'longwindedness', as one modern scholar calls it, citing, as proof of it, the interval of 400 lines separating Geryon's death from his eloquent anticipation of it. Similarly, "the repetitiveness and slackness of the style" of the recently discovered Lille papyrus has even been interpreted by one modern scholar as proof of Stesichorean authorship – though others originally used it as an argument against. Possibly Stesichorus was even more Homeric than ancient commentators realized – they had assumed that he composed verses for performance by choirs (the triadic structure of the stanzas, comprising strophe, antistrophe and epode, is consistent with choreographed movement) but a poem such as the Geryoneis included some 1500 lines and it probably required about four hours to perform – longer than a chorus might reasonably be expected to dance. Moreover, the versatility of lyric meter is suited to solo performance with self-accompaniment on the lyre – which is how Homer himself delivered poetry. Whether or not it was a choral technique, the triadic structure of Stesichorean lyrics allowed for novel arrangements of dactylic meter – the dominant meter in his poems and also the defining meter of Homeric epic – thus allowing for Homeric phrasing to be adapted to new settings. However, Stesichorus did more than recast the form of epic poetry – works such as the Palinode were also a recasting of epic material: in that version of the Trojan War, the combatants fought over a phantom Helen while the real Helen either stayed home or went to Egypt (see a summary below). The 'Lyric Age' of Greece was in part self-discovery and self-expression – as in the works of Alcaeus and Sappho – but a concern for heroic values and epic themes still endured:

Stesichorus' citharodic narrative points to the simultaneous coexistence of different literary genres and currents in an age of great artistic energy and experimentation. It is one of the exciting qualities of early Greek culture that forms continue to evolve, but the old traditions still remain strong as points of stability and proud community, unifying but not suffocating. —Charles Segal.

=== Style ===
The following description of the birthplace of the monster Geryon, preserved as a quote by the geographer Strabo, is characteristic of the "descriptive fulness" of his style:

σχεδὸν ἀντιπέρας κλεινᾶς Ἐρυθείας
<
> Ταρτησ-
σοῦ ποταμοῦ παρὰ παγὰσ ἀπείρονας ἀρ-
γυρορίζους
ἐν κευθμῶνι πέτρας.

A nineteenth-century translation imaginatively fills in the gaps while communicating something of the richness of the language:

Where monster Geryon first beheld the light,
Famed Erytheia rises to the sight;
Born near th' unfathomed silver springs that gleam
'Mid caverned rocks, and feed Tartessus' stream.

See The Queen's Speech in the Lille fragment for more on Stesichorus's style.

=== An "Homeric" simile ===
The Homeric qualities of Stesichorus' poetry are demonstrated in a fragment of his poem Geryoneis describing the death of the monster Geryon. A scholiast writing in a margin on Hesiod's Theogony noted that Stesichorus gave the monster wings, six hands and six feet, whereas Hesiod himself had only described it as 'three-headed'. yet Stesichorus adapted Homeric motifs to create a humanized portrait of the monster, whose death in battle mirrors the death of Gorgythion in Homer's Iliad, translated here by Richmond Lattimore:

He bent drooping his head to one side, as a garden poppy
bends beneath the weight of its yield and the rains of springtime;" (Iliad 8.306-8)

Homer here transforms Gorgythion's death in battle into a thing of beauty—the poppy has not wilted or died. Stesichorus adapted the simile to restore Death's ugliness while still retaining the poignancy of the moment:

Then Geryon rested his neck to one side

As might a poppy when it mars

The tenderness of its body shedding

Suddenly all of its petals... (Geryoneis)

The mutual self-reflection of the two passages is part of the novel aesthetic experience that Stesichorus here puts into play. The enduring freshness of his art, in spite of its epic traditions, is borne out by Ammianus Marcellinus in an anecdote about Socrates: happening to overhear, on the eve of his own execution, the rendition of a song of Stesichorus, the old philosopher asked to be taught it: "So that I may know something more when I depart from life."

=== The 26 books ===
According to the Suda, the works of Stesichorus were collected in 26 books, but each of these was probably a long, narrative poem. The titles of more than half of them are recorded by ancient sources:

- Helen: This might have been the poem in which he portrayed Helen of Troy according to convention as a bad character. His interest in the Trojan epic cycle is evinced in a number of works.
- Helen: Palinodes: An introduction to a poem of Theocritus refers to "the first book of Stesichorus's Helen", indicating that there were at least two books under this title. Similarly, a commentary recorded on a papyrus, indicates there were two Palinodes, one censuring Homer, the other Hesiod for the false story that Helen went to Troy. Dio Chrysostom summarises two accounts of the Palinode, one in which Helen never sailed for Troy, and a second in which she ended up in Egypt – only her image arrived at Troy. It is not known if either of the two Palinodes was separate from the Helen book(s).
- Sack of Troy (Iliupersis): Some scholars think the content of the poem can be deduced from a relief carved onto a monument near Rome, but this is contentious – see the section below Tabula Iliaca.
- Wooden Horse: The title was recorded in a fragmentary form on a roll of papyrus: Στη...Ίππ.. ~ Ste(sichorus's Wooden) Hor(se). Possibly it was just an alternative title for Sack of Troy.
- Nostoi (The Returns): This dealt with the return of the Greek warriors from Troy.
- Geryoneis: This relates the theft by Heracles of Geryon's cattle. Many recently discovered fragments allow us a glimpse of the poet at work over the length of the entire poem. It includes:
  - romantic geography – descriptions of the Sun's voyage in a golden cup under Ocean, of Eurytion's homeland, the 'all-golden' Hesperides, and of Pallanteum in Arcadia, which possibly featured as the home of the Centaur, Pholus;
  - poignant speeches based on Homeric models – a proud speech by Geryon to Heracles that echoes Sarpedon's speech to Glaucus, and an exchange between Geryon and his mother Callirhoe that echoes exchanges between Achilles-Thetis and Hector-Hecuba;
  - heroic action, again with Homeric colouring – a description of the dying Geryon that echoes the death of Gorgythion.
- Cerberus: The title is mentioned by Julius Pollux only because it included the Greek word for a purse but clearly it relates to Heracles's descent into Hades to fetch Cerberus.
- Cycnus: A scholiast commenting on a poem by Pindar summarises the story: Heracles's final triumph over Cycnus after an initial defeat.
- Skylla: The title is mentioned by a scholiast on Apollonius of Rhodes in a passing reference to Skylla's parentage and possibly it involved Heracles.
- Thebaid, Seven Against Thebes?: These two titles are conjectured by one modern scholar as appropriate for the longest fragment attributed to Stesichorus – discovered in 1974 among the wrappings of a mummy of the 2nd century BC stored at the university of Lille, generally known as The Lille Stesichorus. It presents a speech by a Theban queen, possibly Jocasta, and some scholars have denied attribution to Stesichorus on account of its "drab, repetitious flaccidity". But opinions are mixed and one scholar sees in it "...Stesichorus' full mastery of his technique, handling epic situations and characters with the flexibility and poignancy of lyric."
- Eriphyle: The title is mentioned by Sextus Empiricus in relation to an imaginative account of Asclepius raising the dead at Thebes. Evidently it concerns Eriphyle's role in the Theban epic cycle but with an imaginative twist.
- Europa: The title is mentioned by a scholiast on the Phoenissae of Euripides in relation to Stesichorus's imaginative variation on the traditional tale of Cadmus, the brother of Europa, sowing dragon's teeth – Stesichorus presented Athena in that role.
- Oresteia: It came in two parts. The title is mentioned by a scholiast on Peace, a play by Aristophanes, attributing some of the lyrics to a borrowing from Stesichorus's poem. The 'second' Oresteia is mentioned in a scholiast's comment on Dionysius of Thrace, according to which Stesichorus attributed the discovery of the Greek alphabet to Palamedes.
- Boar-hunters: Athenaeus mentions the title when quoting a description of a boar nosing the earth and the poem evidently concerned Meleager and the Calydonian Boar.
- Funeral Games of Pelias: The title is recorded by Zenobius, Athenaeus and Etymologicum Magnum, the last two of which also include a handful of quotes.

=== Spurious works ===
Some poems were wrongly attributed to Stesichorus by ancient sources, including bucolic poems and some love songs such as Calyce and Rhadine. It is possible that these are the works of another Stesichorus belonging to the fourth century, mentioned in the Marmor Parium.

== Tabula Iliaca ==
Bovillae, about twelve miles outside Rome, was the original site of a monument dating from the Augustan period and now located in the Capitoline Museum. The stone monument features scenes from the fall of Troy, depicted in low relief, and an inscription: Ιλίου Πέρσις κατα Στησίχορον ('Sack of Troy according to Stesichorus'). Scholars are divided as to whether or not it accurately depicts incidents described by Stesichorus in his poem Sack of Troy. There is, for example, a scene showing Aeneas and his father Anchises departing 'for Hesperia' with 'sacred objects', which might have more to do with the poetry of Virgil than with that of Stesichorus.
