= Orthrus =

Mythical dog of Geryon

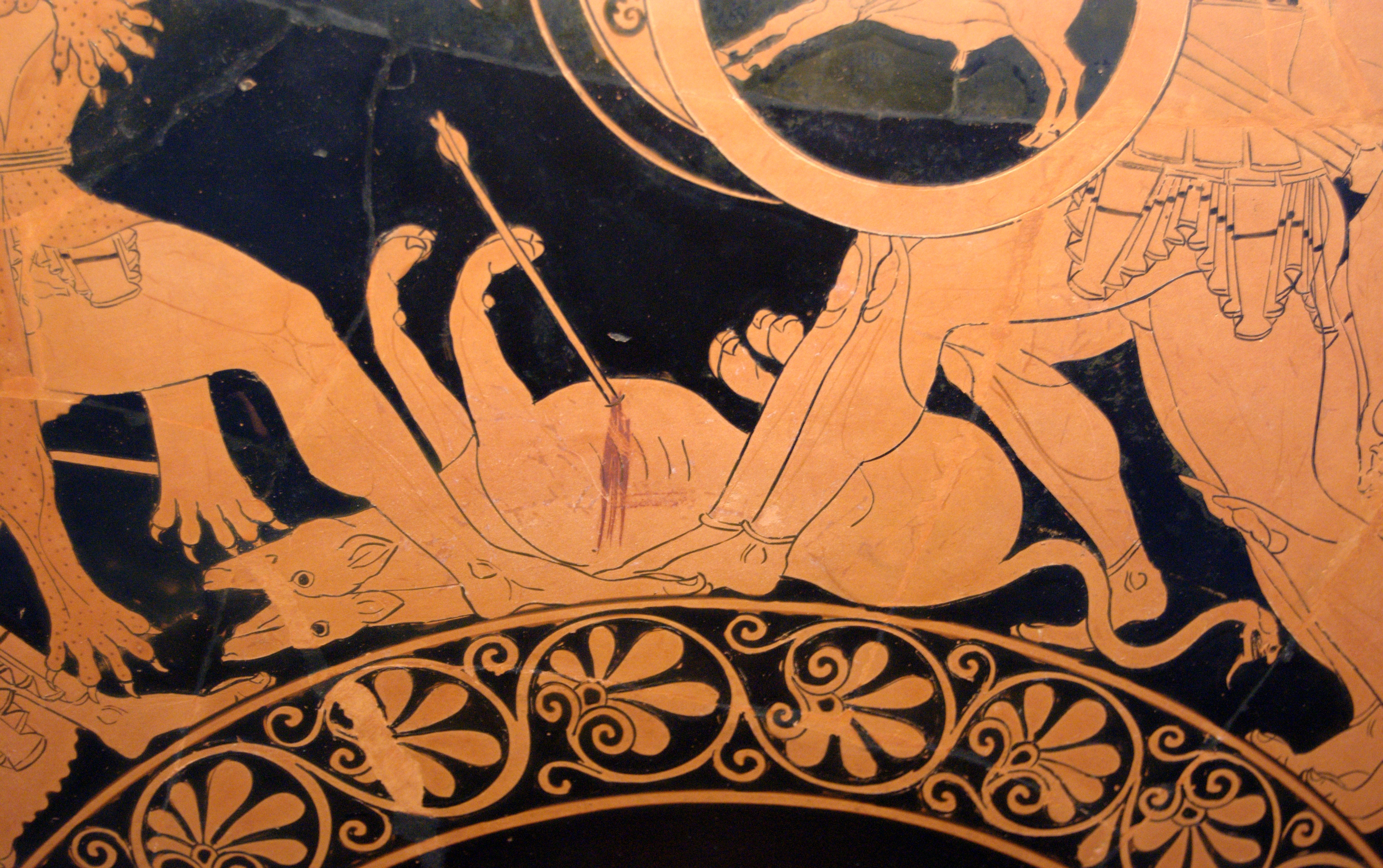
A two-headed Orthrus, with snake tail, lying wounded at the feet of Heracles (left) and the three-bodied Geryon (right). Detail from a red-figure kylix by Euphronios, 550–500 BC, Staatliche Antikensammlungen (Munich 2620).

In Greek mythology, Orthrus (Ancient Greek: Ὄρθρος, Orthros) or Orthus (Ancient Greek: Ὄρθος, Orthos) was, according to the mythographer Apollodorus, a two-headed dog who guarded Geryon's cattle and was killed by Heracles. He was the offspring of the monsters Echidna and Typhon, and the brother of Cerberus, who was also a multi-headed guard dog.

== Name ==
His name is given as either "Orthrus" (Ὄρθρος) or "Orthus" (Ὄρθος). For example, Hesiod, the oldest source, calls the hound "Orthus", while Apollodorus calls him "Orthrus".

== Mythology ==
According to Hesiod, Orthrus was the father of the Sphinx and the Nemean Lion, though whom Hesiod meant as the mother, whether it is Orthrus' own mother Echidna, the Chimera, or Ceto, is unclear.

Orthrus and his master Eurytion were charged with guarding the three-headed, or three-bodied giant Geryon's herd of red cattle in the "sunset" land of Erytheia ("red one"), an island in the far west of the Mediterranean. Heracles killed Orthrus, and later slew Eurytion and Geryon before taking the red cattle to complete his tenth labor. According to Apollodorus, Heracles killed Orthrus with his club, although in art Orthrus is sometimes depicted pierced by arrows.

The poet Pindar refers to the "hounds of Geryon" trembling before Heracles. Pindar's use of the plural "hounds" in connection with Geryon is unique. He may have used the plural because Orthus had multiple heads, or perhaps because he knew a tradition in which Geryon had more than one dog.

== In art ==
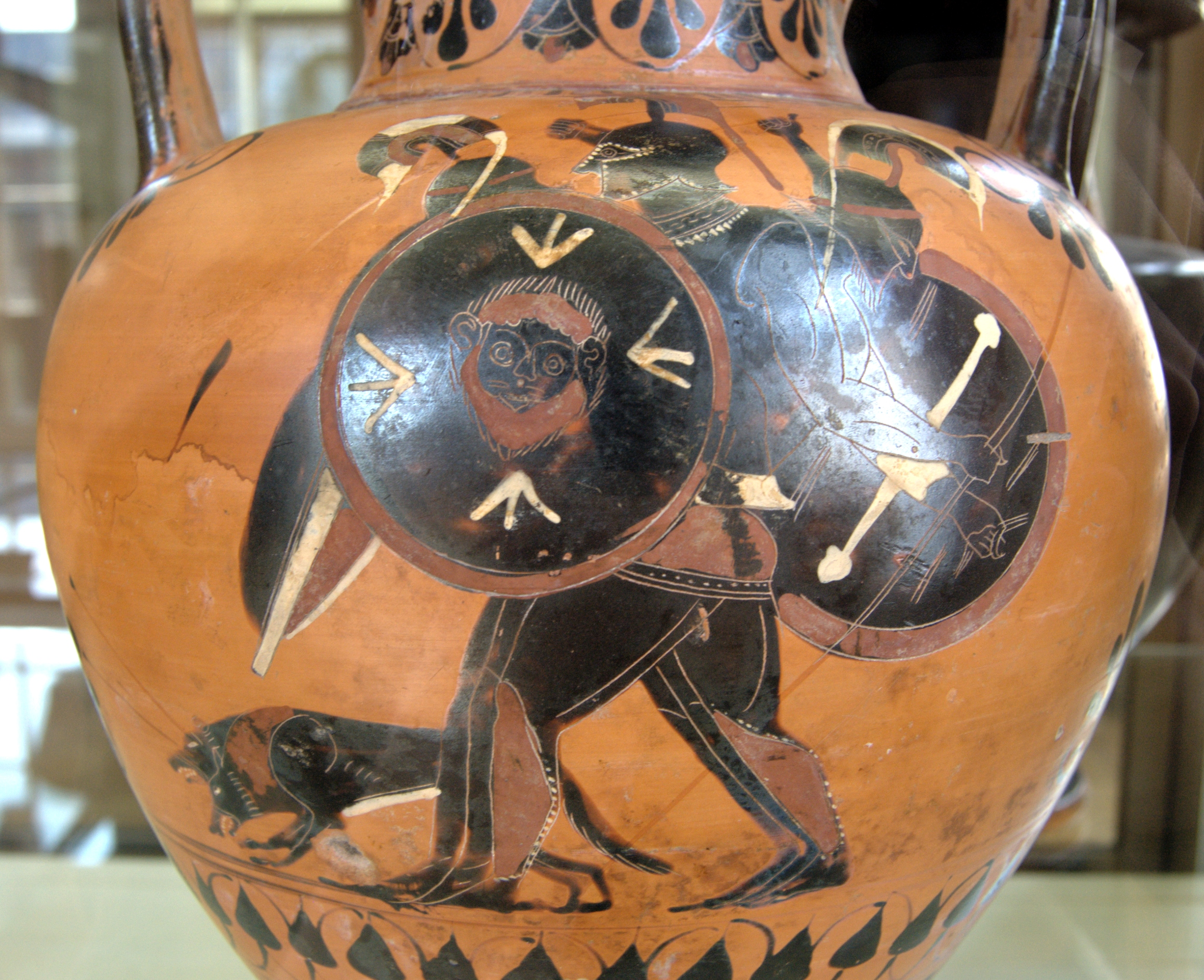
A two-headed Orthrus and a three-bodied Geryon. Attic black-figure neck amphora, by the Swing Painter, c. 550–500 BC (Paris, Cab. Med. 223).

Depictions of Orthrus in art are rare, and always in connection with the theft of Geryon's cattle by Heracles. He is usually shown dead or dying, sometimes pierced by one or more arrows.

The earliest depiction of Orthrus is found on a late seventh-century bronze horse pectoral from Samos (Samos B2518). It shows a two-headed Orthrus, with an arrow protruding from one of his heads, crouching at the feet, and in front of Geryon. Orthrus is facing Heracles, who stands to the left, wearing his characteristic lion-skin, fighting Geryon to the right.

A red-figure cup by Euphronios from Vulci c. 550–500 BC (Munich 2620) shows a two-headed Orthrus lying belly-up, with an arrow piercing his chest, and his snake tail still writhing behind him. Heracles is on the left, wearing his lion-skin, fighting a three-bodied Geryon to the right. An Attic black-figure neck amphora, by the Swing Painter c. 550–500 BC (Cab. Med. 223), shows a two-headed Orthrus, at the feet of a three-bodied Geryon, with two arrows protruding through one of his heads, and a dog tail.

According to Apollodorus, Orthrus had two heads; however, in art, the number varies. As in the Samos pectoral, Euphronios' cup, and the Swing Painter's, amphora, Orthrus is usually depicted with two heads, although, from the mid sixth century, he is sometimes depicted with only one head, while one early fifth century BC Cypriot stone relief gives him three heads, á la Cerberus.

The Euphronios cup, and the stone relief depict Orthrus, like Cerberus, with a snake tail, though usually he is shown with a dog tail, as in the Swing Painter's amphora.

== Similarities with Cerberus ==
Orthrus bears a close resemblance to Cerberus, the hound of Hades. Classical scholar Arthur Bernard Cook described Orthrus as the "doublet" of Cerberus. According to Hesiod, Cerberus, like Orthrus was the offspring of Echidna and Typhon. Like Orthrus, Cerberus was multi-headed. The earliest accounts gave Cerberus fifty, or even one hundred heads, though in literature three heads for Cerberus became the standard. However, in art, often only two heads for Cerberus are shown. Cerberus was also usually depicted with a snake tail, just as Orthrus was sometimes. Both became guard dogs, with Cerberus guarding the gates of Hades, and both were overcome by Heracles in one of his labours.

== See also ==
- List of Greek mythological creatures
