= Statuette of Geryon =

Etruscan sculpture

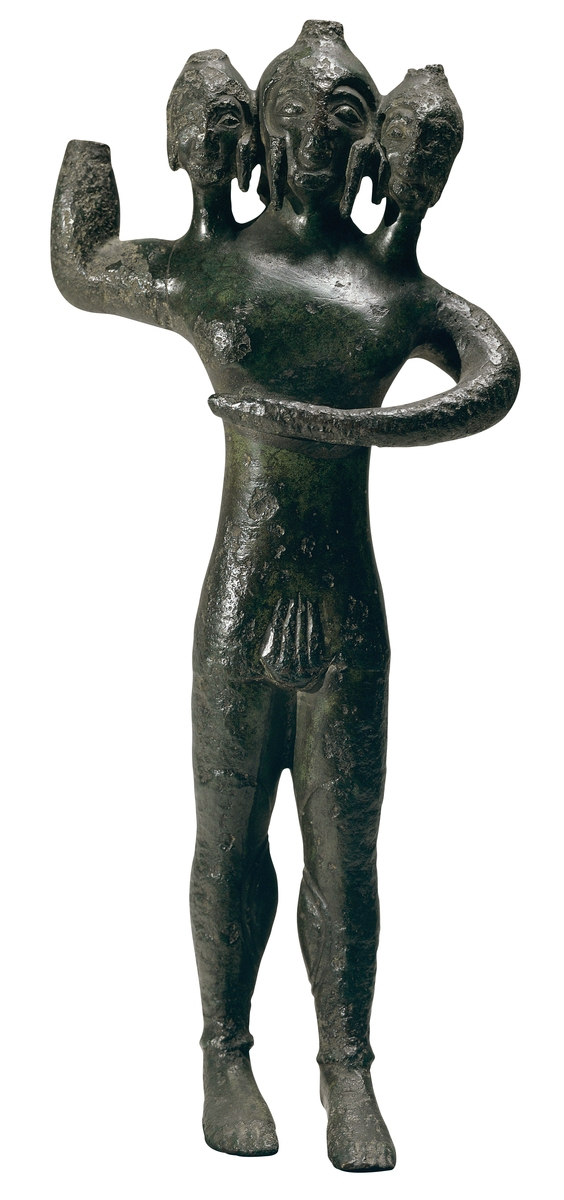
Statuette of Geryon (6th century BC)

The Statuette of Geryon is a 6th-century BC bronze Etruscan sculpture, showing the three-headed giant Geryon dressed as an ancient Greek hoplite. It was probably discovered in Chiusi in Italy, one of the towns of the Etruscan dodecapolis. It was one of the objects and artworks left to the musée des beaux-arts de Lyon by Jacques-Amédée Lambert in 1850.

== Sources ==
- Stéphanie Boucher « la collection étrusque du musée des beaux-arts de Lyon », Bulletin des musées et monuments lyonnais, 1964–3, vol. III, p. 68/206
