= Geryon =

Giant in Greek mythology

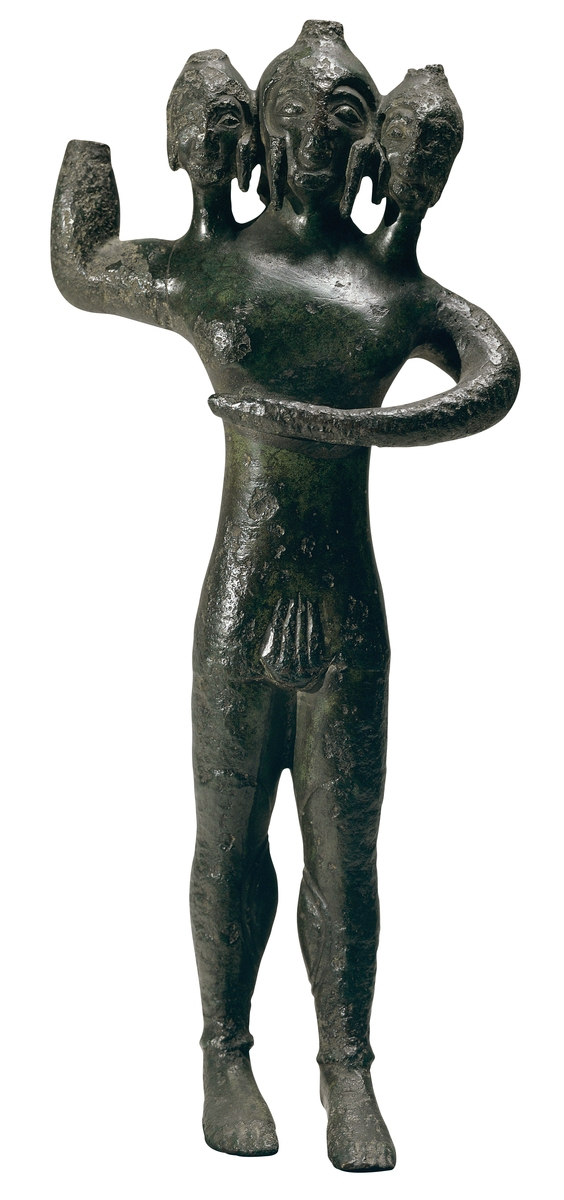
A statuette of Geryon at the Museum of Fine Arts of Lyon

In Greek mythology, Geryon (/ˈdʒɪəriən/; Ancient Greek: Γηρυών, romanized: Gēryṓn, Γηρυόνης, Gēryónēs, or Γηρυονεύς, Gēryoneús, lit. 'the shouter', 'the roarer' or 'one who cries out') was a fearsome giant who dwelt on the island Erytheia of the mythic Hesperides in the far west of the Mediterranean. A more literal-minded later generation of Greeks associated the region with Tartessos in southern Iberia. (Note: The early third-century Life of Apollonius of Tyana notes an ancient tumulus at Gades raised over Geryon as for a Hellenic hero: "They say that they saw trees here such as are not found elsewhere upon the earth; and that these were called the trees of Geryon. There were two of them, and they grew upon the mound raised over Geryon: they were a cross between the spruce and the pine, and formed a third species; and blood dripped from their bark, just as gold does from the Heliad poplar" (v.5).)

Geryon was often described as a monster with either three bodies and three heads, three heads and one body, or three bodies and one head. He is commonly accepted as being mostly humanoid, with some distinguishing features (such as wings, or multiple bodies etc.) and in mythology, famed for his cattle. He was the son of Chrysaor and Callirrhoe, the grandson of Medusa and the nephew of Pegasus.

== Appearance ==
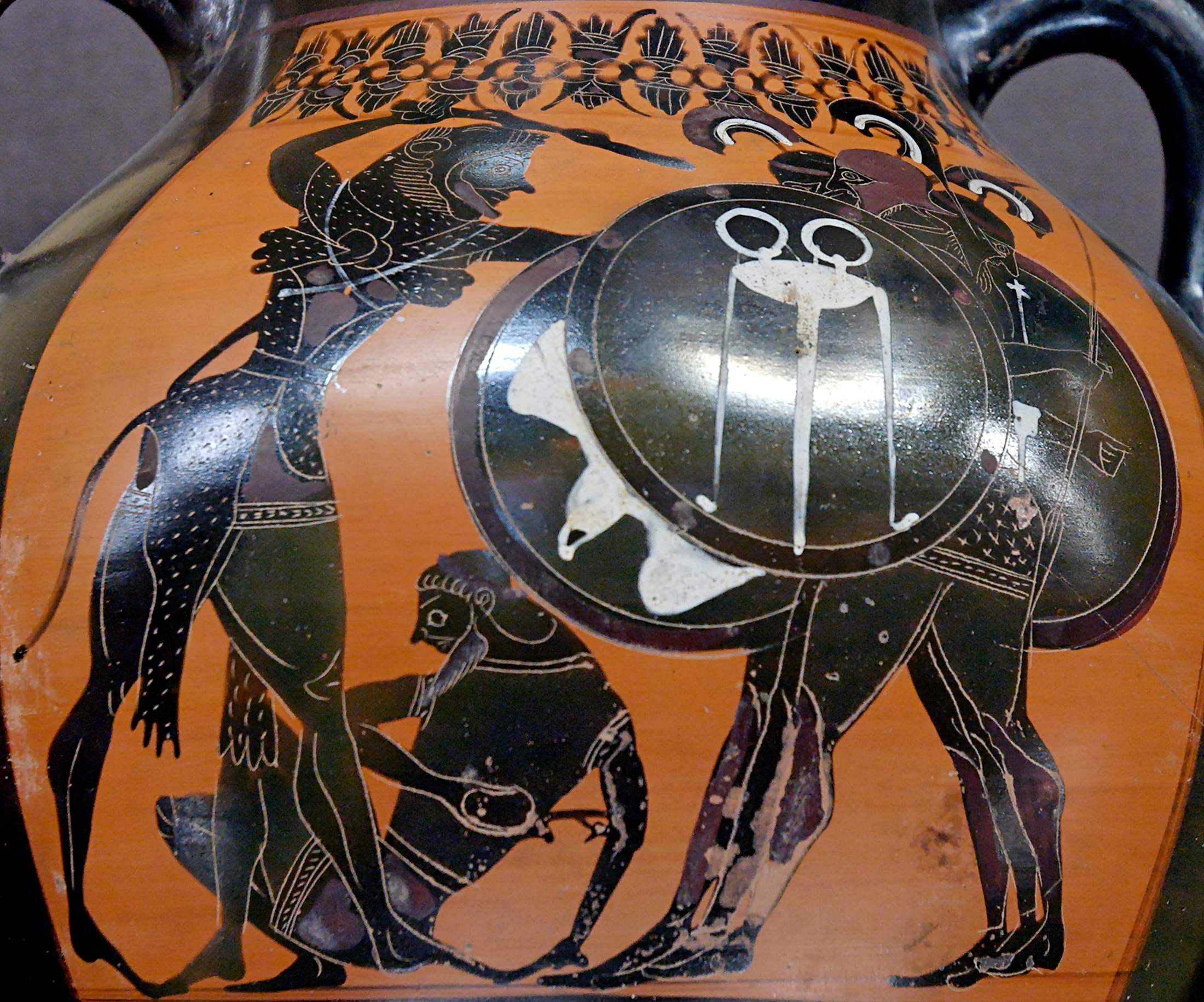
Heracles fighting Geryon, amphora by the E Group, c. 540 BC, Louvre

According to Hesiod (Note: Hesiod, Theogony "the triple-headed Geryon".) Geryon had one body and three heads, whereas the tradition followed by Aeschylus gave him three bodies. (Note: Aeschylus, Agamemnon: "Or if he had died as often as reports claimed, then truly he might have had three bodies, a second Geryon, and have boasted of having taken on him a triple cloak of earth, one death for each different shape.") A lost description by Stesichoros said that he has six hands and six feet and is winged; there are some mid-6th century BC Chalcidian vases portraying Geryon as winged. Some accounts state that he had six legs as well while others state that the three bodies were joined to one pair of legs. Apart from these bizarre features, his appearance was that of a warrior. He owned a two-headed hound named Orthrus, which was the brother of Cerberus, and a herd of magnificent red cattle that were guarded by Orthrus, and a herder named Eurytion (son of Erytheia). (Note: Erytheia, "sunset goddess" and nymph of the island that has her name, is one of the Hesperides.)

== Mythology ==
=== The Tenth Labour of Heracles ===
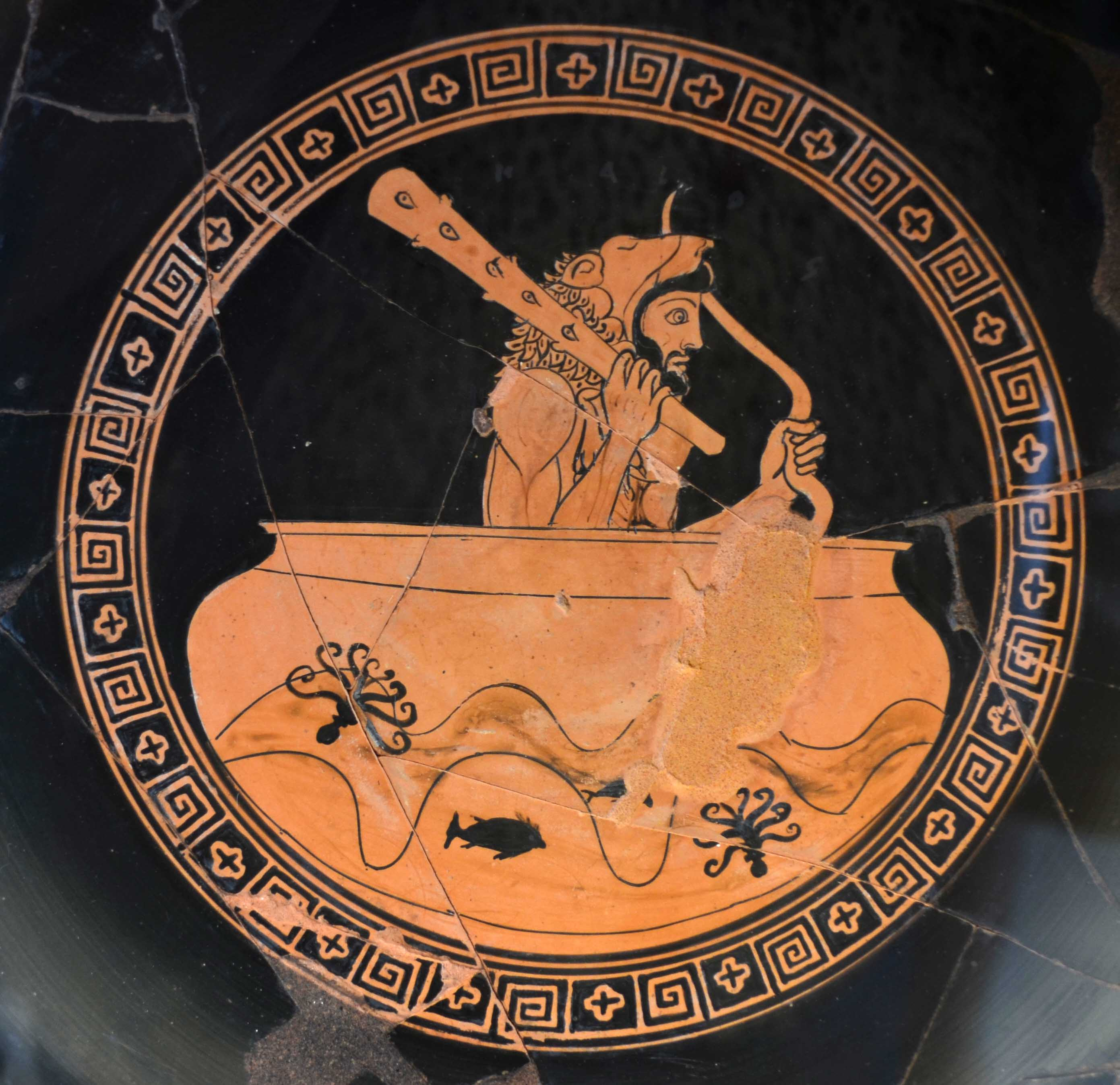
Heracles on the sea in the bowl of Helios. Roma, Museo Gregoriano Etrusco, n. 205336.

In the fullest account in the Bibliotheke of Pseudo-Apollodorus, Heracles was required to travel to Erytheia, in order to obtain the Cattle of Geryon (Γηρυόνου βόες) as his tenth labour. On the way there, he crossed the Libyan desert (Note: Libya was the generic name for North Africa to the Greeks.) and became so frustrated at the heat that he shot an arrow at Helios, the Sun. Helios "in admiration of his courage" gave Heracles the golden cup he used to sail across the sea from the west to the east each night. Heracles used it to reach Erytheia, a favorite motif of the vase-painters. Such a magical conveyance undercuts any literal geography for Erytheia, the "red island" of the sunset.

When Heracles reached Erytheia, no sooner had he landed than he was confronted by the two-headed dog, Orthrus. With one huge blow from his olive-wood club, Heracles killed the watchdog. Eurytion, the herdsman, came to assist Orthrus, but Heracles dealt with him the same way.

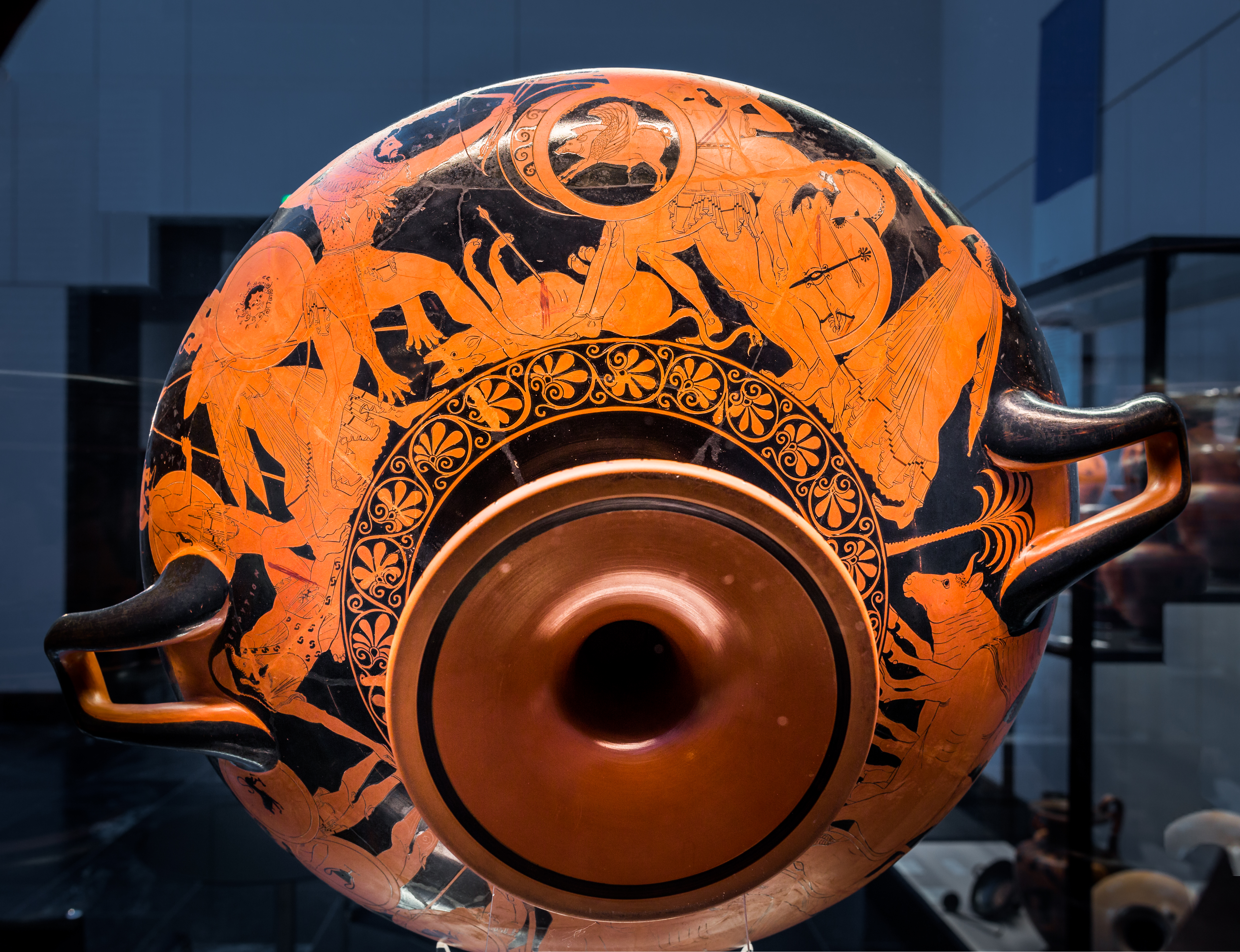
Herakles fighting the three-bodied Geryon; the shepherd Eurytion and the dog Orthros are already dead. Kylix in the Staatliche Antikensammlungen, Munich

On hearing the commotion, Geryon sprang into action, carrying three shields, three spears, and wearing three helmets. He pursued Heracles at the River Anthemus but fell victim to an arrow that had been dipped in the venomous blood of the Lernaean Hydra, shot so forcefully by Heracles that it pierced Geryon's forehead, "and Geryon bent his neck over to one side, like a poppy that spoils its delicate shapes, shedding its petals all at once". (Note: Stesichorus, fragment, translated by Denys Page.)

Heracles then had to herd the cattle back to Eurystheus. In Roman versions of the narrative, on the Aventine Hill in Italy, Cacus stole some of the cattle as Heracles slept, making the cattle walk backwards so that they left no trail, a repetition of the trick of the young Hermes. According to some versions, Heracles drove his remaining cattle past a cave, where Cacus had hidden the stolen animals, and they began calling out to each other. In others, Caca, Cacus' sister, told Heracles where he was. Heracles then killed Cacus, and according to the Romans, founded an altar where the Forum Boarium, the cattle market, was later held.

To annoy Heracles, Hera sent a gadfly to bite the cattle, irritate them and scatter them. The hero was within a year able to retrieve them. Hera then sent a flood which raised the level of a river so much, Heracles could not cross with the cattle. He piled stones into the river to make the water shallower. When he finally reached the court of Eurystheus, the cattle were sacrificed to Hera.

In the Aeneid, Vergil may have based the triple-souled figure of Erulus, king of Praeneste, on Geryon and Hercules' conquest of Geryon is mentioned in Book VIII. The Herculean Sarcophagus of Genzano features a three-headed representation of Geryon.

=== Stesichorus' account ===
The poet Stesichorus wrote a poem "Geryoneis" (Γηρυονηΐς) in the sixth century BC, which was apparently the source of this section in Bibliotheke; it contains the first reference to Tartessus. From the fragmentary papyri found at Oxyrhyncus it is possible (although there is no evidence) that Stesichorus inserted a character, Menoites, who reported the theft of the cattle to Geryon. Geryon then had an interview with his mother Callirrhoe, who begged him not to confront Heracles. They appear to have expressed some doubt as to whether Geryon would prove to be immortal. The gods met in council, where Athena warned Poseidon that she would protect Heracles against Poseidon's grandson Geryon. Denys Page observes that the increase in representation of the Geryon episode in vase-paintings began in the mid-sixth century and suggests that Stesichorus' "Geryoneis" provided the impetus.

The fragments are sufficient to show that the poem was composed in twenty-six line triads, of strophe, antistrophe and epode, repeated in columns along the original scroll, facts that aided Page in placing many of the fragments, sometimes of no more than a word, in what he believed to be their proper positions.

=== Pausanias' account ===
In his work Description of Greece, Pausanias mentions that Geryon had a daughter, Erytheia, who had a son with Hermes, Norax, the founder of the city of Nora in Sardinia. (Note: Pausanias, 10.17.5)

== In Dante's Inferno ==
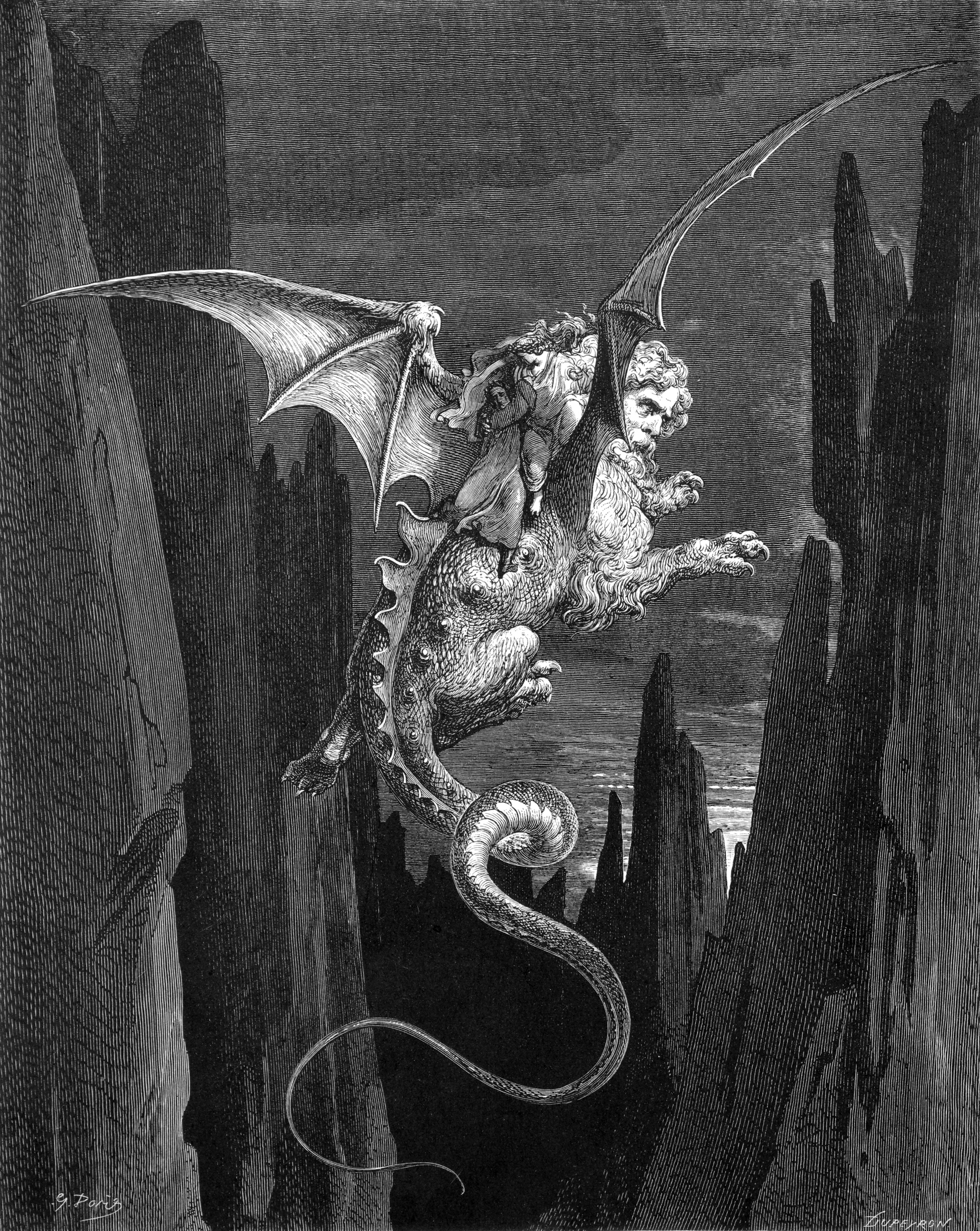
A wood engraving by Gustave Doré of Geryon for Dante's Inferno

The Geryon of Dante's 14th century epic poem Inferno bears no resemblance to any previous writings. Here, Geryon has become the Monster of Fraud, a beast with the paws of a bear or lion, the body of a wyvern, and a scorpion's poisonous sting at the tip of his tail, but with the face of an "honest man" (similar to a manticore). He dwells somewhere in the shadowed depths below the cliff between the seventh and eighth circles of Hell (the circles of violence and simple fraud, respectively); Geryon rises from the pit at Virgil's call and to Dante's horror Virgil requests a ride on the creature's back. They then board him, and Geryon slowly glides in descending circles around the waterfall of the river Phlegethon down to the great depths to the Circle of Fraud.

== In medieval Iberian culture ==
Coat of arms of Coruña. Since 1448, it features Geryon's skull at the base of the tower.

The myth of Geryon is linked to the building of the nations of Spain and Portugal, since he was considered an inhabitant of the Iberian Peninsula.

Medieval authors such as the bishop of Girona Joan Margarit i Pau (1422–1484) or the bishop of Toledo Rodrigo Jiménez de Rada tried to legitimate the resistance of Geryon against the Greek invader.

The Estoria de España of Alfonso X of Castile tells how Hercules killed the giant Geryon, cut his head off and ordered a tower built on it marking his victory. The Tower of Hercules in Coruña, Spain, is actually a working lighthouse rebuilt on a Roman lighthouse.

The Portuguese friar Bernardo de Brito considers the monster a historical invader, ruling despotically over the descendants of Tubal.

== See also ==
- The Cádiz Memorial is a London monument displaying a captured Napoleonic mortar mounted on a dragon inspired by Geryon.
- "Hercules and the Jilt Trip"
- Autobiography of Red, by Anne Carson, a modern re-creation of the myth
