= Erytheia =

Ancient island in the Bay of Cadiz

Erytheia (in Greek Ἐρύθεια, whose name derives from the colour red) was an ancient island located in the region that was identified as the Gaditan archipelago (present-day Bay of Cadiz).

The term was used by the geographer Ephorus of Cyme and by Philistides, and referred to the fact that its first inhabitants, of Tyrian origin, said they came from the Erythrian sea.

Gaditan archipelago

== Mythology ==
The island, first mentioned in Hesiod 's Theogony, is connected with the tenth labor of Heracles; in it he defeated Geryon and stole his cattle, protected by the two-headed dog Orthrus and Eurytion.

In another source (consisting of fragments of Stesichorus' poem Geryoneid) which deals with the same story, the island is located to the opposite side of the sources of the silver-rich Tartessos, which is most likely the Spanish Guadalquivir.

According to Apollodorus, it was Erytheia where the Giant Alcyoneus stole the sacred herd of Helios.

== History ==
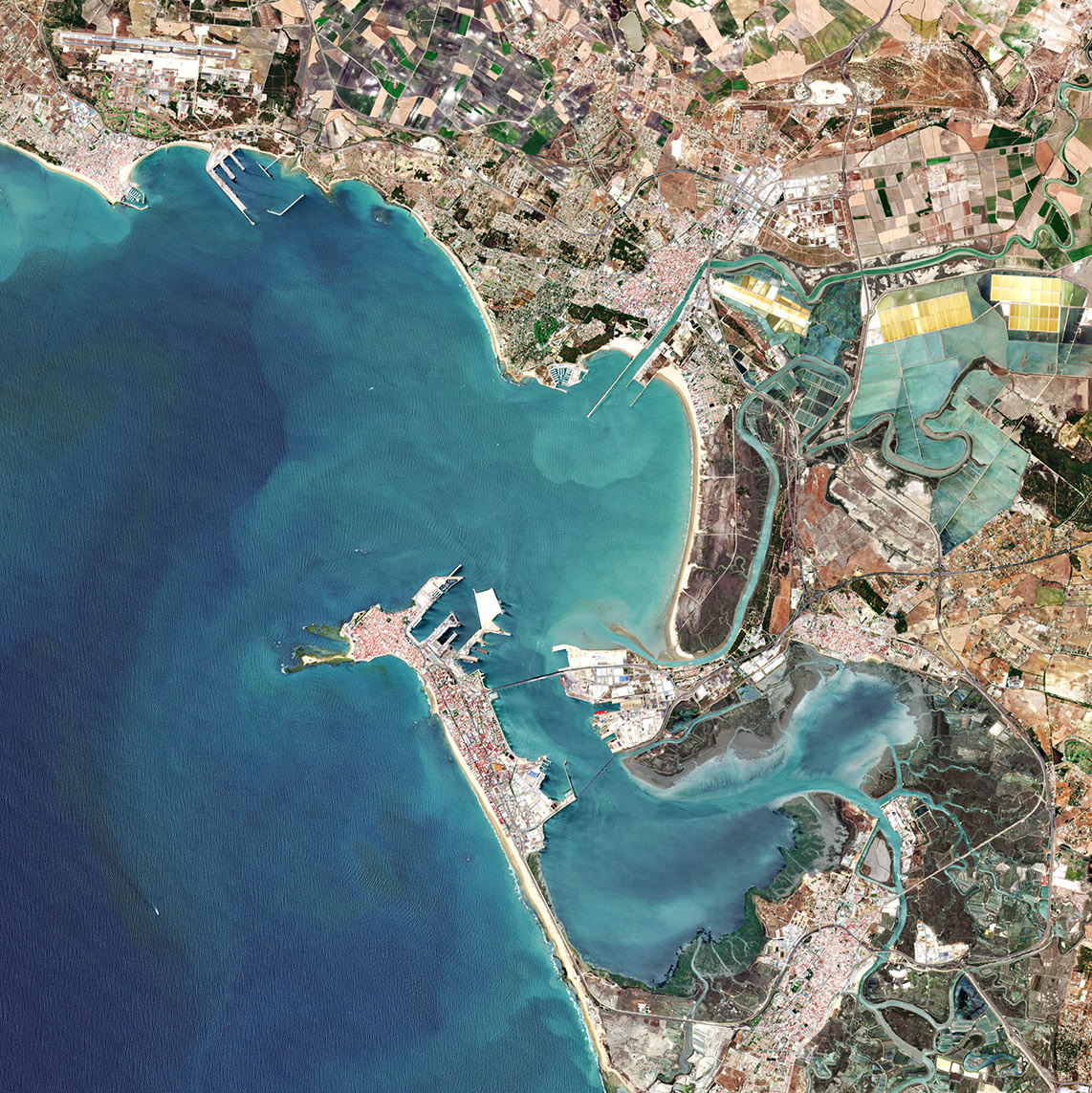
the bay of Cádiz today

Since ancient times there has been discussion about which of the islands in the Bay of Cadiz could correspond to the name of Erytheia. The existence of several islands, mentioned in ancient sources, has been confirmed by modern topographical and geological research. According to the testimony of Strabo, the first to identify the island with the Bay of Cadiz was a 5th century BC author, Pherecydes of Athens.

Pliny the Elder stated that: "On the side facing Spain, about 100 feet away, there is another long island, three miles wide, on which stood the original city of Gades."

Strabo also mentions that Gadeira was the name used by the natives to indicate the place where the Phoenicians settled (1104 BC) who founded the city of Cadiz (from the Phoenician word - "fortified") and was also the site of one of the Punic colonies.

The Guadalquivir served as a natural harbor for the Phoenicians, and here archaeologists have identified Phoenician-Punic port structures (along with ceramics, amphorae, and historic wood) dating back to the 4th and 3rd centuries BC, now buried under meters of earth and modern structures.

Huge quantities of sea snail shells were found in the remains attributed to the island, testifying to the island's thriving industrial activity for the production of the highly prized Tyrian purple dye and to the commercial importance of the Phoenician outpost in the Mediterranean. It was among the most known on the trade route, particularly for the transport of bronze. It was also a major source of tin and silver, used by the kingdom of Tartessos. The island was the last stop of the movement of the kingdom of Geryon, of which there are traces near Ambracia in Epirus, in the country of the Chaonians and according to the testimony of Hecataeus of Miletus, various traces in Italy.

In the Middle Ages, the island was called "San Pedro Island".

The island disappeared due to the exploitation of its caves and marine erosion, merging first with the nearby island of Kotinusa and later with the mainland.

The city extended from the Castle of Santa Catalina to the tip of the Nao, where the temple of Astarte or the Marine Venus was located.

== Necropolis ==
The Gadir necropolises are a group of Phoenician-Punic burial sites mainly located on the island, but they can also be found in various parts of the archipelago. Although often associated with burials from the 7th–6th centuries BC, the necropolises span many other periods.

=== First Necropolis ===
The origin of the necropolis is inevitably linked to that of the Phoenician outpost, which appears to date back to the late 9th century BC, contrary to the traditional dating of written sources that places it around 1100 BC in the northern part of Erytheia.

In Phoenician culture, it was customary to separate necropolises from cities using a watercourse. However, today there is no such barrier between the two sites. This change occurred because the former Zanja River has since disappeared; it once originated in the middle of the island and flowed into La Caleta beach, thus separating the original urban centre from the necropolis to the north.

=== Classical Necropolis ===
This necropolis spans mainly the period between the 7th and 6th centuries BC, a time when burials typically took place in pits or cremation urns; in the latter, plates, vases and cups were found in place of the classic archaic grave goods such as oinochoae. This demonstrates that, even at this stage, a change was taking place not only in funerary beliefs but also in the social structure of the community.

This necropolis also highlights the importance of the archipelago, as the discovery of Carthaginian jewellery and Egyptian alabaster vases demonstrates that it was a centre for trade throughout the Mediterranean.

=== Archaeological findings ===
the two sarcophagi found in the classical necropolis

Although the first necropolis was located in the northern part of Erytheia, a burial site dating to the 8th century BC was found in the southern area, near the Cathedral of Cádiz. While little is known about this site, the findings show that it belonged to an important figure, buried with a signet ring, placed within a structure built to be visible from a distance.

Instead in the classical necropolis, two anthropoid sarcophagi were discovered in 1887 and 1980. They probably belonged to two members of the city's aristocracy . It is possible that more of these sarcophagi will be found buried in the area.

== Etymology ==
The toponym Ἐρύθεια, derives directly from the Greek adjective ἐρυθρός (erythrós), which means "red" (from which today words such as erythrocytes or Eritrea derive).

In ancient times, the association with this color was explained with various motivations.

Located at the westernmost point known at the time, the island was identified as the place where the sun sets, being ideally colored by the red.

The name could recall the colour of the coat of the famous Geryon oxen.

Modern scholars point out that the term "red" could have been an indirect reference to the Phoenicians, linked to the production of purple on the island.

The historian Pliny the Elder also attests that the indigenous population (Celto-Iberian from Andalusia) originally referred to the island with the name of Asis, while in some texts by Timaeus, it appears with the name of Aphrodisias (island of Aphrodite). This is a probable Greek translation of an earlier Phoenician temple dedicated to the goddess Astarte. It was instead called Érythia by Ephorus.

== Bibliography ==
- Alarcón Castellanos, F. J. (2010). "Enterramientos fenicio-púnicos hallados en 1997 en un solar de la C/Tolosa Latour". In Niveau de Villedary, A. M.; Gómez Fernández, V. (eds.). Las necrópolis de Cádiz. Apuntes de arqueología gaditana en Homenaje a J.F. Sibón (in Spanish). Cádiz: Servicio de Publicaciones de la Diputación de Cádiz - Servicio de Publicaciones de la Universidad de Cádiz.
- Córdoba Alonso, I.; Ruiz Mata, D. (2005). "El asentamiento fenicio arcaico de la calle Cánovas del Castillo (Cádiz). Un análisis preliminar". In Celestino Pérez, S.; Jiménez Ávila, J. (eds.). El Periodo Orientalizante. Actas del III Simposio Internacional de Arqueología de Mérida: Protohistoria del Mediterráneo Occidental (Mérida, 2003). Anejos de Archivo Español de Arqueología, XXXV, 2 (in Spanish). Mérida: Consejo Superior de Investigaciones Científicas.
- Domínguez-Bella, S.; March, R. J.; Gener Basallote, J. M.; Martínez, J. (2011). "Análisis de restos orgánicos de la tumba púnica de la Casa del Obispo". In Domínguez Pérez, J. C. (ed.). Reconstruyendo la memoria fenicia en el Occidente del Mediterráneo. Gadir y el Círculo del Estrecho revisados. Propuestas de la arqueología desde un enfoque social (in Spanish). Cádiz: Servicio de Publicaciones, Universidad de Cádiz.
- Ferrer Albelda, E. (2010). "La necrópolis fenicio-púnica de Gadir. Reflexiones a partir de un discurso identitario no esencialista". In Niveau de Villedary, A. M.; Gómez Fernández, V. (eds.). Las necrópolis de Cádiz. Apuntes de arqueología gaditana en Homenaje a J.F. Sibón (in Spanish). Cádiz: Servicio de Publicaciones de la Diputación de Cádiz - Servicio de Publicaciones de la Universidad de Cádiz.
- Gener, J. M.; Jurado, G.; Pajuelo, J. M. (2014). "El monumento funerario de la Casa del Obispo (Cádiz)". In Niveau de Villedary, A. M. (ed.). Nuevas tendencias de investigación en Arqueología funeraria. Collezione di Studi Fenici (in Spanish). Rome: Fabrizio Serra ed.
- Muñoz Vicente, Á. (1998). "Notas sobre la necrópolis fenicia de Cádiz". Homenaje al Profesor Carlos Posac Mon (in Spanish). Ceuta: Instituto de Estudios Ceutíes.
- Niveau de Villedary, A. M. (2014). "De colonia a ciudad. Algunos apuntes sobre la situación y naturaleza de la ciudad de Gadir". In Ferrando Ballester, C.; Costa Ribas, B. (eds.). In amicitia. Miscel·lània d’estudis en homenatge a Jordi H. Fernández. Treballs del Museu Arqueològic d’Eivissa i Formentera, 72 (in Spanish). Ibiza: Museu Arqueològic d’Eivissa i Formentera.
- Perdigones, L.; Muñoz, A.; Pisano, G. (1990). La necrópolis fenicio-púnica de Cádiz. Siglos VI al IV a.C. Studia Punica, 7 (in Spanish). Rome.
- Sáez Romero, A. M.; Belizón Aragón, R. (2014). "Excavaciones en la Calle Hércules, 12 de Cádiz. Avance de resultados y primeras propuestas acerca de la posible necrópolis fenicia insular de Gadir". In Botto, M. (ed.). Los Fenicios en la Bahía de Cádiz: Nuevas investigaciones. Collezione di Studi Fenici, 46 (in Spanish). Rome: Fabrizio Serra ed.
- Torres Ortiz, M. (2010). "Sobre la cronología de la necrópolis fenica arcaica de Cádiz". In Niveau de Villedary, A. M.; Gómez Fernández, V. (eds.). Las necrópolis de Cádiz. Apuntes de arqueología gaditana en Homenaje a J.F. Sibón (in Spanish). Cádiz: Servicio de Publicaciones de la Diputación de Cádiz - Servicio de Publicaciones de la Universidad de Cádiz.
