= Herculean Sarcophagus of Genzano =

Roman sarcophagus

The Herculean Sarcophagus of Genzano is a Roman sarcophagus from Genzano, which is in store at the British Museum. It features the Twelve Labours of Hercules. It has been dated to about AD 150–180. It is 221 cm long, 76 cm high and 91.5 cm wide.

On the front of the sarcophagus Hercules is depicted performing five of his twelve tasks, from left to right:

- leading Cerberus from the gates of underworld
- taking Hippolyta's girdle
- plucking the golden apples of the garden of the Hesperides
- taming the ferocious mares of Diomedes
- overcoming the Nemean lion

The side panels provide two additional scenes of Hercules:

- struggling with the Ceryneian Hind
- fighting the Lernaean Hydra

The remaining five labours are shown on the front of the lid, from left to right:

- capturing the Erymanthian boar
- cleansing the Augean stables
- shooting the Stymphalian birds
- capturing the Cretan bull
- defeating the giant Geryon

These later scenes are framed by images of Hercules as a child strangling the serpents sent by Hera to kill him (left) and Hercules as an old man receiving immortality (right).

The image of Geryon depicts him with three heads.

The Proconesian marble for the sarcophagus was quarried on Marmara Island, Turkey, known as Proconnesus or Prokonnesos to the ancients. It is unknown whether it was exported as finished item or completed in a workshop in Rome.

The sarcophagus was one of the many items purchased by the British Museum, in the 19th century, from the Italian dealer and collector (among other talents) Alessandro Castellani. It is believed that the artifact originated from somewhere in the area of Genzano, Italy.
