= Giordano Orsini (senator) =

14th-century Roman nobleman

Giordano Orsini was a Roman nobleman of the 14th century. Exponent of the powerful Orsini family, he was the son of Matteo Rosso II Orsini, and because of that, nephew of Pope Nicholas III and of cardinal Giordano Orsini. Senatore of Rome in 1341 together with Orso dell'Anguillara, on 8 April of that year they bestowed the laurel crown to Francesco Petrarca on the Capitoline Hill. During the revolutionary attempt of Cola di Rienzo, he favoured the tribune, unlike the rest of the Roman nobility. Chief of the Montegiordano line of the family, he possibly gave the name to this Roman hill.

== Sources ==
- Pietrangeli, Carlo (1981). Guide rionali di Roma (in Italian). Vol. Ponte (II). Roma: Fratelli Palombi Editori. ISSN 0393-2710.
