= Swing Painter =

Ancient Greek vase painter

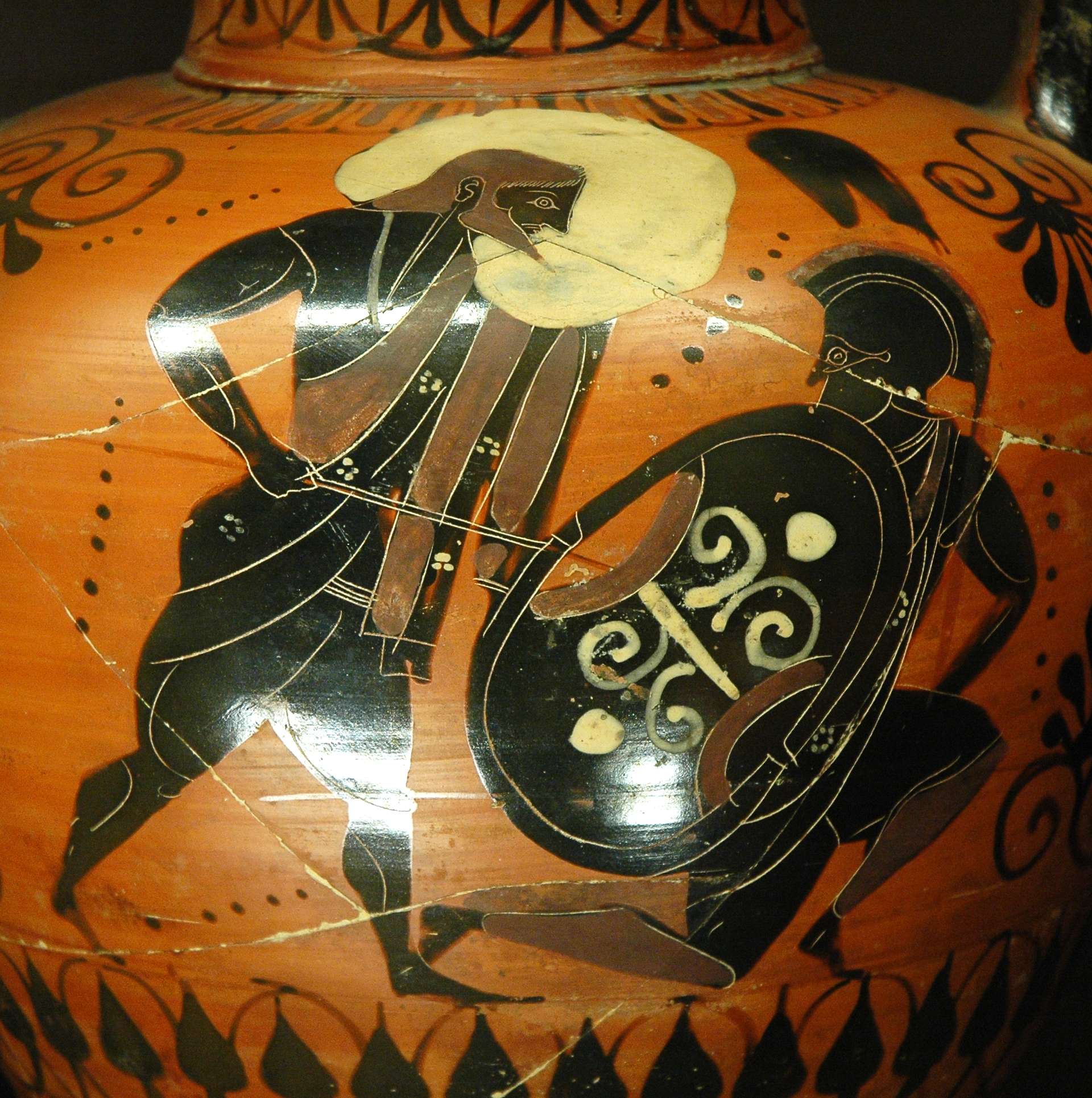
- Poseidon fighting the giant Polybotes, neck amphora painted by the Swing Painter, circa 540/530 BC, located in the Louvre (F 226)
- Born: Unknown. Named from the depiction of a swing on one vase. Before 550 BC; Athens
- Died: After 525 BC
- Known for: Vase painting
- Movement: Black-figure style

The Swing Painter was an Attic black-figure vase painter, active in the third quarter of the sixth century BC. His real name is unknown.

His phase of activity was roughly concurrent with that of Group E. An unusually large number of vases is ascribed to him, probably partially because his style is more distinctive than those of many of his contemporaries. His works are dated to the time between 540 and 520 BC. He is not considered an outstanding artist, but his work is often involuntarily amusing. Especially the oversized heads of his rather peaceable figures with their clenched fists and striking noses seem rather comical to the modern eye. His style is cursory and seems careless, according to John Boardman. He used additional colours (beyond the standard black and red) to paint patterned clothing in a striking and original fashion.

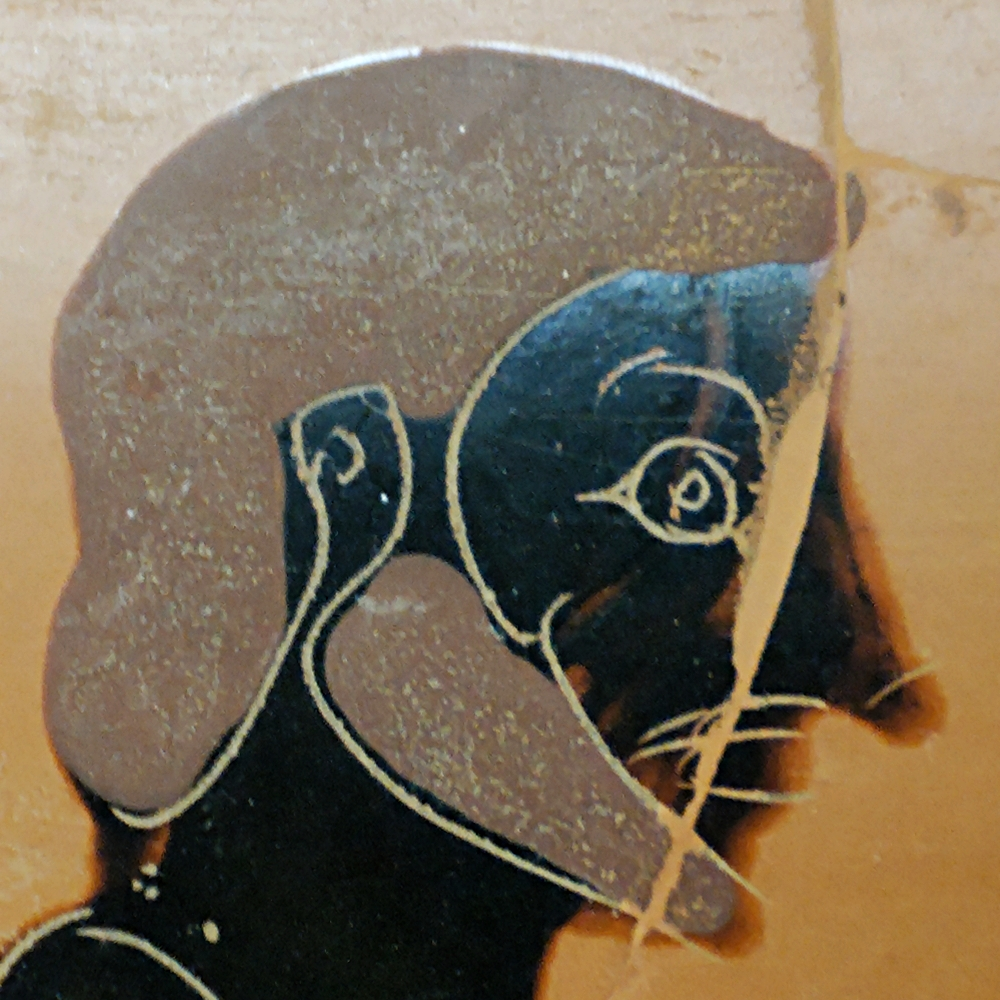
Male head – detail of a neck amphora from Vulci, circa 525/520 BC, Louvre (F 60).

The artist used a broad repertoire of mythological subjects, including some rarely depicted scenes. His depiction of Herakles and Busiris is unique in that form. He also painted scenes from everyday life, such as men on stilts and domestic motifs, including the depiction of a swing on his name vase. He also painted Panathenaic prize amphorae.

== Bibliography ==
- John Beazley: Attic Black-Figure Vase-Painters, Oxford 1956
- John Boardman: Schwarzfigurige Vasen aus Athen. Ein Handbuch, Mainz 1977, ISBN 3-8053-0233-9, p. 71
- Elke Böhr: Der Schaukelmaler, Mainz 1982 (Forschungen zur antiken Keramik Series II: Kerameus. Band 4 [de]) ISBN 3-8053-0413-7
