= Eurytion =

Set of mythological Greek characters

Eurytion (/jʊəˈrɪʃən/; Ancient Greek: Εὐρυτίων; gen.: Εὐρυτίωνος, romanized: Eurytiôn, lit. 'widely honoured') or Eurythion (/jʊəˈrɪθiən/; Ancient Greek: Εὐρυθίων) was a name attributed to several individuals in Greek mythology:

- Eurytion, the king of Phthia.
- Eurytion, a Centaur of Arcadia who demanded to marry the daughter of Dexamenus of Olenus, either Mnesimache or Deianira, or who threatened violence against his daughter Hippolyte on the day of her marriage to Azan. Her father was forced to agree, but Heracles intervened on her behalf and killed the wild horse-man.
- Eurytion, another Centaur, of Thessaly, who attempted to carry off the bride of Peirithous, king of the Lapiths, on their wedding day. He and his fellows were killed in the fight with the Lapiths that followed, the Centauromachy. Ovid refers to him as "Eurytus", and by his Latinized Greek name "Eurytion".
- Eurytion, and the two-headed dog Orthrus, were the guardians of the cattle of Geryon and were killed by Heracles.
- Eurytion, a Trojan archer during the Trojan War, son of Lycaon and brother of Pandarus. He participated in the funeral games of Anchises.
- Eurytion, a defender of Thebes against the Seven, was killed by Parthenopaeus.
- Eurytion, an alternate name for a Gigas who was slain by Artemis.
