= Group E (vase painting) =

Attic vase painters of the black-figure style

Group E (or E Group) was a group of Attic vase painters of the black-figure style. They were active between 560 and 540 BC.

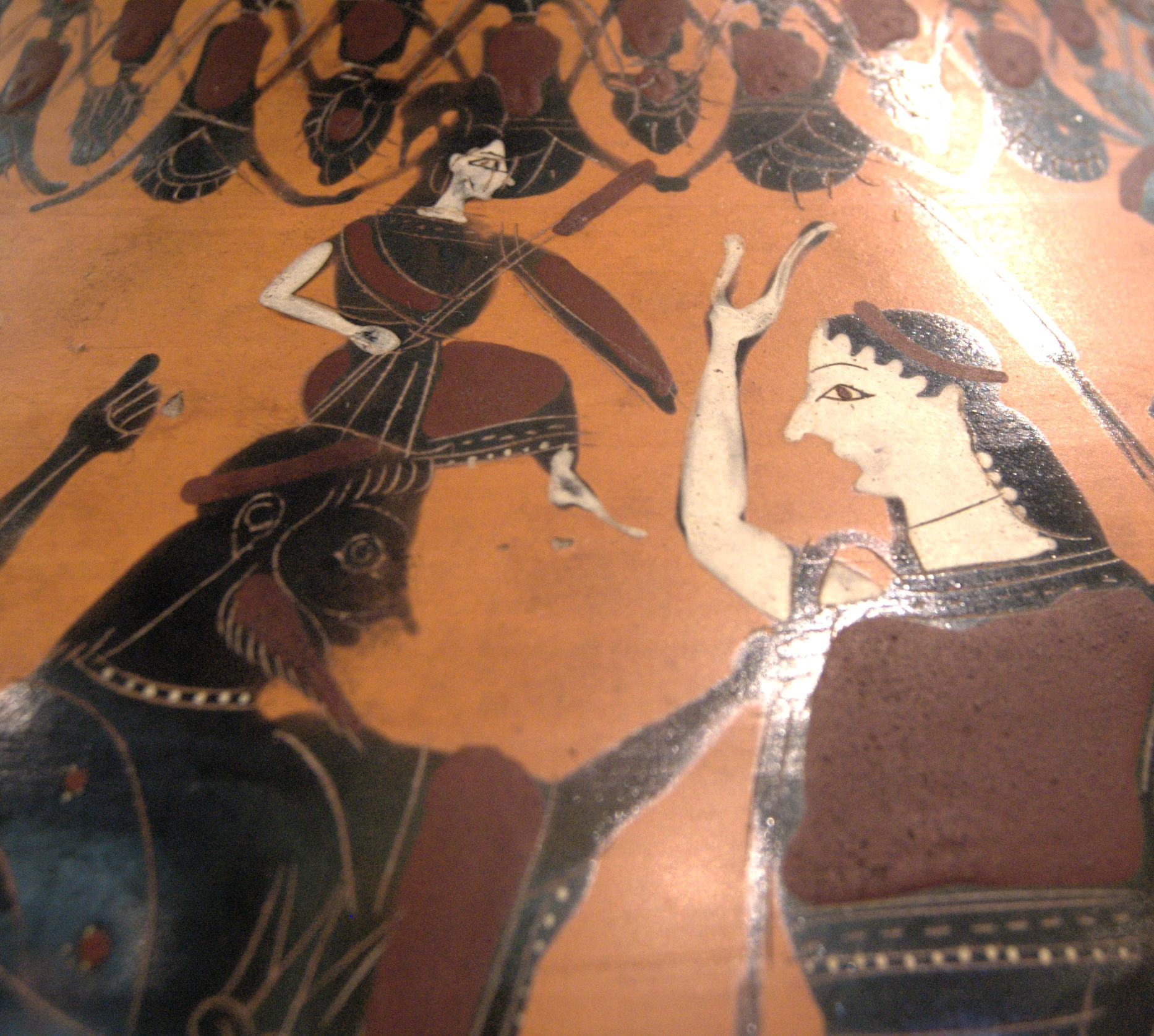
Athena is born from the head of Zeus, amphora, third quarter of the sixth century BC, The Louvre F 32.

Group E – the E stands for Exekias is stylistically quite homogeneous. It is the fertile ground from which the art of Exekias grew. Chronologically, the group is somewhat earlier than most of Exekias' work. Although most Group E vases were painted by the same painter, several artists belonged to it. Group E is considered the most significant anonymous group of Attic vase painters, because it created high-quality works on the one hand, and on the other abandoned the artistic tradition established by Lydos and associated painters, exploring new avenues of expression.

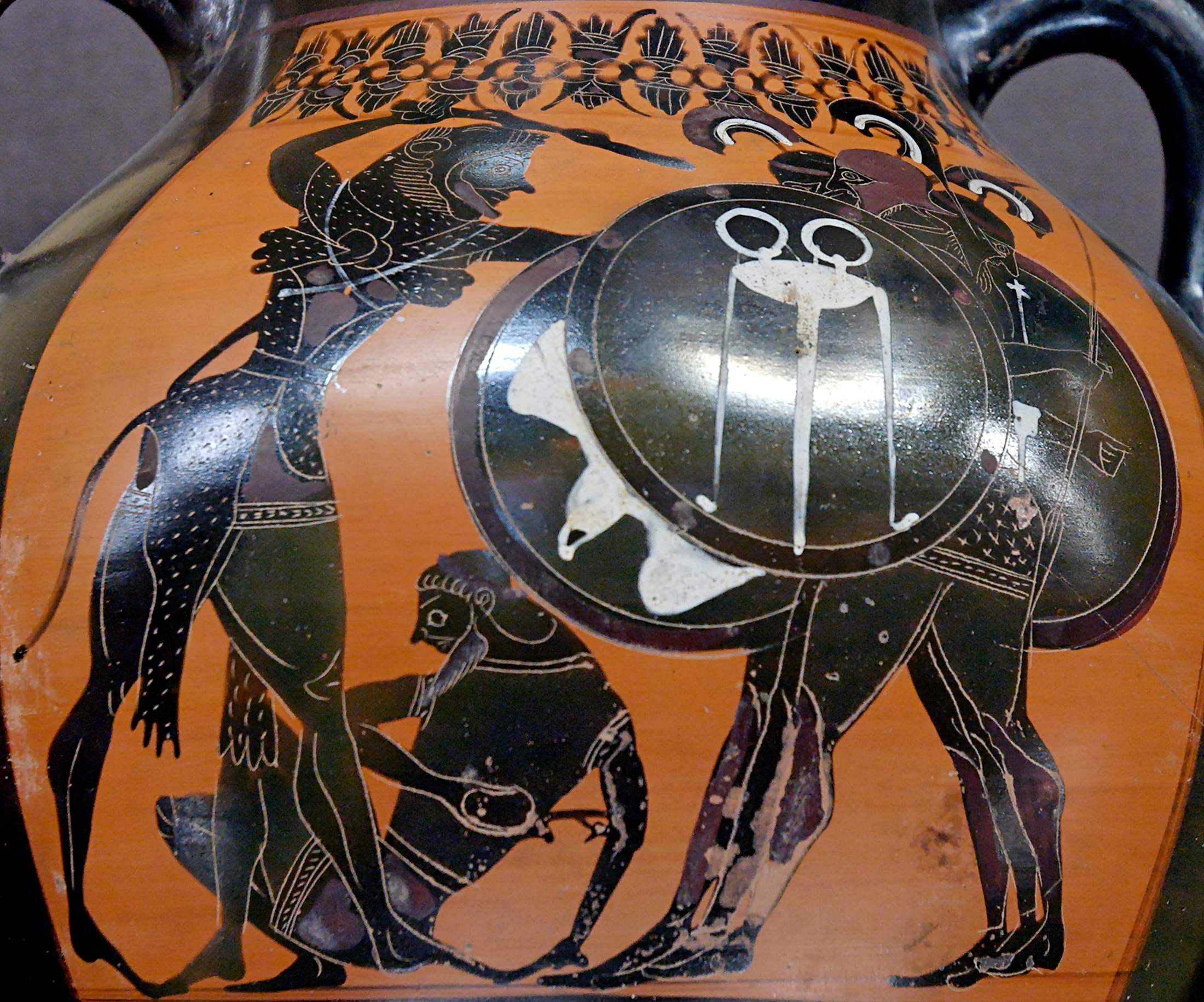
Herakles fighting Geryon, amphora, circa 540 BC, Louvre F 55.

The main vase shape painted by the group E artists was the belly amphora of type A. Older shapes were abandoned totally (e.g. ovoid neck amphorae) or mostly (e.g. column kraters). The group painted nearly no small vessel types. It introduced a neck amphora with ornamented handles. Before he became visibly active as a painter in his own right, Exekias potted two of the surviving vessels painted by the group. They are the only E group vessels to bear a potter's signature. The drawings by the group lack the monumentality of earlier work by Lydos or later vases by Exekias. The animal frieze had been abandoned completely. In terms of content, the same themes occurred repeatedly: Herakles with the Nemean Lion or with Geryon, Theseus with the Minotaur. The E group style became increasingly dominant during the second half of the 6th century BC.

Another important innovations were the Kalos inscriptions, first introduced by the E Group. The first Ephebe thus honoured was a certain Stesias.

== Bibliography ==
- John Beazley: Attic Black-Figure Vase-Painters, Oxford 1956, p. 133-143.
- John Boardman: Schwarzfigurige Vasen aus Athen. Ein Handbuch, Mainz 1977, ISBN 3-8053-0233-9, p. 62
- Heide Mommsen: E-Gruppe, in Der Neue Pauly Vol. 3, Stuttgart 1997, Col. 859f.
