= Antimenes Painter =

Ancient Greek vase painter

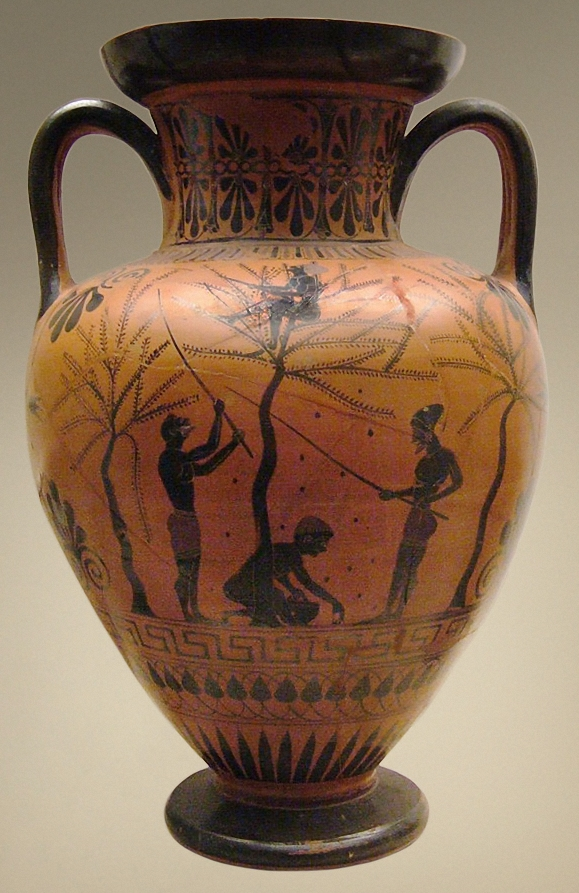
Olive gathering, amphora, ‚circa 520 BC. British Museum.

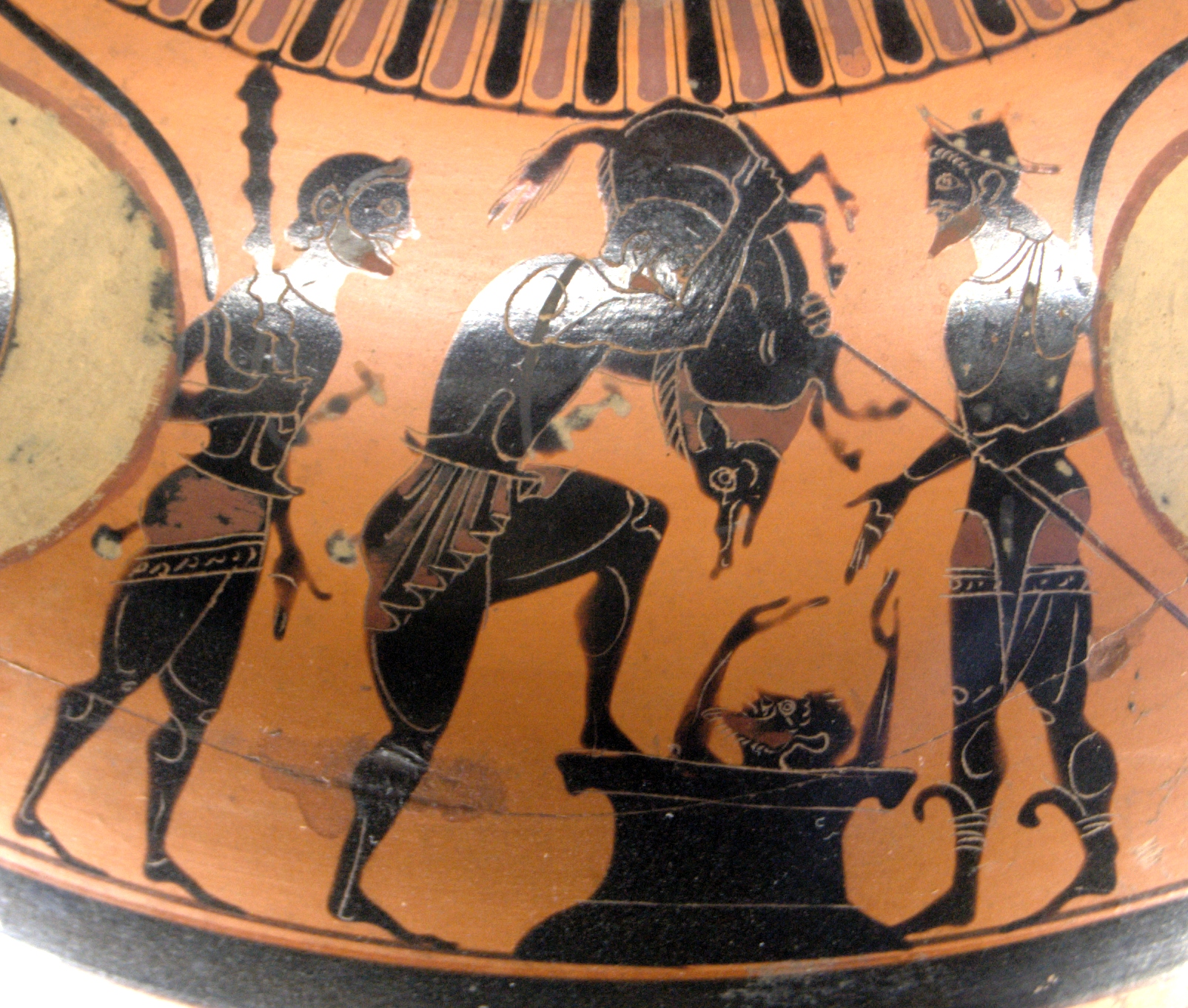
Herakles, Eurystheus and the Erymanthian Boar. Side A from an Ancient Greek black-figured amphora painted by Antimenes, ca. 525 BC, from Etruria. Louvre, Paris.

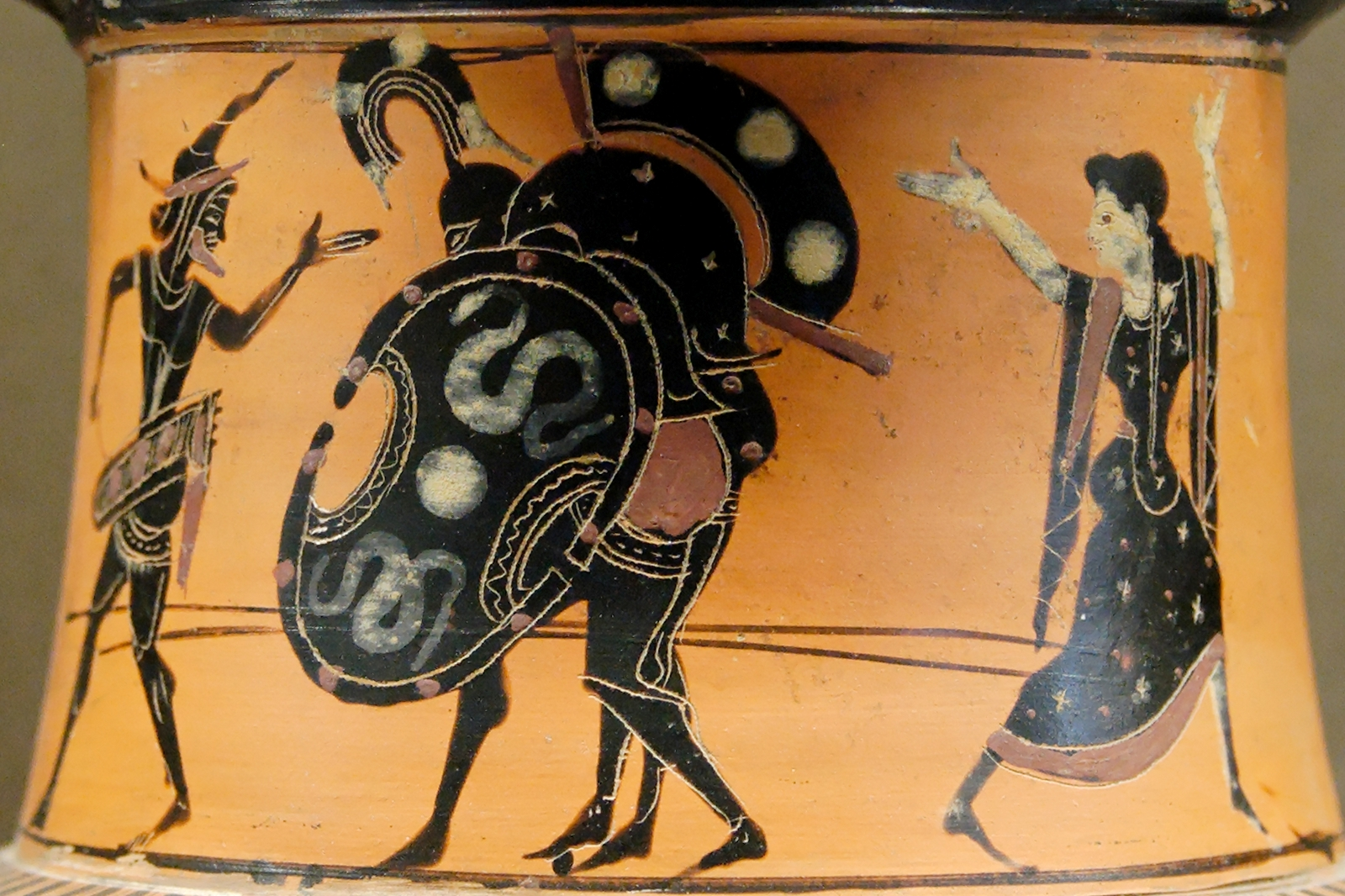
Ajax, protected by Hermes and Athena carries the body of Achilles back to the Greek camp, 520–510 BC, Louvre.

The Antimenes Painter was an Attic vase painter of the black-figure style, active between circa 530 and 510 BC.

The real name of the Antimenes Painter is not known; his current name is an archaeological convention, derived from the Kalos inscription on a hydria in the archaeological museum of Leyden. Of the 150 works ascribed to him, the majority are hydriai and standard amphorae. Most works attributed to him were found in Etruria. He is considered to have been connected with the workshop of Andokides.

He depicted the current repertoire of his period: the adventures of Herakles, Dionysos and his companions, and chariot scenes. He varies the themes, his compositions are described as organised. His distinctive motifs are rather idyllic, often including smaller figurines subsidiary to the main narrative. Examples are a well scene on the aforementioned Leyden hydria and a depiction of the olive harvest on an amphora in the British Museum at London.

His drawing style resembles that of Psiax; influences by the early red-figure style are also apparent. Nonetheless, he continued to use the black-figure technique, which maintained many followers. It is hard to distinguish him and associated painters from the Antimenes Painter. Some examples of his later works are striking in the fine and expressive quality of the drawing.

== See also ==
- List of Greek vase painters

== Bibliography ==
- John Boardman: Schwarzfigurige Vasen aus Athen. Ein Handbuch, Mainz 1977, ISBN 3-8053-0233-9, p. 119f.
- Johannes Burow: Der Antimenesmaler, von Zabern, Mainz 1990 (Forschungen zur antiken Keramik Reihe II: Kerameus. Band 7) ISBN 3-8053-1029-3
- The Getty Museum – Biography of the Antimenes Painter
- Johannes Burow. Der Antimenesmaler. Mainz: Philipp von Zabern, 1989 (Forschungen zur antiken Keramik. Reihe 2, Kerameus. Bd. 7). ISBN 3-8053-1029-3
