= Kalos inscription =

Form of epigraph found on Attic vases and graffiti in antiquity

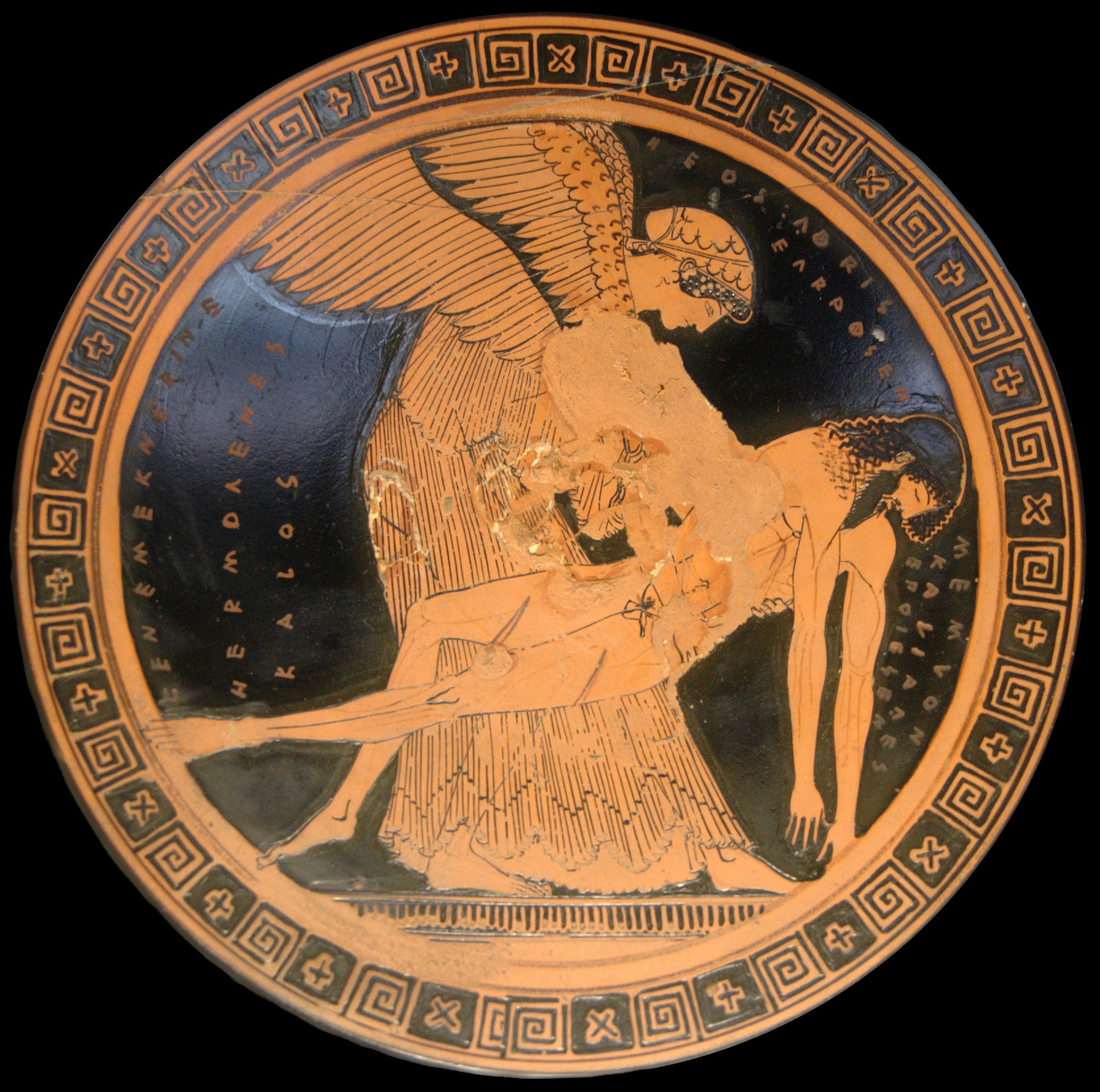
The so-called "Memnon pietà", with the goddess Eos holding the body of Memnon: among the inscriptions is the phrase Hermogenes kalos (Attic red-figure cup, c. 490–480 BC, from Capua; at the Louvre).

A kalos inscription is a form of epigraph found on Attic vases and graffiti in antiquity, mainly during the Classical period from 550 to 450 BC. The word kalós (καλός), meaning 'handsome' or 'beautiful', was often accompanied by the name of a certain man, or sometimes simply by the word paîs (παῖς), meaning the 'boy' or 'youth', without naming a particular person. The female version was kalḗ (καλή). The kalós inscriptions typically had an erotic connotation.

== Overview ==
The kalos inscription is typically found on vessels used for a symposium. The scenes that accompany the inscription vary, and include athletic exercises and myths.

Some inscriptions are generic, reading only "the boy is beautiful" (Ancient Greek: ὁ παῖς καλός, ho paîs kalós). The inscription more often took the form of the beloved's name, in the nominative singular, followed by "kalós" (X kalós, i.e. "X is beautiful"). The beloved is most often a male youth, but a few times girls or women were spoken of as kalḗ (καλή). In one early cataloging of the inscriptions, among the individuals labeled as beautiful were 30 women and girls, and 528 youths. Male names outnumber female by more than twenty to one. At least some of the women labeled kalḗ were hetaîrai, courtesans or prostitutes.

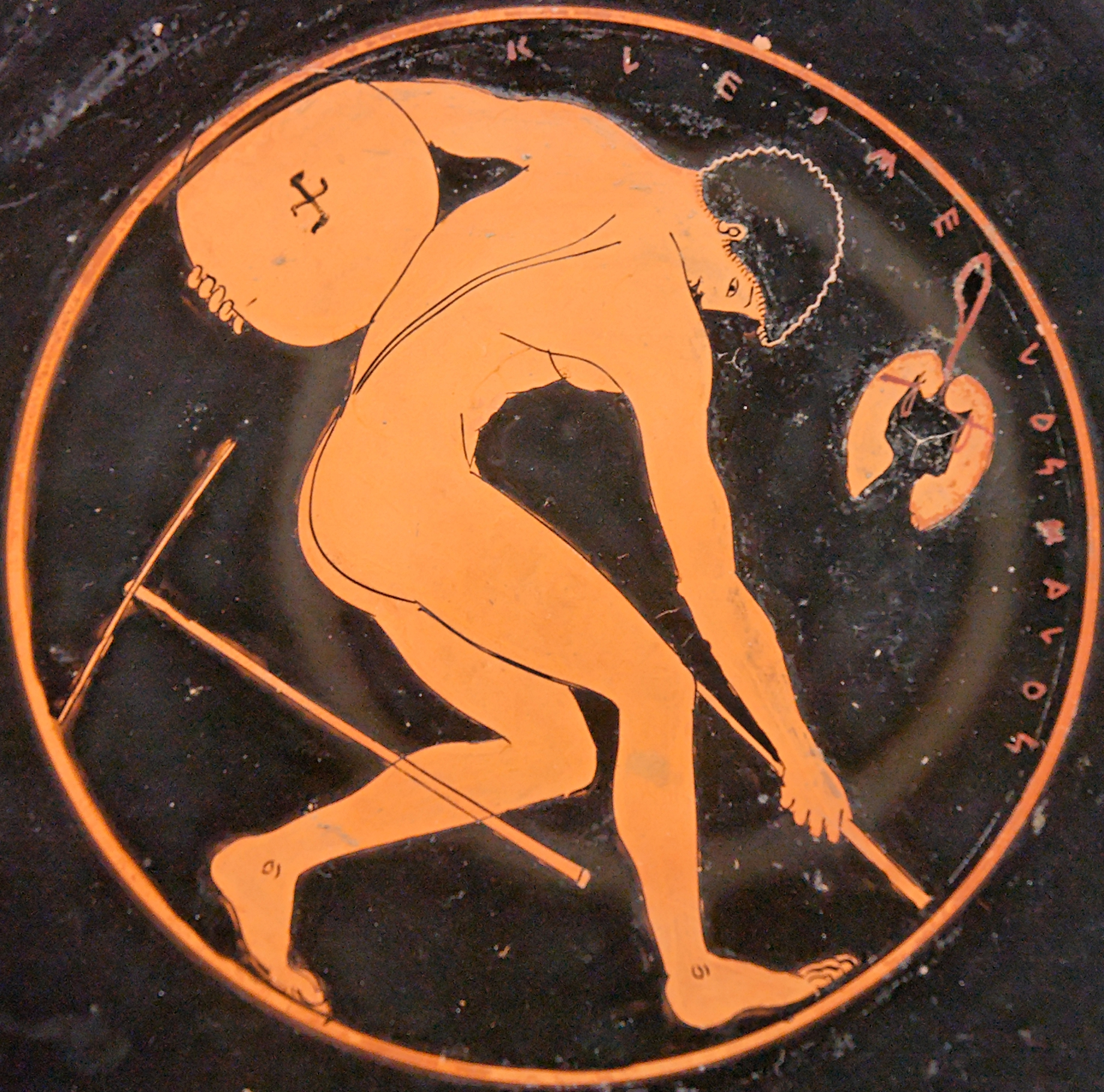
Attic red-figure kylix with the inscription "Kleomelos Kalos": the youth Kleomelos ("he of glorious limbs") practises discus throwing in a gymnasium.

The names designated as kalos are characteristic of aristocratic Athenian citizens. Some kalos inscriptions are associated with certain vase painters or pottery workshops. The Antimenes Painter, for instance, is named for the kalos inscription to Antimenes on his pots, and the Leagros Group pottery workshop is named for the youth Leagros, a widely popular object of kalos praise. These associations suggest a cult of celebrity or a concerted effort by a given youth's family to increase their son's public standing.

The purpose of these inscriptions remains uncertain, and many examples may be declarations of love as part of same-sex courtship in Athens. In some cases, the inscriptions or vessels may have been made to order.

Kalos names are also found as graffiti on walls, the most abundant example being the find on Thassos of 60 kalos inscriptions carved on rock dating from the 4th century. The non-epigraphic literary evidence consists of two references in Aristophanes. Both of these instances, however, praise the demos (the citizenry as a whole) rather than any individual, and suggest the public performance role of the kalos tag.

== Examples ==
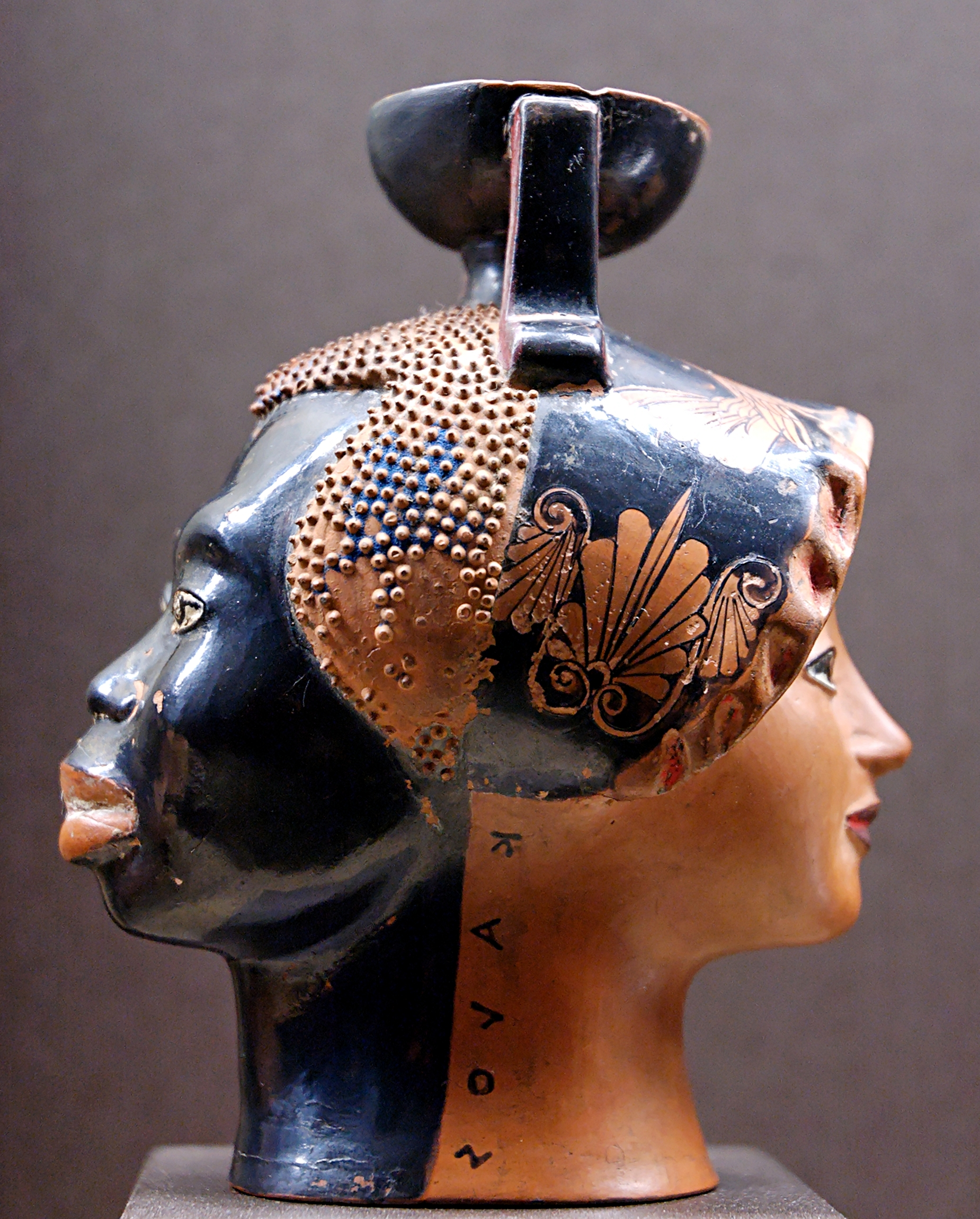
Janiform aryballos with kalos inscription c. 520-510 BC

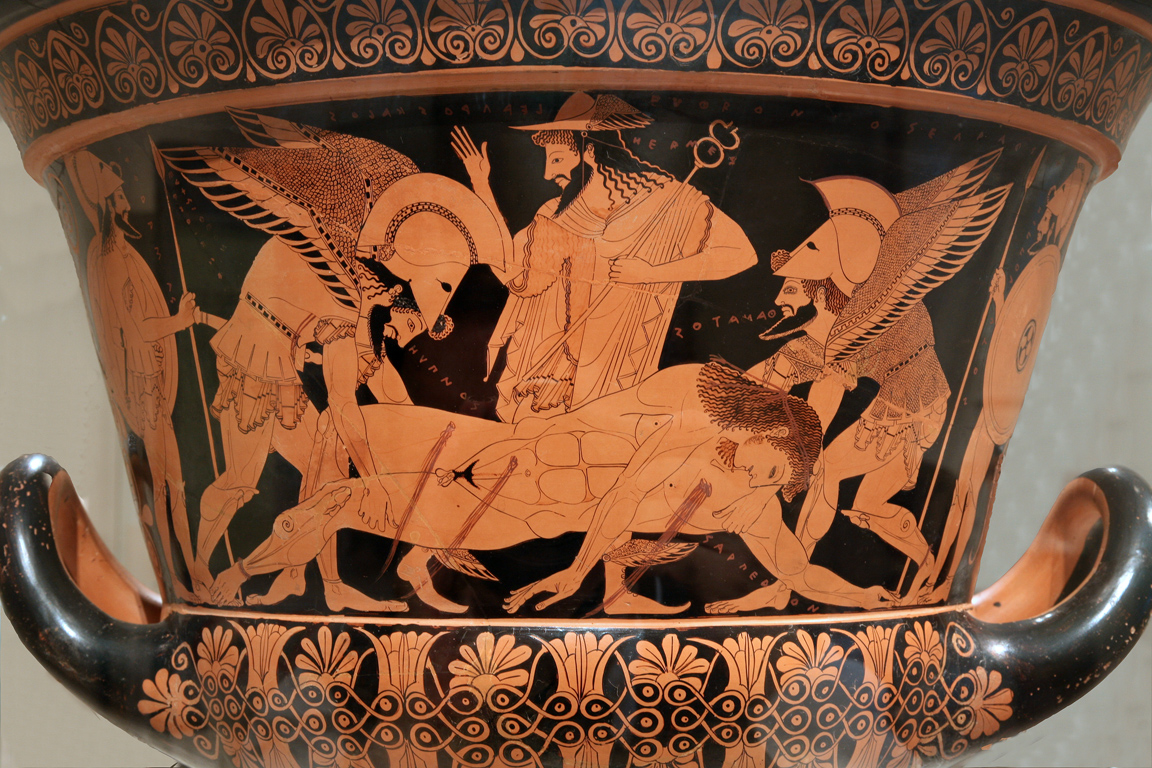
The death of Sarpedon with a Leagros kalos (lit. 'Leargos is beautiful') inscription, c. 520-510 BC

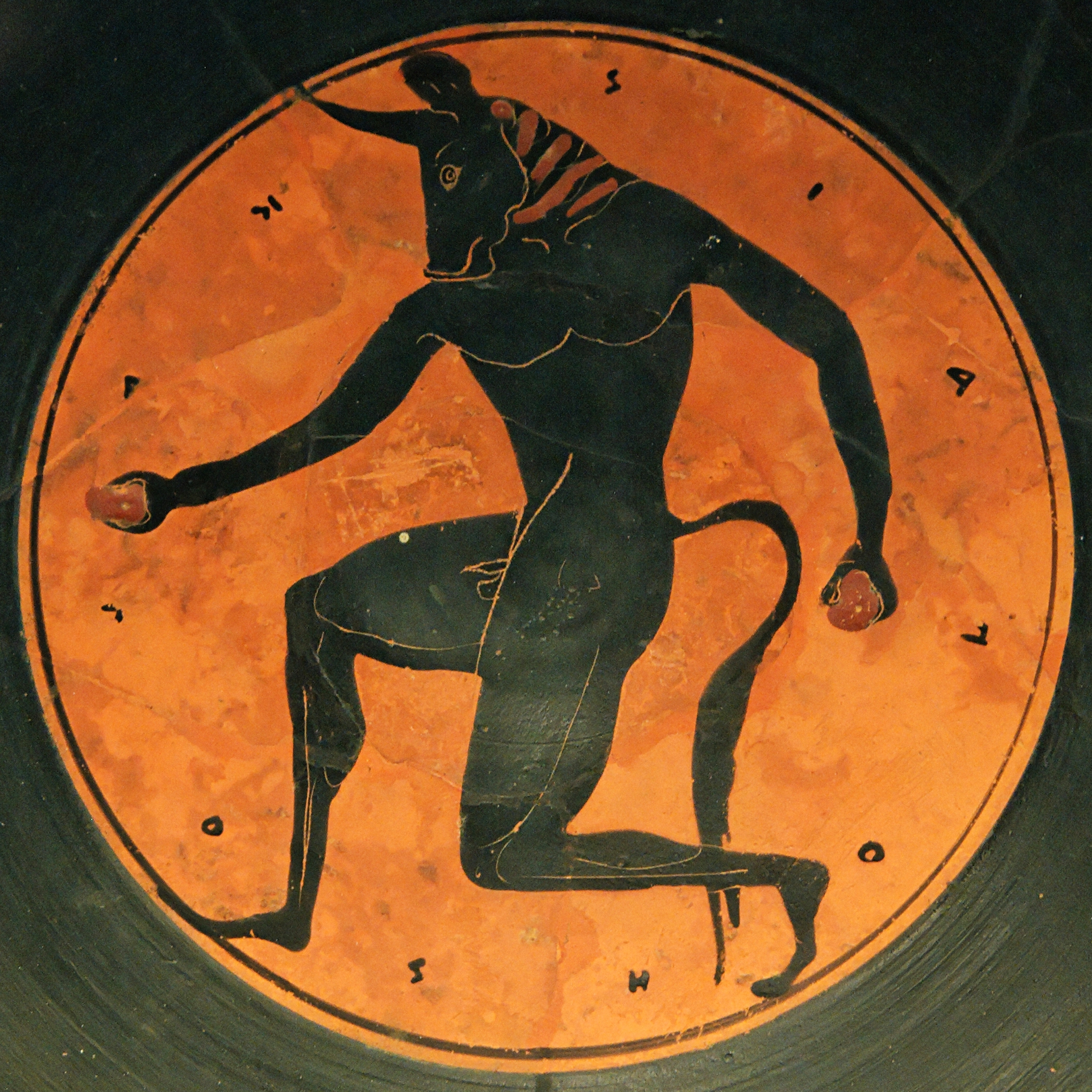
Kylix tondo depicting the Minotaur with generic "the boy is beautiful" inscription, c. 515 BC

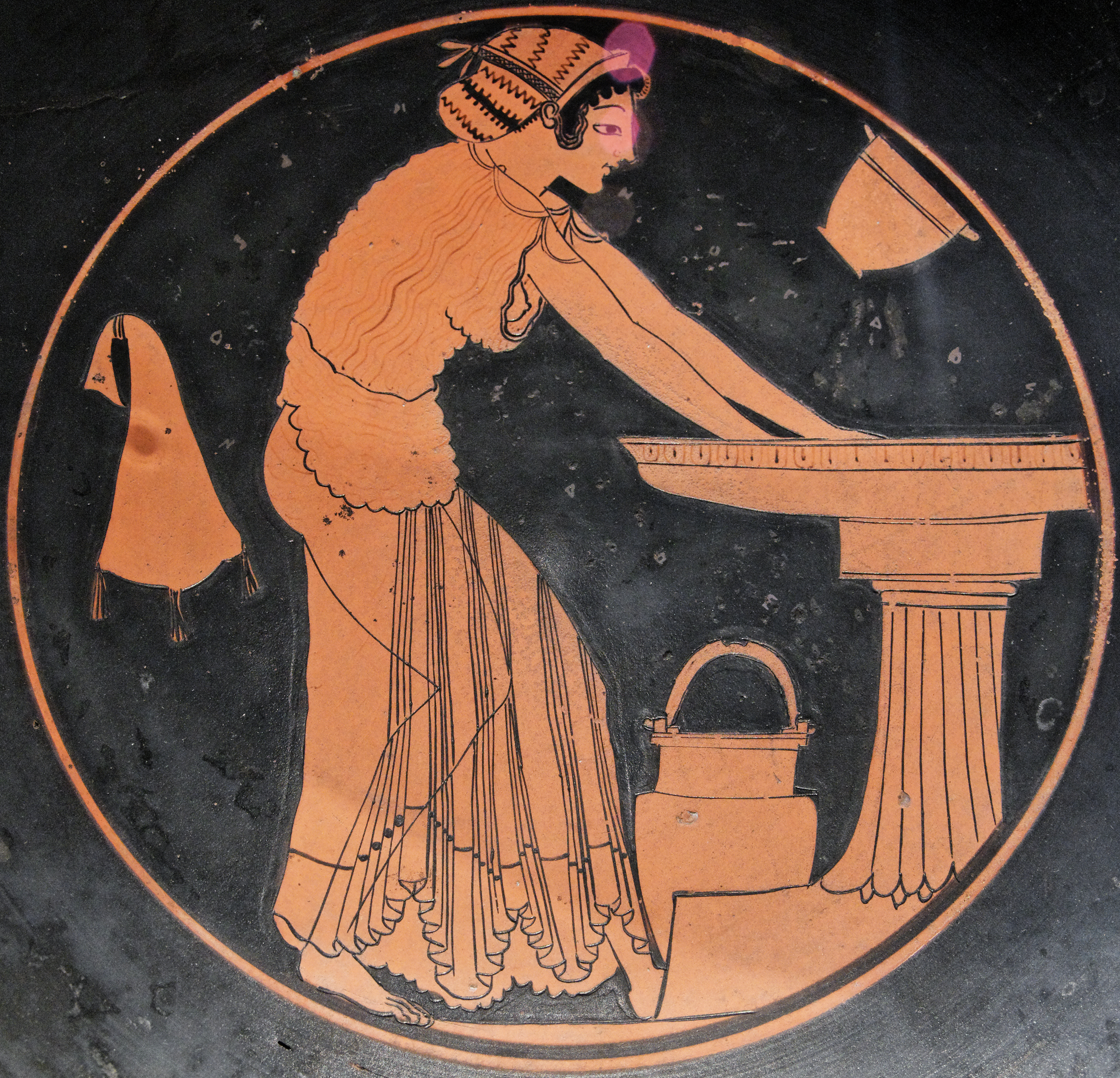
Kalḗ woman bathing at the laver, with a water bucket, a skyphos, and a wineskin, c. 500 BC

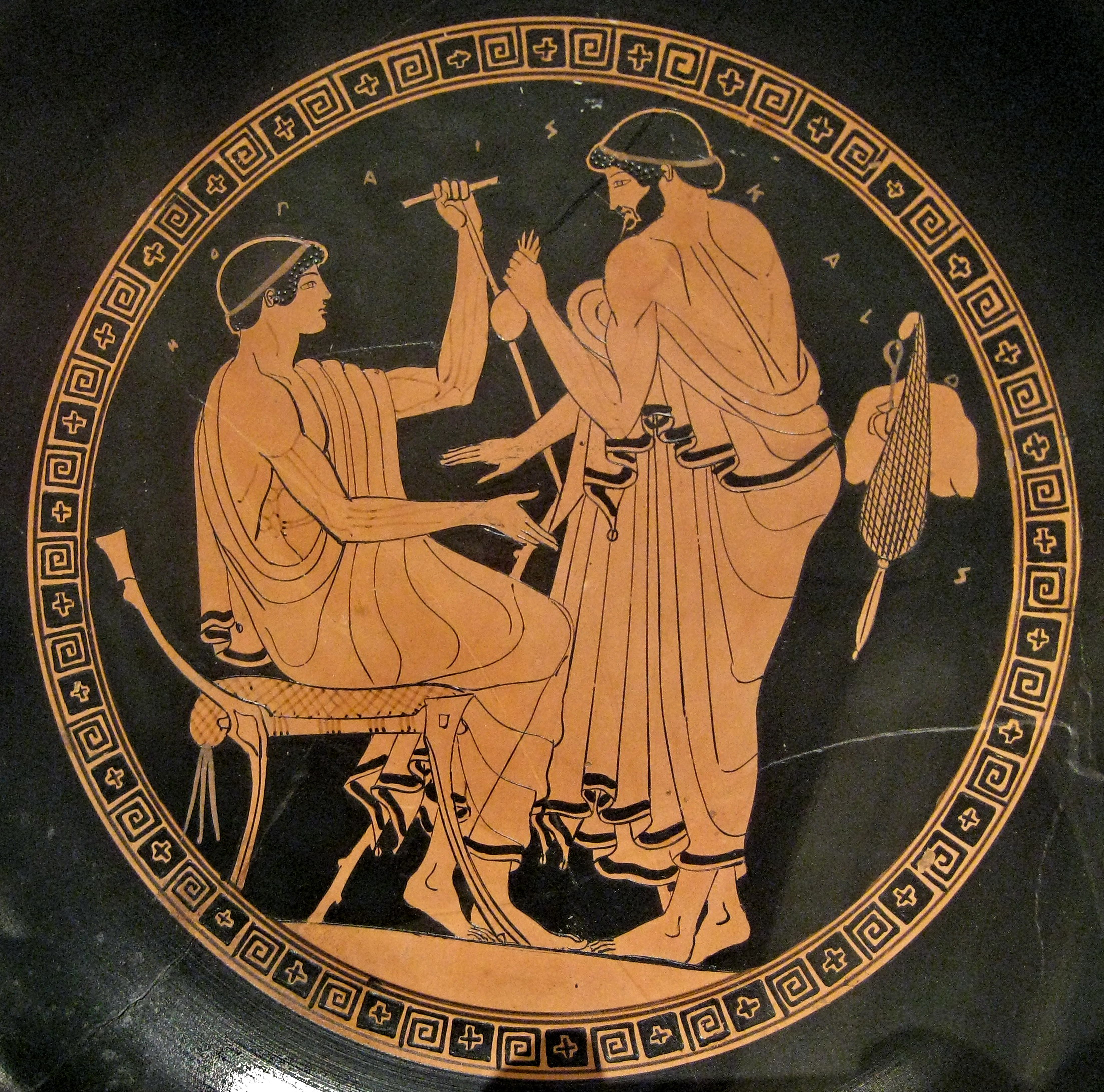
A sexual solicitation scene with generic kalos inscription, 5th century BC

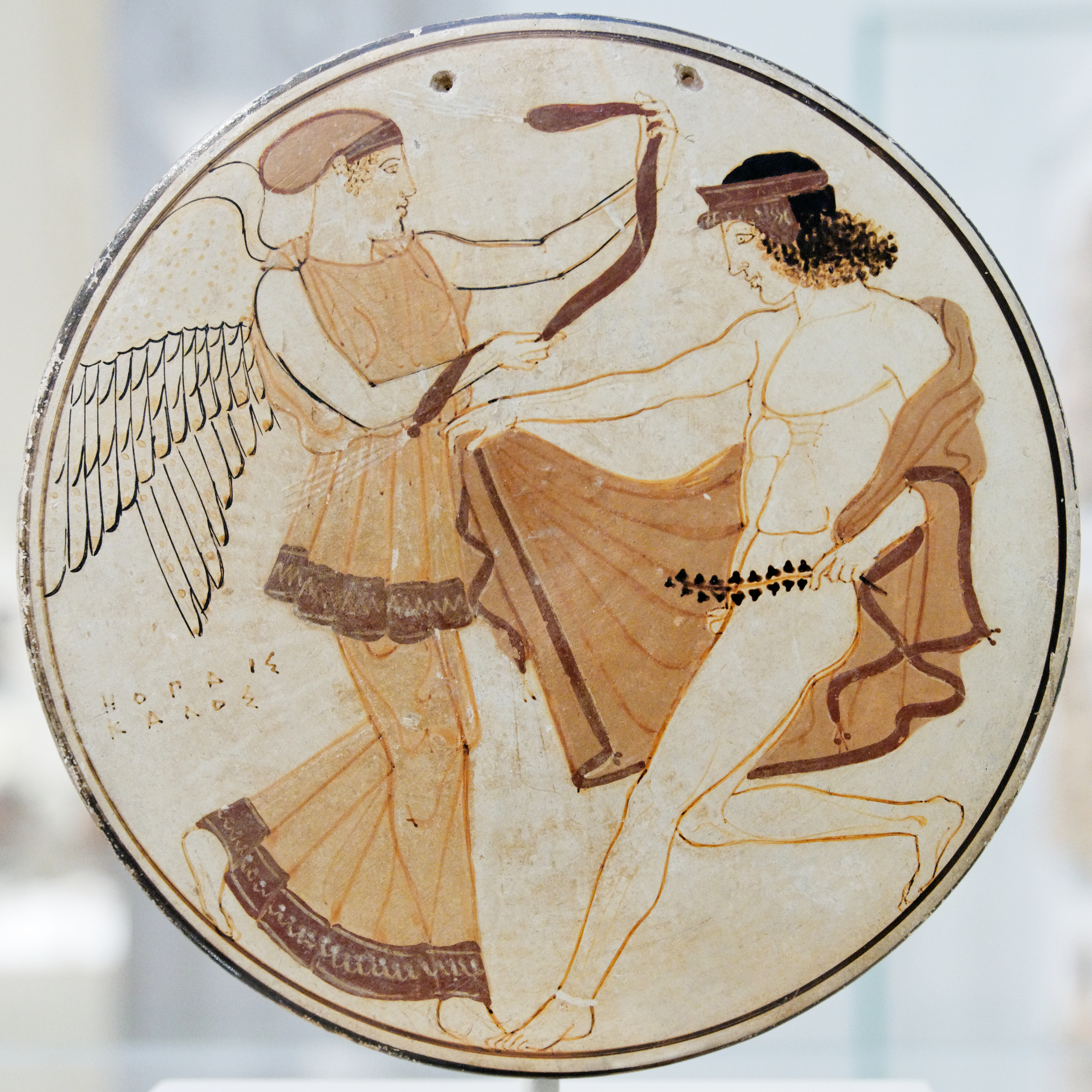
Nike offering a wreath to an athletic victor, c. 460-450 BC

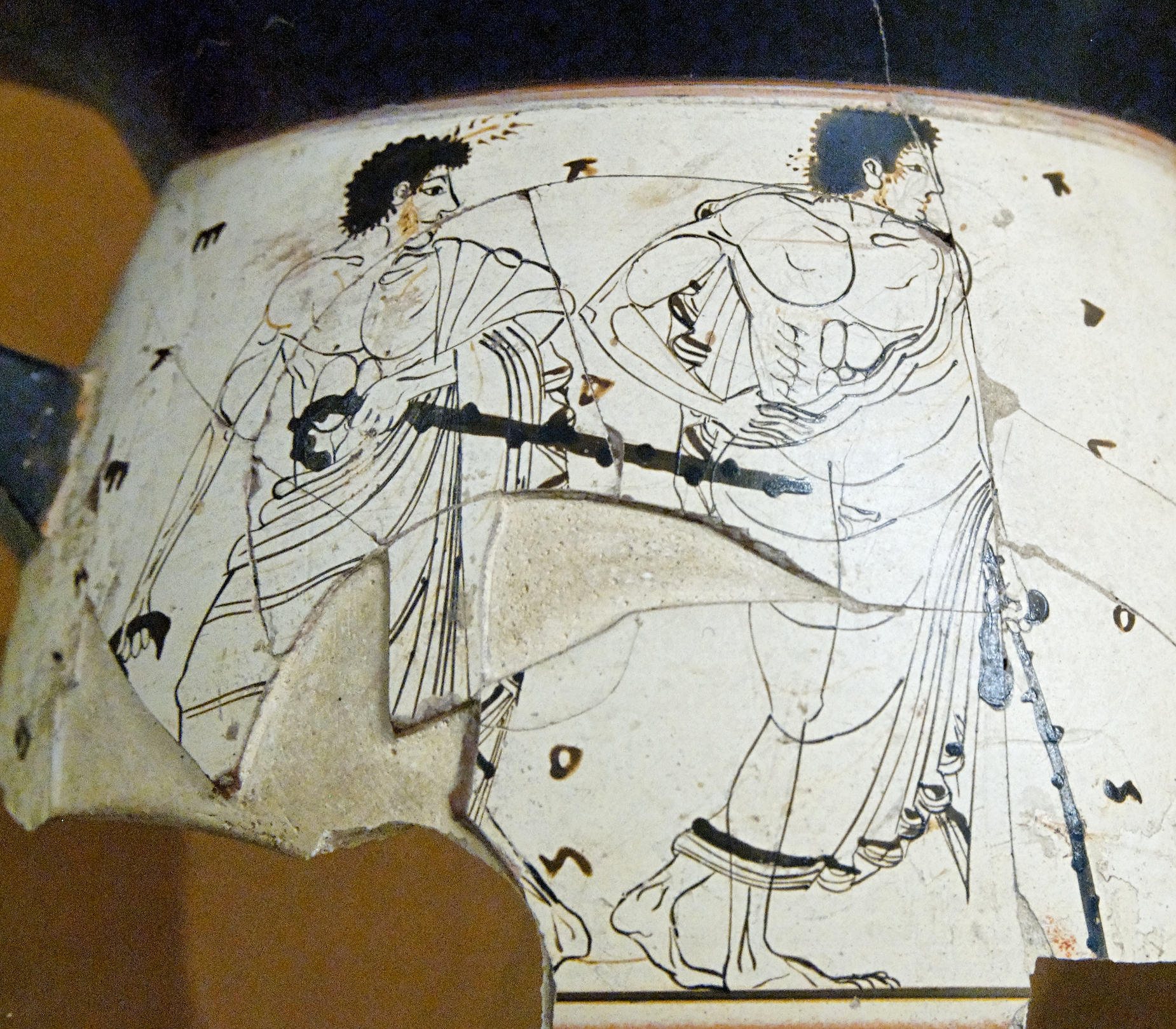
Fragment of an Attic white-ground cup with kalos inscriptions

== Sources ==
- Clark, Andrew J.; Elston, Maya; Hart, Mary Louise (2002). Understanding Greek Vases: A Guide to Terms, Styles, and Techniques. Getty Publications. ISBN 978-0-89236-599-9.
- Neil W. Slater. "The Vase as Ventriloquist: Kalos-inscriptions and the Culture of Fame", in Signs of Orality: The Oral Tradition and its Influence in the Greek and Roman World (ed. E. Anne Mackay). Leiden: Brill, 1999, pp. 143–161.
- Kenneth J. Dover. Greek Homosexuality. 2nd edition. London: Duckworth, 1989.
- François Lissarrague. Publicity and performance. Kalos inscriptions in Attic vase-painting, In: Performance Culture and Athenian Democracy, Cambridge 1999, pp. 359–373.
- H. Alan Shapiro. Leagros the Satyr in Greek Vases: Images, Contexts and Controversies., ed. Clemente Marconi, 2004, pp. 1–12.
